= 1806 in Canada =

- Decades: 1780s; 1790s; 1800s; 1810s; 1820s
- See also: History of Canada; Timeline of Canadian history; List of years in Canada

Events from the year 1806 in Canada.

== Incumbents ==
- Monarch: George III

=== Federal government ===
- Parliament of Lower Canada: 4th
- Parliament of Upper Canada: 4th

=== Governors ===
- Governor of the Canadas: Robert Milnes
- Governor of New Brunswick: Thomas Carleton
- Governor of Nova Scotia: John Wentworth
- Commodore-Governor of Newfoundland: Erasmus Gower then John Holloway
- Governor of Prince Edward Island: Joseph Frederick Wallet DesBarres

== Events ==
- Minor trouble arises after 1806 when a governor attempts to anglicize Lower Canada, but he is able to quell dissent if not to achieve his goal.
- Russian-American Company Company collects otter pelts from Alaska to Spanish California.
- Mungo Park killed by natives on Niger River in Africa.
- On return trip John Colter is released from the Lewis and Clark Expedition to join Forrest Hancock and Joseph Dickson (Dixon) to trap the Yellowstone River.
- Le Canadien, a Quebec nationalist newspaper, is founded.

== Births ==
- April 12 – Peter Rindisbacher, painter (d.1834)
- May 6 – Charles Dewey Day, lawyer, judge and politician (d.1884)
- August 12 – George Ryan, politician (d.1876)
- November 2 – Henry Kellett, officer in the Royal Navy, oceanographer, Arctic explorer (d.1875)
- December 9 – Jean-Olivier Chénier, physician and Patriote (d.1837)

== Deaths ==
- May 31: Louis Dunière, politician (b. 1723)
- July: Robert Gray, merchant sea-captain and explorer (b.1755)
- October 26: John Graves Simcoe, first lieutenant governor of Upper Canada (b.1752)
- December 31: Deborah Cottnam, schoolmistress and poet (b. c.1725–1728)

== Historical documents ==
For "inhabitants on both sides," U.S. trade with British North America should be free, but U.S. will dominate carrying trade

U.S. Senate wants return of trade goods that British confiscated as well as "arrangement" over impressment of U.S. sailors

Earl of Selkirk argues settlement of Highland emigrants in British North America (not in U.S.A.) is good for colonists and colonies

Salem newspaper names Canada-U.S.A. road links as communications that will "accelerate the settlements in these countries"

"W. Wilberforce" and "G. Sharp" sponsor plan for "a comprehensive system of Improvement" for Indigenous in British North America

Michigan rumours of attack by Indigenous people probably meant to scare off trade rivals, and use big trade gathering as pretext

Reading Declaration of Independence on July 4th "breathes envy, hatred, strife, malice and all uncharitableness" between nations at peace

=== Lower Canada ===
"This great cause of humanity" - British physician John Ring details extent of cowpox vaccination against smallpox in Lower Canada

In Quebec City, business has "been laid aside[...]to give room for demonstrations of joy for the Victory [at Trafalgar]"

Part of Quebec convoy to Britain burned by French; 2 troop transports escape, but 6 merchantmen "left pursued by the enemy"

Tips on growing corn, "an article of great importance to the cultivators of this Province" because so much of it has to be imported

Why House of Assembly replaced straight land tax with proportional tax based on varying agricultural value of land

Assembly has Montreal merchant dinner toastmaster and Montreal Gazette editor who published toasts arrested for libelling House

House of Assembly orders Quebec Mercury editor's arrest by sergeant-at-arms for publishing account of House proceedings

British ambassador to U.S.A. relates frustrating case of North West Company goods seized by Michilimackinac customs office

John Quincy Adams at gathering with Canadians "Mr. Shaw" and "Mr. M'Gillivray" (possibly Angus Shaw and William McGillivray)

Bridges and roads planned: Quebec City to Connecticut River; Trois-Rivières to Hereford; and through Hatley to Richelieu River

£1,000 for removing "impediments" in Lachine Rapids is to be matched for further work there and toward Lake St. Francis

"A Man left a Widower with a Family of Eight Small Children, for all of whom he [cannot] provide, [will place] out some of them[....]"

Woman with minor son, "sole surviving issue of her mariage," wants "all persons indebted to his Sucession [sic] to pay immediately"

Counterfeiters of U.S. bank notes in Montreal arrested and their paper supplier offered immunity if he turns King's evidence

Protestant missionary calls Catholics "very kind to strangers [but] involved in the thick darkness of superstition and ignorance"

Newspaper Le Canadien launched with motto "Notre foi, notre langue, nos institutions (our faith, our language, our institutions)"

Dr. Blanchet to begin series of lectures on chemistry (gasses etc.) and geography ("Mountains, Mines, Petrifications, Lakes" etc.)

Note on destroyed Trois-Rivières Ursuline convent praises nuns running hospitals and educating "the female part of the society"

"Just arrived[...]Madeira wine, Spanish wine[...], Cogniac Brandy, Holland's Geneva,[...]Martinique crème Cordials [etc.]"

Deputy Commissary General wants proposals to supply "[3,000] gallons of proof West India rum"

Ad notes "life of drudgery and anxiety led by the sons and daughters of Thespis" suffering "fickle fortune's severest frowns"

Touring artist informs ladies and gentlemen of his portrait painting (miniature to "as large as life"), paper profiles, art lessons etc.

Painting: view of Quebec City in distance from downriver near north bank

=== Upper Canada ===
John Norton blames presents and encouragement from Indian Affairs for opposition in Six Nations to promoting "general good"

Joseph Brant urges Assembly to make Six Nations reserve "our own property" and to not let government "curtail us of a great part"

Norton sees "increasing propensity" to raise cattle, which "from the great decrease of wild animals[...]becomes very necessary"

Lawyer shows new lieutenant governor Francis Gore zeal for constitution that "neither innovation can impair nor anarchy deform"

Brant asks to be allowed to give customary welcome with "leading chiefs and principal warriors" of Six Nations to Lt. Gov. Gore

For £1,000, Mississaugas sell 85,000 acres just west of Toronto to Crown (excepting land and fishing rights on 4 watercourses)

Efforts to have escaped slaves returned from Michigan Territory are refused by its governor and judiciary as beyond their power

Moravian missionaries blame "rum-traders [for] several unpleasant things [that] created much disturbance" at Fairfield mission

Methodist preacher Nathan Bangs dreads "a Lukewarm spirit[,] only a dead weight to those who would be alive to God"

Province is to pay £400 for equipment to teach "the principles of Natural Philosophy, Geography, Astronomy and the Mathematics"

Report of duel between lawyers after one is persuaded to challenge other for making critical remarks about him (challenger dies)

Fashion and behaviour in Upper Canadian society are criticized by man writing from York

=== Nova Scotia ===
Subsidies set for grain grown on newly cleared land, for importing salt (for fisheries) and for exporting fish to British West Indies

As French fleet attacks Newfoundland, Halifax hosts military force ("probably near 3,000" says writer who got commission then)

Wilmot Anglican minister has "a numerous congregation," but few communicants and two-thirds are "discenters"

"[Everyone] is at liberty to pay [for] the support of religion [and] I fear learning and religion + morality will be rare plants in N Scotia"

=== New Brunswick ===
Ward Chipman tells Edward Winslow he "or any other particular friend" can contribute anonymous opinion pieces for newspaper

"Free Negro" of Norton Parish requests 200-acre tract near Kennebecasis River for himself, wife and child (granted)

=== Hudson's Bay Company ===
Moose Factory chief John Thomas says "Canadians" have left Eastmain and will do same at Moose if HBC will drop some posts

Moose asks Fort Albany's help with 130 day food supply; wants to send some men to Albany because few rabbits and fish caught

Daily thaw bad at Churchill because firewood and "Partridge ground" are on river islands, and snow doubles weight of snowshoes

Moose Factory cows go through ice when orders ignored; after 3 hours in water, 1 cow dies and another is warmed up back at post

=== Western interior ===
Alexander Mackenzie tells Roderick Mackenzie he must write Northwest history, but will possibly make more enemies than friends

Ojibwe from Lake Vermilion recalls when settlers were no problem, but times have changed and begs lake waters not be poisoned

Traders and Indigenous people going from Pine River to Cross Lake nearly starve "owing to the Countrie being all burnt"

Summary of travels of Lewis and Clark Expedition

Meriwether Lewis warns of "formidable" North West Company expanding from posts on Souris River into Missouri River region

"Saakies" and Potawatomi seek help from Upper Canada against encroachment on their lands from U.S.A. (request deferred)

=== Elsewhere ===
Seal nets catch "above 130" seals, keeping more Labrador Inuit around Okak "than have been present for these many years"
