= 1808 in Canada =

- Decades: 1780s; 1790s; 1800s; 1810s; 1820s
- See also: History of Canada; Timeline of Canadian history; List of years in Canada

Events from the year 1808 in Canada.

== Incumbents ==
- Monarch: George III

=== Federal government ===
- Parliament of Lower Canada: 4th (until April 27)
- Parliament of Upper Canada: 4th (until March 16)

=== Governors ===
- Governor of the Canadas: Robert Milnes
- Governor of New Brunswick: Thomas Carleton
- Governor of Nova Scotia: John Wentworth
- Commodore-Governor of Newfoundland: John Holloway
- Governor of Prince Edward Island: Joseph Frederick Wallet DesBarres

== Events ==
- David Thompson explores Kootenay River.
- Simon Fraser follows Fraser River to the Pacific.
- The American Fur Company is chartered by John Jacob Astor to compete with Canadian fur trade
- The Upper Canada Militia Act 1808 states that all males between ages of sixteen and sixty are required to enroll as militiamen and are to be called out once a year for exercises
- The Legislative Assembly of Quebec criticizes the swearing-in of Ezekiel Hart because he is of Jewish faith, and votes his expulsion.

== Births ==
- April – Charles Wilson, politician (d.1877)
- April 7 – John Langton, businessman, political figure and civil servant (d.1894)
- April 10 – William Annand, 2nd Premier of Nova Scotia (d.1887)
- April 25 – Malcolm Cameron, businessman and politician (d.1876)
- August 15 or September 16 – Charles Fisher, politician and 1st Premier of the Colony of New Brunswick (d.1880)
- September 14 – Edwin Atwater, businessperson and municipal politician (d.1874)
- October 20 – Narcisse-Fortunat Belleau, lawyer, businessman and politician (d.1894)

== Deaths ==
- November 10 : Guy Carleton, 1st Baron Dorchester, military and governor
- Peter Russell (politician), judge

== Historical documents ==
Treasury Secretary tells President Jefferson that unless there's change in European affairs, "I see no alternative but war. But with whom?"

British newspaper reports 5,000 troops are on transports at Portsmouth to sail to North America accompanied by 5 ships of the line

British foreword to U.S. pamphlet labels "affairs of the United States" important since U.S. became commercial rivals and "challengers in war"

U.S. embargo on trade has given Canada and Nova Scotia sole access to Europe and West Indies, formerly markets of northern states

Embargo means Canadas' "commercial intercourse with the States must increase," as will ship construction and trade in hemp and naval stores

Total 116 British ships of the line (2 in North America) along with 50-gun warships are naval force "superior to that of the whole world beside"

John Jacob Astor seeks approval of U.S. government to take continental fur trade away from Canada

=== Lower Canada ===
Lower Town Quebec City deserves proper fire insurance coverage because its layout relative to winds and river make it less vulnerable to fire

House of Assembly committee reports that provincial bank would reduce loss of specie in unfavourable balance of trade with U.S.A.

Defeated candidate in Assembly election in Trois-Rivières petitions it not to seat winner Ezekiel Hart as he is Jewish and can't take oath

Assembly passes "An Act for disabling Judges from being elected, or from sitting and voting in the House of Assembly" (defeated in Council)

Winner of Assembly seat for Huntingdon County thanks voters for seeing through rival's "falsehoods, the most gross and most barefaced"

To be established: "An Academy for the instruction of all Members [elected] to serve in the ensuing House of Assembly" who can't read or write

Vermont town meetings are being held to seek embargo repeal, which would be better than exporting timber by force on Lake Champlain

Young Army officers are advised to play billiards to learn "dislodging[...]an enemy; taking a secure position; making famous coups de main" etc.

Dancing teacher will show children "the present style of dancing, conceiving it of no utility to [teach] steps and figures of the Old School"

Aging bachelor who "dislikes contradiction and has been accustomed to have his own way" seeks patient, calm, middle-age woman housekeeper

=== Upper Canada ===
Beginning five years of study with lawyer, Sandwich man tells his brother of local "apprehensions of war" with U.S.A.

Isaac Brock is alerted to U.S. troop movements to Detroit and Great Lakes, and capture of British boats carrying supplies to Indigenous people

Lt.-Gov. Gore sent for because of Indigenous people's "very violent resolutions" on blockage of their annual supplies by U.S. officials

(Probably) John Norton's ideas for increasing financial support for Indigenous peoples on Grand River and moving them to reserve near Lake Huron

Elite grammar school in Cornwall affords excellent education "without endangering the morals of the pupils by the contagion of the vices of a city"

Lake Erie Anglican mission reports "900 Papists, 200 Protestants, Professors of the Church 150, Scotch Dissenters 50 [and 5,000] Heathens and Infidels"

Parishioners' contract in call to minister in Williamsburg township details his duties and annual salary, food supplies and firewood

"Be not puffed up nor exalted one above another" - in meekness and diffidence, Friends know they are saved by grace "and that not of ourselves"

While noting settlers' limited diet, St. Joseph Island merchant derides Indigenous use of fish (Note: racial stereotypes)

=== Nova Scotia ===
N.S. and New Brunswick are key to Britain for their large and convenient harbours, and their ability to supply British West Indies when U.S.A. won't

Convoy of ships to West Indies carries fish, oil, claret and brandy, lumber, staves and shingles, flour, bread, meat, rice etc.

Because of rebellion in Spain against French domination, dozens of Spanish prisoners of war in Halifax are freed and sent to Havana

"Loyal and spirited behaviour" of Acadian militia regiment is noted when it supplies more than required number of volunteers for duty

"Your petitioners are far from pretending to advocate Slavery as a System," but want such still-legal ownership either secured or compensated

Resident says Shelburne people are uneasy about local Indigenous people, but he finds them not dangerous, just "almost every Day Beging about town"

Minister says that of more than 400 families in his township, only 36 are Anglican, "the rest being nondiscripts of no settled principles"

=== New Brunswick ===
Feeling they were not called up legally, militiamen are deserting to go farm and fish, there being not enough workers to cover for them

Widow of Assembly member who drowned in 1803 and left her with 5 small children and estate "found insolvent" petitions for "pecuniary relief"

Ship anchored in Bliss Harbour travels 3 miles at 15 knots before anchor cable is cut, freeing whale that was probably chasing herring

=== Newfoundland ===
Instead of land grant, fishery is regulated by giving fishing room to applicant who then has exclusive right to fish adjacent waters

Anglican missionaries in Newfoundland, numbering only three, preach at St. John's, Harbour Grace and Carbonear, and Trinity

=== Labrador ===
Inuit "miserably manage" their children's education "and harm must almost inevitably ensue from their very habits of living together"

"Comfort, instruction, and spiritual refreshment" - Missionaries disappointed when supply ship brings no letters or texts from war-torn Germany

=== Hudson's Bay Company ===
Ice breakup floods Fort Albany, with water rising even higher than "dreadful deluge" of 1794 and dark of night adding "to the terror of the Scene"

Albany men damage fur bundles by putting them in canoe with seams "so much opened by the sun so as admit a mans finger" and then not drying them

=== Elsewhere ===
British are losing claims to Michigan properties because of "American rascality" and U.S. law requiring continuous cultivation of land

Prince Edward Island has black birch (Betula nigra), which is used in shipbuilding, has light colour like mahogany and "takes as good a polish"

Painting: old soldier tells his story
