= 1809 in Canada =

- Decades: 1780s; 1790s; 1800s; 1810s; 1820s
- See also: History of Canada; Timeline of Canadian history; List of years in Canada

Events from the year 1809 in Canada.

== Incumbents ==
- Monarch: George III

=== Parliaments of Canada ===
- Parliament of Lower Canada: 5th (April 10 – May 18)
- Parliament of Upper Canada: 5th (starting February 2)

=== Governors ===
- Governor of the Canadas: James Henry Craig
- Governor of New Brunswick: Thomas Carleton
- Governor of Nova Scotia: George Prevost
- Commodore-Governor of Newfoundland: John Holloway
- Governor of Prince Edward Island: Joseph Frederick Wallet DesBarres
- Governor of Upper Canada: Francis Gore

== Events ==
- On August 17, the foundation of Nelson's Column, Montreal was laid.
- November 3: John Molson's steamboat, PS Accommodation, starts for Quebec City. It is 85 feet (26 m) overall, has a 6 horsepower (4.5 kW) engine, and makes the distance in 36 hours, but stops at night and reaches Quebec on November 6. The Accommodation is the second steamboat in America, and probably the world.
- From 1809 to 1811, Tecumseh, Shawnee chief, and the Prophet campaign to unite tribes of the Great Lakes, Ohio Valley, and Southeast against the United States. His brother Tenskwatawa, the Shawnee Prophet, is defeated at the Battle of Tippecanoe in 1811.
- Napoleon's continental blockade cuts British access to Scandinavian timber.
- The North West Company builds Fort Gibraltar.

== Births ==
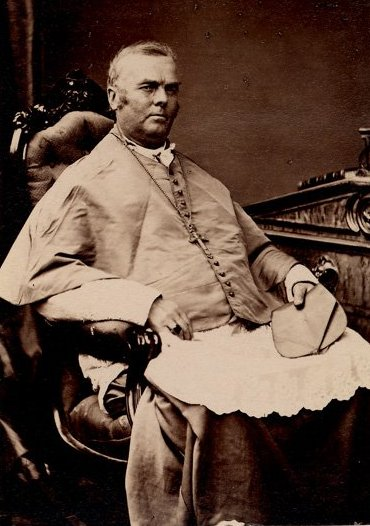
Modeste Demers

- January 31 – Lemuel Allan Wilmot, lawyer, politician, judge, and 3rd Lieutenant Governor of New Brunswick (d.1878)
- March 27 – Jean-Louis Beaudry, entrepreneur, politician and 11th Mayor of Montreal (d.1886)
- May 15 – Pierre-Eustache Dostaler, politician (d.1884)
- June 15 – François-Xavier Garneau, notary, civil servant, poet and historian (d.1866)
- July 25 – Jonathan McCully, politician (d.1877)
- October 11 – Modeste Demers, missionary (d.1871)
- November 15 – Charles La Rocque, priest and third Bishop of Saint-Hyacinthe (d.1875)
- November 24 – Amos Wright, politician (d.1886)

== Deaths ==
- July 3 – Joseph Quesnel, musician (b. 1746)

== Historical documents ==
Map: British North America and northeastern U.S.A. (Lake Superior to Newfoundland and James Bay to Virginia, with names of Indigenous nations)

Quebec editorial warns that U.S.A. has such strong home advantage that even were its seaports "laid in ashes," it would be "unvanquished"

New Hampshire Congressman says "the zeal of the inhabitants of the U.S. as to marching into Canada is very much diminished"

Town meetings from coast to interior of Massachusetts and New York are resolved against embargo, even though it is good alternative to war

Satirical editorial laments embargo repeal and blames Jefferson for "the storm he has so jacobinically raised among the starving Sans culottes"

Indication from Congress is that embargo will be lifted on March 4 (note: that was last day of President Jefferson's administration)

President James Madison informs Congress of growing U.S.-U.K. reconciliation and hoped-for resumption of trade on June 10

Michigan's Gov. Hull advises "Ottawa and Chippewa Nations" at Michilimackinac not to listen to British advice

Map: British North America (including Hudson Bay and Baffin Bay)

=== Lower Canada ===
Gov. Gen. Craig tells L.C. parliament to extend benefits from U.S. embargo by ending "causeless jealousies and suspicions amongst yourselves"

After controversy in 1808, Assembly resolves "that Ezekiel Hart, Esquire, possessing the Jewish religion, cannot sit, nor vote in this House"

Craig orders election to replace current Assembly, citing members' "fruitless debates" and "private and personal animosities"

"The pertinacious obstinacy and deep rooted prejudices of the lower classes" against smallpox vaccination are crimes against their children

Models are being made in Trois-Rivières for iron machinery for steamboat that is to begin service from Montreal

"The [ice] road across the river was hardly made when the streets of Montreal were crowded with American sleighs," with 500 more bringing farm products

Road to Quebec City from head of Connecticut River would allow supply of beef that would drive down price "one or two pence on the pound"

Obituary of Jean Baptiste Lahaille says his teaching in Seminary of Quebec "enabled his young auditors to follow him[...]almost without effort"

Saint-Roch brewery thanks Quebec City garrison and citizens for so successfully containing malt house fire with their fire engines

Thief awaiting pardon right up to his execution was mistaken believing Crown issues reprieves that would compromise public welfare

At trial of dueller, judge explains homicide, manslaughter and murder, plus "Point of Honour" as extralegal but valid consideration

Two Ste. Famille parish men are fined £20 each for hiding deserter, but regiment returns £15 to one called extremely poor and contrite

Details of "the most daring robbery we ever heard of in the province, surpassing for hardihood every thing [likely in] persons of this country"

Praising Parliament bill protecting animals, especially overrun, overdriven and overburdened horses, editorial sees need for same in L.C.

Canadian Courant reports 200 "hardy Americans" have arrived or are coming to seigneury near Montreal to fulfill lumber contracts

"A Steady respectable Young or Middle aged man [is wanted] as an Out-Door Clerk" residing summer and fall on timber grounds at Wolfe's Cove

Just imported: men's beaver, silk and "Beaver water proof" hats, servants' camel hair hats, and hats for children, ladies and "Country merchants"

"Othello" to be performed "with entire new Dresses, &c.;" gentlemen are requested to buy tickets in lobby and not give money to doorkeeper

Review of performances in The Honey Moon range from "a Chef d'œuvre of theatric Art" to "get rid of a languishing drawl"

Literary Society of Quebec will give silver medal to "the best verses in the English, French or Latin Languages" on King George's birth

Scenes in new wax museum in Quebec City include "the death of Lord Nelson, in his last moments, attended by his Captain and Lieut."

Masked ball at Government House and terrace includes people dressed as "a Gentleman Jew[,] an old French Lady of the last century" etc.

L.C. resident has vision of three golden carriages, three angels and God's warning

=== Upper Canada ===
"[In] Soil, Climate and Government, Upper Canada may vie with any part of the globe [and will soon] become one of our most flourishing Colonies"

Quaker Timothy Rogers notes epidemic of typhus that on and near Yonge St. kills "about thirty[...]and considerable numbers in other places"

Six Nations chiefs tell William Claus that "the cause of our misfortune" is land and "we have been very foolish & parted with our lands"

Petition of 8 justices of the peace for remission of 7 jailed men's fines which they can't pay, or "they must suffer a perpetual imprisonment"

Watertown, N.Y. report that 50 "Canadian Tories" came over from Kingston, U.C. and forcibly took 80 barrels of potash seized by officials

Salt storage offered along Niagara because "carriers[...]on the British [and] American side of the river[...]leave salt exposed to the weather"

Quakers' right to affirm or declare (instead of swear) in any case where oath usually is required is extended to "Menonists and Tunkers"

John Strachan's lectures on natural philosophy are for "young Gentlemen who [want] a knowledge of this, the most[...]interesting of all the Sciences"

=== Nova Scotia ===
Anglican minister says he has many congregants but few Church members in Rawdon, but is happy with Newport though "the Baptists are numerous"

Glebe rent is not higher given how much pasture is needed to fatten one ox, how long it is (12 years) before stump land can be plowed, etc.

Commission declares Halifax merchant "a lunatic" and he, his property and his debts are to go under protection of his wife and two others

Minister says new schoolmaster has clear voice, is good reader and "compleat master of psalmody" and has much better education than most

=== New Brunswick ===
Jonathan Odell states that no purchase or lease of Indigenous land is allowed unless "with the full consent of every Man of the tribe"

Mi'kmaq Julien, Viense and other families petition government for "vacant" 2-mile stretch of Nipisiguit River near Bay of Chaleur

Charlotte County report notes "great loss of timber" since price rose on greater demand, with 20,000 tons of squared pine amassed

School will teach girls reading, writing, sewing and embroidery, and boys reading, writing, arithmetic and "Merchant's Accounts"

=== Labrador ===
Some Inuit maintain Christian habits while out on land, including singing hymns, praying together and saying "what the Lord had done for them"

Labrador missionary suffers swelling in legs accompanied by "St. Anthony's Fire" (which might be shingles or ergotism or erysipelas)

=== Elsewhere ===
Funding set for "Proper Buildings for[...]General Assembly, the Supreme Court and its Offices" and other uses in Charlottetown and other P.E.I. counties

Several ships coming from St. John's are dismasted or missing in heavy gales, and ones that left last winter and fall are not heard of since
