= 1805 in Canada =

- Decades: 1780s; 1790s; 1800s; 1810s; 1820s
- See also: History of Canada; Timeline of Canadian history; List of years in Canada

Events from the year 1805 in Canada.

== Incumbents ==
- Monarch: George III

=== Federal government ===
- Parliament of Lower Canada: 4th (starting January 9)
- Parliament of Upper Canada: 4th (starting February 1)

=== Governors ===
- Governor of the Canadas: Robert Milnes then Thomas Dunn
- Governor of New Brunswick: Thomas Carleton
- Governor of Nova Scotia: John Wentworth
- Commodore-Governor of Newfoundland: Erasmus Gower
- Governor of Prince Edward Island: Joseph Frederick Wallet DesBarres
- Governor of Upper Canada: Peter Hunter (until 21 August)

== Events ==
- January 29 – 4th Parliament of Lower Canada session starts, ends April 27, 1808
- February 1 – 4th Parliament of Upper Canada session starts, ends May 21, 1808
- 100th Regiment of Foot (Prince Regent's County of Dublin Regiment) arrives in Nova Scotia
- Vermont passes an act to establish the line between it and Canada.

== Births ==
- February 16 – Edmund Walker Head, Governor General (d.1868)
- August 26 – Joseph-Bruno Guigues, first bishop of the diocese of Bytown (Ottawa) (d.1874)
- December 8 – Amand Landry, farmer and politician (d.1877)

=== Full date unknown ===
- John Kent, Premier of Newfoundland (d.1872)

== Deaths ==
- March 23 – Richard Dobie, an early Canadian businessman and a sometimes partner of Benjamin Frobisher (born 1731)
