= 1950 in Canada =

- Decades: 1930s; 1940s; 1950s; 1960s; 1970s
- See also: History of Canada; Timeline of Canadian history; List of years in Canada

Events from the year 1950 in Canada.

== Incumbents ==
=== Crown ===
- Monarch – George VI

=== Federal government ===
- Governor General – the Viscount Alexander of Tunis
- Prime Minister – Louis St. Laurent
- Chief Justice – Thibaudeau Rinfret (Quebec)
- Parliament – 21st

=== Provincial governments ===
==== Lieutenant governors ====
- Lieutenant Governor of Alberta – John C. Bowen (until February 1) then John J. Bowlen
- Lieutenant Governor of British Columbia – Charles Arthur Banks (until October 1) then Clarence Wallace
- Lieutenant Governor of Manitoba – Roland Fairbairn McWilliams
- Lieutenant Governor of New Brunswick – David Laurence MacLaren
- Lieutenant Governor of Newfoundland – Leonard Outerbridge
- Lieutenant Governor of Nova Scotia – John Alexander Douglas McCurdy
- Lieutenant Governor of Ontario – Ray Lawson
- Lieutenant Governor of Prince Edward Island – Joseph Alphonsus Bernard (until October 4) then Thomas William Lemuel Prowse
- Lieutenant Governor of Quebec – Eugène Fiset (until October 3) then Gaspard Fauteux
- Lieutenant Governor of Saskatchewan – John Michael Uhrich

==== Premiers ====
- Premier of Alberta – Ernest Manning
- Premier of British Columbia – Byron Johnson
- Premier of Manitoba – Douglas Campbell
- Premier of New Brunswick – John McNair
- Premier of Newfoundland – Joey Smallwood
- Premier of Nova Scotia – Angus Macdonald
- Premier of Ontario – Leslie Frost
- Premier of Prince Edward Island – J. Walter Jones
- Premier of Quebec – Maurice Duplessis
- Premier of Saskatchewan – Tommy Douglas

=== Territorial governments ===
==== Commissioners ====
- Commissioner of Yukon – John Edward Gibben (until August 15) then Andrew Harold Gibson
- Commissioner of Northwest Territories – Hugh Llewellyn Keenleyside (until November 14) then Hugh Andrew Young

== Events ==
- January 14 - The first non-stop trans-Canada flight is made
- February 14 - Nancy Hodges of British Columbia becomes the first woman in the Commonwealth elected speaker of a legislature
- Early May - The Winnipeg Flood along the Red River causes immense damage and one death in Winnipeg
- May 29 - The St. Roch becomes the first vessel to circumnavigate North America
- August 7 - Canada joins a United Nations force to fight in Korean War
- August 22 – August 30 - Rail workers strike shuts down much of the Canadian economy
- October 31 - The oil pipeline linking Edmonton to Sarnia is completed
- November 28 - Canada joins onto the Colombo Plan
- December 18 - Korean War: First Canadian troops arrive in Korea.

=== Full date unknown ===
- Cité libre magazine is first published
- British Columbia Provincial Police are disestablished.

== Arts and literature ==
=== Awards ===
- See 1950 Governor General's Awards for a complete list of winners and nominees for those awards.
- Stephen Leacock Award: Earle Birney, Turvey

== Sport ==
- April 23 - The Detroit Red Wings win their fourth Stanley Cup by defeating the New York Rangers 4 games to 3. Due to scheduling conflicts at Madison Square Garden, all of the Rangers' home games were played at Maple Leaf Gardens in Toronto
- May 6 - The Quebec Junior Hockey League's Montreal Junior Canadiens win their first Memorial Cup by defeating the Saskatchewan Junior Hockey League's Regina Pats 4 games to 1. All games were held at Montreal Forum.
- November 25 - The Toronto Argonauts win their ninth Grey Cup by defeating the Winnipeg Blue Bombers 13–0 in the 38th Grey Cup played at Varsity Stadium in Toronto

== Births ==
=== January to March ===
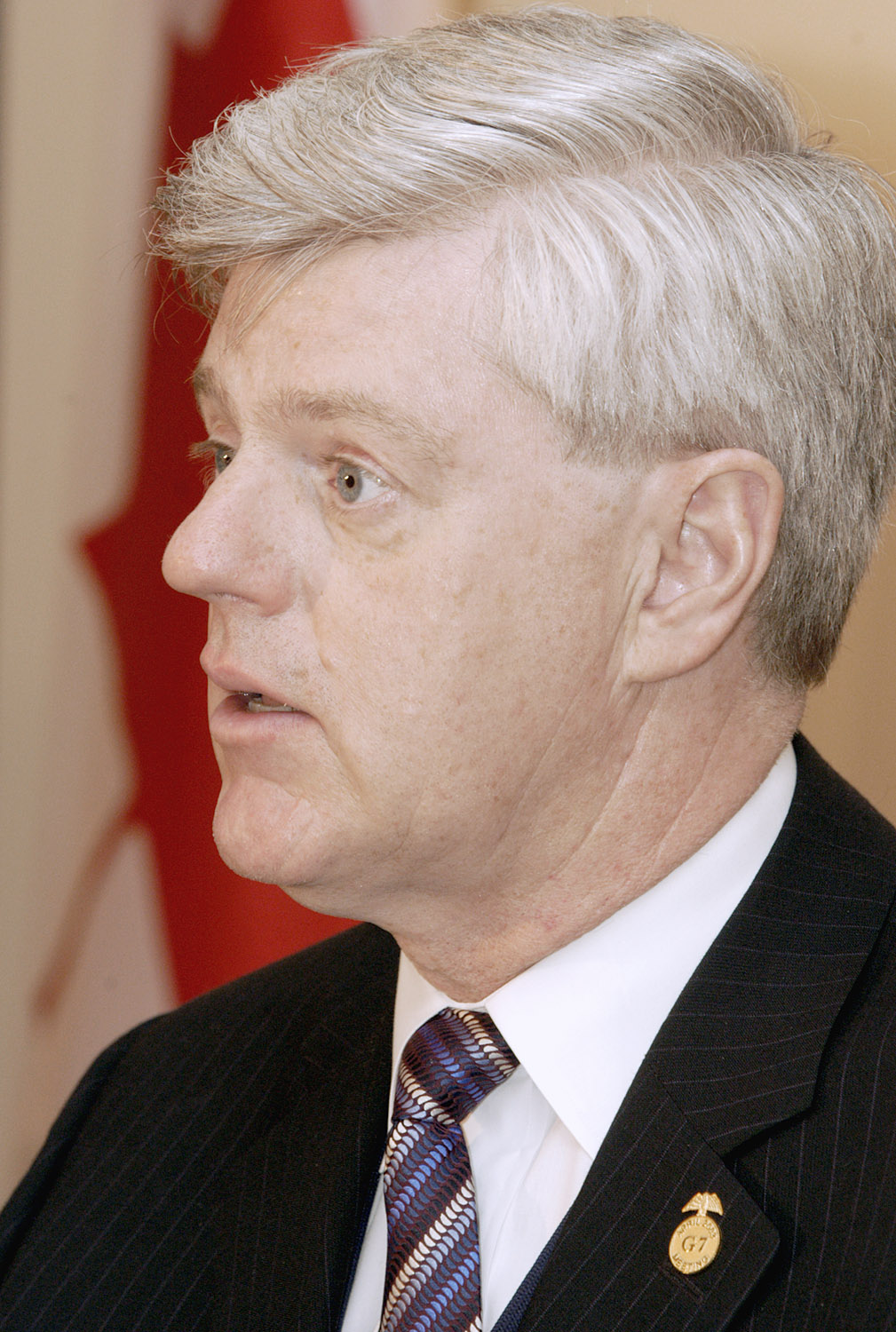
John Manley

- January 5
  - Tom Benner, sculptor (d. 2022)
  - John Manley, lawyer, businessman and politician, Deputy Prime Minister
- January 13 - Joe Fontana, politician
- January 17 - Jean Poirier, politician
- January 18 - Gilles Villeneuve, motor racing driver (d. 1982)
- February 2 - Kevin Gillis, writer, producer and director
- February 8 - Keith Milligan, politician
- February 9 - Tom Wappel, politician
- February 12 - Michael Ironside, actor, voice actor, producer, film director and screenwriter
- March 6 - Bruce Simpson, pole vaulter
- March 17 - Jackson Davies, actor
- March 23 - Jerry Storie, politician
- March 23 - Ralph Eichler, politician
- March 26 - Martin Short, comedian, actor, writer, singer and producer

=== April to June ===
- April 1 - Daniel Paillé, leader of the Bloc Québécois
- April 16 - Robert Dutil, Canadian businessman and politician
- April 19 - Gérard Asselin, politician and MP for Charlevoix and Manicouagan (1993-2011) (d. 2013)
- May 2 - Jose Kusugak, Inuk politician (d. 2011)
- May 10 – Dale Wilson, voice actor
- May 12 - Louise Portal, actress, singer, and director
- May 27 - Brent St. Denis, politician
- June 1 - Perrin Beatty, corporate executive and politician
- June 7 - John Wood, Olympic canoeist (d. 2013)
- June 12 - David Onley, broadcaster and Lieutenant Governor of Ontario (d. 2023)
- June 19 - Rosie Shuster, comedy writer and actress
- June 21 - Anne Carson, poet, essayist, translator and professor of Classics and comparative literature
- June 25 – Barbara Gowdy, novelist
- June 27 - Rick Cluff, radio journalist (d. 2024)

=== July to September ===
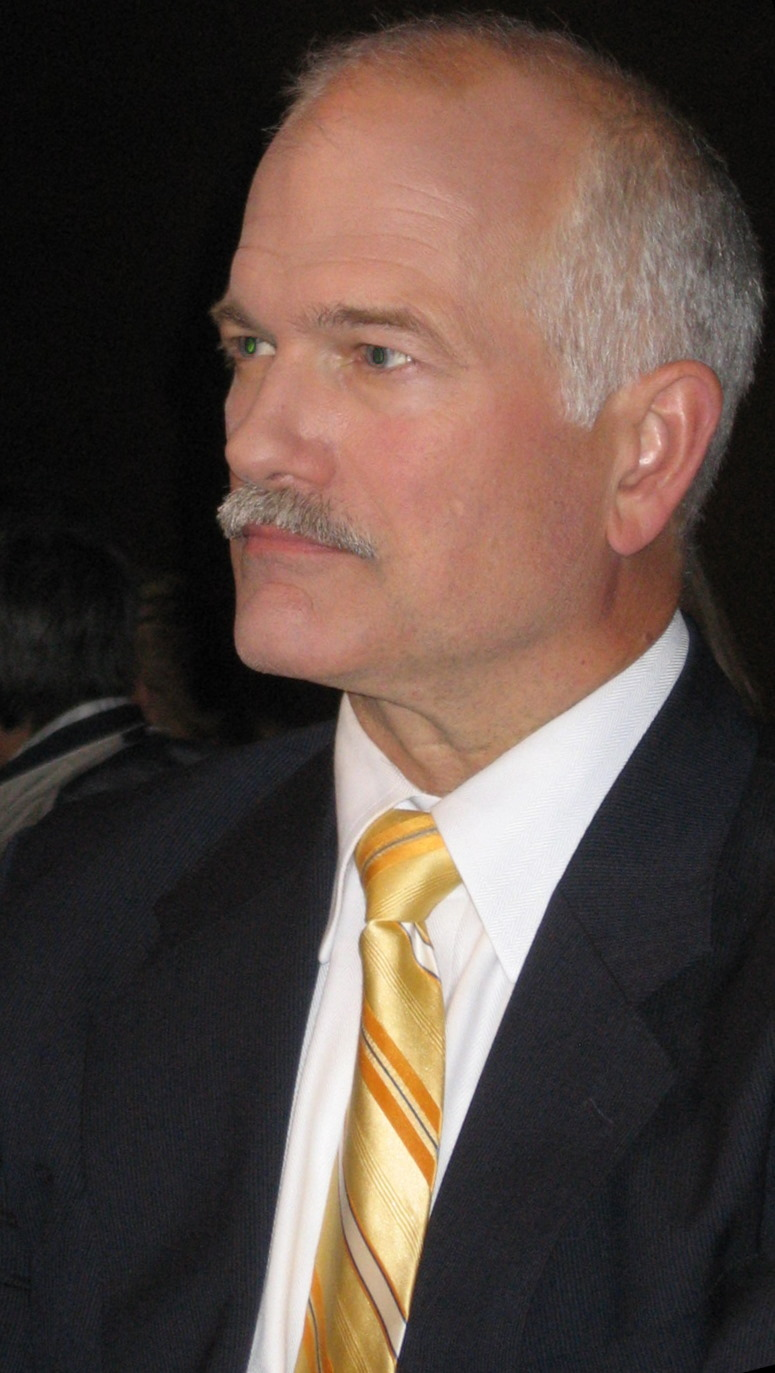
Jack Layton

- July 2 - Lee Maracle, writer and academic (d. 2021)
- July 5 - Deepak Obhrai, politician (d. 2019)
- July 6 - Hélène Scherrer, politician and Minister
- July 7 - Leon Benoit, politician
- July 18 - Jack Layton, politician, leader of New Democratic Party of Canada (2003-2011) and Leader of the Official Opposition (2011) (d. 2011)
- July 20 - Lucille Lemay, archer
- August 2 - Sue Rodriguez, advocate for assisted suicide (d. 1994)
- August 6 - Carole Pope, rock singer-songwriter
- August 15 - Ron Lemieux, ice hockey player and politician
- August 16 - Stockwell Day, politician
- August 31 - Anne McLellan, academic, politician, Minister and Deputy Prime Minister of Canada
- September 8 - Richard Henry Bain, criminal who is charged with the September 4, 2012, Montreal, Quebec, shooting that killed Denis Blanchette.
- September 9 - Janis Babson (d. 1961)
- September 16 - Sheila Fraser, Auditor General of Canada
- September 18 - Darryl Sittler, ice hockey player

=== October to December ===
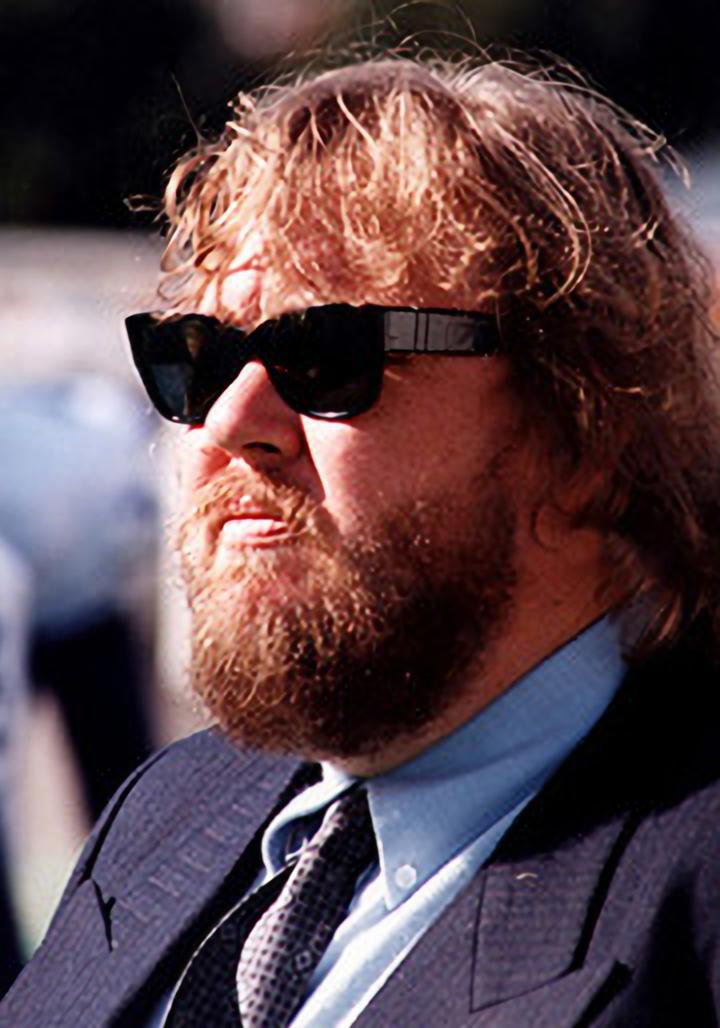
John Candy

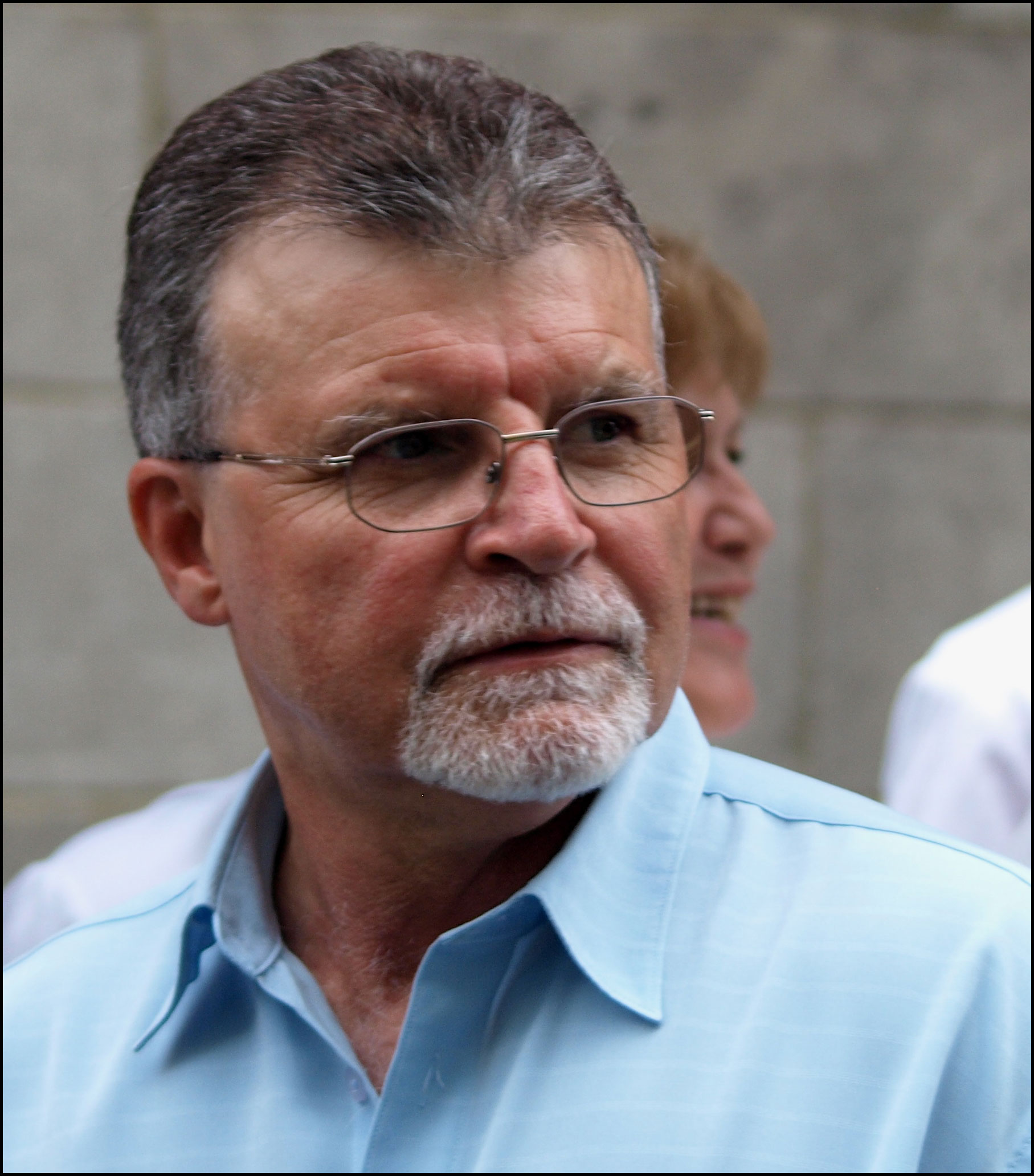
Dennis Fentie

- October 17 – Val Ross, writer and journalist (d. 2008)
- October 31 - John Candy, comedian and actor (d. 1994)
- November 2 - Wendy Lill, playwright and politician
- November 2 - Daryl Reid, politician
- November 5 - Susan Nattrass, sport shooter
- November 8 - Dennis Fentie, politician and 7th Premier of the Yukon
- November 14 - Colleen Peterson, singer (d. 1996)
- December 18 - Martha Johnson, pop singer and songwriter
- December 20 - Carolyn Bennett, politician
- December 21 - Lap-Chee Tsui, geneticist

=== Full date unknown ===
- David Barr, Commander of the Canadian Special Operations Forces Command
- Denis Simpson, singer and actor (d. 2010)

== Deaths ==
=== January to June ===
- February 7 - Thomas Langton Church, politician and Mayor of Toronto (b. 1870)
- April 7 - Walter Huston, actor (b. 1884)

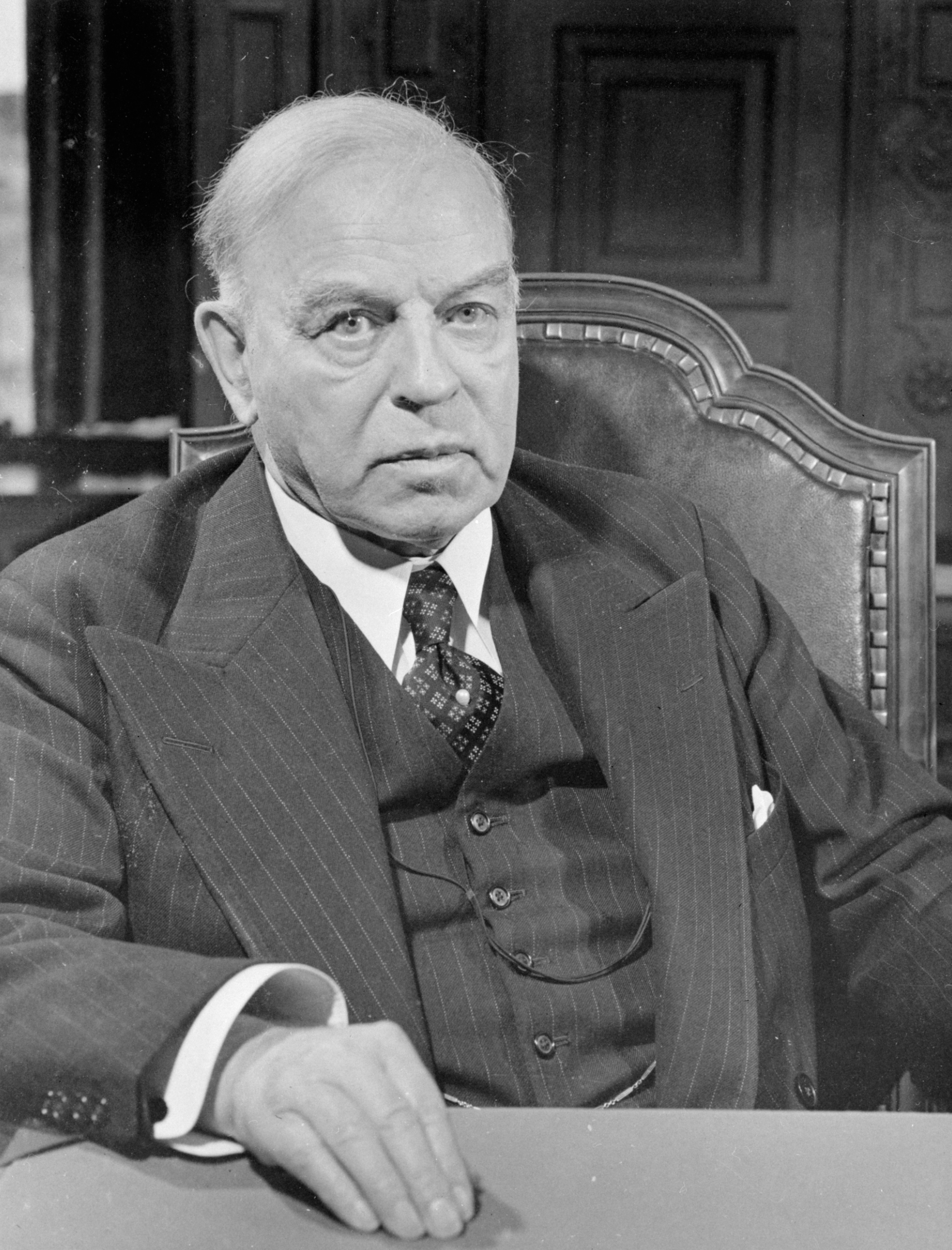
William Lyon Mackenzie King

- May 15 - Hervé-Edgar Brunelle, politician and lawyer (b. 1891)
- June 28 - James Allison Glen, politician, Minister and Speaker of the House of Commons of Canada (b. 1877)

=== July to December ===
- July 22 - William Lyon Mackenzie King, lawyer, economist, university professor, civil servant, journalist, politician and 10th Prime Minister of Canada (b. 1874)
- July 25 - Gleason Belzile, politician (b. 1898)
- August 1 - Humphrey Mitchell, politician and trade unionist (b. 1894)
- August 2 - Pierre-François Casgrain, politician and Speaker of the House of Commons of Canada (b. 1886)
- October 19 - Charles Ballantyne, politician, Leader of the Opposition in the Senate (b. 1867)
- November 11 - John Knox Blair, politician, physician and teacher (b. 1873)

=== Full date unknown ===
- William Sanford Evans, politician (b. 1869)

== See also ==
- List of Canadian films
