= 4th Parliament of Lower Canada =

Parliament of Lower Canada 1805–1808

The 4th Parliament of Lower Canada was in session from January 9, 1805, to April 27, 1808. Elections to the Legislative Assembly in Lower Canada had been held in July 1804. All sessions were held at Quebec City.

== Members ==
Riding	Member	First elected / previously elected	No. of terms
Bedford	William Sturge Moore (1805)	1805	1st term
Buckinghamshire	François Legendre	1804	1st term
Buckinghamshire	Louis Proulx	1804	1st term
Cornwallis	Jacques-Nicolas Perrault	1804	1st term
Cornwallis	Alexandre Roy	1804	1st term
Devon	Jean-Baptiste Fortin	1804	1st term
Devon	François Bernier	1796	3rd term
Dorchester	Jean-Thomas Taschereau	1800	2nd term
Dorchester	John Caldwell	1800	2nd term
Effingham	André Nadon	1800	2nd term
Effingham	Thomas Porteous	1804	1st term
Gaspé	George Pyke	1804	1st term
Hampshire	Antoine-Louis Juchereau Duchesnay	1804	1st term
Hampshire	Joseph-Bernard Planté	1796	3rd term
Hertford	Louis Turgeon	1804	1st term
Hertford	Étienne-Ferréol Roy	1804	1st term
Huntingdon	Alexander MacKenzie	1804	1st term
Huntingdon	Jean-Baptiste Raymond	1800	2nd term
Kent	François Viger	1800	2nd term
Kent	Pierre Weilbrenner	1804	1st term
Leinster	Jean Archambault	1800	2nd term
Leinster	Charles-Gaspard Tarieu de Lanaudière	1796, (Note: Warwick) 1804	2nd term*
Montreal County	Benjamin Joseph Frobisher	1804	1st term
Montreal County	Louis Roy Portelance	1804	1st term
Montreal East	James McGill	1800	2nd term
Montreal East	Louis Chaboillez	1804	1st term
Montreal West	John Richardson	1804	1st term
Montreal West	Jean-Marie Mondelet	1804	1st term
Northumberland	Pierre-Stanislas Bédard	1792	4th term
Northumberland	Jean-Marie Poulin	1800	2nd term
Orléans	Jérôme Martineau	1796	3rd term
Quebec County	Pierre-Amable de Bonne	1792	4th term
Quebec County	Michel-Amable Berthelot Dartigny	1800	2nd term
Quebec (Lower Town)	Ignace-Michel-Louis-Antoine d'Irumberry de Salaberry	1792, (Note: Dorchester) 1804	2nd term*
Quebec (Lower Town)	John Young	1792	4th term
Quebec (Upper Town)	Jean-Antoine Panet	1792	4th term
Quebec (Upper Town)	William Grant (Note: died in October 1805; John Blackwood was elected in a by-election held in December 1805.)	1792	4th term
Quebec (Upper Town)	John Blackwood (1805)	1805	1st term
Richelieu	Louis Bourdages	1804	1st term
Richelieu	Louis Brodeur	1804	1st term
Saint-Maurice	David Monro	1804	1st term
Saint-Maurice	Michel Caron	1804	1st term
Surrey	Jacques Cartier	1804	1st term
Surrey	Noël de Rastel de Rocheblave	1804	1st term
Trois-Rivières	John Lees (Note: died in March 1807; Ezekiel Hart was elected in a by-election held in April 1807.)	1792	4th term
Trois-Rivières	Ezekiel Hart (1807) (Note: expelled in February 1808 because he was Jewish.)	1807	1st term
Trois-Rivières	Louis-Charles Foucher	1800	2nd term
Warwick	Ross Cuthbert	1800	2nd term
Warwick	James Cuthbert	1796	3rd term
William-Henry	Jonathan Sewell	1796	3rd term
York	Nicolas-Eustache Lambert Dumont	1804	1st term
York	John Mure	1804	1st term
