= 1886 in Canada =

- Decades: 1860s; 1870s; 1880s; 1890s; 1900s
- See also: History of Canada; Timeline of Canadian history; List of years in Canada

Events from the year 1886 in Canada.

== Incumbents ==
=== Crown ===
- Monarch – Victoria

=== Federal government ===
- Governor General – Henry Petty-Fitzmaurice
- Prime Minister – John A. Macdonald
- Chief Justice – William Johnstone Ritchie (New Brunswick)
- Parliament – 5th

=== Provincial governments ===
==== Lieutenant governors ====
- Lieutenant Governor of British Columbia – Clement Francis Cornwall
- Lieutenant Governor of Manitoba – James Cox Aikins
- Lieutenant Governor of New Brunswick – Samuel Leonard Tilley
- Lieutenant Governor of Nova Scotia – Matthew Henry Richey
- Lieutenant Governor of Ontario – John Beverley Robinson
- Lieutenant Governor of Prince Edward Island – Andrew Archibald Macdonald
- Lieutenant Governor of Quebec – Louis-Rodrigue Masson

==== Premiers ====
- Premier of British Columbia – William Smithe
- Premier of Manitoba – John Norquay
- Premier of New Brunswick – Andrew George Blair
- Premier of Nova Scotia – William Stevens Fielding
- Premier of Ontario – Oliver Mowat
- Premier of Prince Edward Island – William Wilfred Sullivan
- Premier of Quebec – John Jones Ross

=== Territorial governments ===
==== Lieutenant governors ====
- Lieutenant Governor of Keewatin – James Cox Aikins
- Lieutenant Governor of the North-West Territories – Edgar Dewdney

== Events ==
- March 25 – Workman's Compensation Act passed in Ontario
- April 6 – Vancouver incorporated as a city
- April 26 – 1886 New Brunswick general election
- June 7 – Elzéar-Alexandre Taschereau becomes the first Canadian cardinal
- June 8 to 15 – 1886 Nova Scotia general election: William Stevens Fielding's Liberals win a third consecutive majority.
- June 13 – Great Vancouver Fire
- June 30 – 1886 Prince Edward Island general election: William Wilfred Sullivan Conservatives win a fifth consecutive majority.
- July 20 – 1886 British Columbia general election
- October 14 – 1886 Quebec general election: Honoré Mercier's Liberals win a majority
- December 9 – 1886 Manitoba general election
- December 14 – Yoho National Park established
- December 28 – 1886 Ontario general election: Sir Oliver Mowat's Liberals win a fifth consecutive majority.

=== Full date unknown ===
- Mohawk men of the Caughnawaga Reserve in Quebec are trained to help build a bridge across the St. Lawrence River, beginning a tradition of high steel construction work among the Iroquois.
- Construction begins on the Banff Springs Hotel

== Births ==
- January 15 – C. D. Howe, politician and Minister (d.1960)
- January 21 – George Kingston, meteorologist (b.1816)
- May 13 – William John Patterson, politician and 6th Premier of Saskatchewan (d.1976)
- August 4 – Pierre-François Casgrain, politician and Speaker of the House of Commons of Canada (d.1950)
- August 30 – Ray Lawson, 17th Lieutenant Governor of Ontario (d.1980)
- September 20 – John Murray Anderson, Canadian-born American actor, dancer, theatre director (d. 1954 in the United States)
- October 16 – Joseph-Arthur Bradette, politician (d.1961)

== Deaths ==
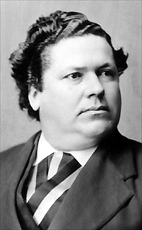
Joseph-Alfred Mousseau

- March 30 – Joseph-Alfred Mousseau, politician and 6th Premier of Quebec (b.1837)
- March 31 – Amos Wright, farmer and politician (b.1809)
- June 25
  - Auguste Achintre, journalist and essayist (b.1834)
  - Jean-Louis Beaudry, entrepreneur, politician and 11th Mayor of Montreal (b.1809)
- July 4 – Poundmaker, Cree chief (b. c1842)
- November 23 – William Jack, astronomer (b.1817)
