= 1961 in Canada =

- Decades: 1940s; 1950s; 1960s; 1970s; 1980s
- See also: History of Canada; Timeline of Canadian history; List of years in Canada

Flag of Canada in 1961

Events from the year 1961 in Canada.

== Incumbents ==
=== Crown ===
- Monarch – Elizabeth II

=== Federal government ===
- Governor General – Georges Vanier
- Prime Minister – John Diefenbaker
- Chief Justice – Patrick Kerwin (Ontario)
- Parliament – 24th

=== Provincial governments ===
==== Lieutenant governors ====
- Lieutenant Governor of Alberta – John Percy Page
- Lieutenant Governor of British Columbia – George Pearkes
- Lieutenant Governor of Manitoba – Errick Willis
- Lieutenant Governor of New Brunswick – Joseph Leonard O'Brien
- Lieutenant Governor of Newfoundland – Campbell Leonard Macpherson
- Lieutenant Governor of Nova Scotia – Edward Chester Plow
- Lieutenant Governor of Ontario – John Keiller MacKay
- Lieutenant Governor of Prince Edward Island – Frederick Walter Hyndman
- Lieutenant Governor of Quebec – Onésime Gagnon (until October 12) then Paul Comtois
- Lieutenant Governor of Saskatchewan – Frank Lindsay Bastedo

==== Premiers ====
- Premier of Alberta – Ernest Manning
- Premier of British Columbia – W.A.C. Bennett
- Premier of Manitoba – Dufferin Roblin
- Premier of New Brunswick – Louis Robichaud
- Premier of Newfoundland – Joey Smallwood
- Premier of Nova Scotia – Robert Stanfield
- Premier of Ontario – Leslie Frost (until November 8) then John Robarts
- Premier of Prince Edward Island – Walter Shaw
- Premier of Quebec – Jean Lesage
- Premier of Saskatchewan – Tommy Douglas (until November 7) then Woodrow Lloyd

=== Territorial governments ===
==== Commissioners ====
- Commissioner of Yukon – Frederick Howard Collins
- Commissioner of Northwest Territories – Robert Gordon Robertson

== Events ==
=== January to June ===
- June 1
  - The Canadian Bank of Commerce and the Imperial Bank of Canada merge to form the Canadian Imperial Bank of Commerce.
  - Census Day for the 1961 Census of Canada, which finds Canada has a population of 18,238,247.
- June 6 – CUSO is formed
- June 13 – The NCC study of Ottawa's new Green Belt is completed
- June 14 – James Elliott Coyne, the Governor of the Bank of Canada resigns due to disagreements with the federal government's fiscal policies

=== July to December ===
- August 3 – Tommy Douglas is elected leader of the newly formed New Democratic Party
- August 14 – 15 – The Premiers meet in Charlottetown
- August 26 – The new home for the Hockey Hall of Fame opens in Toronto, at the Canadian National Exhibition.
- October 1 – CTV, Canada's second major television network, begins broadcasting
- November 7 – Woodrow Lloyd becomes premier of Saskatchewan, replacing Tommy Douglas
- November 8 – John Robarts becomes premier of Ontario, replacing Leslie Frost
- November 17 – Saskatchewan passes a bill creating Canada's first government run health system
- December 28 – Canada's first BOMARC Missile squadron is formed

=== Full date unknown ===
- The Co-operative Commonwealth Federation becomes the New Democratic Party
- The Massey Lectures are created
- The transatlantic telephone system is officially launched with a call from Elizabeth II to Prime Minister John Diefenbaker.
- The Canadian Conference of the Arts is established.

== Sport ==
- March 12 – The Trail Smoke Eaters win the 1961 Ice Hockey World Championships for Canada.
- May 5 – The Ontario Hockey Association's Toronto St. Michael's Majors win their fourth (and final) Memorial Cup by defeating the Central Alberta Hockey League's Edmonton Oil Kings 4 games to 2. The deciding Game 6 was played at Edmonton Gardens.
- July 11 – Gene Kiniski becomes the first Canadian to win the AWA World Heavyweight Championship by defeating Verne Gagne
- December 2 – The Winnipeg Blue Bombers win their 6th Grey Cup by defeating the Hamilton Tiger-Cats 21–14 in the 49th Grey Cup at CNE Stadium in Toronto.

== Arts and literature ==
=== New books ===
- Morley Callaghan: A Passion in Rome
- Max Aitken: Courage
- Margaret Atwood: Double Persephone
- Farley Mowat: Owls in the Family

=== Awards ===
- See 1961 Governor General's Awards for a complete list of winners and finalists for those awards.
- Stephen Leacock Award: Norman Ward, Mice in the Beer

== Births ==
=== January to March ===
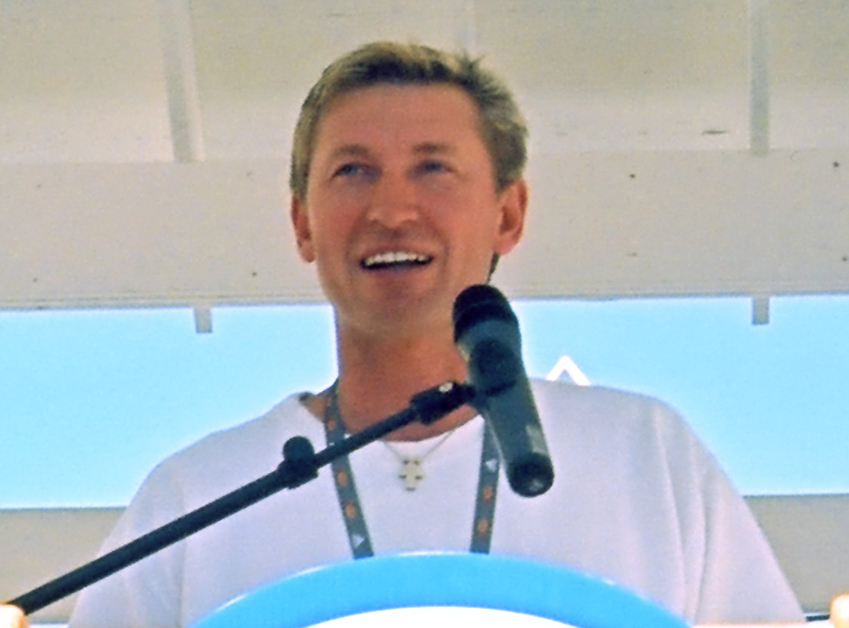
Wayne Gretzky

- January 11 – Graham Welbourn, swimmer
- January 15 - Yves Pelletier, film director and actor
- January 18 – Mark Messier, ice hockey player
- January 26 – Wayne Gretzky, ice hockey player and coach
- January 27 – Tony Clement, politician and Minister
- January 28 – Normand Rochefort, ice hockey player and coach
- February 4 – Connor O'Brien, Canadian skier
- February 10 – Steve Pagendam, boxer
- February 21 – Paul Edwards, politician and lawyer
- February 23 – Silvia Ruegger, long-distance runner (died 2019)
- February 27 – Ann Peel, race walker
- February 28 - René Simard, singer
- March 16 – Todd McFarlane, cartoonist, comic book artist, writer, toy designer and entrepreneur
- March 24 – Pat Turner, rower and Olympic gold medallist

=== April to June ===
- April 6 – Gene Eugene, actor, record producer, engineer, composer and musician (died 2000)
- April 10 – Barb Tarbox, anti-smoking activist (died 2003)
- April 22 – Scott D. Sampson, paleontologist, science communicator and television presenter
- May 1 – Clint Malarchuk, ice hockey player
- May 8 – Greg Thomey, comedian
- May 9 – Darren Praznik, politician
- May 10 – Randy Cunneyworth, Canadian ice hockey player and coach
- June 1 – Paul Coffey, ice hockey player
- June 9 – Michael J. Fox, actor, author and voice over artist

=== July to September ===
- July 1 – Michelle Wright, singer-songwriter
- July 8 – Kelly Kryczka, synchronized swimmer
- July 12 – Camilla Scott, actress and television host
- July 17 – Blair Horn, rower and Olympic gold medallist
- July 23
  - André Ducharme, author, comedian and humorist
  - Richard Martineau, journalist
  - Rob Stewart, actor
- July 24 – Brian McMahon, coxswain and Olympic gold medallist
- July 26 – Alan Lowe, politician
- August 12 – Peter Szmidt, swimmer
- August 20 – Lizanne Bussières, long-distance runner
- August 23 – François Lapointe, racewalker
- August 25 – Dave Tippett, ice hockey player and coach
- September 12 – Mylène Farmer, singer, songwriter, actress and author
- September 16 – Jen Tolley, actress, voice actress and singer
- September 18 – Denis Lambert, boxer
- September 24
  - Nancy Garapick, swimmer and Olympic bronze medallist
  - Luc Picard, actor
- September 25 – Tracy Wilson, ice dancer
- September 27 – Randy Vancourt, composer and entertainer
- September 30 – Erica Ehm, video jockey, songwriter and actress

=== October to December ===
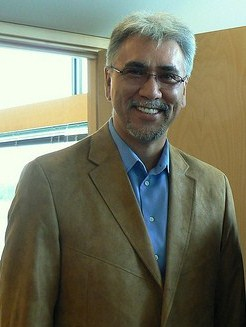
Floyd Roland

- October 16 - Pierre Karl Péladeau, president and CEO of Quebecor Inc., Quebecor Media Inc. and Sun Media Corporation
- October 25 – Alison Webb, judoka
- November 2 – k.d. lang, singer-songwriter
- November 23 – Floyd Roland, politician and 11th Premier of the Northwest Territories
- December 8 – André Bachand, politician
- December 10 – Mark McKoy, hurdler and Olympic gold medallist
- December 11 - Michel Courtemanche, actor
- December 13 – Ranza Clark, middle-distance runner
- December 18 – Brian Orser, figure skater, double Olympic silver medallist and World Champion
- December 30
  - Douglas Coupland, novelist
  - Ben Johnson, Jamaica-born sprinter, double Olympic bronze medallist, Olympic gold medal rescinded as disqualified for doping

== Deaths ==
=== January to June ===
- May 12 - Janis Babson (born 1950)
- May 14 – Albert Sévigny, politician (born 1881)
- May 28 – Frank Boyes, politician (born 1874)
- May 29 – Gilbert Layton, businessman and politician (born 1899)
- May 31 – Walter Little, politician (born 1877)
- June 6 – William Anderson, politician and businessman (born 1905)
- June 19 – Richard Turner, soldier and recipient of the Victoria Cross (born 1871)

=== July to December ===
- July 12 – Mazo de la Roche, author (born 1879)
- July 15 – John Edward Brownlee, politician and 5th Premier of Alberta (born 1884)
- September 12 – Joseph-Arthur Bradette, politician (born 1886)
- September 16 – Percy Chapman Black, politician (born 1878)
- September 21 – William Duncan Herridge, politician and diplomat (born 1888)
- September 30 - Onésime Gagnon, politician and the 20th Lieutenant Governor of Quebec (born 1888)
- October 15 – Peter Dickinson, architect (born 1925)
- October 22 – Harry Nixon, politician and 13th Premier of Ontario (born 1891)

=== Full date unknown ===
- Anne Wilkinson, poet (born 1910)

== See also ==
- 1961 in Canadian television
- List of Canadian films
