= 1885 in Canada =

- Decades: 1860s; 1870s; 1880s; 1890s; 1900s
- See also: History of Canada; Timeline of Canadian history; List of years in Canada

Events from the year 1885 in Canada.

== Incumbents ==
=== Crown ===
- Monarch – Victoria

=== Federal government ===
- Governor General – Henry Petty-Fitzmaurice
- Prime Minister – John A. Macdonald
- Chief Justice – William Johnstone Ritchie (New Brunswick)
- Parliament – 5th

=== Provincial governments ===
==== Lieutenant governors ====
- Lieutenant Governor of British Columbia – Clement Francis Cornwall
- Lieutenant Governor of Manitoba – James Cox Aikins
- Lieutenant Governor of New Brunswick – Robert Duncan Wilmot (until November 11) then Samuel Leonard Tilley
- Lieutenant Governor of Nova Scotia – Matthew Henry Richey
- Lieutenant Governor of Ontario – John Beverley Robinson
- Lieutenant Governor of Prince Edward Island – Andrew Archibald Macdonald
- Lieutenant Governor of Quebec – Louis-Rodrigue Masson

==== Premiers ====
- Premier of British Columbia – William Smithe
- Premier of Manitoba – John Norquay
- Premier of New Brunswick – Andrew George Blair
- Premier of Nova Scotia – William Stevens Fielding
- Premier of Ontario – Oliver Mowat
- Premier of Prince Edward Island – William Wilfred Sullivan
- Premier of Quebec – John Jones Ross

=== Territorial governments ===
==== Lieutenant governors ====
- Lieutenant Governor of Keewatin – James Cox Aikins
- Lieutenant Governor of the North-West Territories – Edgar Dewdney

== Events ==
- March 26 – Louis Riel and the Métis battle the North-West Mounted Police at Duck Lake
- March 30 – North-West Rebellion: The Looting of Battleford begins. It will continue until April 24 when the Militia reach the town.
- April 2 – North-West Rebellion: In the Frog Lake Massacre, Cree warriors kill nine settler civilians and take 70 captive
- April 24 – North-West Rebellion: Battle of Fish Creek fought between Canadian Militia and the Métis
- May 2 – North-West Rebellion: Battle of Cut Knife
- May 9–12 – North-West Rebellion: Battle of Batoche the Métis are defeated in battle
- May 15 – Riel surrenders near Batoche, District of Saskatchewan, and is arrested
- May 28 – North-West Rebellion: Battle of Frenchman's Butte
- June 3 – North-West Rebellion: Battle of Loon Lake. The last Cree resistance is shattered.
- July 2 – Big Bear captured.
- July 6 – Riel is charged with six counts of high treason.
- July 20 – The trial of Louis Riel begins in Regina, District of Assiniboia
- July 20 – The Chinese Immigration Act of 1885 was enacted. The act imposed a $50 head tax on Chinese immigrants, with the exceptions of diplomats, government representatives, tourists, merchants, "men of science", and students. The act came after a big wave of Chinese immigrants going to Canada.
- August 1 – Riel is found guilty and sentenced to death
- September 9 – The Manitoba Court of Queen's Bench dismisses Riel's appeal
- September 15 – Northwest Territories election
- October 22 – The Judicial Committee of the Privy Council refuses to hear Riel's appeal
- October 31 – Newfoundland election: Robert Thorburn's Reforms win a majority
- November 7 – The Last Spike of the Canadian Pacific Railway at Craigellachie, British Columbia. John A. Macdonald receives a telegram announcing that the first train from Montreal in Quebec is approaching the Pacific.
- November 16 – Riel is hanged in Regina.
- November 27 – Hangings at Battleford: Wandering Spirit, Round the Sky, Bad Arrow, Miserable Man, Iron Body, Little Bear, Crooked Leg and Man Without Blood are hanged for murders committed during the Frog Lake Massacre and the Looting of Battleford. It is the largest mass execution in Canadian history.

=== Full date unknown ===
- Banff Hot Springs Reserve is established. It will be renamed Rocky Mountains Park in 1887 – the first national park in Canada – and then Banff National Park in 1930.
- Canada outlaws the potlatch ceremony among Northwest Coast tribes. The law, often ignored, is repealed in 1951.

== Births ==
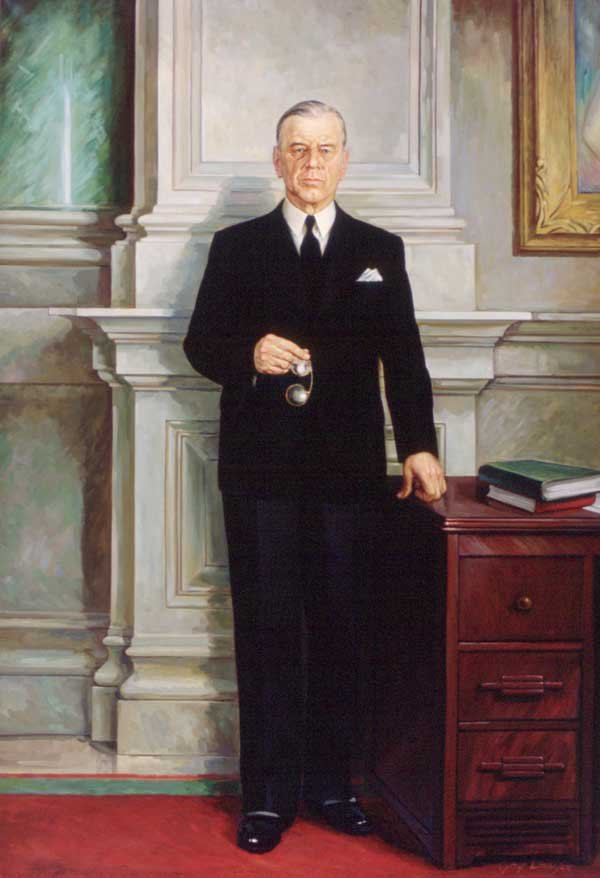
Gordon Daniel Conant

=== January to June ===
- January 11 – Gordon Daniel Conant, lawyer, politician and 12th Premier of Ontario (d.1953)
- January 13 – Alfred Fuller, businessman (d.1973)
- February 4 – Cairine Wilson, Canada's first female Senator (d.1962)
- April 3 – Allan Dwan, film director, producer and screenwriter (d.1981)
- April 9 – Frank Patrick O'Connor, businessman, politician and philanthropist (d. 1939)
- May 8 – Thomas B. Costain, journalist and historical novelist (d.1965)
- June 27 – Arthur Lismer, painter and member of the Group of Seven (d.1969)

=== July to December ===
- July 23 – Izaak Walton Killam, financier (d.1955)
- July 31 – Charles Avery Dunning, politician, Minister and university chancellor (d.1958)
- October 23 – Lawren Harris, Group of Seven painter (d.1970)
- November 5 – Edgar Sydney Little, politician (d.1943)
- December 5 – Ernest Cormier, engineer and architect (d.1980)
- December 24 – Abraham Albert Heaps, politician and labor leader (d.1954)

== Deaths ==
- January 13 – Gilbert Anselme Girouard, politician (b.1846)
- February 23 – Joseph-Édouard Cauchon, politician (b.1816)
- April 8 – Susanna Moodie, writer (b.1803)
- May 8 – James Colledge Pope, politician and 5th Premier of Prince Edward Island (b.1826)
- June 8 – Ignace Bourget, bishop of the Diocese of Montreal (b.1799)
- July 17 – Jean-Charles Chapais, politician (b.1811)
- August 18 – Francis Hincks, politician (b.1807)
- November 5 – David Anderson, Church of England priest and bishop of Rupert's Land (b.1814)
- November 16 – Louis Riel, politician and Métis leader (b.1844)
