= Olivier Perrault =

Canadian politician (1773–1827)

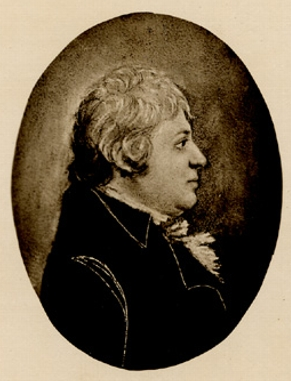
Olivier Perrault

Olivier Perrault (July 21, 1773 – March 19, 1827) was a seigneur, lawyer, judge and political figure in Lower Canada. He was also sometimes known as Jean-Baptiste-Olivier Perrault.

He was born Jean-Olivier Perrault at Quebec City in 1773, the son of Jacques Perrault, and studied at the Petit Séminaire de Québec. He articled in law and qualified to practise in 1799. In 1804, he married Marie-Louise, the daughter of seigneur Gabriel-Elzéar Taschereau. He was named clerk of the land roll and inspector general of the royal domain in 1808, but resigned to allow Joseph-Bernard Planté to be named to these posts. He was named advocate general of Lower Canada later that year. In 1812, he was named an honorary member of the Executive Council. He served as lieutenant-colonel in the militia. In 1812, Perrault was named judge in the Court of King's Bench for Quebec district. He was named to the Legislative Council in 1818 and was speaker from 1823 to 1827. Perrault owned the seigneury of Sainte-Marie.

He died at Quebec City while still in office in 1827.

His brother Jacques-Nicolas served in the legislative assembly and legislative council. His daughter Julie married Elzéar-Henri Juchereau Duchesnay.
