= 1874 in Canada =

- Decades: 1850s; 1860s; 1870s; 1880s; 1890s
- See also: History of Canada; Timeline of Canadian history; List of years in Canada

Events from the year 1874 in Canada.

== Incumbents ==
=== Crown ===
- Monarch – Victoria

=== Federal government ===
- Governor General – Frederick Hamilton-Temple-Blackwood
- Prime Minister – Alexander Mackenzie
- Parliament – 2nd (until 2 January) then 3rd (from 26 March)

=== Provincial governments ===
==== Lieutenant governors ====
- Lieutenant Governor of British Columbia – Joseph Trutch
- Lieutenant Governor of Manitoba – Alexander Morris
- Lieutenant Governor of New Brunswick – Samuel Leonard Tilley
- Lieutenant Governor of Nova Scotia – Adams George Archibald
- Lieutenant Governor of Ontario – John Willoughby Crawford
- Lieutenant Governor of Prince Edward Island – William Cleaver Francis Robinson (until July 4) then Robert Hodgson
- Lieutenant Governor of Quebec – René-Édouard Caron

==== Premiers ====
- Premier of British Columbia – Amor De Cosmos (until February 11) then George Anthony Walkem
- Premier of Manitoba – Henry Joseph Clarke (until July 8) then Marc-Amable Girard (July 8 to December 3) then Robert Atkinson Davis
- Premier of New Brunswick – George Edwin King
- Premier of Nova Scotia – William Annand
- Premier of Ontario – Oliver Mowat
- Premier of Prince Edward Island – Lemuel Cambridge Owen
- Premier of Quebec – Gédéon Ouimet (until September 22) then Charles Boucher de Boucherville

=== Territorial governments ===
==== Lieutenant governors ====
- Lieutenant Governor of the Northwest Territories – Alexander Morris

== Events ==
- January 22 – Federal election: Alexander Mackenzie's Liberals win a majority, defeating J. A. Macdonald's Liberal-Conservatives
- February 11 – George Walkem becomes premier of British Columbia, replacing Amor De Cosmos
- April 16 – Louis Riel is barred from taking his seat in the House of Commons.
- May 29 – The Liberals introduce electoral reform that introduces the secret ballot and abolishes property qualifications
- June–July - New Brunswick election
- July 8 - Marc-Amable Girard becomes premier of Manitoba for the second time, replacing Henry Joseph Clarke. Manitoba institutes responsible government, adopting the convention that the lieutenant governor acts on the advice of the premier and no longer takes an active role in directing the government.
- July 26 - Alexander Graham Bell discloses the invention of the telephone to his father at the family home on the outskirts of Brantford, Ontario.
- September 22 – Sir Charles-Eugène de Boucherville becomes premier of Quebec, replacing Gédéon Ouimet
- October 1 – The North-West Mounted Police base at Fort Macleod is founded
- December 3 – Robert Davis becomes premier of Manitoba, replacing Marc-Amable Girard.
- December 17 – Nova Scotia election: Philip Carteret Hill's Liberals win a second consecutive majority
- December 30 – Manitoba election

=== Full date unknown ===
- Anabaptists (Russian Mennonites) start to arrive in Manitoba from various Russian colonies arriving in Canada in August.
- The federal Liberal government grants provisional boundaries to Ontario that extend the province to the north and west. These provisional boundaries will not be recognized by the federal Conservatives when they return to power.
- Newfoundland election

== Births ==
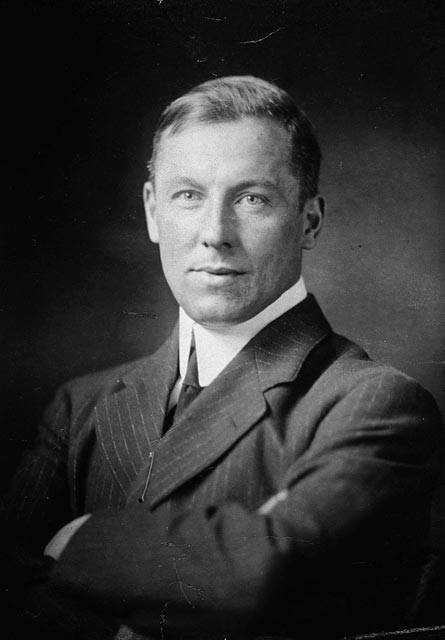
Robert W. Service, c.1905

=== January to June ===
- January 15 – James David Stewart, educator, lawyer, politician and Premier of Prince Edward Island (d.1933)
- January 16 – Robert W. Service, poet and writer (d.1958)
- January 29 – Frank Boyes, politician (d.1961)
- February 10 – Walter Lea, politician and Premier of Prince Edward Island (d.1936)
- April 14 – Alexander Cambridge, 1st Earl of Athlone, 16th Governor General of Canada (d.1957)
- June 16 – Arthur Meighen, politician and 9th Prime Minister of Canada (d.1960)

=== July to December ===
- July 13 – Norman Dawes, businessman
- July 29 – J. S. Woodsworth, politician (d.1942)
- October 1 – Arthur Sauvé, politician (d.1944)
- October 10 – Roland Fairbairn McWilliams, politician and Lieutenant-Governor of Manitoba (d.1957)
- October 12 – Albert Charles Saunders, jurist, politician and Premier of Prince Edward Island (d.1943)

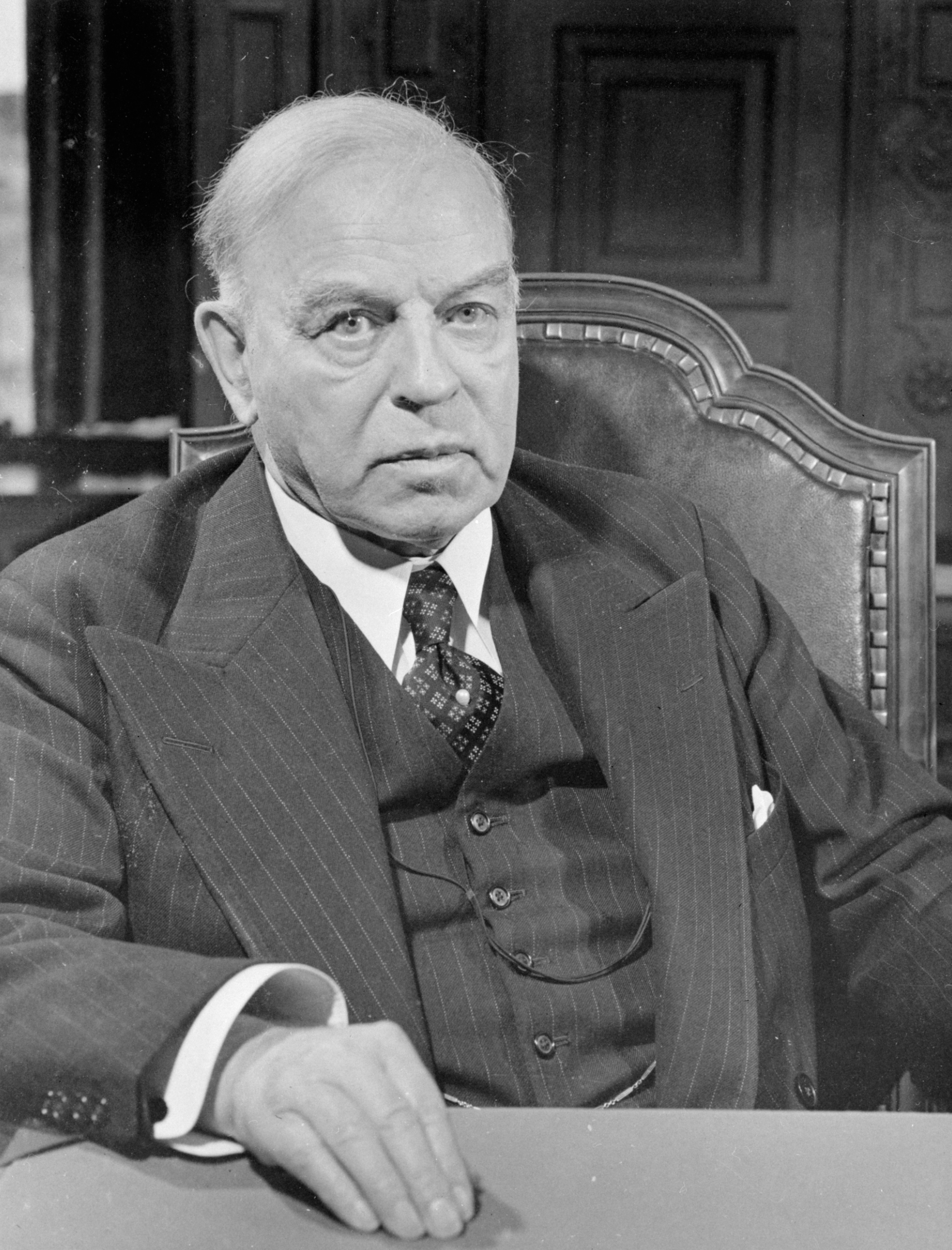
William Lyon Mackenzie King

- October 25 – Philémon Cousineau, politician (d.1959)
- November 30 – Lucy Maud Montgomery, author (d.1942)
- December 17 – William Lyon Mackenzie King, lawyer, economist, university professor, civil servant, journalist, politician and 10th Prime Minister of Canada (d.1950)

== Deaths ==
- February 8 – Joseph-Bruno Guigues, first bishop of the diocese of Bytown (Ottawa) (b.1805)
- March 9 – Joseph Casavant, manufacturer of pipe organs (b.1807)
- June 18 – Edwin Atwater, businessperson and municipal politician (b.1808)
- August 3 – Charles Laberge, lawyer, journalist and politician (b.1827)
- December 17 – Hiram Blanchard, Premier of Nova Scotia (b.1820)
- December 22 – Étienne Parent, journalist (b.1802)
