= 1884 in Canada =

- Decades: 1860s; 1870s; 1880s; 1890s; 1900s
- See also: History of Canada; Timeline of Canadian history; List of years in Canada

Events from the year 1884 in Canada.

== Incumbents ==
=== Crown ===
- Monarch – Victoria

=== Federal government ===
- Governor General – Henry Petty-Fitzmaurice
- Prime Minister – John A. Macdonald
- Chief Justice – William Johnstone Ritchie (New Brunswick)
- Parliament – 5th

=== Provincial governments ===
==== Lieutenant governors ====
- Lieutenant Governor of British Columbia – Clement Francis Cornwall
- Lieutenant Governor of Manitoba – James Cox Aikins
- Lieutenant Governor of New Brunswick – Robert Duncan Wilmot
- Lieutenant Governor of Nova Scotia – Matthew Henry Richey
- Lieutenant Governor of Ontario – John Beverley Robinson
- Lieutenant Governor of Prince Edward Island – Thomas H. Haviland (until July 18) then Andrew Archibald Macdonald
- Lieutenant Governor of Quebec – Théodore Robitaille (until October 4) then Louis-Rodrigue Masson

==== Premiers ====
- Premier of British Columbia – William Smithe
- Premier of Manitoba – John Norquay
- Premier of New Brunswick – Andrew George Blair
- Premier of Nova Scotia – William Thomas Pipes (until July 15) then William Stevens Fielding (from July 28)
- Premier of Ontario – Oliver Mowat
- Premier of Prince Edward Island – William Wilfred Sullivan
- Premier of Quebec – Joseph-Alfred Mousseau (until January 23) then John Jones Ross

=== Territorial governments ===
==== Lieutenant governors ====
- Lieutenant Governor of Keewatin – James Cox Aikins
- Lieutenant Governor of the North-West Territories – Edgar Dewdney

== Events ==
- January 2 – "Humber Railway Disaster" 32 men and boys were killed upon the head-on collision of a Grand Trunk Railway commuter train with an unscheduled freight train No. 42C near Toronto. Most of the dead were workers being transported on the freight train to the Ontario Bolt Works in Swansea, Ontario.
- January 10 – David Scott elected as the first mayor of Regina
- January 17 – The Parliament Building's new electric lights were turned on, for the first time.
- January 23 – John Jones Ross becomes premier of Quebec, replacing Joseph-Alfred Mousseau.
- June 22 – The seven surviving members of the 25-man Lady Franklin Bay Expedition, led by Adolphus Greely, are rescued by Winfield Scott Schley. One more died on the homeward journey.
- July 28 – William Fielding becomes premier of Nova Scotia, replacing William Pipes.
- September 15 – The Nile Voyageurs depart for Africa
- October 15 – The La Presse newspaper is founded
- November 7 – Calgary is incorporated as a town, changing its name from Fort Calgary
- Parliament of Canada passes the Indian Advancement Act, encouraging democratic elections of chiefs. Mohawks at St. Regis, Ontario, resist the provision, preferring their traditional method of choosing leaders.

== Births ==
=== January to June ===
- February 10 – Rork Scott Ferguson, politician (d.unknown)
- February 18 – Andrew Watson Myles, politician (d.1970)
- April 6 – Walter Huston, actor (d.1950)
- April 12 – Maurice Brasset, politician and lawyer (d.1971)
- April 30 – Murdoch Mackay, politician (d.1963)
- May 1 – Henry Norwest, sniper in World War I (d.1918)
- June 11 – William George Bock, politician (d.1973)

=== July to December ===
- July 25 – Davidson Black, paleoanthropologist (d.1934)
- August 27 – John Edward Brownlee, politician and 5th Premier of Alberta (d.1961)
- September 2 – Angus MacInnis, politician (d.1964)
- September 27 – Silby Barrett, labour leader
- December 15 – James Macdonnell, soldier, lawyer and politician (d.1973)

== Deaths ==
- January 14 – Pierre-Eustache Dostaler, farmer and politician (b.1809)
- January 31 – Charles Dewey Day, lawyer, judge and politician (b.1806)
- February 20 – Abram William Lauder, lawyer and politician (b.1834)

=== Full date unknown ===
- John Ferris, businessman, explorer and politician (b.1811)
