= 1877 in Canada =

- Decades: 1850s; 1860s; 1870s; 1880s; 1890s
- See also: History of Canada; Timeline of Canadian history; List of years in Canada

Events from the year 1877 in Canada.

== Incumbents ==
=== Crown ===
- Monarch – Victoria

=== Federal government ===
- Governor General – Frederick Hamilton-Temple-Blackwood
- Prime Minister – Alexander Mackenzie
- Chief Justice – William Buell Richards (Ontario)
- Parliament – 3rd

=== Provincial governments ===
==== Lieutenant governors ====
- Lieutenant Governor of British Columbia – Albert Norton Richards
- Lieutenant Governor of Manitoba – Alexander Morris (until October 8) then Joseph-Édouard Cauchon
- Lieutenant Governor of New Brunswick – Samuel Leonard Tilley
- Lieutenant Governor of the North-West Territories – David Laird
- Lieutenant Governor of Nova Scotia – Adams George Archibald
- Lieutenant Governor of Ontario – Donald Alexander Macdonald
- Lieutenant Governor of Prince Edward Island – Robert Hodgson
- Lieutenant Governor of Quebec – Luc Letellier de St-Just

==== Premiers ====
- Premier of British Columbia – Andrew Charles Elliott
- Premier of Manitoba – Robert Atkinson Davis
- Premier of New Brunswick – George Edwin King
- Premier of Nova Scotia – Philip Carteret Hill
- Premier of Ontario – Oliver Mowat
- Premier of Prince Edward Island – Louis Henry Davies
- Premier of Quebec – Charles Boucher de Boucherville

=== Territorial governments ===
==== Lieutenant governors ====
- Lieutenant Governor of Keewatin – Alexander Morris (until October 8) then Joseph-Édouard Cauchon
- Lieutenant Governor of the Northwest Territories – David Laird

== Events ==
- February 28 – University of Manitoba founded.
- June 20 – The Great Fire of Saint John, New Brunswick had destroyed over 80 hectares (200 acres) and 1,612 structures including eight churches, six banks, fourteen hotels, eleven schooners and four wood boats.
- September 22 – Treaty 7 signed.

=== Full date unknown ===
- Charles Alphonse Pantaléon Pelletier appointed Minister of Agriculture and called to the Senate of Canada
- Manzo Nagano was the first official Japanese immigrant into Canada
- Refugee Lakota enter Canada near the end of the Great Sioux War
- Sir Wilfrid Laurier is appointed Canadian Minister of Inland Revenue
- The provincial legislature creates the University of Manitoba, the oldest University in western Canada.

== Births ==
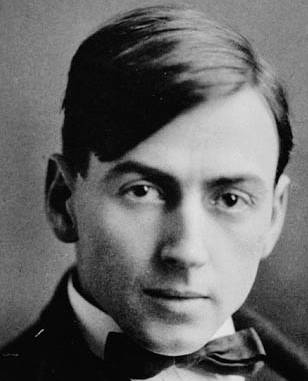
Tom Thomson

- January 5 – Edgar Nelson Rhodes, politician, Minister and Premier of Nova Scotia (died 1942)
- March 25 – Walter Little, politician (died 1961)
- May 23 – Fred Wellington Bowen, politician (died 1949)
- July 23 – Aimé Boucher, politician and notary (died 1946)
- August 5 – Tom Thomson, artist (died 1917)
- August 29 – George Arthur Brethen, politician (died 1968)
- October 16 – H. H. Couzens, electrical engineer (died 1944)
- November 19 – John Alexander Macdonald Armstrong, politician (died 1926)
- December 15 – John Thomas Haig, politician (died 1962)
- December 18 – James Allison Glen, politician, Minister and Speaker of the House of Commons of Canada (died 1950)
- December 26 – Aldéric-Joseph Benoit, politician (died 1968)

== Deaths ==
- January 2 – Jonathan McCully, politician (born 1809)
- May 4 – Charles Wilson, politician (born 1808)
- July 12 – Amand Landry, farmer and politician (born 1805)
- November 3 – William Henry Draper, politician, lawyer, and judge (born 1801)
- November 7 – Joseph-Octave Beaubien, physician and politician (born 1825)
- November 8 – John Cook, politician Ontarian (born 1791)

== Historical documents ==
"Great irregularities" - House of Commons committee finds inefficiency, lethargy and political influence rife in federal civil service

U.S. government report on commerce in the Province of Ontario

Archbishop Taché backs denominational schools in Manitoba

Editorial on the continual exodus of Quebeckers to the U.S.A.

Information pamphlet on a British agricultural colonization scheme for Western Canada

Lecturer says the rights and equality of women are necessary to society

Sitting Bull rejects the offer of a pardon and return to the U.S.A.
