= Imprisonment for debt (Upper Canada) =

A series of parliamentary reports describe the scope of the problem of debt in Upper Canada; as early as 1827, the eleven district jails in the province had a capacity of 298 cells, of which 264 were occupied, 159 by debtors. In the Home District, 379 of 943 prisoners between 1833 and 1835 were being held for debt. Over the province as a whole, 48% or 2304 of 4726 prisoners were being held in jail for debt in 1836. The number of debtors jailed was the result of both widespread poverty, and the small amounts for which debtors could be indefinitely detained.

== The economy of debt ==
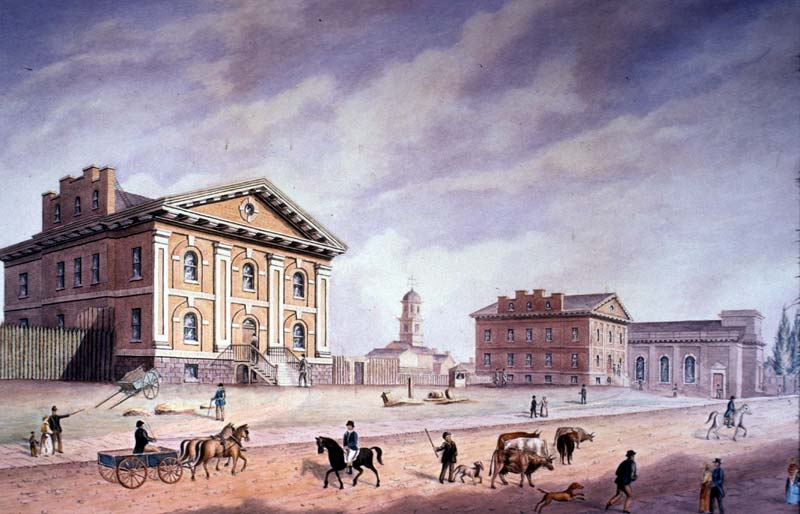
Toronto Jail (left), 1835, with fence around the exercise yard

The greater portion of British emigrants, arriving in Canada without funds and the most exalted ideas of the value and productiveness of land, purchase extensively on credit... Everything goes on well for a short time. A log-house is erected with the assistance of old settlers, and the clearing of forest is commenced. Credit is obtained at a neighbouring store... During this period he has led a life of toil and privation... On the arrival of the fourth harvest, he is reminded by the storekeeper to pay his account with cash, or discharge part of it with his disposable produce, for which he gets a very small price. He is also informed that the purchase money of the land has been accumulating with interest... he finds himself poorer than when he commenced operation. Disappointment preys on his spirit... the land ultimately reverts to the former proprietor, or a new purchaser is found.

— Patrick Shirreff, 1835

Upper Canada was a cash-poor province without its own currency. As a result, the economy of the province was based upon credit-debt relationships. To be in debt was to be in danger of indefinite imprisonment. The only protection was a reputation for being able to pay those debts - "respectability" indicated a person's credit-worthiness.

=== Respectability ===
Respectability encompassed both economic and political dimensions, and was not simply an expression of ‘middle class values.’ At an economic level, it signified someone with a "competence", a secure source of income without the need to resort to charity. The economic independence signified by respectability was expressed politically also, as each farmer, each "freeholder", was therefore entitled to a vote. Merchants could demand votes for their candidate, and effectively monitor their clients’ compliance, since voting was open at the hustings. Universal suffrage was denied and property qualifications to vote imposed precisely because, it was argued, only a man of property had the independence to vote according to his conscience; women, as dependents upon their husbands, were denied the vote for the same reason.

=== The Truck system ===
In truck systems, apparently "independent" farmers were reduced to dependent status through debt. They were forced to accept payment for their crops at lower prices and to accept payment in kind with store goods at inflated prices. The truck system was found widely in Britain, the Caribbean, Newfoundland and Australia in the same period. Lt. Governor John Graves Simcoe had recognized this fact in Upper Canada as early as 1792: "At present the Farmer has no other means of obtaining such necessaries as he may want, but by bartering the produce of his Land for them with the petty Merchant, who by this means sets his own price on both commodities…" The struggle between merchant and farmer was thus one for independence; for farmers in particular, from those debts which allowed merchants to demand sole rights to surpluses, and to dictate the price paid for that surplus. Historian Donald Creighton attributed the Rebellions of 1837 to this tension. Merchants would extend credit to new farmers, but after a few years would start demanding payment of the debt in wheat - and with a captive market, they would set the price. They would have the farmer sign a promissory note for the balance, which meant that the merchant could sue the farmer at any time, and indefinitely imprison him until the debt was paid. It was to the merchant's advantage to keep the farmer producing as much as possible for as long as possible, and to pay as little as possible for it. The threat of the lawsuit was the most powerful weapon he had to do so.

== Laws for the recovery of debt ==
Our situation is in some respects more appalling than a Criminal imprisoned for murder, he is allowed a straw bed, blankets, bread and fuel, and knows the termination of his imprisonment, we poor wretches are imprisoned, for a debt maybe of two pounds, and from four to seven pounds cost… we have not so much as a bench to sit on, a shelf or cupboard to place a loaf of bread upon, not even a straw bed to lay on, no blanket to cover us, no fire to warm us.

— John Woolstencroft, a debtor in the York Gaol, 1831

Any two justices meeting together could form the lowest level of the justice system, the Courts of Request, which could settle cases up to £2. A Court of Quarter Sessions was held four times a year in each district composed of all the resident justices. The Quarter Sessions met to oversee the administration of the district and deal with legal cases up to £20. These justices were frequently merchants. The court could order that the debtor's property be seized and sold at a sheriff's auction to pay the debt.

The losing debtor was also liable for the court costs which frequently exceeded the inconsequential debt itself. Woolstencroft provided a list of 6 debtors then in the York jail whose court costs exceeded their debt. It is this issue which first drove William Lyon Mackenzie into politics, and formed the basis for his lifelong vendetta against the province’s solicitor general, Henry J. Boulton. People like Robert Randal and Henry Ausman, discussed below, could find their property sold at a Sheriff’s auction far below its value, to pay the legal fees of lawyers like Henry J. Boulton, who then turned around and purchased that property at discounted prices with the very money he had recouped. Mackenzie’s political career as the representative for the Second Riding of York was said to have been inspired by the case of Robert Randal who had been jailed by Boulton.

If the returns from the Sheriff's sale were inadequate, or the debtor refused to reveal the location of their property, or if there was fear that the debtor might seek to flee, the creditor could have the debtor imprisoned indefinitely.

=== Indefinite Imprisonment ===
The biggest difference between England and Upper Canada was that there was no separate jail for debtors in Upper Canada, leading to much worse conditions for jailed debtors. Insolvency laws were designed to protect creditors. An 1805 law made it possible for jailed debtors to apply to the court for support in jail, and the creditor would be liable to pay 5 shillings a week to feed them. The prisoner was otherwise without food, heat or clothing. The creditor did not have to pay if they could show the debtor had hidden their assets.

An 1822 law allowed debtors freedom to roam a six-acre plot of the city (known as being 'on the liberty') if someone would post a bond on their behalf. This allowed them to work within those constrained limits and earn the money for their freedom. Reform politician John Rolph introduced a bill to abolish imprisonment for debt in 1829 but it was defeated by the Family Compact. The laws remained basically unchanged into the 1850s. The only alteration was in 1836, when the indefinite imprisonment until the debt was paid was reduced. A prisoner could appeal for release after 3 months for debts below £20; after 6 months for debts between £20 and £100; and after a year for debts greater than £100. They still remained liable for the debt.

== Key cases of abuse of the laws ==
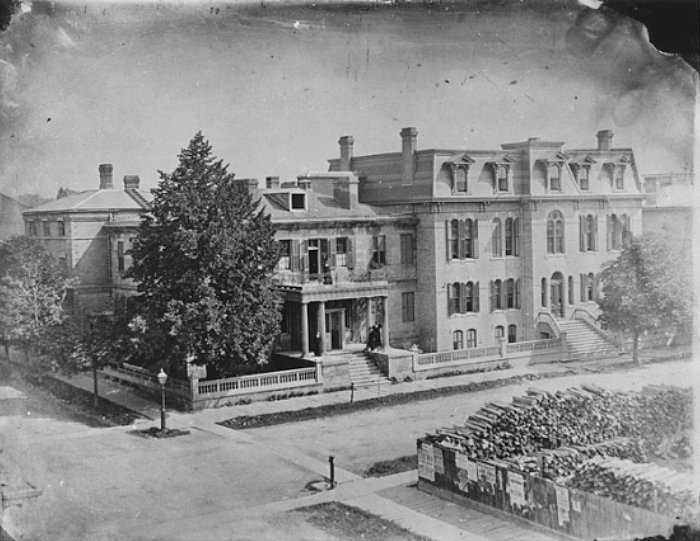
The Bank of Upper Canada Building in 1872 (Adelaide Street, Toronto)

The Reform movement consistently sought to repeal the draconian laws for the collection of debt, and used a number of high-profile cases to illustrate the problems. The two main examples involve the Attorney General, Henry J. Boulton, and reflect strategies pursued by those who controlled the Upper Canadian legal system and the judiciary. The reformers argued that an expansion of the credit system (which excluded farmers since land couldn't be used as collateral for a bank loan) would ensure repayment of debts and allow farmers to retain their property. The Farmers' Storehouse Company was one means by which they did so. William Lyon Mackenzie publicized the case of Henry Ausman to demonstrate how the Bank of Upper Canada could ruin 20 years of a farmer's life in 90 days.

=== Robert Randal ===
Randal's case is an example of how the Family Compact used their wealth and positions to eliminate economic and political competitors using the laws for the recovery of debt. Randal was an entrepreneur and politician who had acquired a share in two properties, one at Niagara Falls, the other in the Ottawa valley. In debt to Montreal merchants, he was jailed in 1809, where he remained for six-and-a-half years. Randal had hired D’Arcy Boulton Sr., Attorney General at the time, to defend his property rights in the Court of King’s Bench. When Boulton senior was named to the bench in 1818, Henry John Boulton, his son, took over Randal’s case. Henry John demanded an IOU for £25 and a mortgage for the £100 in legal fees owed his father and himself. Only then did he go to court, a court presided over by his father. The elder Boulton refused to hear the case due to his prior involvement, and delayed the trial another year. Henry John, the Solicitor General, claimed he did not know that his father would refuse to hear the case. Before Randal’s case came to trial in 1819, his IOU to Boulton came due and when he could not pay it, Boulton sued him and obtained judgment, all without his knowledge. Randal's Ottawa property was auctioned at a sheriff’s sale for £449 - more than his debt, but far less than the property’s value. The property was purchased by Levius Sherwood, a partner of Henry John Boulton (and the brother-in-law to his wife, Eliza Jones), and later replacement of Boulton Sr. as judge in the Court of King’s Bench. Boulton excused his behavior in suing his own client by stating he knew other creditors were about to do the same, and he wanted to be first in line to stake a claim. Randal’s persecution made him a popular hero, and he was elected to the House of Assembly in 1820 for the Fourth Riding of Lincoln. When he sought re-election in 1824, he had to swear he met the property qualification; he named the properties of which he had been robbed. John B. Robinson, the Attorney General (and H. J. Boulton’s brother-in-law), indicted Randal for perjury as a means of disqualifying his election.

=== Henry Ausman ===
Henry Ausman was a Hanoverian German who moved to Markham in 1802. He leased lot ten on the fourth concession of Markham, a crown reserve lot, seven years later. In 1830, his 21 year lease came due, but he was in arrears on his rent. He borrowed £25 from the Bank of Upper Canada on a 90-day loan (the standard for the period) to finish a sawmill. He was able to renew his lease, but unable to repay the loan, having an outstanding balance of £21 3s. The Bank sued him, an action he did not contest. However, Henry J. Boulton, the Bank's lawyer, sued both him and his co-signer, and sued both in the highest court with the highest court fees. In the standard course of such a claim, the court would render a verdict in favour of the Bank, assess court costs, and authorize the sheriff to seize property for public auction to pay the debt. Ausman’s original unpaid debt was for £21; with legal fees, it rose to £41. In the end, the sheriff auctioned off £100 of farm animals and equipment to pay the judgement. As Ausman pointed out, the interest on the £21 for a year would have amounted to only a little more than £1 but the Bank refused to renew his 90-day loan. William Lyon Mackenzie publicized Ausman’s case in his newspaper because it represented the normal course of affairs. Relatively small debts loaned for very short periods by the Bank could impoverish and bankrupt a farmer who had worked 21 years to build up his farm. Once sued, other creditors quickly followed suit while Ausman still had property left to seize; his "respectability" or credit worthiness was challenged. A parliamentary report showed that in 1830, the Home District Court recorded 156 successful actions for an average debt of £21. That represents a large proportion of the new farmers of the district, many of whom were forced to abandon their farms as a result.

== See also ==
- Debt: The First 5000 Years
