= Jacques-Nicolas Perrault =

Canadian politician (1750–1812)

Jacques-Nicolas Perrault (August 6, 1750 – August 7, 1812) was a seigneur, businessman and political figure in Lower Canada.

He was born in Quebec City in 1750, the son of Jacques Perrault and grandson of Pierre Boucher de Boucherville. He entered his father's business and continued in business after his father died in 1775. Like his father, Perrault later referred to himself as Perrault l'aîné. In 1779, he married Marie-Anne, the daughter of merchant Jean-Baptiste Amiot; she died in 1782. Like other businesspeople of the time, he lobbied for a representative assembly for the province. Perrault was a captain in the local militia and a justice of the peace. He received the seigneury of La Bouteillerie (or Rivière-Ouelle) from his uncle, gaining full ownership in 1792 when his mother died. In 1793, he settled at Rivière-Ouelle, where he had married Thérèse-Esther Hausman, the widow of a local merchant. With the aim of developing his seigneury, he purchased property which include a sawmill, barley mill and blacksmith's stop; he built a wharf and set up a sugar bush. He was named colonel in the local militia. Perrault was elected to represent Cornwallis in the Legislative Assembly of Lower Canada in 1804; he was named to the Legislative Council in 1812. While in the assembly, he supported legislation that banned judges from being members of the legislative assembly.

He was found dead in his bath at Rivière-Ouelle in 1812 after having been ill for several days.

His brother Olivier was a judge and also served in the legislative council.
