= William Sturge Moore =

Canadian politician

William Sturge Moore (before 1785 – 1809 or later) was a political figure in Lower Canada. He represented Bedford in the Legislative Assembly of Lower Canada from 1805 to 1809.

He came to the seigneury of Foucault, also known as Caldwell's Manor, from Pennsylvania in November 1801. In 1805, he became a justice of the peace and, in 1807, was named a commissioner for the purpose of taking the oath from officers on half-pay, and also a judge for the district. Moore was elected to the assembly in an 1805 by-election; he did not run for reelection in 1809. He married Hetty Harper, probably his second wife, in New England.
