= Jacques Cartier (businessman) =

Canadian politician

Jacques Cartier (April 10, 1750 – March 22, 1814) was a businessman and political figure in Lower Canada.

He was born in the town of Quebec in 1750, the son of a Quebec merchant. He studied at Longue-Pointe (later Montreal) and became a merchant at Quebec. Around 1772, he moved to Saint-Antoine-sur-Richelieu, where he became a grain merchant. He served in the local militia during the American invasion of Quebec in 1775-6 and continued in the militia afterwards, becoming lieutenant-colonel in 1808. Cartier built a gristmill so he could produce flour. He also lent money, sometimes taking property as repayment. Cartier established a postal service in the Richelieu valley in 1800. He was elected to the Legislative Assembly of Lower Canada for Surrey in 1804 and was reelected in 1808.

He died in Saint-Antoine-sur-Richelieu in 1814.

His grandson, George-Étienne Cartier (son of Jacques Cartier), later served as a premier for the Province of Canada and was a Father of Confederation.
