= Rick Cluff =

Canadian journalist (1950–2024)

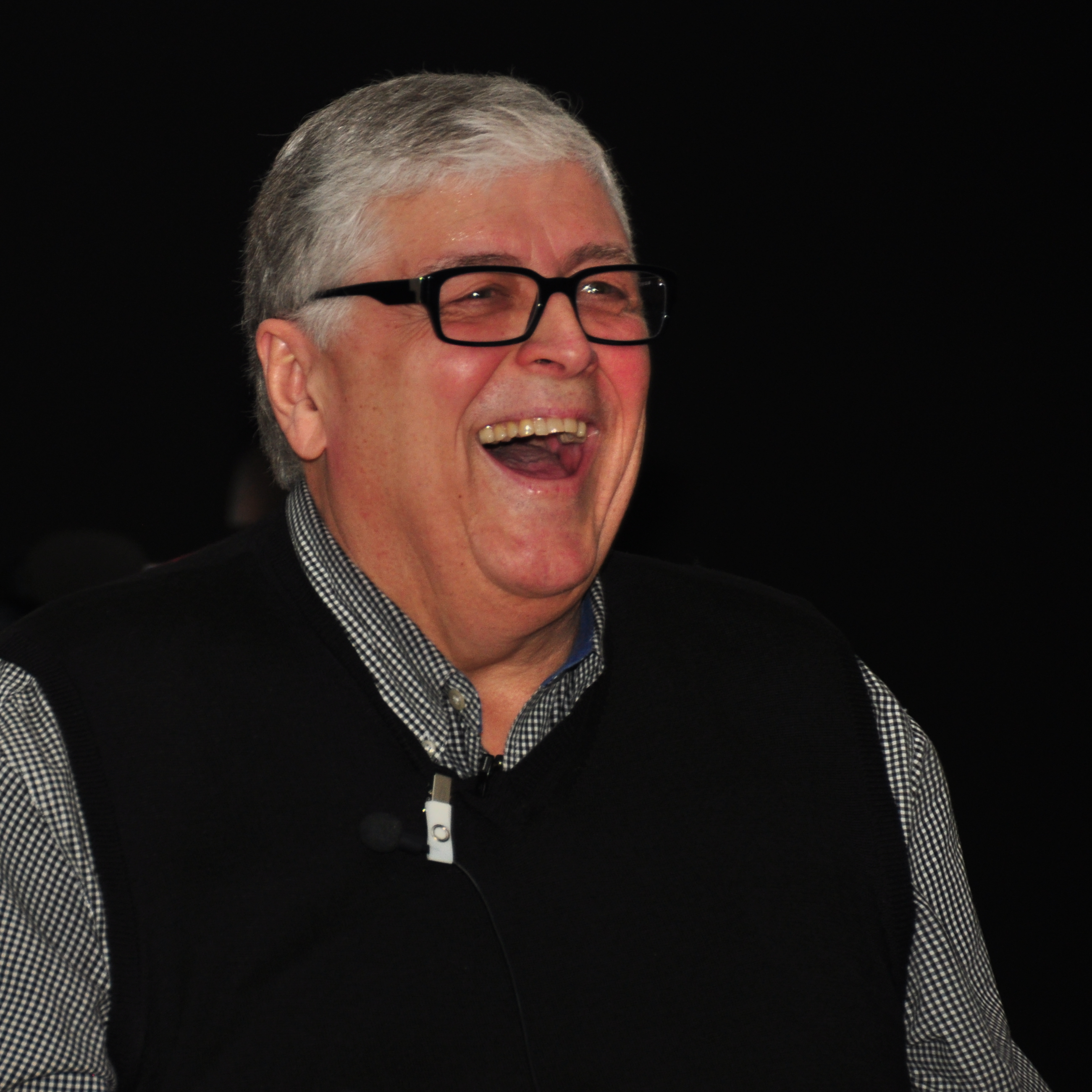
- Cluff in 2014
- Born: June 27, 1950; Toronto, Ontario, Canada
- Died: July 2, 2024 (aged 74)
- Education: Seneca College; University of Western Ontario
- Occupations: Journalist; radio host
- Years active: 1997–2018
- Known for: The Early Edition
- Children: 2

John Richard Cluff (June 27, 1950 – July 2, 2024) was a Canadian journalist who hosted the CBC Radio Vancouver morning program The Early Edition from 1997 until 2018. He was a member of the Canadian Football Hall of Fame and recipient of the Lifetime Achievement Award from the Canadian Radio Television Digital News Association.

== Early life and education ==
Cluff was born in Toronto, Ontario on June 27, 1950. His father was a former Air Force radio host, performer, and record producer in Toronto.

After being kicked out of school in grade 10, Cluff later attended college as a mature student. He attended Seneca College and the University of Western Ontario where he worked at the student radio stations. After attending graduate school, he earned a position with the CBC.

When Cluff began working at Seneca's student radio show, his father discouraged him from thinking of radio as a career. He was especially opposed to the CBC "because the CBC is full of left-wing communists. And radio is a dead-end career."

== Career ==
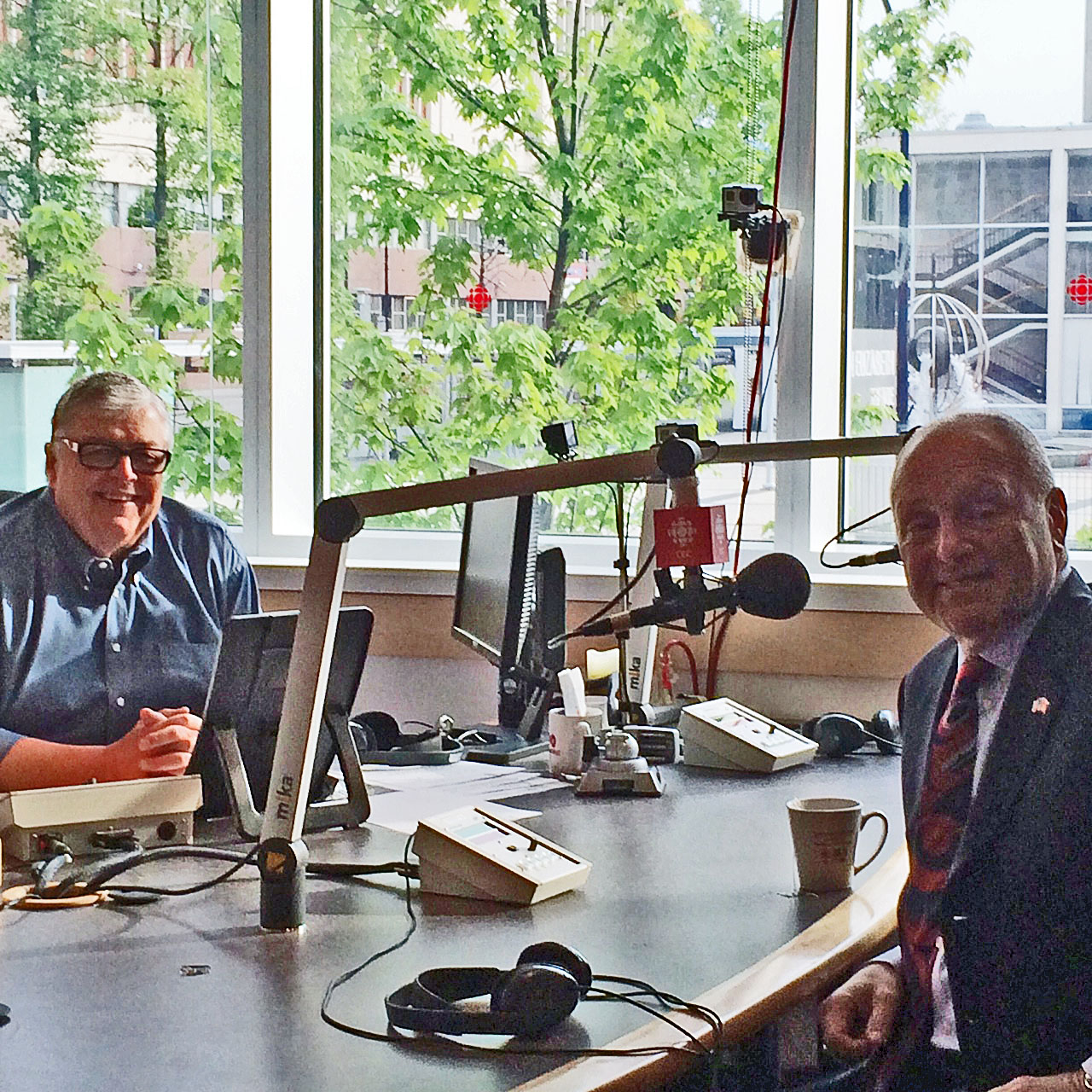
Rick Cluff (left) in 2014

Cluff began his career at CBC in 1976 as a radio journalist focusing on sports. As a sports journalist, he covered eight Olympic games and five Commonwealth games. Cluff was one of the few journalists allowed to enter Moscow and Prague during the World Hockey Championships at the time of the Cold War.

Cluff was sent as a reporter to the 1996 Summer Olympics in Atlanta, where he reported for two hours on the Centennial Olympic Park bombing with limited preparation. Upon his return, the vice presidents of CBC asked him if he would host his own show. He was later asked by Susan Englebert to take up a three-year position in Vancouver as host of The Early Edition, which was later extended.

Cluff began his 20-year career as host of The Early Edition in September 1997. In 1999, he was inducted into the Canadian Football Hall of Fame.

In June 2017, before announcing his retirement, Cluff underwent open-heart surgery after living with hereditary heart disease. In December 2017, it was announced that Stephen Quinn would replace Cluff. In 2018, he was the recipient of the Lifetime Achievement Award from the Canadian Radio Television Digital News Association.

== Personal life ==
Cluff and his wife had two children. He died from cancer on July 2, 2024, at the age of 74.
