= 1886 Prince Edward Island general election =

Canadian provincial election

The 1886 Prince Edward Island election was held on 30 June 1886 to elect members of the House of Assembly of the province of Prince Edward Island, Canada. It was won by the Conservative party.

Party	Leader	1882	Seats won	% change	Popular vote	(%)
Conservative	William Wilfred Sullivan	21	18	-14%		
Liberal		9	12	+33%		
Totals		30	30			
