= Joseph-Bernard Planté =

Canadian politician

Joseph-Bernard Planté (December 19, 1768 – February 13, 1826) was a notary and political figure in Lower Canada.

He was born in Pointe-aux-Trembles in 1768 and studied at the Petit Séminaire de Québec. He articled as a notary with Jean-Antoine Panet and then Olivier Perrault, qualified to practice in 1788 and set up practice at Quebec City. He was elected to the Legislative Assembly of Lower Canada for Hampshire in 1796 and was reelected in 1800 and 1804. In 1808, he was elected to represent Kent in the assembly. In 1801, he was named commissioner for the relief of the insane and foundlings. He was appointed clerk of the land roll in 1802 and inspector general of the royal domain in 1803. In 1808, Governor James Henry Craig removed those appointments because he took part in founding the newspaper Le Canadien. Planté was named a justice of the peace for Quebec district in 1810. He served in the local militia, becoming lieutenant-colonel in 1812. He was a director of the Union Company of Quebec which operated the Union Hotel. Planté also served as vice-president of the Quebec Fire Assurance Company and of the Quebec Savings Bank.

He died at Quebec City in 1826 and was buried at Sainte-Foy.
