= 1807 in Canada =

Events from the year 1807 in Canada.

== Incumbents ==
- Monarch: George III

=== Federal government ===
- Parliament of Lower Canada: 4th
- Parliament of Upper Canada: 4th

=== Governors ===
- Governor of the Canadas: Robert Milnes
- Governor of New Brunswick: Thomas Carleton
- Governor of Nova Scotia: John Wentworth
- Commodore-Governor of Newfoundland: John Holloway
- Governor of Prince Edward Island: Joseph Frederick Wallet DesBarres

== Events ==
- The slave trade is abolished in the British Empire, although slavery continues in the colonies.
- The Embargo Act aims at keeping US ships out of European conflicts.
- David Thompson crosses Rockies and builds a trading post at headwaters of Columbia River. NWC Upper Kootenay House is built by David Thompson.
- In the spring John Colter joins Manuel Lisa at the Platte River who winters on Yellowstone River at the mouth of the Bighorn River.
- The British ship Leopard searches the U.S. Chesapeake for deserters, kills some of the crew and takes Radford, who is hanged. Pending satisfaction, the United States close their ports to British ships, though reparation is tendered.
- Thomas Jefferson signs bill banning all foreign trade following British attacks on American shipping.
- Election of Ezekiel Hart in Trois-Rivières during a by-election on April 11.
- Horse racing was introduced to Quebec, following the arrival of Sir James Craig. The first race took place in July 1807.

== Births ==
- May – William Workman, businessman and municipal politician (d.1878)
- August 31 – John Young, 1st Baron Lisgar, Governor General (d.1876)
- October 4 – Louis-Hippolyte Lafontaine, politician (d.1864)
- December 14 – Francis Hincks, politician (d.1885)

=== Full date unknown ===
- Joseph Casavant, manufacturer of pipe organs (d.1874)

== Deaths ==
- July 20 – Jean-Marie Ducharme, fur trader (b. 1723)

== Historical documents ==
Imported from Canada at Port of London "last week" were skins of 216,000 deer, 186,000 beaver, 125,000 raccoons, 54,000 marten, 15,000 wolves etc.

Some "paragraphs relating to the differences with Great Britain[...]extracted from the Official paper of the American Government" allude to war

Boston report says U.S. force ready for foreign duty is smaller than Canada and Nova Scotia forces, and French resist raising Canadian militia

Publication of Heriot's Travels through the Canadas is timely because it shows what would "in all probability" be lost in war with U.S.A.

Michilimackinac reports revolt led by man assuming "the character of a Manitou or prophet" to rouse Indigenous people (Note: "savages" used)

Quebec Gazette reports on "good authority that the whole of the Indian nations" in U.S.A. would seek to ally with Britain in case of war

Britain reluctantly signs treaty with U.S. that does not let Canadian and Hudson's Bay Company traders operate in Louisiana

Canadian Courant says British traders are harassed at U.S. inland ports with "extortionary Duties" and "quibbling difficulties"

Halifax court-martial finds Royal Navy sailor guilty of deserting while his ship was in U.S. port (which had led to Chesapeake–Leopard Affair)

=== Lower Canada ===
Argument for bank in L.C. includes need to supplement cash with banknotes (especially for trade with U.S.), and for "punctuality" in merchants' deals

Quoted in translation, Le Canadien says "Anti-Canadians, who have an interest in misrepresenting us," falsely claim they are not loyal to King

U.S. preparations for war have prompted similar measures in L.C., including 20% of militia (men 18–50) levied, their "zeal manifested"

Exporting "Gun-powder, Ammunition, Arms and warlike Stores" to non-British territories prohibited and approval required to remove from any magazine

Upcoming weekly Montreal newspaper is announced "to every patriot and friend of his country who sincerely wishes its welfare and prosperity"

Montreal Island farmer says wheat exports are limited by European supply (except during "scarcity"), lack of Canadian shipping, and poor quality

Insurance allows fire victims to rebuild and "re-establish themselves;" premium is lower in generally stone-built Montreal and Quebec City

Their employer's ad in newspaper says 5 indentured servants have left him, taking tools and owing him money, and that no one should employ them

"Engaged and bound" – Contract ties 20-year-old worker to Northwest Company for five years

Master carpenter Jean-Baptiste Bédard is granted exclusive right to erect bridges according to his two government-approved designs (described)

Law authorizes Quebec Benevolent Society, whose members pay to support themselves in "Sickness, Old Age and Infirmity," and widows and children

"Le Canadien affects to dread being falsified, alias anglified; that is, he objects to his base metal being plated with gold"

"The Canadians find that they have got the whiphand of the English" in L.C., with their majority in and right to speak French in assembly

New York dentist at Quebec City coffeehouse transplants teeth, sets "Natural and Artificial ones" and arrests "decay of those partly destroyed"

New Quebec City resident is tired of servants, whether rural women or soldiers' wives, who are incompetent and impertinent

Frances Brooke's "fine drawings of the happy state of Canada [are] wondrous captivating in a novel," but her times were as scandalous as now

In December in Quebec City, "we have all assumed our winter dresses; furs and flannels are substituted for nankeens and muslins"

Former backwoodsman, now living in Montreal, blames his earlier vanity and lack of manners for his ill-success in beau monde

Painting: French Canadians in circle dance

Painting: French Canadians dancing minuet

Painting: view of Quebec City from Cap Diamant

John Jacob Astor's China trade includes "considerable" and "increasing" exports of tea ("about 2000 Chests" annually) to Upper and Lower Canada

Map: Upper and Lower Canada by English cartographer John Cary

=== Upper Canada ===
U.S. official calls U.C. "fertile, pleasant, and even opulent," contradicting "Southward" opinion that it is "cold, sterile, and unprofitable"

Eight districts in U.C. are each to have 1 public school with 1 teacher, hired by government-appointed trustees and earning £100 annually

Grand River chiefs request Lt.-Gov. Gore not allow transactions without their consent, including sale of land and "curtailment" on remaining land

At "Head of Lake Ontario," Joseph Brant thanks Gore for cowpox vaccination offer to "Indians in this vicinity," but "it is too late in the season"

Detroit man warns his correspondent (both slave owners) in Upper Canada that "bad set of people" is advising enslaved people to flee

Unable to pay debt because of debts owed him, Sandwich merchant not likely to sell slave in Detroit, where slavery "not much in favour"

Petition of 70-year-old, after two years in prison for debt, asks that law "which gives a creditor power unto death, often unjustly," be changed

"We have not at any time within our knowledge, witnessed so much illness in" York – influenza, "cough, lassitude and obstructed respiration"

"As late as 1807, [the population of York was] 580, who resided in two brick buildings, four block houses, and a few log huts[....]"

John Strachan advises young men to reject arguments of "enemies of the Gospel"

Wolf bounty laws are repealed because they are "not found beneficial in proportion to the expence incurred"

=== Nova Scotia ===
Slave owners petition both legislature houses to either secure their right of "property in their Negro Servants" or compensate them for loss

Anglican minister's summertime congregations can be "pretty numerous," but then "small[...]whenever a new light or methodist preacher" is around

"Long and very deep-rooted prejudices have subsisted in (Digby) between the Irish and poor Yankees," says uninvolved "blue-nose"

=== New Brunswick ===
Edward Winslow asks new lieutenant-governor be appointed, as present one lives in England while "crisis" situation exists with U.S.A.

Winslow is unable to find work for his commerce-trained son, saying "the whole trade of [N.B.] would not give bread to five men of ambition"

Persons accused of felony or capital crime have right to see indictment one day before trial and have one or two lawyers assigned to their case

Buyers of smuggled goods are to pay 10% duty on them, such goods will be seized if not reported, and if goods not found, buyer will pay £100

Guoa Newellis and 11 other Malecite people sign agreement allowing them half-mile deep section of land on Saint John River for village and farming

Thomas Costin asks Edward Winslow's help in dispute with Catholics over land granted to him "and to all other School masters after my Decease"

Mail from Halifax to Quebec City is lost when courier's canoe is overset at Grand Falls on Saint John River; attaching buoy would have prevented it

=== Labrador ===
Inuit put up flesh of dead whale found in July in outer islands off Nain for following winter and barter blubber for "many necessities"

Moravian missionaries find Inuit are particularly impressed during Passion-week by prayer contained in John 17 of New Testament

=== Elsewhere ===
U.S. official says British have dominated commerce in western interior, even though most valuable trade is in U.S. territory (Note: "savages" used)

Mackinaw resident says The Prophet turns local Indigenous people away from liquor, hats and other settler goods, and merchants suffer

Photograph: Indigenous burial ring near site of Fort Kootenay
