= Louis Brodeur =

Canadian politician

Louis Brodeur (ca 1775 – July 4, 1860) was a political figure in Lower Canada. He represented Richelieu in the Legislative Assembly of Lower Canada from 1804 to 1808. His name also appears as Louis Le Brodeur.

He was the son of Alexandre Le Brodeur and Angélique Lussie and may have been born at Saint-Charles-sur-Richelieu. In 1808, he married Marie-Josephte Plamondon. Brodeur was a lieutenant in the militia during the War of 1812. He was arrested in 1837 for distributing ammunition to rebels and released in June the following year. Brodeur died at Saint-Charles-sur-Richelieu.
