= Deborah Cottnam =

Canadian poet and schoolmistress

Deborah How Cottnam (c. 1725/1728 – December 31, 1806) was a Canadian poet and schoolmistress. She and her daughter opened a boarding and day school attended by the young daughters of the North American colonist establishment and loyalist gentry, firstly in Salem, Massachusetts and later Halifax, Nova Scotia. Cottnam opened a new school for young girls in the city of Saint John, New Brunswick before retiring in 1793.

== Biography ==
Cottnam was born approximately 1725 to 1728, in either Marblehead, Massachusetts, which is close to Boston, or Canso, Nova Scotia. She was the sole daughter of four known children of the Irish or New England-born merchant and justice of the peace Edward How and his first wife, the Irish-born Deborah Crawley. On May 19, 1728, Cottnam was baptized in Marblehead. From 1732 to 1744, she was brought up on the isolated fishing community of Grassy Island, Canso, which is located in the far north-eastern tip of the Nova Scotia peninsula, where her father worked. Cottnam was possibly educated at home by either both of her parents or by a private tutor. She and her family were sent to Île-Royale (New France), on Cape Breton Island, and then to Boston, Massachusetts as civilian prisoners of war after a force of 350 French infantry invaded Canso during King George's War on May 24, 1744.

Not much is known about the life of Cottnam from 1744 to 1774. She and her family were resident in Salem, Massachusetts between 1762 and 1773 before returning to Nova Scotia, possibly living in Windsor, Nova Scotia. By July 1774, Cottnam had returned to Salem, Massachusetts, and with her young daughter, opening a boarding and day school that was attended by the young daughters of the colonist establishment and the loyalist gentry. This was also done to supplement the family income when her husband became ill. The school taught young girls arithmetic, dancing, French, reading, sewing and writing. Such pupils were the daughters of Joseph Frederick Wallet DesBarres and Mather Byles, and pupils who had a varying length of education, pupils worked with muslin cuffs, samplers and tuckers.

Following the outbreak of the American Revolutionary War, Cottnam and her daughter relocated the school to Halifax, Nova Scotia in 1777. She persuaded the Nova Scotia government to lease her extra land, citing her husband's "avow'd [loyalist] principles & fix'd attachment to Government" and she received 1,000 acres (400 ha) in a remote area that she could not settle on sell for a profit. Cottnam and her daughter continued to operate their school in Halifax until 1786 when the family of loyalists persuaded her to establish a new school for young women in the city of Saint John, New Brunswick when the establishment in Halifax became unappreciative of her. While she was happy in Saint John, the family financial situation continued to be difficult. Cottnam received an annual government pension of £100 transferred to her after Edward How's widow died in 1793 and that same year returned to Windsor.

She also wrote poetry under the pen name "Portia." Many of Cottnam's poems were published in the Acadian Recorder between June 16, and 23, 1845 by Joseph Howe and the William Andrews Clark Memorial Library at the University of California, Los Angeles holds a manuscript of her works compiled by her granddaughter and which was acquired by the university in 2007.

== Personal life ==
Cottnam was married to the Ensign Samuel Cottnam circa 1742 until his death in 1780. The couple had at least two children. On December 31, 1806, she died in Windsor, Nova Scotia and is buried at the Old Parish Burying Ground.

== Legacy ==
Tabitha Marshall in Cottnam's entry in The Canadian Encyclopedia wrote that she had "established highly respected women's schools in the Maritimes." Her entry in the Oxford Dictionary of National Biography written by Louis K. York stated: "it is clear that her career exemplified the best of the dame-school tradition in colonial America."
