= Pierre Weilbrenner =

Canadian politician

Pierre Weilbrenner (January 17, 1771 – August 7, 1840) was a land surveyor, merchant and political figure in Lower Canada. He represented Kent in the Legislative Assembly of Lower Canada from 1804 to 1808.

He was born in Boucherville, the son of Pierre Weilbrenner, a merchant of German descent, and Susanne Tougas dit Laviolette. In 1789, he married Marie-Louise Richard. Weilbrenner received his commission as a surveyor in 1801. He was a merchant in Boucherville. He did not run for reelection to the assembly in 1808. Weilbrenner was a captain in the militia during the War of 1812, later reaching the rank of lieutenant-colonel. In 1820, Weilbrenner was named a justice of the peace and, in 1826, became a commissioner for the Court of Minor Pleas. He died in Boucherville at the age of 69.
