= Janis Babson =

Canadian cancer victim (1950–1961)

Janis Anne Babson
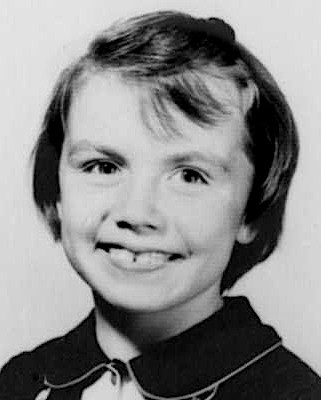
- Portrait of Babson
- Born: September 9, 1950; Windsor, Nova Scotia, Canada
- Died: May 12, 1961 (aged 10); Ottawa, Ontario, Canada
- Cause of death: Leukemia

Janis Anne Babson (September 9, 1950 – May 12, 1961) was a Canadian girl who received posthumous acclaim with the donation of her corneas for transplant after her death from leukemia at the age of 10. Her story was reported in a newspaper article syndicated across Canada, inspiring two books and other memorials. When Janis died of leukemia in 1961, corneal transplantation was a relatively unknown procedure. Although parents who lose young children frequently donate some of their organs to others, Janis's bequest was significant because the donation of her eyes at her death was her own idea, and it inspired many other people—across Canada and elsewhere—to become cornea donors as well.

== White Cane Week ==
Janis happened to see a television program sponsored by an eye bank after watching National Velvet, a program she loved because of her passion for horses. When her youngest brother fell asleep on her lap, she did not want to wake him and remained in front of the television set when a White Cane Week special aired. The program's hosts explained how some cases of blindness could be cured with corneal donations, restoring a recipient's eyesight. After the program Janis, moved, told her mother and father that when she died she wanted to donate her eyes to the Eye Bank. Her parents—Harry Rudolphe (Rudy) Babson, a member of the Royal Canadian Mounted Police and Rita Quinn Babson—knew their daughter was serious about the gift, but it was a big decision for such a young girl.

== Leukemia ==
In early 1959, when Janis was eight years old, her mother noticed that she had lost her energy and appetite. Her father took her to the family pediatrician who noted a great increase in white blood cells from a sample he took. He ordered additional tests and referred her to hematologist Alexander English at the Ottawa Civic Hospital. The tests revealed that Janis was suffering from a sub-acute form of leukemia. At that time, leukemia was invariably fatal; with the chemotherapy available, Janis was expected to live about a year. She responded well to treatments which slowed the advance of the leukemia, and survived about 26 months after her diagnosis.

=== Death ===
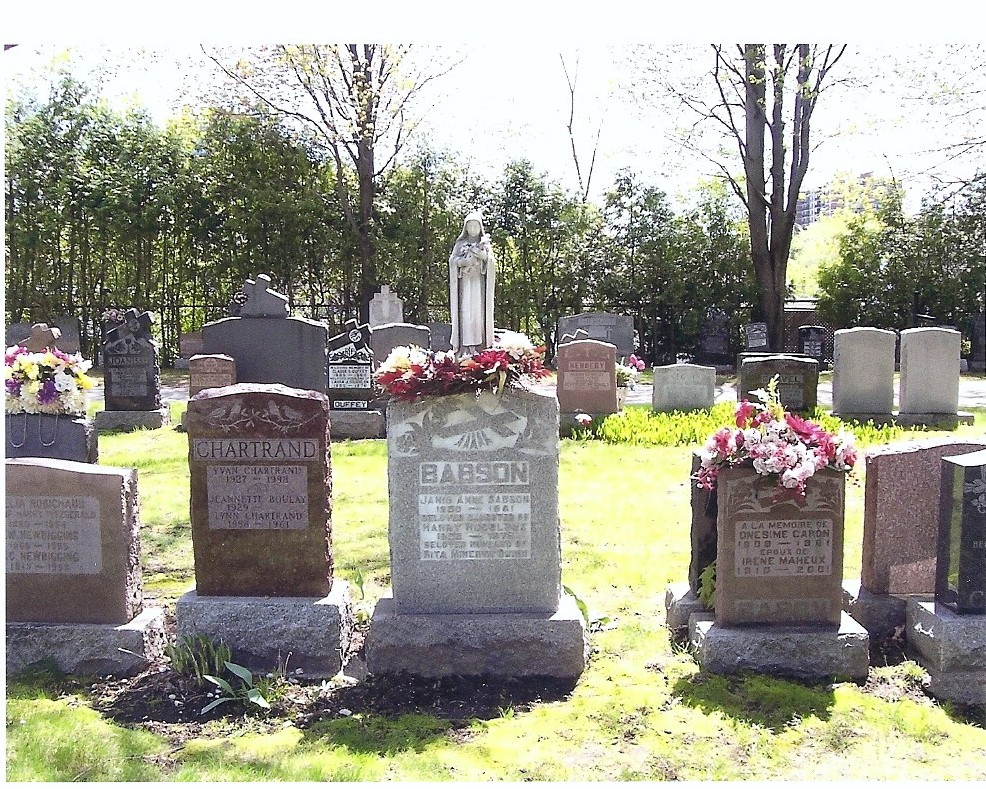
Gravesite of Janis Babson (and her father, Harry Rudolphe Babson), Notre Dame Cemetery, Ottawa

Despite a change in drugs from methotrexate to mercaptopurine, Janis's condition deteriorated in early 1961 as her leukemia worsened and she was hospitalized and released twice. In early May, she was hospitalized for the third (and final) time. Janis died in her parents' arms at 9:25 pm ET on Friday, May 12, 1961. Throughout her illness, Janis reminded her parents about her desire to donate her eyes; their original reluctance gave way when Rudy signed the consent forms for the donation of Janis's eyes a few hours before her death.

Janis is buried in Notre Dame Cemetery in Ottawa. Her funeral Mass was attended by her entire school.

== Legacy ==
Janis's best friend, Tricia Kennedy, moved from Ottawa to Chalk River, Ontario, with her family. When the Kennedys were interviewed by the local paper as part of a get-to-know-your-neighbours feature, Tricia Kennedy announced that her best friend had died of leukemia and donated her eyes to the Eye Bank in Toronto. Impressed, the reporter then contacted the Ottawa Journal. Tim Burke, a reporter for the Journal, contacted the Babsons; his interview became "Little Janis" in his May 31, 1961 "Below the Hill" column. The response was immediate: from Ottawa Mayor Charlotte Whitton to retired pharmacist Abe Silver (who created an endowment to Hebrew University in Janis's name for leukemia research) to groups and individuals who set a record for the number of pledged donations to the Eye Bank.

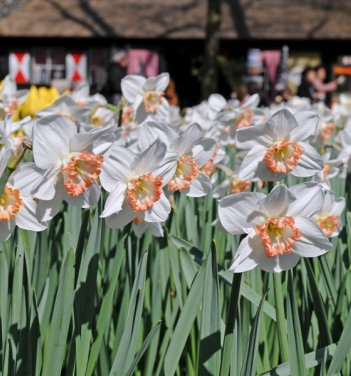
Assortment of Janis Babson Daffodils named in her honour

In 1962, the first of two books on Janis's life was published: Janis of City View (Holy Cross Press) by Rena Ray. The following year Lawrence Elliott, a correspondent for Reader's Digest, published A Little Girl's Gift (Holt, Rinehart & Winston). Six months earlier, a condensed version had appeared in the June 1963 issue of Reader's Digest entitled The Triumph of Janis Babson.

== Tributes ==
The Internet has spawned several websites dedicated to Janis Babson's memory. In addition, her family (mother and siblings) have created a memorial Facebook page where many whose lives were touched by Janis's can leave comments and posts. A 50th-anniversary tribute, arranged by the Babson family, was held May 27, 2011, in Ottawa to commemorate a half-century since Janis's death. It featured Lawrence Elliott, a new commemorative edition of A Little Girl's Gift, and artist Caroline Langill (Custody of the Eyes). A large-cupped, broad-petalled daffodil, white with pink rims, has been named after Janis as a tribute.
