= John Holloway (Royal Navy officer) =

Royal Navy Admiral and colonial administrator (1744–1826)

Admiral John Holloway
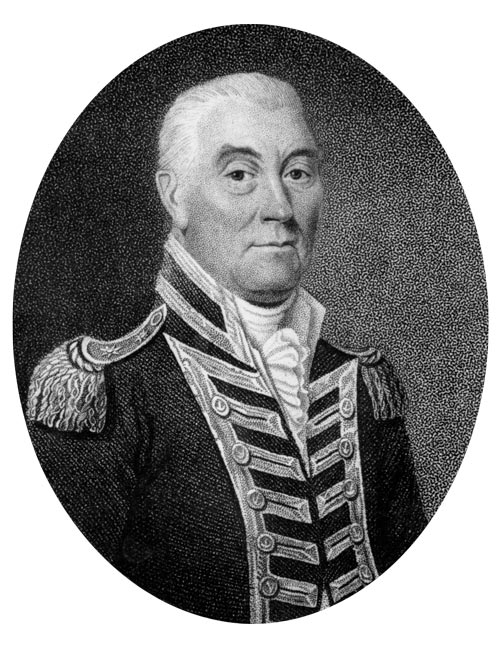
- Portrait of Holloway
- Born: 15 January 1744; Wells, Somerset
- Died: 26 June 1826 (aged 82); Wells, Somerset
- Military career
- Allegiance: Great Britain; United Kingdom
- Branch: Royal Navy
- Service years: 1760–1809
- Rank: Admiral
- Commands: HMS Vengeance; HMS Cambridge; HMS Buffalo; HMS Vigilant; HMS Solebay; HMS Princess Royal; HMS Britannia; HMS Duke; HMS St George; Commodore-Governor of Newfoundland Colony; The Downs
- Conflicts: American Revolutionary War; Capture of St. Lucia; Battle of Martinique; Great Siege of Gibraltar; Battle of Cape Spartel; French Revolutionary Wars; Siege of Toulon; Battle of Genoa; Battle of Hyères Islands; Napoleonic Wars

Viceregal styles of John Holloway
- Reference style: His Excellency
- Spoken style: Your Excellency

Admiral John Holloway (15 January 1744 – 26 June 1826) was a Royal Navy officer and colonial administrator who saw service during the American War of Independence, and the French Revolutionary and Napoleonic Wars, before serving as Governor of Newfoundland between 1807 and 1809.

== Biography ==
=== Early career ===
Holloway was born in Wells, Somerset, and entered the navy in 1760, aged about 13, aboard the 50-gun ship Antelope, under Captain James Webb, who sailed to Newfoundland to serve as Commodore-Governor of the colony. The following year he returned to Newfoundland in the same ship, now under Captain Thomas Graves. Holloway served for another two years in Newfoundland under Sir Hugh Palliser, before sailing for America with Admiral Philip Durell in 1766. In 1768, he joined the Romney, under Commodore Samuel Hood. He was promoted to lieutenant in 1771, and was soon after appointed to the 74-gun ship Marlborough, stationed as a guard-ship at Portsmouth.

=== American Revolutionary War ===
When the American War began, he joined the frigate Perseus under Captain George Elphinstone. After a year he transferred to Preston, the flagship of Commodore William Hotham, and was First Lieutenant of her during the encounter between Admirals Richard Howe and the Comte d'Estaing off Rhode Island on 10 August 1778, where the opposing squadrons were arrayed in line of battle when a storm broke, scattering the ships and preventing a battle from taking place. Towards the end of the year, Commodore Hotham was sent to Barbados, to reinforce Rear-Admiral Samuel Barrington's squadron, with 5,000 troops for the capture of St. Lucia. Some time after the conquest of the island, Holloway moved with Hotham into the Vengeance, but soon joined the Princess Royal, flagship of Admiral Sir Hyde Parker, who promoted him to commander.

On 23 January 1780, he was promoted to post-captain, and returned to the Vengeance, to serve as Commodore Hotham's flag captain, and was present at the Battle of Martinique in April. In September Hotham assumed command at the Leeward Islands. On the night of 10 October the British were moored at St. Lucia when a hurricane struck, lasting for 29 hours. Eight frigates and sloops were completely wrecked, and the rest of the fleet suffered considerable damage. Vengeance finally sailed for England in early 1781, with another ship and three frigates, as escort to a convoy of thirty-four richly-laden merchant ships, mainly Dutch, which had been captured at St. Eustatia in February. On 2 May they encountered a French squadron of six ships and three frigates, under the command of Picquet de la Motte. Hotham managed to preserve his own squadron, but the French captured twenty-six of the merchant ships, valued at 5 million pounds.

Holloway was soon appointed to command of the 80-gun Cambridge, and was stationed off the Texel under Admiral Howe. He next commanded the Buffalo, attached to Howe's fleet that sailed for the relief of Gibraltar on 11 September 1782. On 11 October the convoy reached the Strait of Gibraltar, but strong winds meant that only four storeships reached the anchorage; the rest passed into the Mediterranean. On the 13th the combined fleets of France and Spain set sail from Algeciras, and Howe ordered Holloway to take the storeships either to the Chafarinas Islands off Morocco, or to Oristano in Sardinia, should they be driven past Cape Tres Forcas, and to use his own judgement in bringing them back to the besieged fortress. After two days Buffalo fell in with four enemy ships off the Barbary coast, and only narrowly escaped being captured. One storeship was captured that night, but the rest escaped in the darkness. Finally, after five or six days, the storeships returned to the British fleet at Gibraltar. "Nauticus Junior", the anonymous author of Naval Atlantis, published in 1789, severely criticized Howe for selecting the Buffalo for this duty noting that she had been stationed as flagship in the Downs for some time as she was considered unfit for sea, and was seriously undermanned. Nevertheless, Buffalo took her place in the line of battle in the action against the enemy fleet off Cape Spartel on 20 October, having 6 men killed and 16 wounded.

On his return to England, Holloway was appointed to command of the 64-gun ship Vigilant, but following the signing of the peace treaty in September 1783, she was paid off, and Holloway remained unemployed on half-pay for some time. He was eventually appointed to the frigate Solebay in July 1786, and sailed for the Leeward Islands, where he served alongside Captain Horatio Nelson in Boreas, remaining there until September 1789. During the Spanish Armament of 1790–1791, Holloway commanded the 98-gun Princess Royal, the flagship of Vice-Admiral Hotham.

=== French Revolutionary War ===
On the outbreak of the war with France in 1793 he was appointed to command of Hotham's flagship, the 100-gun Britannia, seeing action at the siege of Toulon. Following the recall of Admiral Samuel Hood in late 1794, Hotham became Commander-in-Chief of the Mediterranean Fleet, and Holloway became his Captain of the Fleet. As such he took part in the Battle of Genoa in March 1795 and the Battle of Hyères Islands in July. At the end of the year Hotham was replaced by Admiral Sir John Jervis, and Holloway was appointed to command of the 98-gun Duke. He was present in her at the Spithead Mutiny in May 1797, and afterwards commanded St George, attached to the Channel Fleet.

On 14 February 1799 Holloway was promoted to rear-admiral, and shortly after was appointed assistant port admiral at Portsmouth, remaining there until the Treaty of Amiens brought a suspension of hostilities in late 1801. Soon after the renewal of the war, in May 1803, he returned to Portsmouth. In the course of the year, he made a survey of the nearby coast; and on his recommendation three 98-gun ships were stationed at Lymington, St. Helens, and at Southampton Water, to guard the Isle of Wight in the event of an invasion.

He was promoted to vice-admiral on 23 April 1804, and served on Downs Station, under his former Captain, George Elphinstone, now Admiral Lord Keith.

=== Governor of Newfoundland ===
On 10 April 1807 Holloway was appointed Governor of Newfoundland. Concerned about the treatment of the native Beothuk people, he issued a proclamation against mistreating them on 30 July 1807, and offered rewards for information about atrocities. Holloway twice sent officers to the Bay of Exploits to meet the Beothuk, and also sent an expedition under William Cull.

Holloway allowed John Ryan to publish Newfoundland's first newspaper, the Royal Gazette and Newfoundland Advertiser, on condition that it would not contain anything "inflammatory against the Government of Great Britain", nor "sow dissension among the inhabitants of this island". A traditionalist, Holloway reverted to the anti-settlement mentality of some past governors and forbade the use of land for cultivation. In March 1809, the British parliament made permanent the island's courts of judicature, and re-annexed Labrador to Newfoundland, largely as a result of Holloway's lobbying. He left Newfoundland in October 1809. He was promoted admiral of the blue the same month, and the next July was made admiral of the white. He died in Wells at the age of eighty-two on 26 June 1826.

== Family ==
In 1781 Holloway married Elizabeth Walrond (b. 5 oct 1749 d. 1838), the daughter of Maine Swete Walrond, 5th Marqués de Vallado, and Sarah Lyons. They had four children:

- Clementina (1782–1851), wife of Admiral Sir Robert Waller Otway, 1st Baronet
- Sarah Emma Orde (1786-1870)
- William Henry Hotham (1789-1802)
- Anne Wallace (1790-1873)

Military offices
Preceded by Philip Patton	Commander-in-Chief, The Downs; 1804–1807	Succeeded by Bartholomew Rowley
Political offices
Preceded by Sir Erasmus Gower	Commodore Governor of Newfoundland; 1807–1809	Succeeded by Sir John Thomas Duckworth
