= 1952 in Canadian television =

This is a list of Canadian television-related events in 1952.

== Events ==
- The first Canadian urban cable television is launched in London, Ontario.
- August 22—At 2:30 PM, the CBC tests television broadcasting by airing the opening of the 73rd Canadian National Exhibition.
- September 6—The first television station in Canada, CBC's CBFT in Montreal, Quebec, begins bilingual broadcasting.
- September 8—The second television station in Canada, CBLT in Toronto, Ontario, begins English language broadcasting.
- November 1—Hockey Night in Canada premieres on CBC.
- November 29—CBLT Toronto presents the 40th Grey Cup game, the first time this Canadian football championship was televised.

== Debuts ==
=== CBC ===
- September 6—Let's See (1952–1953)
- September 8
  - The C.G.E. Show (1952–1959)
  - CBC News Magazine (1952-1981)
- September 9—The Big Revue (1952-1953)
- September 10—Detective Quiz (1952)
- September 12—Carica-Tours (1952)
- October 31—CBC Concert (1952)
- November 1—Hockey Night in Canada (1952–present)
- December 26—Crossword Quiz (1952–1953)
- CFL on CBC (1952–2007)
- Open House (1952–1962)
- Sunshine Sketches (1952–1953)
- The Wayne and Shuster Hour (1952)

=== SRC ===
- Pépinot et Capucine (1952–1954)

== Births ==
Date	Name	Notability
May 13	Mary Walsh	Actress, comedian and social activist
May 28	Denis Akiyama	Voice actor
June 22	Graham Greene	Actor
July 1	Dan Aykroyd	Actor (Ghostbusters)

== Television shows ==
=== CBC ===
- CBC Concert (1952)
- The C.G.E. Show (1952—1959)
- Let's See (1952—1953)
- The Big Revue (1952—1953)
- Detective Quiz (1952)
- Hockey Night in Canada (1952–present)
- Crossword Quiz (1952—1953)
- CBC News Magazine (1952)
- Open House (1952—1962)
- Sunshine Sketches (1952—1953)
- The Wayne and Shuster Hour (1952)

=== SRC ===
- Pépinot et Capucine (1952—1954)

== Ending this year ==
=== CBC ===
- October 1—Detective Quiz (1952)
- December 19—CBC Concert (1952)

== See also ==
- 1952 in Canada
- List of Canadian films
