= 1978 in Canadian television =

List of years in Canadian television
- … 1968; 1969; 1970; 1971; 1972; 1973; 1974; 1975; 1976; 1977; 1978; 1979; 1980; 1981; 1982; 1983; 1984; 1985; 1986; 1987; 1988 …
- Art; Archaeology; Architecture; Literature; Music; Philosophy; Science; +...

The following is a list of events affecting Canadian television in 1978. Events listed include television show debuts, finales, cancellations, and channel launches.

== Events ==
Date	Event
March 28	Juno Awards of 1978.
August 3	The opening ceremony of the 1978 Commonwealth Games airs on CBC Television. Hosted in Edmonton, the games last until August 12.
October 5	Nelvana's second animated television special The Devil and Daniel Mouse airs on CBC Television featuring music and original songs by John Sebastian.
September 21	The last Canadian Film Awards air. They are hosted by John Candy and Catherine O'Hara. The awards are later replaced by the Genie Awards.

=== Debuts ===
Show	Station	Premiere Date
Parlez-moi	TVOntario	April 3
High Hopes	CBC Television	April 3
The Mad Dash	CTV	April 3
Circus	CTV	April 16
Live It Up!	CTV	September 18
Canada After Dark	CBC Television	September 18
The Devil and Daniel Mouse	CBC Television	October 5

=== Ending this year ===
Show	Station	Cancelled
The Bobby Vinton Show	syndication	March 28
Circle 8 Ranch	CKNX-TV	March 28
Search and Rescue	CTV	March 28
Coming Up Rosie	CBC Television	March 28
Sidestreet	CBC Television	November 12
High Hopes	CBC Television	Unknown

== Television shows ==
=== 1950s ===
- Country Canada (1954–2007)
- CBC News Magazine (1952–1981)
- The Friendly Giant (1958–1985)
- Hockey Night in Canada (1952–present)
- The National (1954–present)
- Front Page Challenge (1957–1995)
- Wayne and Shuster Show (1958–1989)

=== 1960s ===
- CTV National News (1961–present)
- Land and Sea (1964–present)
- Man Alive (1967–2000)
- Mr. Dressup (1967–1996)
- The Nature of Things (1960–present, scientific documentary series)
- Question Period (1967–present, news program)
- Reach for the Top (1961–1985)
- Take 30 (1962–1983)
- The Tommy Hunter Show (1965–1992)
- University of the Air (1966–1983)
- W-FIVE (1966–present, newsmagazine program)

=== 1970s ===
- The Beachcombers (1972–1990)
- Canada AM (1972–present, news program)
- Canadian Express (1977–1980)
- Celebrity Cooks (1975–1984)
- City Lights (1973–1989)
- Definition (1974–1989)
- the fifth estate (1975–present, newsmagazine program)
- A Gift To Last (1976–1979)
- Grand Old Country (1975–1981)
- Headline Hunters (1972–1983)
- King of Kensington (1975–1980)
- Let's Go (1976–1984)
- The Magic Lie (1977–1979)
- Marketplace (1972–present, newsmagazine program)
- Ombudsman (1974–1980)
- Polka Dot Door (1971-1993)
- Science Magazine (1975–1979)
- Second City Television (1976–1984)
- This Land (1970–1982)
- V.I.P. (1973–1983)
- The Watson Report (1975–1981)
- 100 Huntley Street (1977–present, religious program)

== TV movies ==
- Catsplay
- Drying Up the Streets
- Dying Hard
- A Matter of Choice
- One Night Stand
- Scoop
- Seer Was Here
- Tyler

== Television stations ==
=== Debuts ===
Date	Market	Station	Channel	Affiliation	Notes/References
June 4	Rimouski, Quebec	CFER-TV	11	TVA	
September 17	Rivière-du-Loup, Quebec	CIMT-TV	9	TVA	
October 3	Quebec City, Quebec	Canal de l'Assemblee nationale	(cable-only)	Community station (Ind.)	
October 30	Gatineau, Que. (Ottawa, Ontario)	CHOT-TV	40	TVA	
Unknown	Neepawa, Manitoba	NAC TV	12 (cable-only)	Community channel	

=== Closures ===
Date	Market	Station	Channel	Affiliation	Notes
July 31	Moose Jaw, Saskatchewan	CBKMT	4	CBC	Became CBKT-1 as a rebroadcaster of CBKT-TV/Regina. Complete shutdown of this station took place on July 31, 2012.

== See also ==
- 1978 in Canada
- List of Canadian films
