= 1977 in Canadian television =

The following is a list of events affecting Canadian television in 1977. Events listed include television show debuts, finales, cancellations, and channel launches.

== Events ==
Date	Event
March 16	Juno Awards of 1977.
March 20–21	Converging Lines, a two-part CBC television documentary presenting the Jewish and Islamic faiths.
October 18	CBC Television airs complete House of Commons deliberations for the first time.
November 20	The 28th Canadian Film Awards air on CBC Television.
December 4	Nelvana's very first animated special A Cosmic Christmas airs on CBC Television.
December 4	One of The Jim Henson Company's well known and renowned TV specials Emmet Otter's Jug-Band Christmas begins on CBC Television as the very first country to broadcast it. The special will begin airing in the US the next year on HBO on December 17, 1978 and on HBO once again and then on ABC in 1980.

=== Debuts ===
Show	Station	Premiere Date
The Ghosts of Motley Hall	TVO	
Crosspoint	CBC Television	January 2
Krazy House	CBC Television	January 12
Search and Rescue	CTV	June 15
100 Huntley Street	Global	June 15
The Magic Lie	CBC Television	June 15
Softly, Softly: Task Force	CBET-DT	June 18
Beyond Reason	CBC Television	June 27
Canadian Express	CBC Television	September 22
Passe-Partout	Radio Québec	November 14
Emmet Otter's Jug-Band Christmas	CBC Television	December 4
A Cosmic Christmas	CBC Television	December 4

=== Ending this year ===
Show	Station	Cancelled
Bluff	CBC Television	April 27
Crosspoint	CBC Television	June 26
Howie Meeker's Hockey School	CBC Television	Unknown
The Pig and Whistle	CTV	Unknown

== Television shows ==
=== 1950s ===
- Country Canada (1954–2007)
- CBC News Magazine (1952–1981)
- Circle 8 Ranch (1955–1978)
- The Friendly Giant (1958–1985)
- Hockey Night in Canada (1952–present)
- The National (1954–present)
- Front Page Challenge (1957–1995)
- Wayne and Shuster Show (1958–1989)

=== 1960s ===
- CTV National News (1961–present)
- Land and Sea (1964–present)
- Man Alive (1967–2000)
- Mr. Dressup (1967–1996)
- The Nature of Things (1960–present, scientific documentary series)
- Question Period (1967–present, news program)
- Reach for the Top (1961–1985)
- Take 30 (1962–1983)
- The Tommy Hunter Show (1965–1992)
- University of the Air (1966–1983)
- W-FIVE (1966–present, newsmagazine program)

=== 1970s ===
- The Beachcombers (1972–1990)
- The Bobby Vinton Show (1975–1978)
- Canada AM (1972–present, news program)
- City Lights (1973–1989)
- Celebrity Cooks (1975–1984)
- Coming Up Rosie (1975–1978)
- Definition (1974–1989)
- the fifth estate (1975–present, newsmagazine program)
- A Gift To Last (1976–1979)
- Grand Old Country (1975–1981)
- Headline Hunters (1972–1983)
- King of Kensington (1975–1980)
- Let's Go (1976–1984)
- Marketplace (1972–present, newsmagazine program)
- Ombudsman (1974–1980)
- Polka Dot Door (1971-1993)
- Science Magazine (1975–1979)
- Second City Television (1976–1984)
- Sidestreet (1975–1978)
- This Land (1970–1982)
- V.I.P. (1973–1983)
- The Watson Report (1975–1981)

== TV movies ==
- Ada
- Dreamspeaker
- Hank
- The Machine Age
- Maria
- The Prophet from Pugwash
- Someday Soon...
- The Tar Sands

== Television stations ==
=== Debuts ===
Date	Market	Station	Channel	Affiliation	Notes/References
November 5	Sault Ste. Marie, Ontario	CHBX-TV	2	CTV	
August 15	Hull, Quebec (Ottawa, Ontario)	CIVO-TV	30	Télé-Québec	

=== Closures ===
Date	Market	Station	Channel	Affiliation	Notes
March 30	Hull, Quebec	CFVO-TV	30	TVA	

== Births ==
Date	Name	Notability
January 5	Oluniké Adeliyi	Actress
August 10	Layla Alizada	Actress (Jane the Virgin)

== See also ==
- 1977 in Canada
- List of Canadian films
