= 1953 in Canadian television =

This is a list of Canadian television-related events in 1953.

== Notable events ==
Date	Event
May 14	The CBC's television microwave network linking Ottawa to Montreal and Toronto, provided by Bell Media, was completed, allowing viewers of CBLT/Toronto and CBFT/Montreal to view the same live programming.
June 3	KVOS-TV (channel 12) signs on the air as an affiliate of the short-lived DuMont Television Network. Licensed to Bellingham, Washington, United States, it provided the first television signal to ever serve the Vancouver, British Columbia area. KVOS-TV is a border blaster serving both sides of the Canada–United States border. That station's first broadcast was the BBC’s coverage of the Coronation of Queen Elizabeth II.

== Television shows ==
=== CBC ===
- CBC News Magazine (1952-1981)
- Crossword Quiz (1952-1953)
- The C.G.E. Show (1952-1959)
- Hockey Night in Canada (1952-present)
- Let's See (1952-1953)
- Open House (1952-1962)
- Sunshine Sketches (1952-1953)

=== SRC ===
- Pépinot et Capucine (1952-1954)

=== Ending this year ===
- Crossword Quiz (1952-1953)
- Let's See (1952-1953)
- Sunshine Sketches (1952-1953)
- The Big Revue (1952-1953)

== Television stations ==
=== Debuts ===
Date	Market	Station	Channel	Affiliation	Ref.
June 2	Ottawa, Ontario	CBOT	4	CBC Television (O&O)	
June 3	Bellingham, Washington/ Vancouver, British Columbia	KVOS-TV	12	DuMont Television Network	
October 25	Sudbury, Ontario	CKSO-TV	5	CBC Television	
November 28	London, Ontario	CFPL-TV	10	CBC Television	
December 16	Vancouver, British Columbia	CBUT	2	CBC Television (O&O)	

== See also ==
- 1953 in Canada
- 1953 in television
