= 1959 in Canadian television =

The following is a list of events affecting Canadian television in 1959. Events listed include television show debuts, finales, cancellations, and channel launches.

== Notable events ==
- The CBC Television's cross-country television microwave network was extended to Newfoundland and Labrador.

== Births ==
| Date | Name | Notability |
|---|---|---|
| May 12 | Ron Rubin | Actor (Sailor Moon) |

== Television shows ==
=== Debuts ===
- Chez Hélène (1959-1973)

=== Programs on-air this year ===
- Country Canada (1954-2007)
- CBC News Magazine (1952-1981)
- The National (1954–present)
- The C.G.E. Show (1952-1959)
- Chez Hélène (1959-1973)
- Circle 8 Ranch (1955-1978)
- The Friendly Giant (1958-1985)
- Front Page Challenge (1957-1995)
- Hockey Night in Canada (1952–present)
- Maggie Muggins (1955–1962)
- Open House (1952-1962)
- Wayne and Shuster Show (1958-1989)

== Television stations ==
=== Debuts ===
| Date | Market | Station | Channel | Affiliation | Ref. |
|---|---|---|---|---|---|
| January 15 | Dawson Creek, British Columbia | CJDC-TV | 5 | CBC Television | |
| June 17 | Corner Brook, Newfoundland and Labrador | CBYT | 5 | CBC Television (via CBHT/Halifax, NS) | Shut down July 31, 2012 |
| July 7 | Moose Jaw, Saskatchewan | CHAB-TV | 4 | CBC Television | Shut down July 31, 1978 |
| October 17 | Carleton, Quebec | CHAU-TV | 5 | Radio-Canada | |
| October 18 | Cornwall, Ontario | CJSS-TV | 8 | CBC Television | |
| December 21 | Moncton, New Brunswick | CBAFT | 11 | Radio-Canada | |

== See also ==
- 1959 in Canada
- 1959 in television
