= 1954 in Canadian television =

This is a list of Canadian television-related events in 1954.

== Notable events ==
- CBWT, Winnipeg's CBC Television-Radio Canada Television station debuts on May 31, 1954.

== Births ==
- March 4 – Catherine O'Hara, Canadian–American actress, writer and comedian (d. 2026)
- March 13 – Robin Duke, actress and comedian (SCTV, Saturday Night Live)
- May 24 – Marc Akerstream, actor (d. 1998)
- July 5 – Debra McGrath, actress and comedian (SCTV)
- August 21 – Johanne Garneau, Québécoise actress

== Television shows ==
=== Debuts ===
- Burns Chuckwagon from the Stampede Corral (1954–1955)
- Country Canada
- CBC News: The National

=== Endings ===
- Pépinot et Capucine (1952-1954, SRC)

=== Programs on-air this year ===
==== CBC ====
- Country Canada (1954-2007)
- CBC News Magazine (1952-1981)
- The National (1954–present)
- The C.G.E. Show (1952-1959)
- Hockey Night in Canada (1952–present)
- Open House (1952-1962)

==== SRC ====
- Pépinot et Capucine (1952-1954)

== Television stations ==
Date	Market	Station	Channel	Affiliation	Source
January 10	Montreal, Quebec	CBMT	6	CBC Television (O&O, primary); Paramount TV Net. (secondary)	
March 1	Kitchener, Ontario	CKCO-TV	13	CBC Television	
March 22	Fredericton, New Brunswick	CHSJ-TV	4	CBC Television	
May 31	Winnipeg, Manitoba	CBWT	4	CBC Television (O&O, primary); Paramount TV Net. (secondary)	
June 7	Hamilton/Toronto, Ontario	CHCH-TV	11	CBC Television	
July 28	Regina, Saskatchewan	CKCK-TV	2	CBC Television (primary); CBS (secondary)	
August 16	Pembroke/Ottawa, Ontario	CHOV-TV	5	CBC Television	
September 16	Windsor, Ontario	CKLW-TV	9	CBC Television (primary); DuMont Television Network (secondary)	
October 4	Thunder Bay, Ontario	CFPA-TV	2	CBC Television	
October 8	Calgary, Alberta	CHCT-TV	2	CBC Television	
October 9	Sydney, Nova Scotia	CJCB-TV	4	CBC Television	
October 25	Edmonton, Alberta	CFRN-TV	3	CBC Television	
November 21	Rimouski, Quebec	CJBR-TV	3	Radio-Canada	
November 30	Moncton, New Brunswick	CKCW-TV	2	CBC Television	
December 5	Saskatoon, Saskatchewan	CFQC-TV	8	CBC Television	
December 18	Kingston, Ontario	CKWS-TV	11	CBC Television	
December 20	Halifax, Nova Scotia	CBHT	3	CBC Television (O&O)	
