= 1957 in Canadian television =

This is a list of Canadian television-related events in 1957.

== Births ==
Date	Name	Notability
September 19	Mark Acheson	Actor, voice actor

== Television programs ==
=== Debuts ===
- Front Page Challenge (1957–1995)
- Bobino (1957–1985)

=== Programs on-air this year ===
==== CBC ====
- Country Canada (1954–2007)
- CBC News Magazine (1952–1981)
- The National (1954–present)
- The C.G.E. Show (1952–1959)
- Circle 8 Ranch (1955–1978)
- Front Page Challenge (1957–1995)
- Hockey Night in Canada (1952–present)
- Maggie Muggins (1955–1962)
- Open House (1952–1962)

== Television stations ==
=== Debuts ===
Date	Market	Station	Channel	Affiliation	Ref.
March 17	Quebec City, Quebec	CKMI-TV	5	CBC Television	
April 8	Kamloops, British Columbia	CFCR-TV	4	CBC Television	
September 14	Medicine Hat, Alberta	CHAT-TV	6	CBC Television	
September 21	Kelowna, British Columbia	CHBC-TV	2	CBC Television	
December 11	Red Deer, Alberta	CHCA-TV	6	CBC Television	
December 23	Swift Current, Saskatchewan	CJFB-TV	5	CBC Television	
December 25	Rouyn-Noranda, Quebec	CKRN-TV	7	Radio-Canada (primary); CBC Television (secondary)	

=== Network affiliation changes ===
Date	Market	Station	Channel	Old affiliation	New affiliation	Source
March 17	Quebec City, Quebec	CFCM-TV	4	CBC Television	Radio-Canada	

== See also ==
- 1957 in Canada
- 1957 in television
