= 1955 in Canadian television =

This is a list of Canadian television-related events in 1955.

== Television programs ==
=== Debuts ===
- Circle 8 Ranch (1955–1978)
- Maggie Muggins (1955–1962)

=== Endings ===
- Burns Chuckwagon from the Stampede Corral (1954–1955)

=== Programs on-air this year ===
==== CBC ====
- Country Canada (1954-2007)
- CBC News Magazine (1952-1981)
- The National (1954–present)
- The C.G.E. Show (1952-1959)
- Circle 8 Ranch (1955-1978)
- Hockey Night in Canada (1952–present)
- Maggie Muggins (1955–1962)
- Open House (1952-1962)

== Television stations ==
=== Debuts ===
Date	Market	Station	Channel	Affiliation	Source
January 28	Brandon, Manitoba	CKX-TV	5	CBC Television	
March 25	Peterborough, Ontario	CHEX-TV	12	CBC Television	
June 24	Ottawa, Ontario	CBOFT	9	Radio-Canada	
September 6	St. John's, Newfoundland and Labrador	CJON-TV	6	CBC Television	
September 28	Barrie/Toronto, Ontario	CKVR-TV	3	CBC Television	
November 18	Wingham/London, Ontario	CKNX-TV	8	CBC Television	
November 20	Lethbridge, Alberta	CISA-TV	7	CBC Television	
November 28	Sault Ste. Marie, Ontario	CJIC-TV	5	CBC Television	
December 1	Jonquiere/Saguenay, Quebec	CKRS-TV	12	Radio-Canada	
December 19	North Bay, Ontario	CKNY-TV	10	CBC Television	

=== Network affiliation changes ===
Date	Market	Station	Channel	Old affiliation	New affiliation	Source
Unknown	Vancouver, British Columbia (Licensed to Bellingham, Washington, USA)	KVOS-TV	12	DuMont Television Network (primary); CBS (secondary)	CBS (primary); DuMont (secondary)	
