= 1955 in Canada =

- Decades: 1930s; 1940s; 1950s; 1960s; 1970s
- See also: History of Canada; Timeline of Canadian history; List of years in Canada

Events from the year 1955 in Canada.

== Incumbents ==
=== Crown ===
- Monarch – Elizabeth II

=== Federal government ===
- Governor General – Vincent Massey
- Prime Minister – Louis St. Laurent
- Chief Justice of Canada – Patrick Kerwin (Ontario)
- Parliament – 22nd

=== Provincial governments ===
==== Lieutenant governors ====
- Lieutenant Governor of Alberta – John J. Bowlen
- Lieutenant Governor of British Columbia – Clarence Wallace (until October 3) then Frank Mackenzie Ross
- Lieutenant Governor of Manitoba – John Stewart McDiarmid
- Lieutenant Governor of New Brunswick – David Laurence MacLaren
- Lieutenant Governor of Newfoundland – Leonard Outerbridge
- Lieutenant Governor of Nova Scotia – Alistair Fraser
- Lieutenant Governor of Ontario – Louis Orville Breithaupt
- Lieutenant Governor of Prince Edward Island – Thomas William Lemuel Prowse
- Lieutenant Governor of Quebec – Gaspard Fauteux
- Lieutenant Governor of Saskatchewan – William John Patterson

==== Premiers ====
- Premier of Alberta – Ernest Manning
- Premier of British Columbia – W.A.C. Bennett
- Premier of Manitoba – Douglas Campbell
- Premier of New Brunswick – Hugh John Flemming
- Premier of Newfoundland – Joey Smallwood
- Premier of Nova Scotia – Henry Hicks
- Premier of Ontario – Leslie Frost
- Premier of Prince Edward Island – Alex Matheson
- Premier of Quebec – Maurice Duplessis
- Premier of Saskatchewan – Tommy Douglas

=== Territorial governments ===
==== Commissioners ====
- Commissioner of Yukon – Wilfred George Brown (until June 8) then Frederick Howard Collins
- Commissioner of Northwest Territories – Robert Gordon Robertson

== Events ==
- January 7 – The first television broadcast of the opening of parliament
- February 1 – The Bank of Toronto and The Dominion Bank merge to form the Toronto-Dominion Bank
- February 23 - Military exercise Operation Bulldog III in Yellowknife.
- March 17- Richard Riot
- April 2 – The Angus L. Macdonald Bridge connecting Halifax to Dartmouth opens.
- June 9 – 1955 Ontario general election: Leslie Frost's PCs win a fourth consecutive majority
- June 29 – 1955 Alberta general election: Ernest Manning's Social Credit Party wins a sixth consecutive majority.
- July 11 – Seven teenagers die in a mountaineering accident on Mount Temple in Banff National Park.
- Cape Breton Island is connected to the mainland by the Canso Causeway

== Arts and literature ==
=== New books ===
- Gabrielle Roy: Rue Deschambault

=== Awards ===
- See 1955 Governor General's Awards for a complete list of winners and finalists for those awards.
- Stephen Leacock Award: Robertson Davies, Leaven of Malice

=== Music ===
- Glenn Gould's first recording of the Goldberg Variations is made.

== Sport ==
- March 13 – In an NHL game in Boston, Hal Laycoe cuts Maurice Richard with a high stick. After the whistle, Richard repeatedly bludgeons Laycoe, then punches linesman Cliff Thompson unconscious.
- March 17 – The Richard Riot erupts in Montreal after the NHL suspends Maurice Richard for the remainder of the season.
- April 14 – The Detroit Red Wings win their seventh (and last until 1997) Stanley Cup by defeating the Montreal Canadiens 4 games to 3.
- April 29 – The Ontario Hockey Association's Toronto Marlboros win their second (and first since 1929) Memorial Cup by defeating the Saskatchewan Junior Hockey League's Regina Pats 4 games to 1. All games were played at Regina Exhibition Stadium
- November 26 – The Edmonton Eskimos win their second (consecutive) Grey Cup by defeating the Montreal Alouettes by the score of 34 to 19 in the 43rd Grey Cup played at Empire Stadium in Vancouver
- The Canadian Sports Hall of Fame is created.

== Births ==
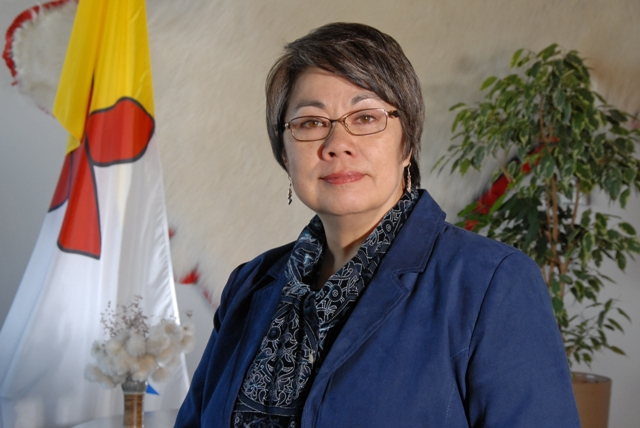
Eva Aariak

=== January to June ===
- January 1 – Precious, wrestler and manager
- January 4 – John Nunziata, politician
- January 6 – Alex Forsyth, ice hockey player
- January 8 – Joan Kingston, nurse, educator, and politician
- January 10 - Eva Aariak, politician, and 2nd Premier of Nunavut
- January 28 – Odette Lapierre, long-distance runner
- February 23 – Jerry Holland, fiddler
- February 25 – Camille Thériault, politician and 29th Premier of New Brunswick
- February 27 – MaryAnn Mihychuk, politician
- March 16 – Andy Scott, politician and Minister
- April 6 – Cathy Jones, comedian and writer
- April 25 – Jane Stewart, politician and Minister
- May 10 – Robert Woodbury, Canadian former sailor athlete
- May 12 – Yvon Godin, politician
- May 14 – Marie Chouinard, dancer, choreographer and dance company director
- June 14 – Joe Preston, politician
- June 16 – J. Jill Robinson, writer

=== July to December ===
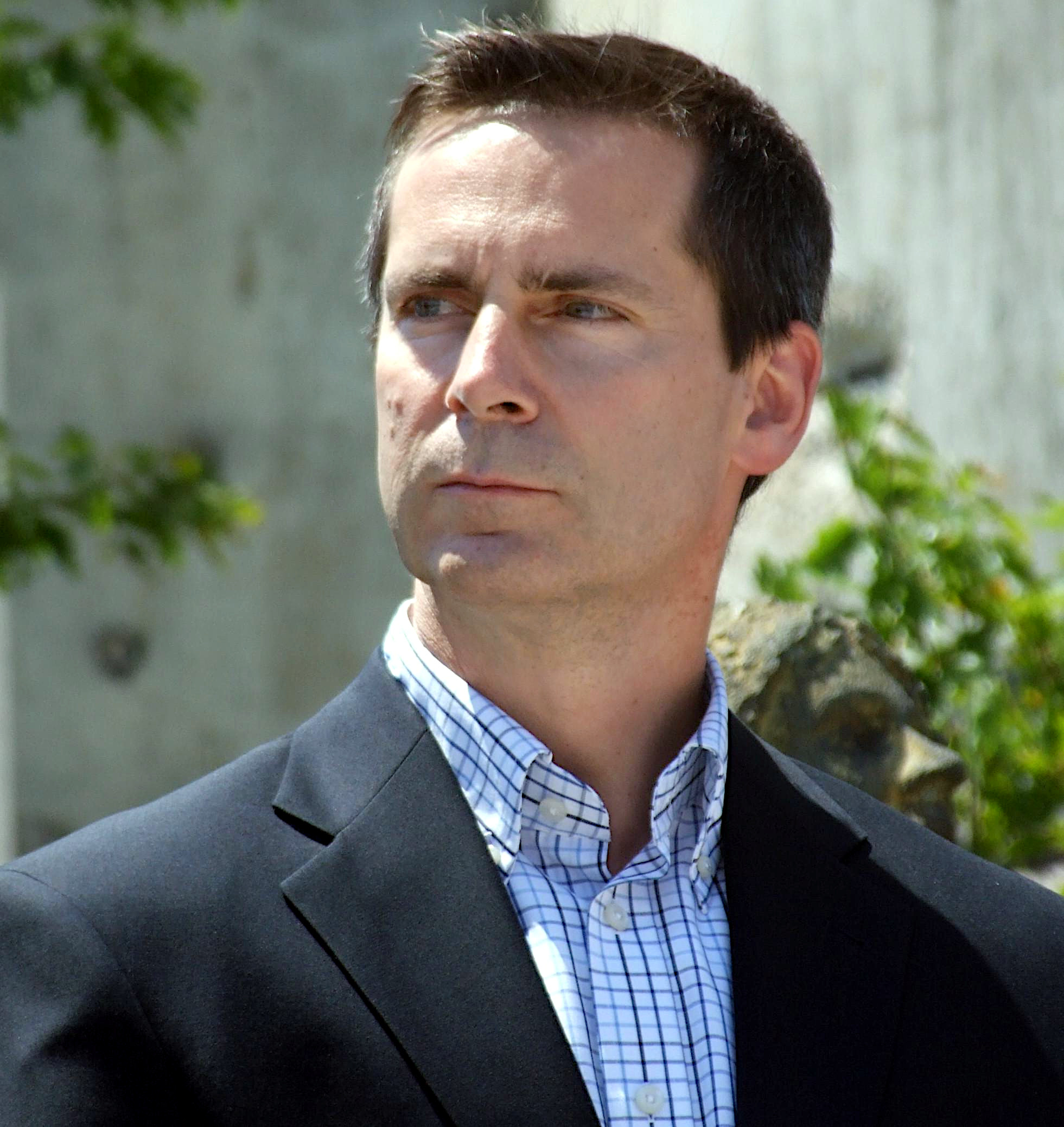
Dalton McGuinty

- July 7 – Gord Mackintosh, politician
- July 13 – Hubert Lacroix, lawyer and President and CEO of the Canadian Broadcasting Corporation
- July 17 – Geneviève Cadieux, artist
- July 19 – Dalton McGuinty, lawyer, politician and 24th Premier of Ontario
- August 6 – Gilles Bernier, politician
- August 12 – Tooker Gomberg, politician and environmental activist (d. 2004)
- August 19 – Bev Desjarlais, politician
- August 31 – Sidney McKnight, boxer

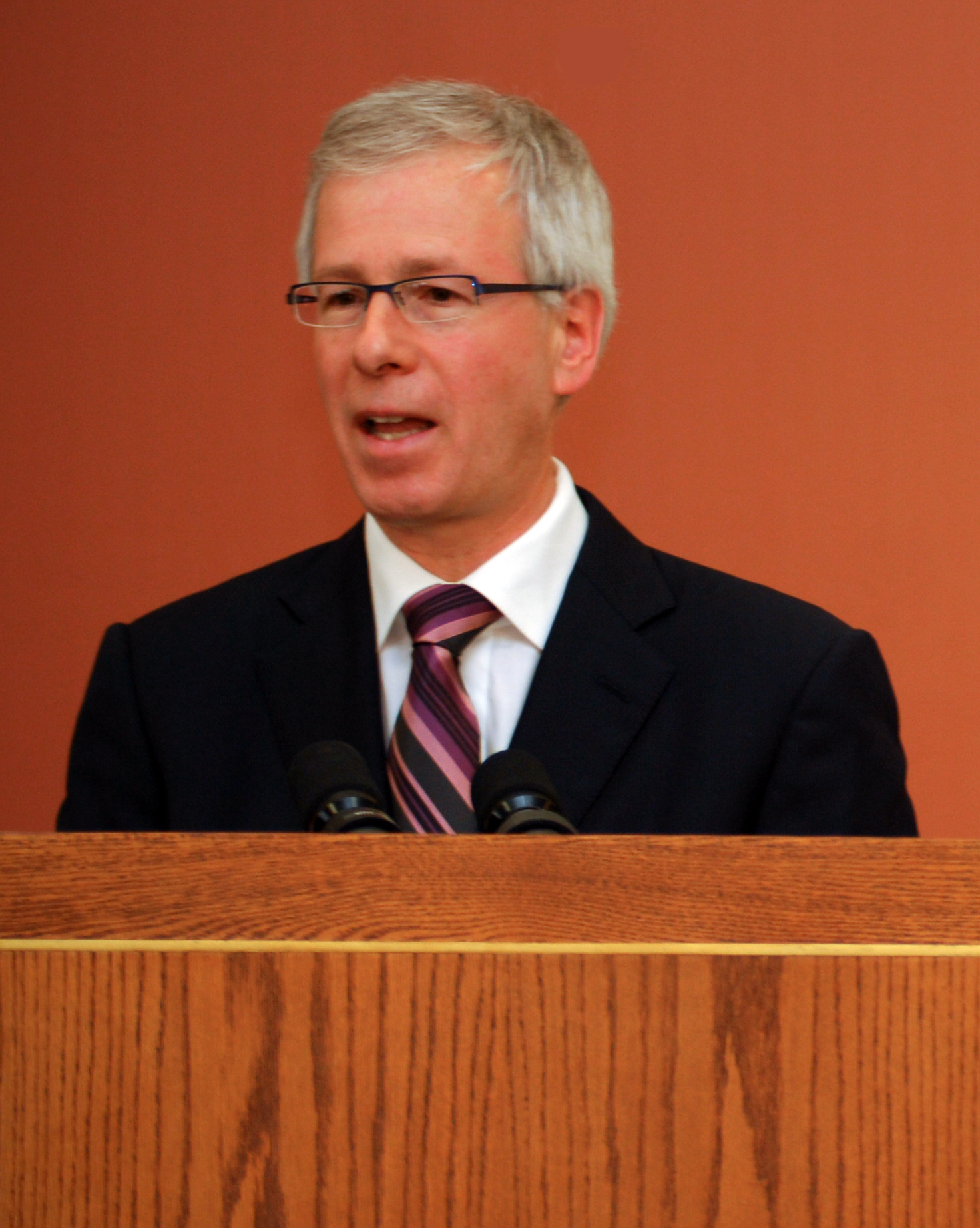
Stéphane Dion

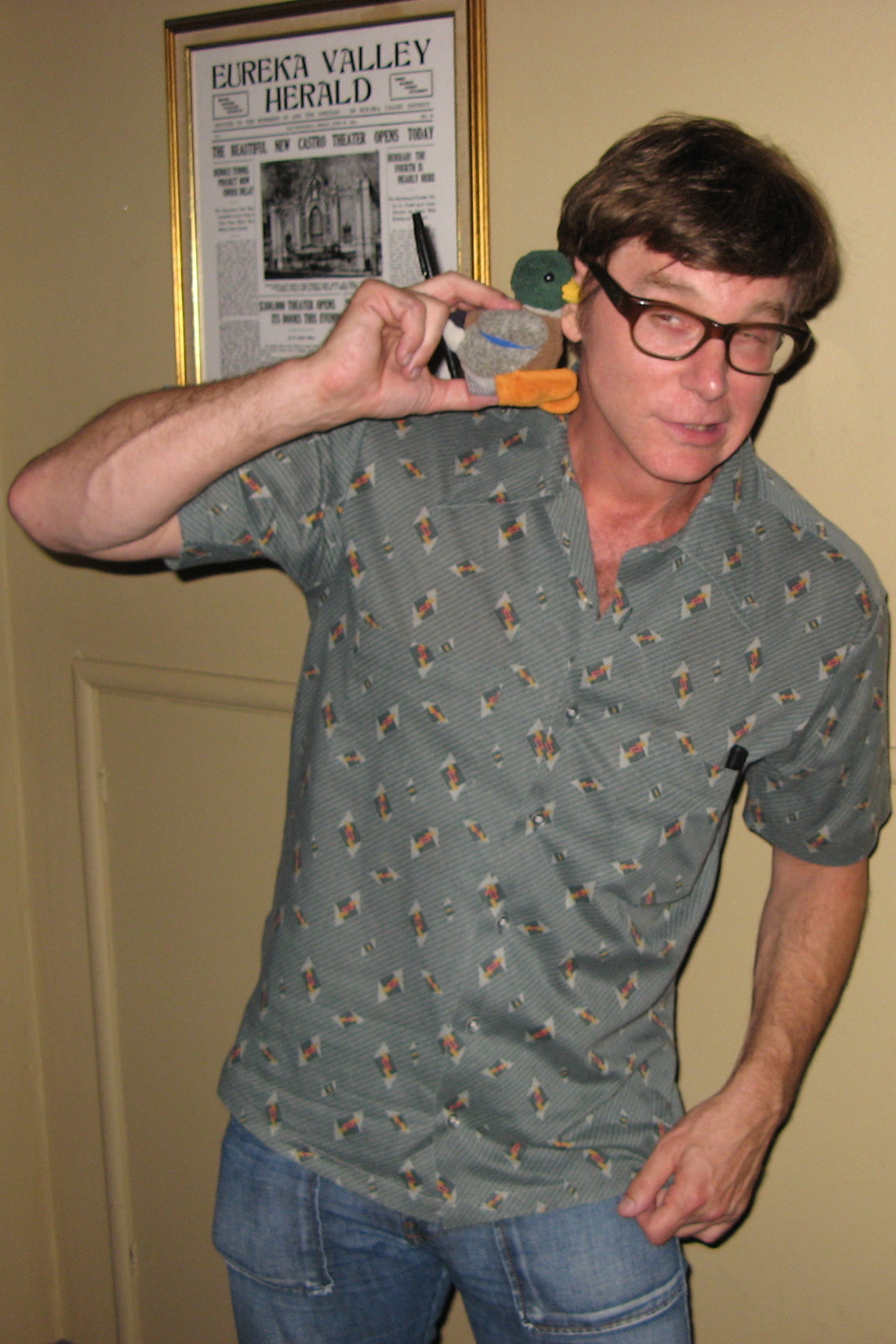
John Kricfalusi

- September 9 - John Kricfalusi, animator and voice actor
- September 28 – Stéphane Dion, politician and Minister
- October 12 – Jane Siberry (Issa), singer-songwriter
- October 30 — Jim Hart, Reform Member of Parliament
- November 4 – Rodger Cuzner, politician
- November 10 – Ken Holland, ice hockey player
- November 11 – Teri York, diver
- November 29 — Howie Mandel, actor, comedian and producer
- December 13 – Pat Martin, politician

=== Full date unknown ===
- Vatche Arslanian, Canadian Red Cross worker, killed in Iraq (d. 2003)
- Kim Morrissey, poet and playwright

== Deaths ==
- April 24 – Walter Seymour Allward, sculptor (b. 1876)
- April 26 – Lyman Duff, jurist and Chief Justice of Canada (b. 1865)
- May 10 – Tommy Burns, only Canadian born world heavyweight champion boxer (b. 1881)
- June 16 – Ozias Leduc, painter (b. 1864)
- August 5 – Izaak Walton Killam, financier (b. 1885)
- August 7 – Alexander Stirling MacMillan, businessman, politician and Premier of Nova Scotia (b. 1871)
- October 1 – Charles Christie, motion picture studio owner (b. 1880)

== See also ==
- 1955 in Canadian television
- List of Canadian films
