= 1956 in Canadian television =

This is a list of Canadian television-related events in 1956.

== Notable events ==
- CBC-Radio Canada microwave relay reaches Winnipeg via the TransCanada Microwave System.

== Births ==
- October 8 – Arlene Dickinson, South African-Canadian businesswoman, television personality, author and investor
- October 20 – Sonja Ball, voice actress, singer and songwriter (The Busy World of Richard Scarry, Arthur)
- November 26 – Don Lake, writer, producer and actor

== Television programs ==
=== Programs on-air this year ===
==== CBC ====
- Country Canada (1954-2007)
- CBC News Magazine (1952-1981)
- The National (1954–present)
- The C.G.E. Show (1952-1959)
- Circle 8 Ranch (1955-1978)
- Hockey Night in Canada (1952–present)
- Maggie Muggins (1955–1962)
- Open House (1952-1962)

== Television stations ==
=== Debuts ===
Date	Market	Station	Channel	Affiliation	Ref.
June 21	Timmins, Ontario	CFCL-TV	6	CBC Television	Shut down October 27, 2002
July 1	Charlottetown, Prince Edward Island	CFCY-TV	13	CBC Television	
August 12	Sherbrooke, Quebec	CHLT-TV	7	Radio-Canada (primary); CBC Television (secondary)	
December 1	Victoria, British Columbia	CHEK-TV	6	CBC Television	

=== Network affiliation changes ===
Date	Market	Station	Channel	Old affiliation	New affiliation	Source
Unknown	Wingham, Ontario	CKNX-TV	8	CBC Television	CBC Television (primary); CBS (secondary)	

== See also ==
- 1956 in Canada
- 1956 in television
