= 1973 in Canadian television =

The following is a list of events affecting Canadian television in 1973. Events listed include television show debuts, finales, cancellations, and channel launches.

== Events ==
Date	Event
March 12	Juno Awards of 1973.
April 20	Anik A2, a television satellite, launches in Northern Canada. It helps bring better reception and live television to that area.
June 30	Alberta Access goes on the air.
October 12	The 1973 Canadian Film Awards are held. The awards are presented at a press conference instead of a special ceremony.

=== Debuts ===
Show	Station	Premiere Date
City Lights	Citytv	March 8
Howie Meeker's Hockey School	CBC Television	March 8
V.I.P.	CBC Television	March 8
Arts '73	CBC Television	March 8
Puppet People	CTV	March 8
The Starlost	CTV	22 September
Target: The Impossible	CBC Television	22 September
CBC Drama '73	CBC Television	September 30
The Collaborators	CBC Television	December 12

=== Ending this year ===
Show	Station	Cancelled
Chez Hélène	CBC Television	May 25
Alan Hamel's Comedy Bag	CBC Television	June 9
Alphabet Soup	CBC Television	December 4
Telescope	CBC Television	Unknown
George	CTV	Unknown
Here Come the Seventies	CTV	Unknown
The Pierre Berton Show	CTV	Unknown

== Television shows ==
=== 1950s ===
- Country Canada (1954–2007)
- CBC News Magazine (1952–1981)
- Circle 8 Ranch (1955–1978)
- The Friendly Giant (1958–1985)
- Hockey Night in Canada (1952–present)
- The National (1954–present)
- Front Page Challenge (1957–1995)
- Wayne and Shuster Show (1958–1989)

=== 1960s ===
- Audubon Wildlife Theatre (1968–1974)
- CTV National News (1961–present)
- Elwood Glover's Luncheon Date (1963–1975)
- Land and Sea (1964–present)
- Man Alive (1967–2000)
- Mr. Dressup (1967–1996)
- The Nature of Things (1960–present, scientific documentary series)
- The Pig and Whistle (1967–1977)
- Question Period (1967–present, news program)
- Reach for the Top (1961–1985)
- Singalong Jubilee (1961–1974)
- Take 30 (1962–1983)
- The Tommy Hunter Show (1965–1992)
- University of the Air (1966–1983)
- W-FIVE (1966–present, newsmagazine program)

=== 1970s ===
- Anything You Can Do (1971–1974)
- Bandwagon with Bob Francis (1972–1975)
- The Beachcombers (1972–1990)
- Canada AM (1972–present, news program)
- Drop-In (1970–1974)
- Dr. Simon Locke (1971–1974)
- Headline Hunters (1972–1983)
- Marketplace (1972–present, newsmagazine program)
- Polka Dot Door (1971-1993)
- This Is the Law (1971–1976)
- This Land (1970–1982)

== Networks and services ==
=== Network launches ===
Network	Type	Launch	Notes
CBC Northern Service	Over-the-air and cable and satellite	Unknown date	CBC's northern television service was launched to provide television service to Canada's northern territories, delivered by satellite to cable and satellite television systems and community-owned low-powered television stations. CFYK-TV in Yellowknife, Northwest Territories serves as the production centre of local news programs on the CBC North service.

== Television stations ==
=== Debuts ===
Date	Market	Station	Channel	Affiliation	Notes/References
March 23	Toronto, Ontario	CBLFT	25	Radio-Canada (O&O)	
June 30	Calgary, Alberta	Access	(cable-only)	Educational independent	
October 23	Sept-Îles, Quebec	CBST	13	Radio Canada	

== Births ==
Date	Name	Notability
January 14	Katie Griffin	Voice actress (Sailor Moon, Totally Spies!)
February 12	Tara Strong	Canadian-American voice actress (The Powerpuff Girls), (The Fairly OddParents) and (My Little Pony: Friendship is Magic)
November 9	Alyson Court	Actress (The Big Comfy Couch)

== See also ==
- 1972 in Canada
- List of Canadian films
