= 1958 in Canadian television =

The following is a list of events affecting Canadian television in 1958. Events listed include television show debuts, finales, cancellations, and channel launches.

== Notable events ==
- The Board of Broadcast Governors (BBG) was established to be the “watchdog” of Canadian broadcasting under the new Broadcasting Act of 1958. The formation of the BBG, prompted by public demand for alternative programming choices, led to the establishment of “second” television stations in eight cities across the country.
- The CBC's first live coast-to-coast live television broadcast was aired after the cross-country microwave network was completed thanks to the cooperation with Bell Media, opening 6,400 kilometres (4,000 mi) worth of microwave links carrying television signals, teletype messages, and telephone calls.

== Births ==
Date	Name	Notability
January 10	Terrence Scammell	Voice actor
September 8	Stevie Vallance	Voice actress (Madeline)

== Television shows ==
=== Debuts ===
- Canadian Bandstand (1958–19??, CKCO-TV)
- March 30 - The Friendly Giant (1958-1985, CBC)
- Wayne and Shuster Show (1958–1989, CBC)

=== Programs on-air this year ===
- Country Canada (1954-2007)
- CBC News Magazine (1952-1981)
- The National (1954–present)
- The C.G.E. Show (1952-1959)
- Circle 8 Ranch (1955-1978)
- The Friendly Giant (1958-1985)
- Front Page Challenge (1957-1995)
- Hockey Night in Canada (1952–present)
- Maggie Muggins (1955–1962)
- Open House (1952-1962)
- Wayne and Shuster Show (1958-1989)

== Television stations ==
=== Debuts ===
Date	Market	Station	Channel	Affiliation	Ref./Notes
January 27	Prince Albert, Saskatchewan	CKBI-TV	5	CBC Television	
April 15	Trois-Rivieres, Quebec	CKTM-TV	13	Radio-Canada	
June 19	Yorkton, Saskatchewan	CKOS-TV	3	CBC Television	
August 19	Matane, Quebec	CKBL-TV	6	Radio Canada	Now CBGAT

== See also ==
- 1958 in Canada
- 1958 in television
