= 1954 in Canada =

- Decades: 1930s; 1940s; 1950s; 1960s; 1970s
- See also: History of Canada; Timeline of Canadian history; List of years in Canada

Events from the year 1954 in Canada.

== Incumbents ==
=== Crown ===
- Monarch – Elizabeth II

=== Federal government ===
- Governor General – Vincent Massey
- Prime Minister – Louis St. Laurent
- Chief Justice – Thibaudeau Rinfret (Quebec) (until 22 June) then Patrick Kerwin (Ontario)
- Parliament – 22nd

=== Provincial governments ===
==== Lieutenant governors ====
- Lieutenant Governor of Alberta – John J. Bowlen
- Lieutenant Governor of British Columbia – Clarence Wallace
- Lieutenant Governor of Manitoba – John Stewart McDiarmid
- Lieutenant Governor of New Brunswick – David Laurence MacLaren
- Lieutenant Governor of Newfoundland – Leonard Outerbridge
- Lieutenant Governor of Nova Scotia – Alistair Fraser
- Lieutenant Governor of Ontario – Louis Orville Breithaupt
- Lieutenant Governor of Prince Edward Island – Thomas William Lemuel Prowse
- Lieutenant Governor of Quebec – Gaspard Fauteux
- Lieutenant Governor of Saskatchewan – William John Patterson

==== Premiers ====
- Premier of Alberta – Ernest Manning
- Premier of British Columbia – W.A.C. Bennett
- Premier of Manitoba – Douglas Campbell
- Premier of New Brunswick – Hugh John Flemming
- Premier of Newfoundland – Joey Smallwood
- Premier of Nova Scotia – Angus Macdonald (until April 13) then Harold Connolly (April 13 to September 30) then Henry Hicks
- Premier of Ontario – Leslie Frost
- Premier of Prince Edward Island – Alex Matheson
- Premier of Quebec – Maurice Duplessis
- Premier of Saskatchewan – Tommy Douglas

=== Territorial governments ===
==== Commissioners ====
- Commissioner of Yukon – Wilfred George Brown
- Commissioner of Northwest Territories – Robert Gordon Robertson

== Events ==
- January 1 – Metropolitan Toronto comes into being to coordinate services among the various municipalities around Toronto.
- January 8 – The first oil from Alberta arrives in Sarnia through the new pipeline
- March 30 – The Yonge St. subway, the first subway system in Canada, opens in Toronto
- April 13 – Angus Lewis Macdonald, Premier of Nova Scotia, dies in office
- April 14 – Harold Connolly becomes premier of Nova Scotia
- May 31 – Winnipeg's first television station, CBWT a CBC Television owned and operated station, begins broadcasting
- August 10 – The groundbreaking ceremony for the St. Lawrence Seaway begins
- September 9 - The 1954 Series of banknotes is introduced.
- September 9 – Marilyn Bell becomes the first person to swim Lake Ontario
- September 18 – Marie-Victorin Statue unveiled
- September 30 – Henry Hicks becomes premier of Nova Scotia, replacing Harold Connolly
- October 15 – Hurricane Hazel hits Toronto killing 81.

=== Full date unknown ===
- Canada contributes to a peacekeeping force in Indochina
- Sir Adam Beck Generating Station built on the Canadian side of the Niagara River
- Pinetree Line radar system completed
- Yahtzee is invented by a Canadian couple
- Jean Drapeau first elected mayor of Montreal
- Streetcars leave Winnipeg

== Arts and literature ==
=== New books ===
- Mordecai Richler – The Acrobats
- Gabrielle Roy – Alexandre Chenevert
- Igor Gouzenko – The Fall of a Titan

=== Awards ===
- See 1954 Governor General's Awards for a complete list of winners and finalists for those awards.
- Stephen Leacock Award: Joan Walker, Pardon My Parka

== Sport ==
- April 16 – The Detroit Red Wings win their sixth Stanley Cup by defeating the Montreal Canadiens 4 games to 3.
- May 16 – The Ontario Hockey Association's St. Catharines Teepees win their first Memorial Cup by defeating the Central Alberta Hockey League's Edmonton Oil Kings 4 games to 0 (with 1 tie). All games were played at Maple Leaf Gardens in Toronto
- July 30 – The Miracle Mile is run at the British Empire and Commonwealth Games in Vancouver. Empire Stadium is opened on the same day.
- August 28 – The BC Lions are established, the fifth team in the Western Interprovincial Football Union.
- November 27 – The Edmonton Eskimos win their first Grey Cup by defeating the Montreal Alouettes 26 to 25 in the 42nd Grey Cup played at Varsity Stadium in Toronto

== Births ==
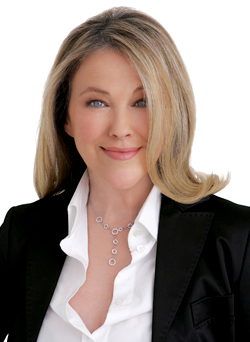
Catherine O'Hara photographed by Jerry Avenaim, 2005

=== January to June ===
- January 11 – Jim Wych, snooker player and sports announcer
- January 29 – Doug Risebrough, ice hockey player and coach

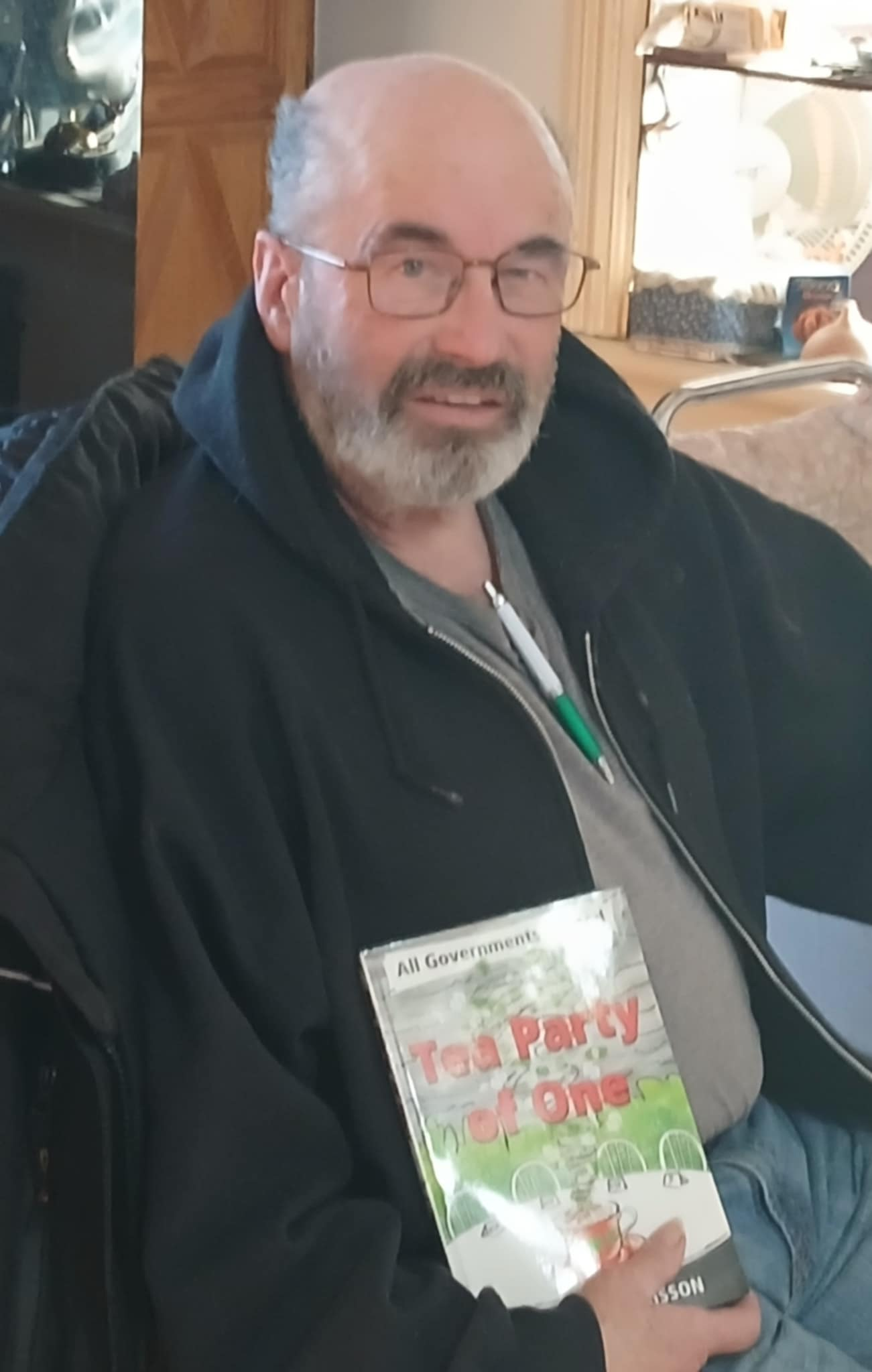
Jean-Serge Brisson in 2025, with his English-language book Tea Party of One: All Governments Invited which was published in 2014.

- February 3 – Tiger Williams, ice hockey player
- February 24 – Sid Meier, Canadian-American programmer
- March 2 – Ed Johnstone, ice hockey player
- March 4 – Catherine O'Hara, actress (d. 2026)
- April 5 - Claude-André Lachance, politician and son of Georges-C. Lachance
- April 7 – Clark Gillies, ice hockey player (d. 2022)
- April 17 – Roddy Piper, wrestler and actor (d. 2015)
- April 20 – Gilles Lupien, ice hockey player and agent (d. 2021)
- May 4 – Sylvia Burka, ice speed skater and World Champion, cyclist
- May 10 – Eleni Bakopanos, politician
- May 13 – David Bissett, field hockey player
- May 14 – Danny Gare, ice hockey player
- May 16 – Dafydd Williams, physician and astronaut
- May 26 – Aritha Van Herk, writer, critic, editor and university professor
- May 28 – John Tory, businessman, politician and broadcaster
- June 3 – Wally Weir, Canadian ice hockey player
- June 28 – Jean-Serge Brisson, author and politician

=== July to December ===
- July 6 – Brian Pallister, politician
- July 9 – Kevin O'Leary, businessman, television personality, and political candidate
- July 18 – Audrey Vandervelden, volleyball player
- August 11 – Gulzar Singh Cheema, politician

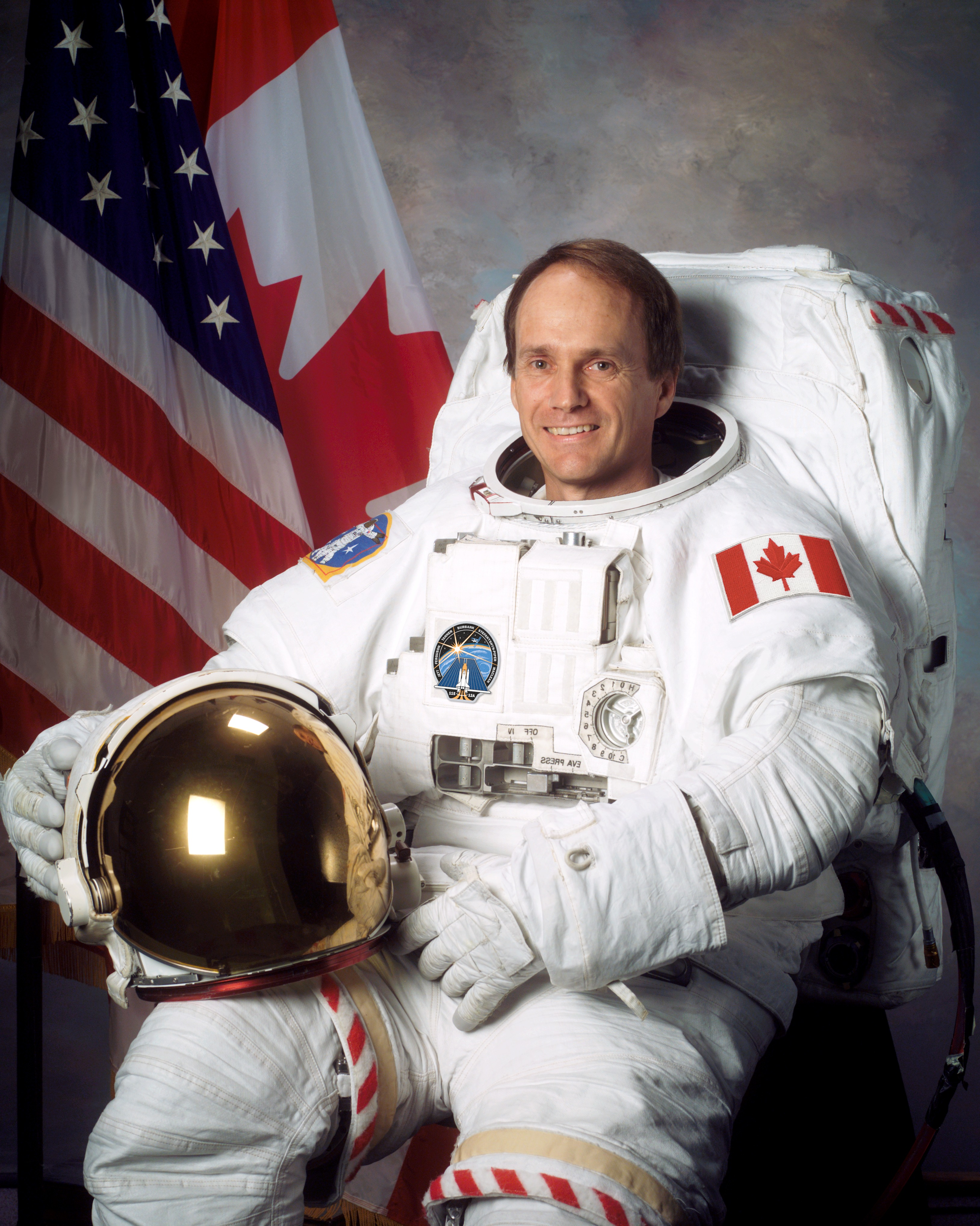
Steven MacLean

- August 16 – James Cameron, film director, producer and screenwriter
- September 3 – Avis Gray, politician
- September 18 – Steven Pinker, cognitive psychologist
- September 26 – Don Irvine, sprint canoer
- October 21 – Brian Tobin, politician
- November 7 – Guy Gavriel Kay, fantasy fiction author
- November 12 – Dave Edge, long-distance runner
- November 24 – Stuart Murray, politician
- December 14 – Steven MacLean, astronaut
- December 20 – John Kinch, football player (d. 2022)
- December 28 – Lanny Poffo, wrestler (d. 2023)

=== Full date unknown ===
- Alan Kane, author
- Jim St. James, actor and HIV/AIDS activist

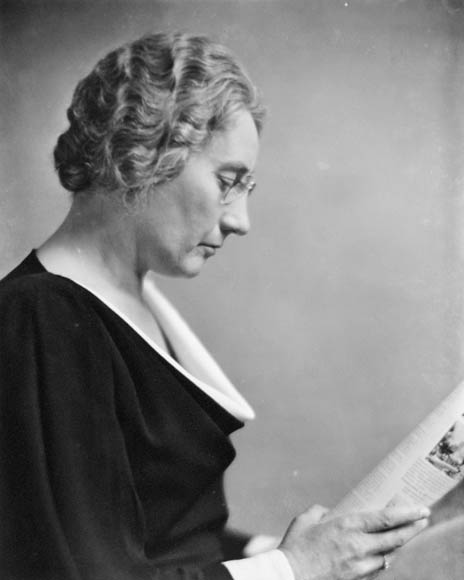
Agnes Macphail

== Deaths ==
- January 24 – H. H. Wrong, diplomat (b. 1894)
- February 13 – Agnes Macphail, politician, first woman to be elected to the House of Commons of Canada (b. 1890)
- March 15 – Charles MacOdrum, politician
- March 31 – John Walter Jones, politician and Premier of Prince Edward Island (b. 1878)
- April 4 – Abraham Albert Heaps, politician and labor leader (b. 1885)
- April 8 – Winnifred Eaton, author (b. 1875)
- April 13 – Angus Lewis Macdonald, lawyer, law professor, politician and 19th Premier of Nova Scotia (b. 1890)
- June 18 – Welland Gemmell, politician and minister
- June 21 – Rod Keller, general (b. 1900)
- August 6 – Emilie Dionne, one of the Dionne Quintuplets (b. 1934)
- November 26 – Wallace Rupert Turnbull, engineer and inventor (b. 1870)

=== Full date unknown ===
- James Endicott, church leader and missionary (b. 1865)

== See also ==
- 1954 in Canadian television
- List of Canadian films
