= 1953 in Canada =

- Decades: 1930s; 1940s; 1950s; 1960s; 1970s
- See also: History of Canada; Timeline of Canadian history; List of years in Canada

Events from the year 1953 in Canada.

== Incumbents ==
=== Crown ===
- Monarch – Elizabeth II

=== Federal government ===
- Governor General – Vincent Massey
- Prime Minister – Louis St. Laurent
- Chief Justice – Thibaudeau Rinfret (Quebec)
- Parliament – 21st (until 13 June) then 22nd (from 12 November)

=== Provincial governments ===
==== Lieutenant governors ====
- Lieutenant Governor of Alberta – John J. Bowlen
- Lieutenant Governor of British Columbia – Clarence Wallace
- Lieutenant Governor of Manitoba – Roland Fairbairn McWilliams (until August 1) then John Stewart McDiarmid
- Lieutenant Governor of New Brunswick – David Laurence MacLaren
- Lieutenant Governor of Newfoundland – Leonard Outerbridge
- Lieutenant Governor of Nova Scotia – Alistair Fraser
- Lieutenant Governor of Ontario – Louis Orville Breithaupt
- Lieutenant Governor of Prince Edward Island – Thomas William Lemuel Prowse
- Lieutenant Governor of Quebec – Gaspard Fauteux
- Lieutenant Governor of Saskatchewan – William John Patterson

==== Premiers ====
- Premier of Alberta – Ernest Manning
- Premier of British Columbia – W.A.C. Bennett
- Premier of Manitoba – Douglas Campbell
- Premier of New Brunswick – Hugh John Flemming
- Premier of Newfoundland – Joey Smallwood
- Premier of Nova Scotia – Angus Macdonald
- Premier of Ontario – Leslie Frost
- Premier of Prince Edward Island – J. Walter Jones (until May 25) then Alex Matheson
- Premier of Quebec – Maurice Duplessis
- Premier of Saskatchewan – Tommy Douglas

=== Territorial governments ===
==== Commissioners ====
- Commissioner of Yukon – Wilfred George Brown
- Commissioner of Northwest Territories – Hugh Andrew Young (until November 15) then Robert Gordon Robertson

== Events ==
- January 1 – The National Library of Canada is founded.
- January 9 – Marguerite Pitre becomes the thirteenth, and last, woman hanged in Canada when she is executed in Montréal.
- January 27 – The Canadian Dental Association approves the use of fluoride in drinking water
- May 25 – Alex Matheson becomes premier of Prince Edward Island, replacing J. Walter Jones
- June 2 – Elizabeth II is crowned Queen of Canada. In Korea the Canadian Army celebrates the coronation by firing red, white, and blue smoke shells at the enemy.
- July 13 – The Stratford Festival of Canada opens
- July 27 – The Korean War ends. In total 314 Canadians were killed and 1211 wounded.
- August 10 – Federal election: Louis Saint Laurent's Liberals win a fifth consecutive majority.
- October 12 – Wilfrid Laurier Memorial unveiled
- October 15 – The Trans Mountain Oil Pipeline is completed
- October 25 – Canada's first privately owned television station, CKSO, broadcasts in Sudbury.
- The federal Immigration Act is amended to prohibit homosexuals entry into Canada. This amendment was repealed in 1977.

== Arts and literature ==
=== Awards ===
- See 1953 Governor General's Awards for a complete list of winners and finalists for those awards.
- Stephen Leacock Award: Lawrence Earl, The Battle of Baltinglass

== Sport ==
- April 16 – The Montreal Canadiens win their seventh Stanley Cup by defeating the Boston Bruins 4 games to 1. The deciding Game 5 was played at the Montreal Forum
- May 6 – The Ontario Hockey Association's Barrie Flyers win their second Memorial Cup by defeating the Manitoba Junior Hockey League's St. Boniface Canadiens 4 games to 1. The deciding Game 5 was played at Wheat City Arena in Brandon, Manitoba
- November 28 – The Hamilton Tiger-Cats win their first Grey Cup by defeating the Winnipeg Blue Bombers 12–6 in the 41st Grey Cup played at Toronto's Varsity Stadium

== Births ==
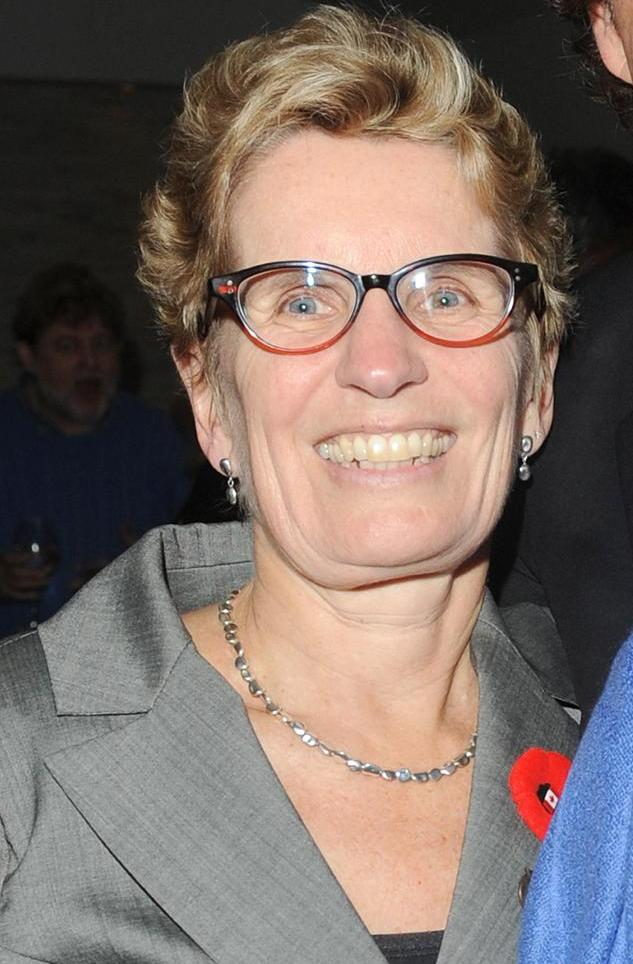
Kathleen Wynne

=== January to June ===
- January 7
  - Dionne Brand, poet, novelist and non-fiction writer
  - Morris Titanic, ice hockey player and coach
- January 19 – Richard Legendre, tennis player and politician
- January 29 – Pierre Jacob, politician
- February 5 – Eric Robinson, politician
- February 15
  - David Chomiak, politician
  - Gerald Keddy, politician
- February 16 – Lanny McDonald, ice hockey player
- February 17 – Borys Chambul, discus thrower
- February 18 – Robbie Bachman, drummer (d. 2023)
- February 20 – Gaëtan Dugas, early AIDS patient who was incorrectly identified as the "Patient Zero" who brought the epidemic to the United States (d.1984)
- March 10 – Debbie Brill, high jumper
- March 13 – Stephanie Berto, track and field athlete
- March 17 – Lewis Camden, politician
- April 2 – Janet Nutter, diver
- April 17 – Dany Laferrière, novelist and journalist
- April 18 – Rick Moranis, comedian, actor and musician
- May 11 – Celine Lomez, actress and singer
- May 14 – Tom Cochrane, singer-songwriter and musician
- May 21 - Kathleen Wynne, 25th premier of Ontario
- June 23
  - Raymonde April, photographer
  - Albina Guarnieri, politician and Minister

=== July to September ===
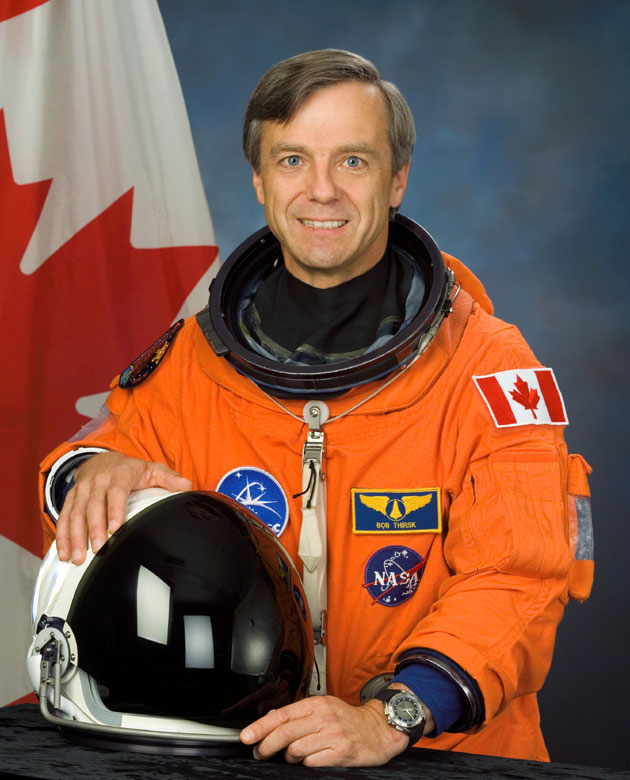
Robert Thirsk

- July 3 – Dave Lewis, ice hockey player and coach
- July 9 – Margie Gillis, dancer and choreographer
- July 15
  - Richard Margison, operatic tenor
  - Mila Mulroney, wife of the 18th Prime Minister of Canada, Brian Mulroney
- July 22 – Paul Quarrington, novelist, playwright, screenwriter, filmmaker and musician
- July 25 – Barbara Haworth-Attard, children's author
- July 29 – Geddy Lee, singer, bassist and keyboardist
- August 11 – Greg Duhaime, middle-distance runner
- August 17 – Robert Thirsk, engineer and astronaut
- August 27 – Alex Lifeson, guitarist
- September 16 – Nancy Huston, novelist and essayist
- September 29 - Jean-Claude Lauzon, Quebec filmmaker (d. 1997)
- September 30 – S. M. Stirling, science fiction and fantasy author

=== October to December ===
- October 7 – Linda Griffiths, actress and playwright (d.2014)
- October 12 – Daniel Louis, film producer
- October 14 – Debbie Nightingale, film and television producer
- October 24
  - Charles Colbourn, computer scientist and mathematician
  - Jim Pettie, ice hockey player (d.2019)
- October 29 – Denis Potvin, ice hockey player
- November 7 – Lynne Naylor, designer, animator, director, and producer
- November 26 – Pam Barrett, politician (d.2008)
- November 28 – John Majhor, radio and television host (d.2007)
- December 7 – Carmen Rinke, boxer
- December 13 – Bob Gainey, ice hockey player and coach
- December 18 – Daniel Poliquin, novelist and translator
- December 23 – Holly Dale, film and television director and film producer

== Deaths ==
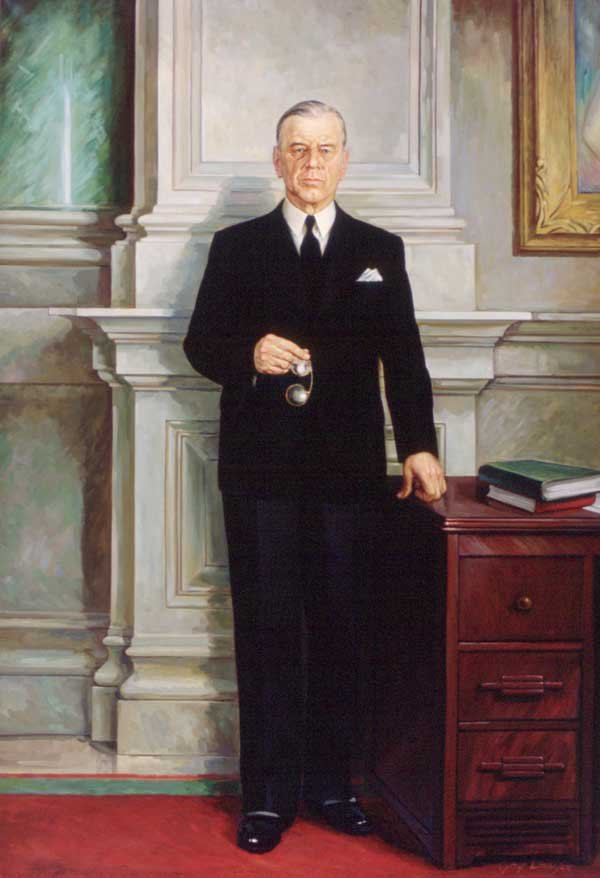
Gordon Daniel Conant

- January 2 – Gordon Daniel Conant, lawyer, politician and 12th Premier of Ontario (b.1885)
- January 5 – Mitchell Hepburn, politician and 11th Premier of Ontario (b.1896)
- February 16 – Norman Hipel, politician and Minister (b.1890)
- March 20 – John Livingstone Brown, politician (b.1867)

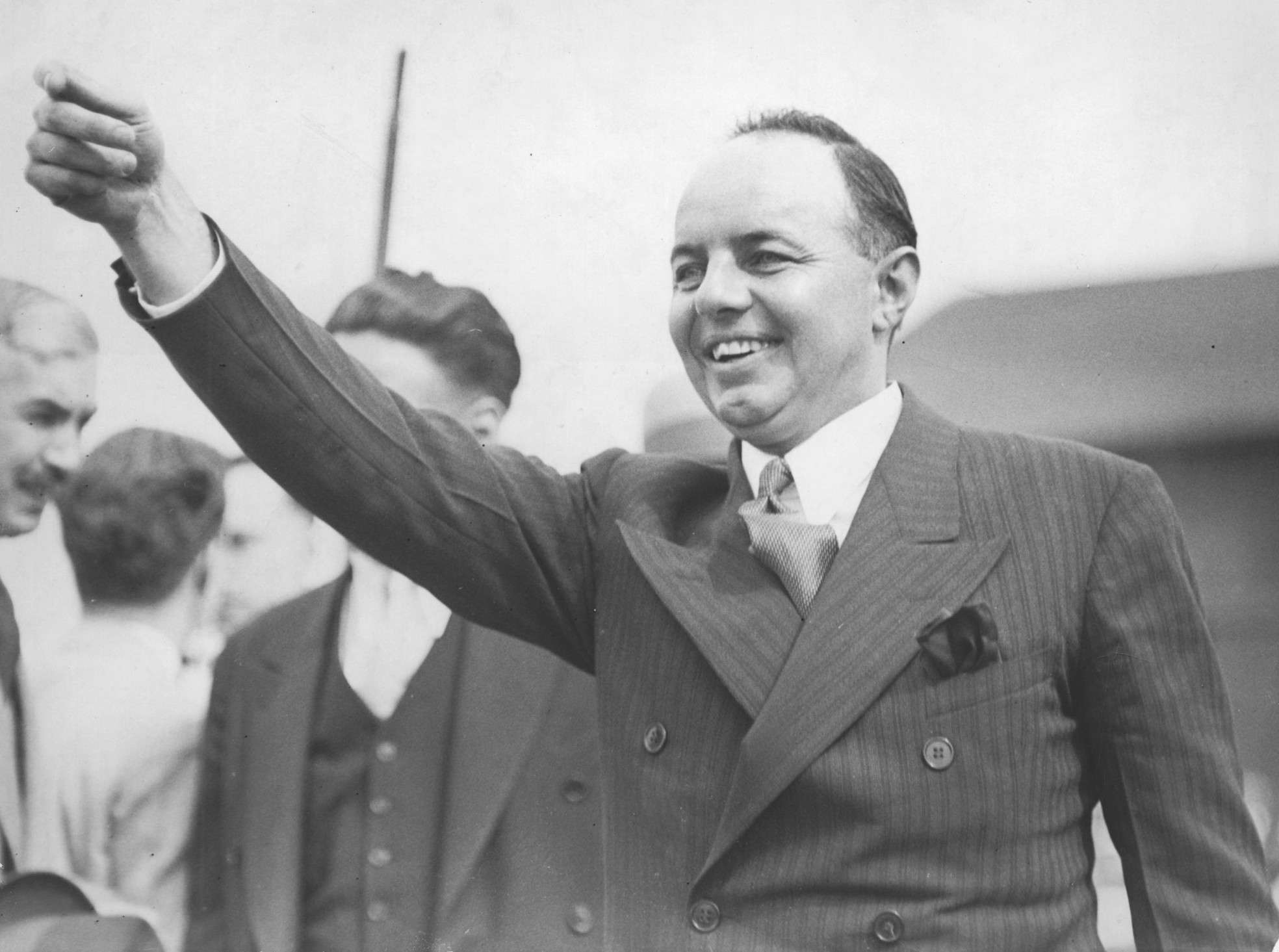
Mitchell Hepburn

- May 4 – James Tompkins, priest and educator (b.1870)
- September 19 – Gordon Graydon, politician (b.1897)
- November 29 – Sam De Grasse, actor (b.1875)
- December 26 – David Milne, painter, printmaker and writer (b.1882)

== See also ==
- 1953 in Canadian television
- List of Canadian films
