= 1957 in Canada =

- Decades: 1930s; 1940s; 1950s; 1960s; 1970s
- See also: History of Canada; Timeline of Canadian history; List of years in Canada

Events from the year 1957 in Canada.

== Incumbents ==
=== Crown ===
- Monarch – Elizabeth II

=== Federal government ===
- Governor General – Vincent Massey
- Prime Minister – Louis St. Laurent (until June 21) then John Diefenbaker
- Chief Justice – Patrick Kerwin (Ontario)
- Parliament – 22nd (until 12 April) then 23rd (from 14 October)

=== Provincial governments ===
==== Lieutenant governors ====
- Lieutenant Governor of Alberta – John J. Bowlen
- Lieutenant Governor of British Columbia – Frank Mackenzie Ross
- Lieutenant Governor of Manitoba – John Stewart McDiarmid
- Lieutenant Governor of New Brunswick – David Laurence MacLaren
- Lieutenant Governor of Newfoundland – Leonard Outerbridge (until December 16) then Campbell Leonard Macpherson
- Lieutenant Governor of Nova Scotia – Alistair Fraser
- Lieutenant Governor of Ontario – Louis Orville Breithaupt (until December 30) then John Keiller MacKay
- Lieutenant Governor of Prince Edward Island – Thomas William Lemuel Prowse
- Lieutenant Governor of Quebec – Gaspard Fauteux
- Lieutenant Governor of Saskatchewan – William John Patterson

==== Premiers ====
- Premier of Alberta – Ernest Manning
- Premier of British Columbia – W.A.C. Bennett
- Premier of Manitoba – Douglas Campbell
- Premier of New Brunswick – Hugh John Flemming
- Premier of Newfoundland – Joey Smallwood
- Premier of Nova Scotia – Robert Stanfield
- Premier of Ontario – Leslie Frost
- Premier of Prince Edward Island – Alex Matheson
- Premier of Quebec – Maurice Duplessis
- Premier of Saskatchewan – Tommy Douglas

=== Territorial governments ===
==== Commissioners ====
- Commissioner of Yukon – Frederick Howard Collins
- Commissioner of Northwest Territories – Robert Gordon Robertson

== Events ==
- January 1 – The first Canadian peacekeepers arrive in Egypt after the Suez Crisis
- January 17 – HMCS Bonaventure, Canada's third and last aircraft carrier, is commissioned
- March 6 – Quebec's Padlock Law is ruled unconstitutional
- March 20 – The seven-month-long Murdochville Strike begins
- March 28 – The Canada Council is established
- April 2 – Elvis Presley performs in Maple Leaf Gardens in Toronto.
- April 3 – Elvis Presley performs in Ottawa.
- April 15 - White Rock secedes from Surrey, British Columbia, following a referendum.
- April 27 - The SS Moyie takes her final voyage.
- June 10 – Federal election: John Diefenbaker's PCs win a minority, defeating Louis Saint Laurent's Liberals
- June 21 – John Diefenbaker becomes prime minister, replacing Louis Saint Laurent
- July 31 – The DEW Line begins operation
- August 31 – Elvis Presley performs at Empire Stadium in Vancouver.
- September 12 – Canada and the United States sign the NORAD agreement
- October 4 – The first prototype Avro Arrow is presented to the media. The rollout is completely overshadowed by the flight of Sputnik I the same day.
- October 12 – Foreign Minister Lester B. Pearson wins the Nobel Peace Prize for his work on the Suez Crisis
- October 14:
  - Elizabeth II opens the Canadian parliament, the first monarch to do so
  - Thanksgiving is moved to its current date, the second Monday in October
- Equalization payments are established.

== Sport ==
- April 16 – The Montreal Canadiens win their ninth Stanley Cup by defeating the Boston Bruins 4 games to 1. The deciding Game 5 was played at the Montreal Forum
- May 6 – The Saskatchewan Junior Hockey League's Flin Flon Bombers win their only Memorial Cup by defeating the independent Ottawa-Hull Canadiens 4 games to 3. The deciding Game 7 was played at the Regina Exhibition Stadium
- June 14 – Édouard Carpentier (Édouard Ignacz Weiczorkiewicz) defeats Lou Thesz to become the 2nd Canadian NWA World Heavyweight Champion
- November 30 – The Hamilton Tiger-Cats win their 2nd Grey Cup by defeating the Winnipeg Blue Bombers 32–7 in the 45th Grey Cup at Varsity Stadium in Toronto

== Arts and literature ==
=== New works ===
- F. R. Scott – The Eye of the Needle: Satire, Sorties, Sundries
- Mordecai Richler – A Choice of Enemies
- W.L. Morton – Manitoba: The Birth of a Province
- Farley Mowat – The Dog Who Wouldn't Be
- Northrop Frye – Anatomy of Criticism

=== Awards ===
- See 1957 Governor General's Awards for a complete list of winners and finalists for those awards.
- Stephen Leacock Award: Robert Thomas Allen The Grass Is Never Greener

=== Television ===
- Front Page Challenge premiers on CBC

== Births ==
=== January to June ===
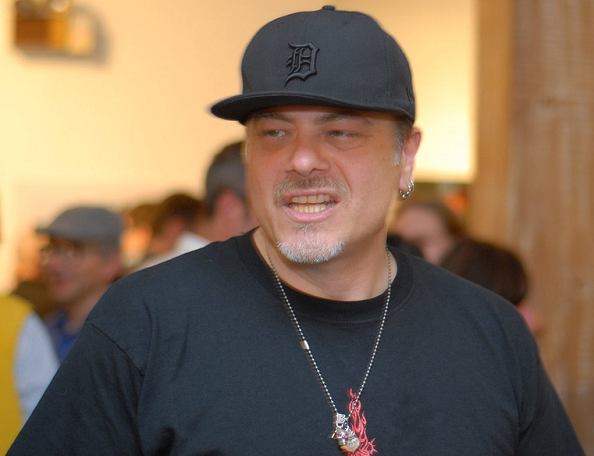
Danny Antonucci

- January 8 - Wendy Mesley, broadcast journalist
- January 22 – Mike Bossy, ice hockey player (d. 2022)
- January 28 – Michael Baker, politician (d. 2009)
- February 17 – Loreena McKennitt, singer, composer, harpist and pianist
- February 27 – Danny Antonucci, animator, director and writer
- March 10 – Shannon Tweed, actress
- March 24 - Olivia Chow, politician and widow of Jack Layton
- April 20 – Bryan Illerbrun, football player (d. 2013)
- April 29 – Leona Dombrowsky, politician
- May 4 – Kathy Kreiner, alpine skier and Olympic gold medallist
- May 14 – Gilles Bisson, politician
- May 17 – Todd Hardy, leader of the Yukon New Democratic Party (d. 2010)
- May 19 – Helen Branswell, health journalist (d. 2026)
- June 12
  - Mike Bullard, comedian and broadcaster (d. 2024)
  - Benedict Campbell, actor
- June 28 – Lance Nethery, ice hockey player

=== July to September ===
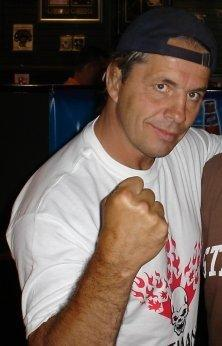
Bret Hart

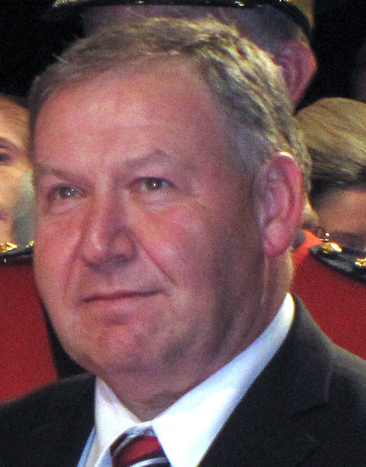
Darrell Dexter

- July 2 – Bret Hart, wrestler and actor
- July 6 – Ron Duguay, Canadian ice hockey player and coach
- July 9 – George Nagy, swimmer
- July 15 – Craig Martin, soccer player and coach
- July 22 - Michèle Dionne, wife of Jean Charest, 29th Prime Minister of Quebec
- July 26 – Mark Paré, National Hockey League linesman
- August 6 – Francesca Gagnon, singer
- August 11 – Tony Valeri, politician
- August 15 – David L. Anderson, politician
- August 15 - Richard Ayres, Business owner, Mechanic, Carpenter, Great Father
- August 16 – Mark Evans, rower and Olympic gold medallist
- August 16 – J. Michael Evans, rower and Olympic gold medallist
- August 20 – Cindy Nicholas, athlete and politician
- August 23 – Georges Farrah, politician
- August 26 – Rick Hansen, paraplegic athlete and activist for people with spinal cord injuries
- September 10 – Darrell Dexter, politician and 27th Premier of Nova Scotia
- September 23 – Sylvie Garant, model

=== October to December ===
- October 9 – Art Boileau, long-distance runner
- October 26 – Glen Murray, politician
- October 30 – Joseph Cordiano, politician and Minister
- November 12 – Andrée A. Michaud, writer
- November 16 – Ferg Hawke, ultra-distance runner
- November 18 – Kim Rudd, politician and businesswoman (d. 2024)
- November 20 – Sophie Lorain, actress, director and producer
- November 22 – Glen Clark, politician and 31st Premier of British Columbia
- November 30 – Colin Mochrie, comedian and actor
- December 4 – Rob Shick, ice hockey referee
- December 5 – Paul Steele, rower and Olympic gold medallist
- December 6 – Louis Jani, judoka
- December 12 – Robert Lepage, playwright, actor and film director
- December 31 – Sonya Biddle, actress and politician (d. 2022)

=== Full date unknown ===
- Daniel J. Caron, national librarian of Library and Archives Canada
- Robert Poulin, murderer responsible for the St. Pius X High School shooting (d. 1975)
- Nancy Richler, novelist

== Deaths ==
- January 16 – Alexander Cambridge, 1st Earl of Athlone, 16th Governor General of Canada (b. 1874)
- August 21 – Nels Stewart, ice hockey player (b. 1902)
- August 26 – Joseph Tyrrell, geologist, cartographer and mining consultant (b. 1858)
- October 21 – Arthur Puttee, politician (b. 1868)
- October 31 – Martha Black, politician and the second woman elected to the House of Commons of Canada (b. 1866)
- December 10 – Roland Fairbairn McWilliams, politician and Lieutenant-Governor of Manitoba (b. 1874)
- December 29 – Humphrey T. Walwyn, naval officer and Governor of Newfoundland (b. 1879)

== See also ==
- 1957 in Canadian television
- List of Canadian films
