= 1966 in Canadian television =

The following is a list of events affecting Canadian television in 1966. Events listed include television show debuts, finales, cancellations, and channel launches, closures and rebrandings.

== Events ==
Date	Event
	Hamilton, Ontario media proprietor Ken Soble files the original application for what will, after his death and numerous follow-up revisions to the application, eventually become the Global Television Network in 1974.
May 6	The 1966 Canadian Film Awards.
May 8	Controversial newsmagazine This Hour Has Seven Days airs its last show after fifty episodes and two seasons.
September 1	CBC becomes the first Canadian television network to broadcast in colour. That same day, local Montreal tv station CFTM-TV commences broadcasting activity in color. Two weeks later CTV changes over to colour as well.
September 11	Long-running investigation program W5 begins airing. It quickly becomes the most popular program on CTV.
September 11	Shaw Communications is founded as Capital Cable Television Co. Ltd. in Edmonton, Alberta.

=== Debuts ===
Show	Station	Premiere Date
Charlie Had One But He Didn't Like It, So He Gave It To Us	CBC Television	July 20
Wojeck	CBC Television	September 13
W5	CTV	October 3
University of the Air	CTV	Unknown
Rocket Robin Hood	syndication	Unknown

=== Ending this year ===
Show	Station	Cancelled
This Hour Has Seven Days	CBC Television	May 8
Razzle Dazzle	CBC Television	July 1
Seaway	CBC Television	September 8

== Television shows ==
=== 1950s ===
- Country Canada (1954–2007)
- CBC News Magazine (1952–1981)
- Chez Hélène (1959–1973)
- Circle 8 Ranch (1955–1978)
- Don Messer's Jubilee (1957–1969)
- The Friendly Giant (1958–1985)
- Hockey Night in Canada (1952–present)
- The National (1954–present)
- Front Page Challenge (1957–1995)
- Wayne and Shuster Show (1958–1989)

=== 1960s ===
- 20/20 (1962-1967)
- Butternut Square (1964-1967)
- Canada 98 (1964-1967)
- Cariboo Country (1960, 1964–1967)
- CTV National News (1961–present)
- Elwood Glover's Luncheon Date (1963–1975)
- Flashbook (1962-1968)
- Land and Sea (1964–present)
- Let's Go (1964-1968)
- Magistrate's Court (1963–1969)
- Music Hop (1962–1972)
- The Nature of Things (1960–present, scientific documentary series)
- People in Conflict (1962–1970)
- The Pierre Berton Show (1962-1973)
- Quentin Durgens, M.P. (1965–1969)
- Reach for the Top (1961–1985)
- Singalong Jubilee (1961–1974)
- Take 30 (1962–1983)
- Telescope (1963–1973)
- The Tommy Hunter Show (1965–1992)

== Births ==
Date	Name	Notability
February 20	Louis Ferreira	Actor
November 15	Evan Adams	Actor, playwright

== See also ==
- 1966 in Canada
- List of Canadian films
