= 1956 in Canada =

- Decades: 1930s; 1940s; 1950s; 1960s; 1970s
- See also: History of Canada; Timeline of Canadian history; List of years in Canada

Events from the year 1956 in Canada.

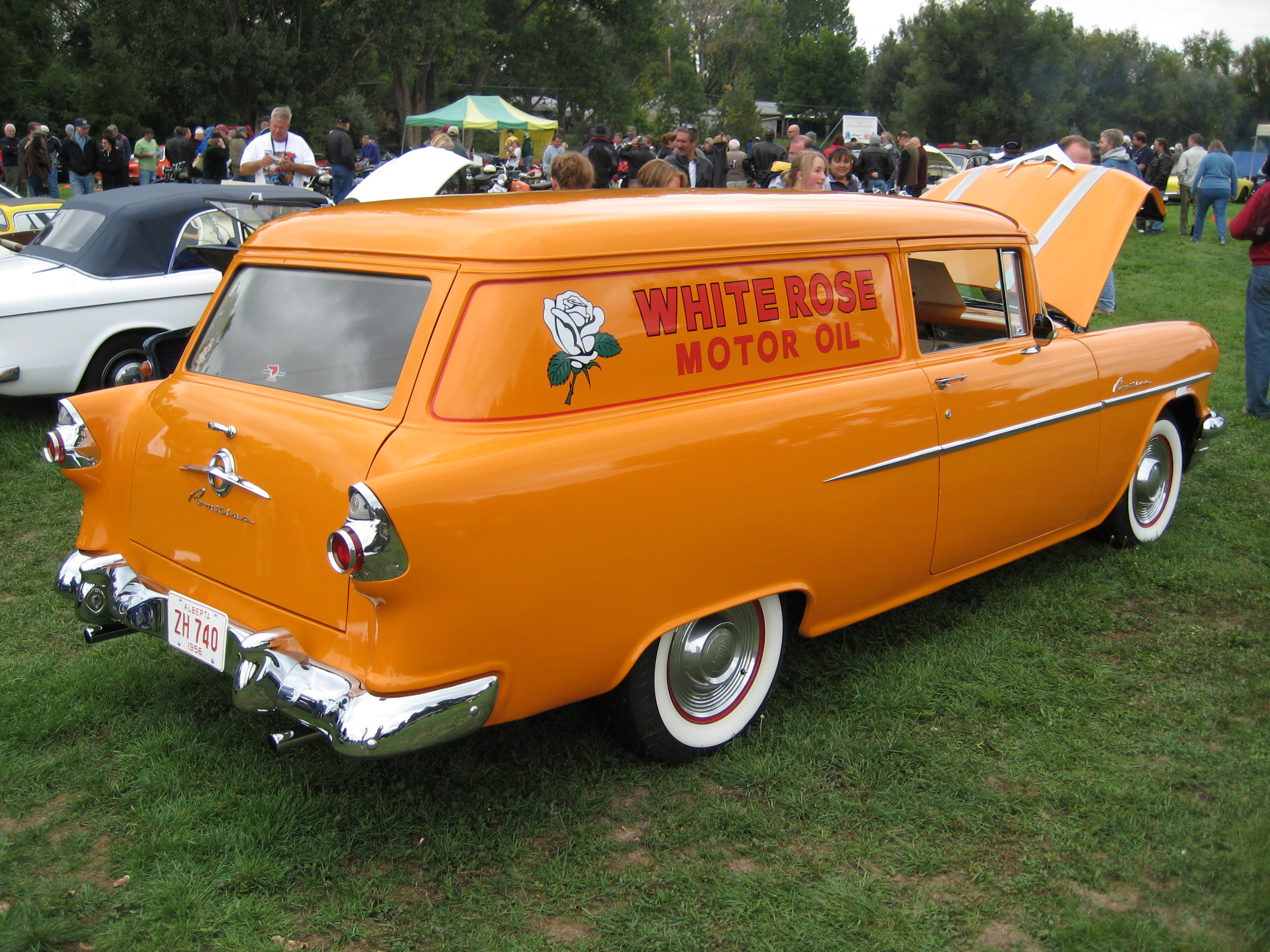
1956 Canadian Pontiac Pathfinder Sedan Delivery. Like all Canadian-built Pontiacs of the era, built on a Chevrolet chassis, with Chevrolet engines.

== Incumbents ==
=== Crown ===
- Monarch – Elizabeth II

=== Federal government ===
- Governor General – Vincent Massey
- Prime Minister – Louis St. Laurent
- Chief Justice – Patrick Kerwin (Ontario)
- Parliament – 22nd

=== Provincial governments ===
==== Lieutenant governors ====
- Lieutenant Governor of Alberta – John J. Bowlen
- Lieutenant Governor of British Columbia – Frank Mackenzie Ross
- Lieutenant Governor of Manitoba – John Stewart McDiarmid
- Lieutenant Governor of New Brunswick – David Laurence MacLaren
- Lieutenant Governor of Newfoundland – Leonard Outerbridge
- Lieutenant Governor of Nova Scotia – Alistair Fraser
- Lieutenant Governor of Ontario – Louis Orville Breithaupt
- Lieutenant Governor of Prince Edward Island – Thomas William Lemuel Prowse
- Lieutenant Governor of Quebec – Gaspard Fauteux
- Lieutenant Governor of Saskatchewan – William John Patterson

==== Premiers ====
- Premier of Alberta – Ernest Manning
- Premier of British Columbia – W.A.C. Bennett
- Premier of Manitoba – Douglas Campbell
- Premier of New Brunswick – Hugh John Flemming
- Premier of Newfoundland – Joey Smallwood
- Premier of Nova Scotia – Henry Hicks (until November 20) then Robert Stanfield
- Premier of Ontario – Leslie Frost
- Premier of Prince Edward Island – Alex Matheson
- Premier of Quebec – Maurice Duplessis
- Premier of Saskatchewan – Tommy Douglas

=== Territorial governments ===
==== Commissioners ====
- Commissioner of Yukon – Frederick Howard Collins
- Commissioner of Northwest Territories – Robert Gordon Robertson

== Events ==
- February 10 – Wilbert Coffin is hanged
- May 1 – The Trades and Labour Congress of Canada merges with the Canadian Congress of Labour to form the Canadian Labour Congress.
- May 8 – The controversial bill to create the TransCanada pipeline is introduced in the House of Commons.
- May 15 – A CF-100 crashes into a Grey Nuns convent outside of Ottawa killing fifteen.
- June 20 – Saskatchewan election: Tommy Douglas's Co-operative Commonwealth Federation wins a fourth consecutive majority
- September 30 – Winnipeg connects to TransCanada Telephone System's microwave radio relay via MTS, bringing same day programming from CBC Television.
- November 1 – The second Springhill Mining Disaster occurs killing 39.
- November 4 – Lester B. Pearson proposes a successful resolution to the Suez Crisis, this will win him a Nobel Peace Prize.
- November 20 – Robert Stanfield becomes premier of Nova Scotia, replacing Henry Hicks
- December 9 – Trans-Canada Air Lines Flight 810 (9), a Canadair Northstar, crashes on Slesse Mountain near Chilliwack during heavy weather. The plane carried five members of the Saskatchewan Roughriders and Winnipeg Blue Bombers and fans on their way home from an all-star game in Vancouver. Bodies were not found until the following late summer due to severe terrain and high altitude and unknown location of the crash. This was one of the worst civilian air disasters in the world at the time.
- December 14 – John Diefenbaker is elected leader of the Progressive Conservative Party of Canada.
- René Lévesque begins hosting Point de Mire

== Sport ==
- March 15 - Whipper Billy Watson (William John Potts) becomes the first Canadian to hold the World Heavyweight Wrestling Championship by defeating Lou Thesz in Toronto
- April 10 - The Montreal Canadiens win their 8th Stanley Cup championship by defeating the Detroit Red Wings 4 games to 1. The deciding Game 5 was played at the Montreal Forum
- May 6 - The Ontario Hockey Association's Toronto Marlboros won their third (and second consecutive) Memorial Cup by defeating the Saskatchewan Junior Hockey League's Regina Pats 4 games to 0 (with 1 tie). All games at Maple Leaf Gardens in Toronto
- November 24 - The Edmonton Eskimos win their third (consecutive) Grey Cup by defeating the Montreal Alouettes by the score of 50 to 27 in the 44th Grey Cup played at Varsity Stadium in Toronto

== Arts and literature ==
=== New books ===
- Milton Acorn – In Love and Anger
- Pierre Berton – The Mysterious North
- Max Aitken – Men and Power
- Leonard Cohen – Let Us Compare Mythologies
- Harold Innis – Essays in Canadian Economic History
- Farley Mowat – Lost in the Barrens

=== Awards ===
- See 1956 Governor General's Awards for a complete list of winners and finalists for those awards.
- Stephen Leacock Award: Eric Nicol, Shall We Join The Ladies'

=== Music ===
- Walter Susskind replaces Sir Ernest MacMillan as the director of the Toronto Symphony Orchestra.
- Pianist Glenn Gould tours the Soviet Union

== Births ==
=== January to March ===
- January 6 – Peter Stoffer, politician
- January 7 – Mike Liut, ice hockey player and coach
- January 9 – Greg Dewar, politician
- January 27 – Kevyn Major Howard, actor and photographer (d. 2025)
- January 28 – David Faurschou, politician
- February 28 – Guy Maddin, screenwriter and film director
- February 29 – Steve Ashton, politician
- February 29 – Bob Speller, politician (d. 2021)

=== April to June ===
- April 4 – Evelyn Hart, ballet dancer
- April 6 - Normand Corbeil, composer (Double Jeopardy, Extreme Ops, The Statement, V) (d. 2013)
- April 10 – Thomas Graham, volleyball player
- May 7 – Jean Lapierre, television broadcaster, politician and Minister (d. 2016)
- May 9 – Wendy Crewson, actress
- May 15 – Ian Clyde, boxer
- May 19 – James Gosling, software developer, father of the Java programming language
- May 29 – Claude Drouin, politician
- June 10 – Hugh McMillan, musician
- June 11 – Simon Plouffe, mathematician and academic
- June 11 – Arthur Porter, physician and academic (d. 2015)
- June 15 – David Iftody, politician (d. 2001)
- June 15 – Dan Thompson, swimmer
- June 18 – Oliver Schroer, fiddler, composer and music producer (d. 2008)
- June 22 – Blake Debassige, artist

=== July to September ===
- July 8 – Terry Puhl, baseball player
- July 15 – Barry Melrose, ice hockey player, coach and commentator (d. 2026)
- July 17 – Bryan Trottier, ice hockey player
- July 20 - Jim Prentice, politician, Premier of Alberta 2014–2015 (d. 2016)
- August 5 - Jerry Ciccoritti, director
- August 7 – Paul Williams, long-distance runner
- August 12 – Bruce Greenwood, actor
- September 10 - Cordell Barker, animator

=== October to December ===
- October 5 – Brad Farrow, judoka
- October 7 – Brian Sutter, ice hockey player and coach
- October 17 – Sheela Basrur, medical doctor and Chief Medical Officer of Health in Ontario (d.2008)
- October 23 – Geoffrey Kelly, musician
- October 24 – Chris Clarke, boxer
- December 10 – Marie Bountrogianni, politician and Minister
- December 31 – Paul Zed, lawyer, professor and politician

== Deaths ==
=== January to June ===
- January 6 – Albert James Bradshaw, politician (b. 1882)
- January 12 – Sam Langford, boxer (b. 1886)
- February 14 – Aylesworth Perry, 6th Commissioner of the Royal Canadian Mounted Police (b. 1860)
- March 10 – Vere Ponsonby, 9th Earl of Bessborough, businessman, politician and Governor General of Canada (b. 1880)
- March 30 – Joseph W. Noseworthy, politician (b. 1888)
- March 30 – Thomas Dufferin Pattullo, politician and 22nd Premier of British Columbia (b. 1873)

=== July to December ===
- August 4 – Joseph Georges Bouchard, politician (b. 1888)
- September 11 – Billy Bishop, First World War flying ace (b. 1894)
- September 15 – Charles Dow Richards, judge, politician and 18th Premier of New Brunswick (b. 1879)
- September 18 – Adélard Godbout, politician and 15th Premier of Quebec (b. 1892)
- October 7 – Maud Allan, actor, dancer and choreographer (b. 1873)
- November 18 – Clarence Chant, astronomer and physicist (b. 1865)
- December 3 – Matthew Halton, radio and television journalist (b. 1904)
- December 7 – Huntley Gordon, actor (b. 1887)

== See also ==
- 1956 in Canadian television
- List of Canadian films
