= Crossword (disambiguation) =

A crossword is a word puzzle.

Crossword may also refer to:

== Arts and entertainment ==
- Crossword Puzzle, an album by The Partridge Family in 1973
- Crossword, an album by Helen Slater released in 2005
- Crossword Quiz, a Canadian game show which aired on CBC Television 1952–1953
- Crosswords DS, a 2008 video game by Nintendo
- Merv Griffin's Crosswords (commonly shortened to Crosswords), an American game show

== Other uses ==
- Crossword Bookstores, a chain of bookstores in India

== See also ==
- Crosswordese, a term for words found in crossword puzzles but seldom found in everyday conversation
