= 1958 in Canada =

- Decades: 1930s; 1940s; 1950s; 1960s; 1970s
- See also: History of Canada; Timeline of Canadian history; List of years in Canada

Events from the year 1958 in Canada.

== Incumbents ==
=== Crown ===
- Monarch – Elizabeth II

=== Federal government ===
- Governor General – Vincent Massey
- Prime Minister – John Diefenbaker
- Chief Justice – Patrick Kerwin (Ontario)
- Parliament – 23rd (until 1 February) then 24th (from 12 May)

=== Provincial governments ===
==== Lieutenant governors ====
- Lieutenant Governor of Alberta – John J. Bowlen
- Lieutenant Governor of British Columbia – Frank Mackenzie Ross
- Lieutenant Governor of Manitoba – John Stewart McDiarmid
- Lieutenant Governor of New Brunswick – David Laurence MacLaren (until June 5) then Joseph Leonard O'Brien
- Lieutenant Governor of Newfoundland – Campbell Leonard Macpherson
- Lieutenant Governor of Nova Scotia – Alistair Fraser (until January 15) then Edward Chester Plow
- Lieutenant Governor of Ontario – John Keiller MacKay
- Lieutenant Governor of Prince Edward Island – Thomas William Lemuel Prowse (until March 31) then Frederick Walter Hyndman
- Lieutenant Governor of Quebec – Gaspard Fauteux (until February 14) then Onésime Gagnon
- Lieutenant Governor of Saskatchewan – William John Patterson (until February 3) then Frank Lindsay Bastedo

==== Premiers ====
- Premier of Alberta – Ernest Manning
- Premier of British Columbia – W.A.C. Bennett
- Premier of Manitoba – Douglas Campbell (until June 30) then Dufferin Roblin
- Premier of New Brunswick – Hugh John Flemming
- Premier of Newfoundland – Joey Smallwood
- Premier of Nova Scotia – Robert Stanfield
- Premier of Ontario – Leslie Frost
- Premier of Prince Edward Island – Alex Matheson
- Premier of Quebec – Maurice Duplessis
- Premier of Saskatchewan – Tommy Douglas

=== Territorial governments ===
==== Commissioners ====
- Commissioner of Yukon – Frederick Howard Collins
- Commissioner of Northwest Territories – Robert Gordon Robertson

== Events ==
- January 16 – Louis St. Laurent is replaced by Lester B. Pearson as leader of the Liberal Party
- February 19–20 – Rt Hon Ellen Fairclough first woman to assume the duties of Prime Minister for two days during John Diefenbaker's absence from the country.
- March 25 – The Avro Arrow flies for the first time
- March 31 – John Diefenbaker leads the Progressive Conservative Party of Canada to a massive election victory.
- April 5 – The Seymour Narrows is made more easily passable after Ripple Rock was destroyed in one of the largest planned non-nuclear explosions
- May 12 – The North American Aerospace Defense Command (NORAD) agreement is signed between the United States and Canada.
- June 17 – The Second Narrows Bridge in Vancouver collapses killing 18.
- June 30 – Duff Roblin sworn in as premier of Manitoba
- July 1 – Canada-wide television broadcasting starts
- July 1 – The Lost Villages in Ontario are permanently flooded as part of the St. Lawrence Seaway construction project.
- October 22 – Canada appoints, Margaret Meagher, the country's first female ambassador, to Israel.
- October 23 – The third Springhill Mining Disaster occurs killing 74.

=== Full date unknown ===
- Ellen Fairclough becomes Canada's first federal female cabinet minister.
- Department of Physical Education started at the University of Saskatchewan

== Arts and literature ==
- July 16 – The Manitoba Theatre Centre opens.

=== New works ===
- John Kenneth Galbraith's The Affluent Society
- Farley Mowat's Coppermine Journey: An Account of a Great Adventure
- Antonine Maillet's first novel Pointe-aux-Coques

=== Awards ===
- See 1958 Governor General's Awards for a complete list of winners and finalists for those awards.
- Stephen Leacock Award: Eric Nicol, Girdle Me A Globe

=== Film ===
- Morley Callaghan's Now That April's Here is made into a feature film
- Allan Dwan directs his last film Enchanted Island

=== Music ===
- Paul Anka has four hit singles and becomes one of the most popular singers in the world.

== Sport ==
- January 17 - The Canadian Football League is established with 9 teams (Hamilton Tiger-Cats, Ottawa Rough Riders, Toronto Argonauts, Saskatchewan Roughriders, Winnipeg Blue Bombers, Edmonton Eskimos, Montreal Alouettes, Calgary Stampeders, and BC Lions)
- April 20 – Montreal Canadiens won their Tenth (and Third consecutive) Stanley Cup by defeating the Boston Bruins 4 games to 2.
- May 6 - Ottawa-Hull Canadiens won their Second (and only in Ottawa) Memorial Cup by defeating the Saskatchewan Junior Hockey League's Regina Pats 4 games to 2. The deciding Game 6 was played at Ottawa Auditorium
- November 29 – Winnipeg Blue Bombers won their Fourth Grey Cup by defeating the Hamilton Tiger-Cats 35–28 in the 46th Grey Cup played at Empire Stadium in Vancouver

== Births ==
=== January to June ===
- January 10 – Terrence Scammell, voice director and voice actor
- January 29 – Glen Cochrane, ice hockey player and scout
- February 15 – Peter Butler, long-distance runner
- February - Grant Bristow a CSIS asset with links to the Heritage Front white supremacist group
- February 23
  - Norm Spencer, actor (d. 2020)
  - Bob Stephen, Canadian football player (d. 2009)

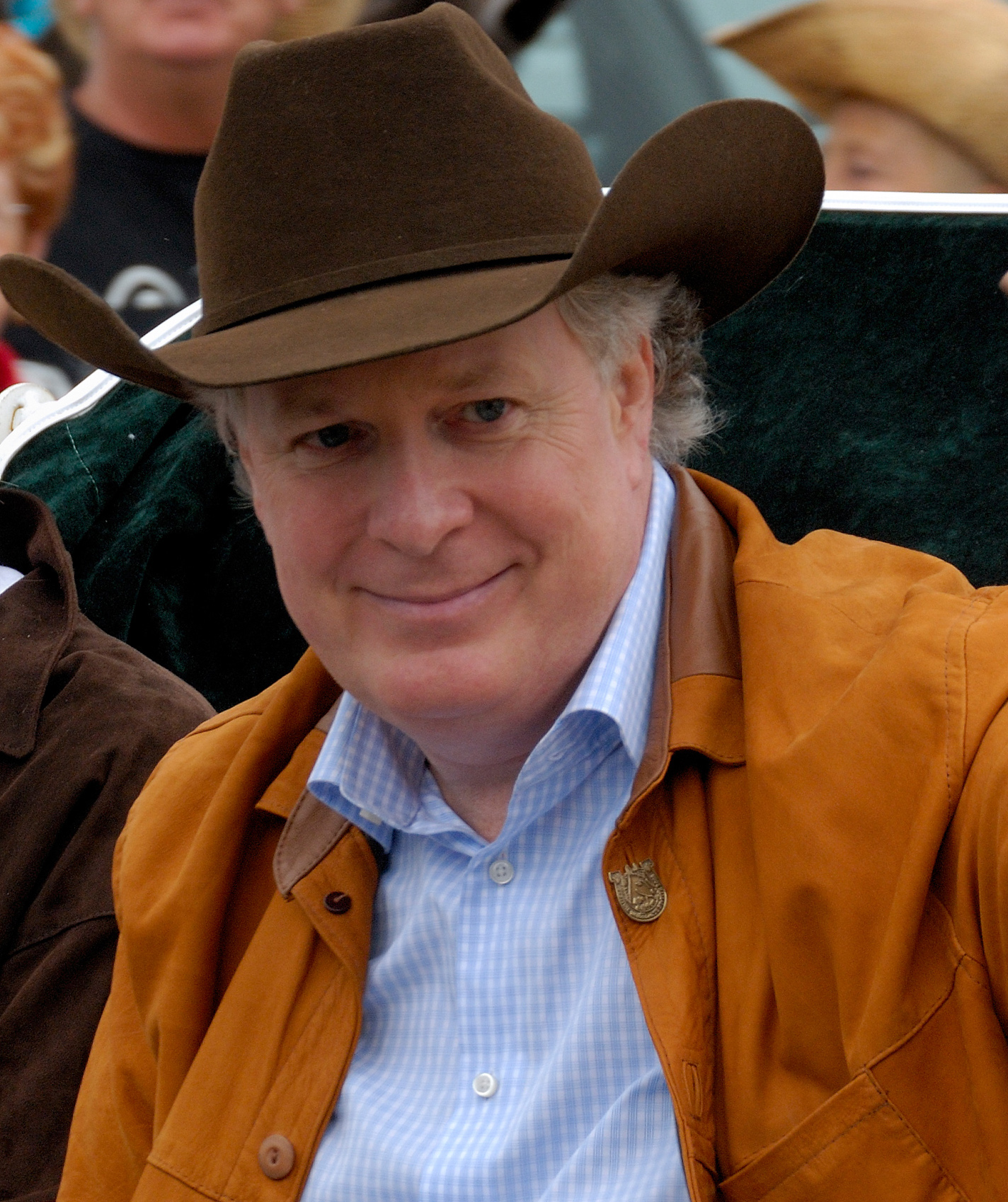
Jean Charest

- March 8 – Raymond Simard, politician
- March 30 – Maurice LaMarche, voice actor
- April 7 – Ted Nolan, ice hockey player and coach
- April 10 – Sophie Faucher, actress (d. 2026)
- April 15
  - Keith Acton, ice hockey player and coach
  - Anne Michaels, poet and novelist
- April 17 – Laslo Babits, javelin thrower
- May 10 – Gaétan Boucher, speed skater and double Olympic gold medallist
- May 13 – Claire Backhouse-Sharpe, badminton player
- May 18 – Bob Chaperon, snooker and billiards player
- June 24 – Jean Charest, lawyer and politician, 29th Premier of Quebec

=== July to September ===
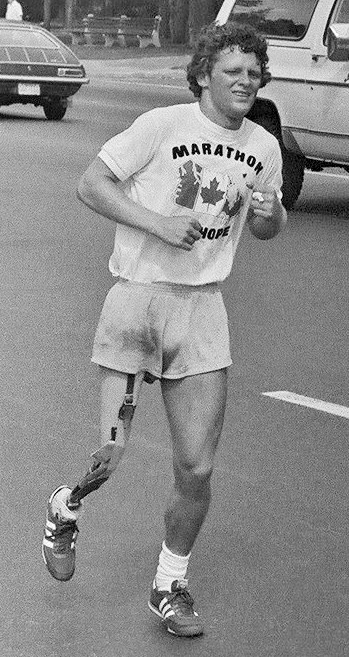
Terry Fox

- July 1 – Tom Magee, powerlifter and strongman competitor
- July 12 – Tonya Williams, actress
- July 28 – Terry Fox, humanitarian, athlete and cancer treatment activist (d. 1981)
- August 6 – Lorne Saxberg, television journalist and news anchor (d. 2006)
- August 15 – Craig MacTavish, ice hockey player and coach
- August 17 – Kirk Stevens, snooker player
- August 19 – Darryl Sutter, ice hockey player and coach
- August 22
  - Lyle Bauer, Canadian football player and executive (d. 2024)
  - Colm Feore, American-born stage, film and television actor
- August 29 – Linda Staudt, long-distance runner
- September 7 – Peter Mettler, filmmaker
- September 8 – Stevie Vallance, actress, voice actress, stage performer, singer, casting director and voice director
- September 11 – Jeffrey A. Hutchings, fisheries scientist (d. 2022)
- September 14 – Rob McCall, ice dancer (d. 1991)
- September 16
  - Diane Deans, politician (d. 2024)
  - Jennifer Tilly, actress and poker player
- September 17 – Monte Solberg, politician and businessman
- September 28 – Angella Taylor-Issajenko, sprinter

=== October to December ===
- October 8 – Neile Graham, poet and scholar
- November 3 – Kevin Sorenson, politician
- November 6 – Kevin Doherty, judoka
- November 19 – Joe Jordan, politician
- December 10 – David Paul Grove, actor and voice actor
- December 12 – Lucie Guay, canoe racer
- December 24 – Lyse Doucet, journalist and broadcaster
- December 25 – Alannah Myles, singer-songwriter

=== Full date unknown ===
- John Colapinto, journalist, author and novelist
- Gordon Stewart Anderson, writer (d. 1991)

== Deaths ==
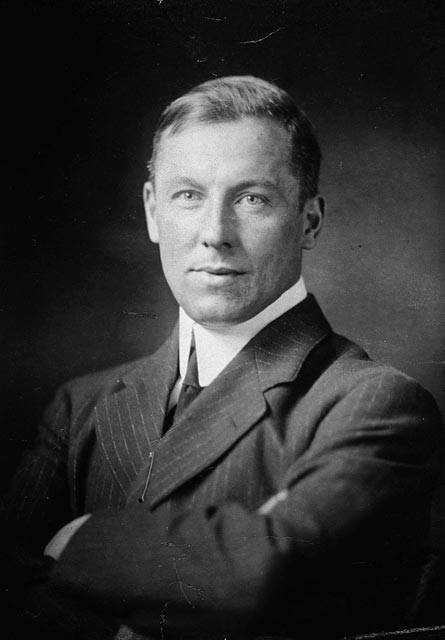
Robert W. Service, c.1905

=== January to June ===
- January 7 – Margaret Anglin, actress, director and producer (b. 1876)
- January 8 – John Duff, race car driver (b. 1895)
- January 16 – Charles Bélec, politician (b. 1872)
- April 1 – J. Arthur Ross, politician (b. 1893)
- May 12 – Lewis Stubbs, judge and politician (b. 1878)
- June 26 – George Orton, middle-distance runner and Olympic gold medallist, first Canadian to win an Olympic medal (b. 1873)

=== July to December ===
George Stewart Henry

- July 21 – Joseph Oscar Lefebre Boulanger, politician and lawyer (b. 1888)
- September 2 – George Stewart Henry, politician and 10th Premier of Ontario (b. 1871)
- September 11
  - Camillien Houde, politician and four-time mayor of Montreal (b. 1889)
  - Robert W. Service, poet and writer (b. 1874)
- October 2 – Charles Avery Dunning, politician, Minister and university chancellor (b. 1885)
- November 10 – Billy Boucher, ice hockey player (b. 1899)
- December 12 – Albert Walsh, Lieutenant Governor of Newfoundland (b. 1900)

== See also ==
- 1958 in Canadian television
- List of Canadian films
