= In the Present Tense =

- Genre: current affairs
- Directed by: Jan Cuchman
- Presented by: Paul Rush; Jennifer Davis
- Country of origin: Canada
- Original language: English
- No. of seasons: 1

Production
- Executive producer: Ralph Thomas
- Producers: Martyn Burke; Michael Callaghan
- Running time: 30 minutes

Original release
- Network: CBC Television
- Release: 13 January – 17 May 1974

In the Present Tense is a Canadian current affairs television program that aired on CBC Television in 1974.

== Premise ==
Each episode featured interviews and analysis on a particular topic such as America in the Middle East, an exploration of inflation, political rivalry in France and coal mining in the United Kingdom. Episodes were taped on the day of broadcast, and made significant use of videotaped material.

== Scheduling ==
This half-hour series was broadcast on alternate Sundays at 10:30 p.m. (Eastern) from 13 January to 17 May 1974. Ombudsman was broadcast in this time slot on other weeks.
