= Country Canada =

Country Canada may refer to:

- CBC News: Country Canada, a documentary TV series
- CBC Country Canada, the former name of the Canadian digital specialty channel Cottage Life
