= Jeanne Auclair =

Canadian artist (1924–2026)

Jeanne Courtemanche Auclair
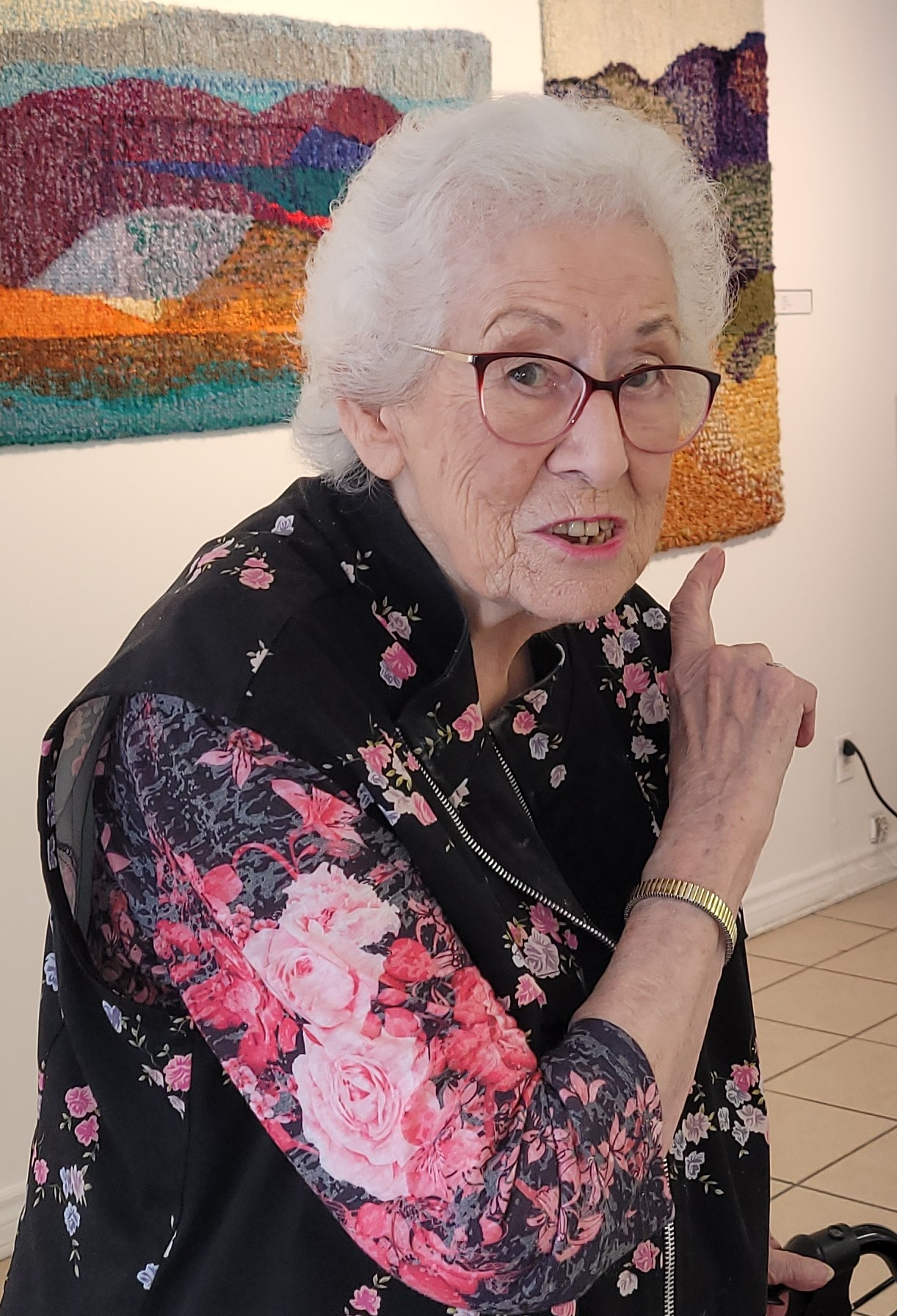
- Pictured in 2022
- Born: Jeanne Courtemanche; November 13, 1924; Montreal, Quebec, Canada
- Died: January 10, 2026 (aged 101)
- Occupation: Artist
- Known for: painter, fabric artist, mosaicist, maker of marionettes
- Spouse: Louis Auclair
- Website: jeanneauclair.com

Jeanne Courtemanche Auclair (November 13, 1924 – January 10, 2026) was a Canadian multidisciplinary artist from Montreal, Quebec. She is known for her paintings, tapestries, marionettes and mosaics.

== Life and career ==
Jeanne Courtemanche was born in Montreal, Quebec on November 13, 1924. She studied at the École Supérieure Ste-Croix (1939-1942), and then at the École des beaux-arts de Montréal (1942-1947). Her teachers were Stanley Cosgrove and Alfred Pellan among others.

From 1953 to 1955, Auclair began working on the second season of Pepinot and Capucine, the first television program broadcast by Radio Canada. Her job was to make and repair the marionette puppets seen on the show.

Towards the end of the 1950s she developed an interest in mosaics which she studied in Mexico in 1956. On her return to Quebec, she was an apprentice of André Vau (Montréal). Along with her then partner Louis Auclair, Auclair also created mosaic walls for the main entrance of a Quebec City seminary in 1959. One 1963 commission involved covering an entry hall with mosaics at the Centre Professionnel de Montréal.

One of Auclair's paintings graces the cover of the book Pour l'avenir du monde (2007) by André Myre.

In 1961 she received the first prize given by the Association professionnelle des artisans du Québec (APAQ).

In 2022, at age 99, Courtemanche Auclair was honored with a retrospective exhibition of her works by the Artistes en arts visuels du nord de Montréal.

Auclair died on January 10, 2026, at the age of 101.
