= Gwen Grant =

English writer

- Born: Gwendoline Ellen Rewston; 5 May 1940 (age 86) Worksop, Nottinghamshire England
- Occupation: Writer
- Spouse: Ian Grant

Gwen Grant is an English writer primarily known for her works for children and young adults and is the author of seventeen published novels and picture books. Many of her short stories and poems have been anthologised in collections by leading publishers, including Oxford University Press and Macmillan. Her initial novel, Private – Keep Out, was shortlisted for both the Carnegie Medal and The Other Award, and she has since been the recipient of a number of additional awards and shortlisted for others. She was also the subject of a documentary by Thames TV and her works have been featured on BBC and ITV segments.

In addition to her contributions as a writer, Gwen Grant has also done important outreach work in schools, stimulating interest in reading and creative writing in children by leading individually crafted classes and seminars. She also coaches aspiring new writers, serving as a respected guide and editor of their beginning efforts.

== Biography ==
Gwendoline Ellen Rewston was born in Worksop, Nottinghamshire in 1940, in the early days of World War II. At the time, the town's economy was based almost entirely on the fortunes and misfortunes of the coal mining industry. Gwen, the fourth of six children, was the daughter of George Rewston, a general labourer and miner, and his wife, Alice (née Hall), a homemaker. Her early life and experiences were strongly impacted by the poverty of a miner's family and what she heard and observed of the dangerous working conditions of the "pit", as the mines were commonly known, and by the deprivations and strains of the war. Despite that, her parents taught her that there was opportunity for everyone. For an anthology of women's writing published in the United States, she wrote,

Although I am English, having been born and raised in Worksop, a small town in Nottinghamshire, the words that have always meant a lot to me come from the American Declaration of Independence of 1776: 'We hold these truths to be self-evident; that all men are created equal.'

When I was growing up, my family struggled to make ends meet but poor as we were, I was always encouraged to believe that if the commitment was there, I could do anything I set my mind to. I wanted to be a writer and because my parents believed that all men are created equal and taught that to their children, I set out full of hope and confidence until I made my dream a reality.

I've read other words since then that could equally well have been part of my family's belief system also: 'We hold these truths to be self-evident; that all men and women are created equal.' (Elizabeth Cady Stanton – first women's rights convention, New York, 1848.)

Gwendoline Rewston married Ian Grant and is known personally and professionally as Gwen Grant. She became the mother of twin sons, and is now a grandmother and great-grandmother.

In 1975, she earned a Bachelor of Arts in Humanities from The Open University and in the same year, began her writing career. Her first picture book, Matthew and His Magic Kite, was published in 1977. In 1978, she published Private – Keep Out and followed up with Knock and Wait. Her output since has been prodigious and she continues her work today. In 2010, she contributed a story to Stories for Haiti, an anthology published as a charitable project to help bring relief to the victims of the destructive earthquake there.

== Publications ==
=== Novels ===
- Private – Keep Out ("The funniest children's book ever written" Lucy Mangan, The Guardian. Shortlisted: Carnegie Medal and The Other Award)
- Knock And Wait
- One Way Only
- Enemies Are Dangerous
- Lily Pickle Band Book (Translated. Shortlisted: Guardian Children's Fiction Award)
- Lily Pickle Eleven
- Bonny Starr and the Riddles of Time
- Walloping Stick War (short novel)
- Crash (short novel)
- The Revolutionary's Daughter (Nominated: Carnegie Medal, Shortlisted: Lancs Children's Book Award)
- Gypsy Racer
- Fox Fire (short novel)
- The Last Chance (Shortlisted: Lancs Children's Book Award)

=== Television and Radio ===
- Thames TV Documentary
- East Midlands Arts Writers Video Series
- Private – Keep Out featured on Black and White and Read All Over (BBC)
- Private – Keep Out featured on Woman's Hour – (BBC)
- Knock and Wait featured on ITV's Book Tower

=== Picture books ===
- Matthew and His Magic Kite (Translated.)
- Little Blue Car (Translated. Included Best British Books 1992; Also animated cartoon – BBC CBeebies)
- Jonpanda (Won: Notts Libraries Acorn Award 1993)
- Race Day (Translated)

=== Anthologies – Stories and Poems ===
- Mothers and Daughters (Mammoth)
- Mixed Feelings
- Sinister Stories (Methuen. Translated.)
- Our Book of Christmas Stories (Oxford University Press)
- Orchard Children's Treasury (Orchard Books)
- All Year Round (Evans)
- Scholastic Assemblies (Scholastic Books)
- Woman's Realm (Translated.)
- Poem in "Woman and Home"
- Short stories on BBC Radio
- Mother Daughter Bonds (Poetry Now)
- Lines in the Sand (Frances Lincoln; in aid of UNICEF)
- In the Frame (Five Leaves Press)
- WOW! (Scholastic Children's Books; in aid of NSPCC Childline)
- 100 Stories for Haiti (Bridge House Press; in aid of Haiti earthquake refugees)
- Monster Poems (MacmIllan)
- Folio (Literary magazine)
- Leaves (Southwell Minster magazine)
- Poems in many poetry magazines.
