= Tom Graham (volleyball) =

Canadian volleyball player (born 1956)

Thomas Graham
Personal information
- Born: April 10, 1956 (age 70) Comox, British Columbia, Canada

Volleyball information

National team
- Years: Team
- 1975–1979: Canada

Thomas Graham (born April 10, 1956) is a retired canadian volleyball player, who represented his native country at the 1976 Summer Olympics in Montreal, Quebec, Canada. There the resident of Saskatoon, Saskatchewan finished in ninth and last place with the men's national volleyball team, after four defeats in the preliminary round. He was born in Comox, British Columbia.

== Achievements ==
Tom is an expert in goal-setting. In his highschool years, he failed his first attempts at volleyball. Determined to make the local team, he found things he could work on and have mastered for the next try. Tom later became part of the Canadian Olympic volleyball team from 1975–1979 and gained a PhD through Kinesiology. He then started coaching the University of Victoria's women's team, then helped Saskatchewan provincial teams and the U of S volleyball team attend four national championships. Tom coached the Saskatchewan Men's Volleyball Team which captured gold at the 1987 Canada Winter Games, and the 1987-88 U of S Huskies CIAU Men's Volleyball National Champions. He also received the National Coach of the Year award for CIAU Men's Volleyball for the 1986–87 season.

Graham has also done research on teenage athletes and more effective ways to coach them. Graham also coaches an 18 and under volleyball team (the pups) based in Saskatoon, Saskatchewan.
