= Converging Lines =

1977 Canadian television documentary

- Genre: Documentary
- Country of origin: Canada
- Original language: English
- No. of seasons: 1
- No. of episodes: 2

Production
- Producers: Louise Lore; Herb Krosney
- Running time: 60 minutes

Original release
- Network: CBC Television
- Release: 20 March – 21 March 1977

Converging Lines is a Canadian two-part television documentary that aired on CBC Television in 1977.

== Premise ==
These programmes profiled the Jewish and Islamic faiths, featuring interviews with their respective adherents and providing historical background over two episodes:

1. "A People, A Place, A Book" (Louise Lore, producer) – Judaism
2. "The Surrender" (Herb Krosney, producer) – Islam

== Scheduling ==
The two-hour-long episodes were broadcast on 20 and 21 March 1977, at 10:00 p.m. (Eastern).
