= Carica-Tours =

Canadian television series

- Genre: Children's television
- Presented by: Jack Der
- Country of origin: Canada
- Original language: English

Production
- Running time: 30 minutes

Original release
- Network: CBC Television
- Release: September 12 – November 28, 1952

Carica-Tours was a weekly half-hour Canadian television series hosted by artist Jack Der who illustrated story tours of different countries. The show was broadcast from Montreal.
