= Detective Quiz =

Canadian television series

Detective Quiz is a Canadian half-hour television series that debuted September 10, 1952 on CBC Television. The show was hosted by Morley Callaghan, who presented clues to help viewers guess the criminal. The show was cancelled after three weeks.
