= Ferg Hawke =

Fergus (‘Ferg’) Hawke (born November 16, 1957, in New Westminster, British Columbia, Canada) is an international ultra-distance runner, residing in South Surrey, British Columbia, Canada.

== Badwater Ultramarathon ==
He has placed second in the Badwater Ultramarathon twice (2004, 2005), to Dean Karnazes (2004: 27:30:20; finished second by 8 minutes) and Scott Jurek (2005: 26:33:00; finished second by 1:57). His 2005 time is the ninth best time ever in the history of the race. The Badwater Ultramarathon is a 135-mile (217 km) ultramarathon through Death Valley in mid-July, starting at Badwater Basin, the second-lowest point in the Western Hemisphere, 282 feet below sea level, and finishing 8300 feet up Mount Whitney. With a cumulative vertical ascent of 13,000 ft (4000 m) and a cumulative descent of 4,700 ft (1400 m), and temperatures reaching 130 degrees Fahrenheit (54 degrees Celsius), it is considered by some people to be the most difficult footrace in the world.

== Other ultramarathons ==
He holds the second-best time by a North American in the Marathon des Sables, a staged 150-mile ultramarathon race through the Sahara Desert, in Morocco: 2002, with a time of 22:51:03 (the record is held by Eric Deshaies of Ottawa, Canada: 2007).

Other notable race results include:

- Chuckanut Mountain 50 km, Bellingham, Washington, USA: first-place finisher overall (1995), second (1998), third (1996 and 1999).
- Elk Beaver 50 mile Canadian Championships, Vancouver Island, B.C.: first-place finisher overall (1996).
- Rose City 50 mile Ultramarathon, Portland, Oregon, USA: first-place finisher overall (1995).
- Eagle Run 100 mile, Apex Mountain, British Columbia: first-place finisher overall (1995). This race was the first official 100 mile distance ultramarathon ever held in Canada.

== Triathlons and ultramans ==
His introduction to endurance events came with triathlons. He served on the Canadian National Triathlon team in 1991, representing Canada at the World Triathlon Championships in Surfers Paradise, Australia that same year.

He has competed in several ultra-triathlons, including the Ultraman World Championships in Hawaii. The Ultraman is a three-day endurance triathlon consisting of a 6.2 mile swim and a 90-mile cycle on day 1, a 171.4 mile cycle on day 2, and a 52.4 mile double marathon on the final day. The course circumnavigates the Big Island of Hawaii and is considered to be one of the most challenging triathlons in the world. At the 1999 Ultraman World Championships he finished third overall, with a combined time of 23:41:16.

== The Distance of Truth ==
He is the subject of a documentary film, The Distance of Truth (directed by Robert Letson under the name of 'Meno'), and has been featured in numerous television, radio, and print articles.
