= CBC Concert =

1952 Canadian television series

- Genre: Music
- Country of origin: Canada
- Original language: English
- No. of seasons: 1

Production
- Producer: Franz Kraemer
- Running time: 30 minutes

Original release
- Release: October 31 – December 19, 1952

CBC Concert is a Canadian television series that aired on CBC Television from October 31 to December 19, 1952, on Fridays at 9–9:30 p.m. Produced by Franz Kraemer, musical performances were broadcast from Toronto. The first episode featured folk blues singer Josh White.
