= Ombudsman (TV program) =

Canadian television program

- Genre: Investigative journalism
- Presented by: Robert M. Cooper; Kathleen Ruff
- Country of origin: Canada
- Original language: English
- No. of seasons: 7

Production
- Running time: 30 minutes

Original release
- Network: CBC Television
- Release: 6 January 1974 – 20 April 1980

Ombudsman is a Canadian television program that sought to investigate and resolve disputes between people and government or business systems. When the series began, government ombudsman offices were only available in a few Canadian provinces. The initial Ombudsman episodes began mid-season in January 1974 and were broadcast fortnightly, sharing its Sunday night time slot with In the Present Tense. Beginning with the fall 1974 season, CBC aired the series most weeks.

Lawyer Robert M. Cooper was the program's host until 1979, when he shifted his attention to film production. Kathleen Ruff replaced him in the final season. By the time CBC cancelled the series, nearly all Canadian provincial governments had opened ombudsman offices.
