= Howie Meeker's Hockey School =

Canadian television series

Howie Meeker's Hockey School is a Canadian television series that was broadcast for 107 fifteen-minute episodes from 1973 to 1977 on CBC Television. Host Howie Meeker's experience as an ice hockey player and coach with the Toronto Maple Leafs was featured in this instructional series on the sport. Produced in St. John's, Newfoundland and directed by Ron Harrison and/or John Spaulding, the series aired weekly during the hockey season.

The series features boys learning the basic skills about the game: skating, puck control and passing.

The television series was based on summer hockey camps held in various locations in Canada and the United States. Children were enrolled for two-week sessions, lived in campus housing and participated in skate time as well as many other physical and classroom activities. The camps and the series was based on Meeker's premise that the game was suffering from poor instruction and poor quality equipment at the junior levels.
