= Sunshine Sketches (TV series) =

- Also known as: Addison Spotlight Theatre
- Genre: drama/humour
- Written by: Stephen Leacock (original material); Don Harron (adaptation); Henry Kaplan (adaptation)
- Starring: Timothy Findley; Peggi Loder; Peg Dixon; Frank Perry
- Narrated by: John Drainie
- Country of origin: Canada
- Original language: English
- No. of seasons: 1

Production
- Producer: Robert Allen
- Running time: 30 minutes

Original release
- Network: CBC Television
- Release: 9 September 1952 – 31 March 1953

Sunshine Sketches, also known as Addison Spotlight Theatre, is a Canadian dramatic television series which aired on CBC Television from 1952 to 1953. It was the first English-language drama to be broadcast on Canadian television.

== Premise ==
The series was an adaptation of Sunshine Sketches of a Little Town by Stephen Leacock. Don Harron and Henry Kaplan wrote the episodes from this material. It was later titled Addison Spotlight Theatre for its sponsor, an automobile dealer.

The series was filmed in Beaverton, Ontario.

== Cast ==
- Timothy Findley as Peter Pupkin
- Peggi Loder as Zena Pepperleigh
- Eric House as Dean Drone
- Peg Dixon as Lillian Drone
- Frank Perry as Mallory Tompkins
- Paul Kligman as Josh Smith
- Gerry Sarracini as the poet
- Barbara Hamilton as the poet's wife
- Gerry Campbell as the drugstore clerk
- John Drainie as narrator
- Robert Christie as Golgotha Gingham
- Hugh Webster as Shorty

== Scheduling ==
This half-hour series was broadcast on Tuesdays at 7:30 p.m. from 9 September 1952 to 31 March 1953. Its debut marked the first Canadian broadcast of an English-language dramatic series.
