= Grand Old Country =

- Presented by: Ronnie Prophet
- Country of origin: Canada
- No. of seasons: 6

Production
- Running time: 60 minutes

Original release
- Network: CTV
- Release: 1975 – 1981

Grand Old Country is a Canadian television variety series airing on CTV from 1975 to 1981. The show was hosted by country music singer Ronnie Prophet.

The show featured a variety of Canadian country music performers with a mix of others.

The show aired for five seasons before it was retitled The Ronnie Prophet Show. It aired for one more season under that name.
