= The Watson Report =

- Starring: Patrick Watson
- Country of origin: Canada
- Original language: English

Production
- Running time: 30 min (time slot)

Original release
- Network: CBC
- Release: 9 October 1975 – 25 May 1981

The Watson Report is a Canadian current affairs television program, seen nationally on CBC from 1975 to 1981. The titular host was Patrick Watson, previously of This Hour Has Seven Days whose interviews for the show included national political leaders. More elaborate filmed features appeared in The Watson Report during its later years.
