= Let's See =

Canadian television series

Let's See is a Canadian television series broadcast on CBC Television between September 6, 1952 to July 4, 1953. The segment, which has a running time of 15 minutes, is a puppet show with a character named Uncle Chichimus (voice of John Conway), who presented each evening's schedule as well as the weather forecast. Percy Saltzman was host and Larry D. Mann was a regular.

The show was produced by Norman Campbell, Franz Kraemer, Norman Jewison, and Don Brown. Joan Hughes was the script assistant.
