= Burns Chuckwagon from the Stampede Corral =

Canadian variety television series

- Genre: Western variety
- Country of origin: Canada
- Original language: English
- No. of seasons: 1

Production
- Producer: Mario Prizek
- Production location: Vancouver
- Running time: 30 minutes

Original release
- Network: CBC Television
- Release: 3 November 1954 – 29 June 1955

Burns Chuckwagon From the Stampede Corral is a Canadian variety television program. It aired on CBC Television from 1954 to 1955.

== Premise ==
Produced in Vancouver, Burns Chuckwagon was a western-themed variety series. Musical guest included Lorraine McAllister, Don Francks, Pat Kirkpatrick, Arnie Nelson and The Rhythm Pals. Comedian Barney Potts also made regular appearances. Mandolin player George Colangis and banjo player Wallie Peters were also guests.

== Scheduling ==
This half-hour series was broadcast Wednesdays at 10:30 p.m. (Eastern) from 3 November 1954 to 29 June 1955.
