= Clarence Wallace =

Lieutenant Governor of British Columbia (1893–1982)

The Honourable Clarence Wallace CBE
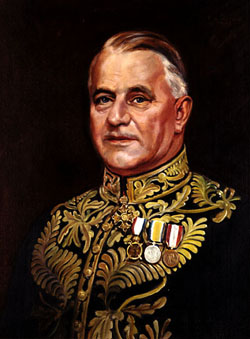
- 1955 portrait

18th Lieutenant Governor of British Columbia
- In office October 1, 1950 – October 3, 1955
- Monarchs: George VI; Elizabeth II
- Governors General: The Viscount Alexander of Tunis; Vincent Massey
- Premier: Boss Johnson; W. A. C. Bennett
- Preceded by: Charles Arthur Banks
- Succeeded by: Frank Mackenzie Ross

Personal details
- Born: June 22, 1893 Vancouver, British Columbia, Canada
- Died: November 12, 1982 (aged 89) Palm Desert, California, United States
- Profession: Shipbuilder

Clarence Wallace CBE (June 22, 1893 – November 12, 1982) was a Canadian shipbuilder and the 18th Lieutenant Governor of British Columbia.

Born in Vancouver, British Columbia, he fought in World War I and was wounded at Ypres. After the war, he became the president of his father's business, Burrard Dry Dock. During World War II, he built ships for the war and was appointed a Commander of the Order of the British Empire in 1946. From 1950 to 1955, he was the Lieutenant-Governor of British Columbia. He was appointed a Knight of Grace of the Order of St. John of Jerusalem.

He died at his winter residence in Palm Desert, California in 1982.
