= Pepinot and Capucine =

Canadian children's television series

- Also known as: Pépinot et Capucine
- Genre: Children's puppetry
- Written by: Reginald Boisvert
- Composer: Neil Chotem
- Country of origin: Canada
- Original languages: French; English
- No. of seasons: 1

Production
- Producer: Jean-Paul Ladouceur
- Production location: Montreal
- Running time: 30 minutes

Original release
- Network: Radio-Canada; CBC Television
- Release: 7 September 1952 – 19 June 1955

Pepinot and Capucine (French title, Pépinot et Capucine) is a Canadian children's television series that aired on Radio-Canada from 1952 to 1954, and on the English-language CBC Television from 1954 to 1955.

== Premise ==
This series was produced at Radio-Canada's Montreal studios. The title characters were the puppets Pepinot and his sister Capucine. Other regular characters included Mr. Black, a pet bear, known as l'Ours in French. Mr. White, an inventor, was known on the French series as Monsieur Blanc.

== Scheduling ==
The series was broadcast on Radio-Canada since 7 September 1952 until 1954. After this, the series was simply titled Pépinot which was produced in several runs until 1972. Episodes continued to be rebroadcast through mid-1973.

The half-hour English version appeared on CBC Television on Sundays at 5:30 p.m. in two seasons, first from 3 January to 27 June 1954 and secondly from 19 September 1954 to 19 June 1955.

== See also ==
- Jeanne Auclair, artist who created puppets used on the show
