= Crossword Quiz =

- Genre: Game show
- Presented by: Kim McIlroy (1952–1953); Morley Callaghan (1953)
- Starring: James Bannerman, Ralph Allen
- Country of origin: Canada
- Original language: English
- No. of seasons: 1

Production
- Running time: 30 minutes

Original release
- Network: CBC Television
- Release: December 26, 1952 – June 30, 1953

Crossword Quiz is a Canadian game show which aired on CBC Television December 26, 1952 to June 30, 1953. Gameshow moderator Kim McIlroy provided crossword puzzle-style clues to James Bannerman, Ralph Allen, editor of Maclean's magazine, and two guest panelists. Morley Callaghan replaced McIlroy as moderator on March 20, 1953.
