= This Land (TV series) =

Canadian documentary television series

- Presented by: Jon Hopkins; John Foster; Don Francks; Phyllis Gorman; Laurie Jennings; Mary Chapman; Mike Halleran
- Country of origin: Canada
- No. of seasons: 12

Production
- Running time: 30/60 minutes

Original release
- Network: CBC Television
- Release: September 23, 1970 – August 31, 1982

This Land is a Canadian television series that aired from 1970 to 1982 on CBC Television. Evolving from the earlier series This Land of Ours, a documentary series about Canada’s nature and resources, This Land expanded its focus to include environmental and conservation issues.

Hosts of the show included John Hopkins, Phyllis Gorman, Laurie Jennings, Mary Chapman, John Foster, Mike Halleran and Don Francks.
