= Open House (Canadian talk show) =

- Genre: Talk show
- Presented by: Corinne Conley; Anna Cameron and Fred Davis; Gwen Grant and Max Ferguson; Paul Fox; Elizabeth Cleaton; Lorraine Thomson (1960-62); Jehane Benoit; Mary Humphries; Kildare Dobbs

Production
- Producers: Ted Pope; Peggy Nairn Liptrott (1959-1962)
- Running time: 30 minutes

Original release
- Release: 1952 – 1962

Open House is a 1952 Canadian talk show that presented segments of interest to women, including cooking, fabrics, interior design, exercise, fashion, books and current events. The show was originally hosted by Corinne Conley. Later, the show was co-hosted by a male/female couple including Anna Cameron and Fred Davis were the television couple, and their place was taken, starting in 1960, by Gwen Grant and Max Ferguson.
