= The C.G.E. Show =

Canadian television series

- Also known as: The Leslie Bell Singers; C.G.E. Showtime; Showtime
- Genre: Music
- Written by: Dorothy Robb
- Directed by: Bruce Macpherson; Norman Jewison

Production
- Producers: Drew Crossnan; Harvey Hart (1954-55); Don Hudson (1955-56); Len Casey (1957-59)

Original release
- Release: September 8, 1952 – June 14, 1959

The C.G.E. Show is a Canadian television series that aired on CBC Television on September 8, 1952 to June 14, 1959. The C.G.E. Show (sponsored by Canadian General Electric) featured the Leslie Bell Singers, a choir of twenty-one young women, and the Howard Cable Orchestra.
