= Circle 8 Ranch =

From 1955 until 1978, Circle 8 Ranch was a weekly country and western television program broadcast each Tuesday night on Wingham, Ontario's CKNX, Channel 8. It began as a radio program called the CKNX Barn Dance on CKNX's AM sister station.

The half-hour variety show was first hosted by broadcaster Johnny Brent, then later by musician Ernie King. The program featured popular country acts of the local, provincial and national stage. Each program ended with the words "Let's say goodbye like we said hello, in a friendly kind of way..."

Don Robertson's Ranch Boys hosted many CKNX Barn Dances in the south-central and southwestern Ontario areas. The travelling show was an offshoot of the program.

Regular cast members who developed into regional celebrities were Ernie King, Hugh Elder, Ross Mann, Don Robertson, Cora Robertson, Wayne Riehl and Ron Coulthard. Over the years, the program helped launch the careers of such Canadian musicians as Tommy Hunter, Al Cherney, Gordie Tapp, The Good Brothers, Gordon Lightfoot and The Mercey Brothers.
