= CBC News Magazine =

1952–1981 Canadian TV series

- Also known as: Newsmagazine
- Genre: News
- Presented by: Gordon Burwash (Toronto); Norman DePoe; Ken Mason; Michael Maclear; Stanley Burke (London); Tom Gould (Far East); David Levy (Moscow); Peter Reilly (United Nations); Phil Calder (Bonn); James Minifie and Knowlton Nash (Washington, D.C.) Peter Kent
- Narrated by: Lorne Greene (early years)
- Country of origin: Canada
- Original language: English

Production
- Executive producers: Don Cameron (1960–66); Tim Kotcheff (1976–77); George James (1977–79); Trina McQueen (1979–80); Ann Medina (1980–81)
- Producers: John Lant; Harry Rasky; David Marcus Roland (1961–64); Murray Hunter (1964–66); William Harcourt (1966–73); Ted Kotcheff (1973–76); George James (1976–78); Tom Leach (1978–81); Tony Hillman (1978–81); Jim Bittermann; Peter Rehak (1978–80); Peter Kent (1975–78)
- Editors: Gunnar Rugheimer; Stanley Clinton; Harry Rasky; Arla Saare; Joan Barstead; Michael Maclear
- Running time: 30 minutes

Original release
- Network: CBC Television
- Release: September 8, 1952 – 1981

CBC News Magazine (later known as Newsmagazine) is a Canadian news television series which was broadcast weekly and debuted on CBC Television on September 8, 1952. The series presented the week's international news highlights and documentaries from CBC correspondents around the world. It ran until 1981 when it was cancelled in order to make way for The Journal.

Lorne Greene, then an announcer and newsreader for the CBC, was narrator for the series in its early years. It was hosted by the anchor of The National from the 1970s until its demise.
