= 1971 in Canada =

- Decades: 1950s; 1960s; 1970s; 1980s; 1990s
- See also: History of Canada; Timeline of Canadian history; List of years in Canada

Events from the year 1971 in Canada.

== Incumbents ==
=== Crown ===
- Monarch – Queen Elizabeth II

=== Federal government ===
- Governor General – Roland Michener
- Prime Minister – Pierre Trudeau
- Chief Justice – Gérald Fauteux (Quebec)
- Parliament – 28th

=== Provincial governments ===
==== Lieutenant governors ====
- Lieutenant Governor of Alberta – Grant MacEwan
- Lieutenant Governor of British Columbia – John Robert Nicholson
- Lieutenant Governor of Manitoba – William John McKeag
- Lieutenant Governor of New Brunswick – Wallace Samuel Bird (until October 2) then Hédard Robichaud (from October 8)
- Lieutenant Governor of Newfoundland – Ewart John Arlington Harnum
- Lieutenant Governor of Nova Scotia – Victor de Bedia Oland
- Lieutenant Governor of Ontario – William Ross Macdonald
- Lieutenant Governor of Prince Edward Island – John George MacKay
- Lieutenant Governor of Quebec – Hugues Lapointe
- Lieutenant Governor of Saskatchewan – Stephen Worobetz

==== Premiers ====
- Premier of Alberta – Harry Strom (until September 10) then Peter Lougheed
- Premier of British Columbia – W.A.C. Bennett
- Premier of Manitoba – Edward Schreyer
- Premier of New Brunswick – Richard Hatfield
- Premier of Newfoundland – Joey Smallwood
- Premier of Nova Scotia – Gerald Regan
- Premier of Ontario – John Robarts (until March 1) then Bill Davis
- Premier of Prince Edward Island – Alexander B. Campbell
- Premier of Quebec – Robert Bourassa
- Premier of Saskatchewan – Ross Thatcher (until June 30) then Allan Blakeney

=== Territorial governments ===
==== Commissioners ====
- Commissioner of Yukon – James Smith
- Commissioner of Northwest Territories – Stuart Milton Hodgson

== Events ==
=== January to June ===
- February 16 – The Fuddle Duddle incident.
- March 1 – Bill Davis becomes premier of Ontario, replacing John Robarts
- March 4 – Prime Minister Trudeau weds Margaret Sinclair
- March 31 – FLQ terrorist Paul Rose is sentenced to life in prison
- April 5 – The first CANDU reactor begins operation at Gentilly, Quebec
- April 14 – The Kingston Penitentiary riot begins. Prisoners seize control and a four-day siege ensues.
- May 4 – A sinkhole destroys much of Saint-Jean-Vianney, Quebec, and kills 31
- May 22 – Ontario Place opens in Toronto
- June 1 – Census Day for the 1971 Census of Canada, which finds Canada's total population to be 21,568,311.
- June 3 – The controversial Spadina Expressway project is cancelled
- June 11 – Jack Davis becomes Canada's first Minister of the Environment, heading the new department of Environment Canada
- June 14 – The Victoria Charter proposing constitutional reforms is written by the first ministers. It was later rejected by Robert Bourassa.
- June 23 – Saskatchewan election: Allan Blakeney's NDP wins a majority, defeating Ross Thatcher's Liberals

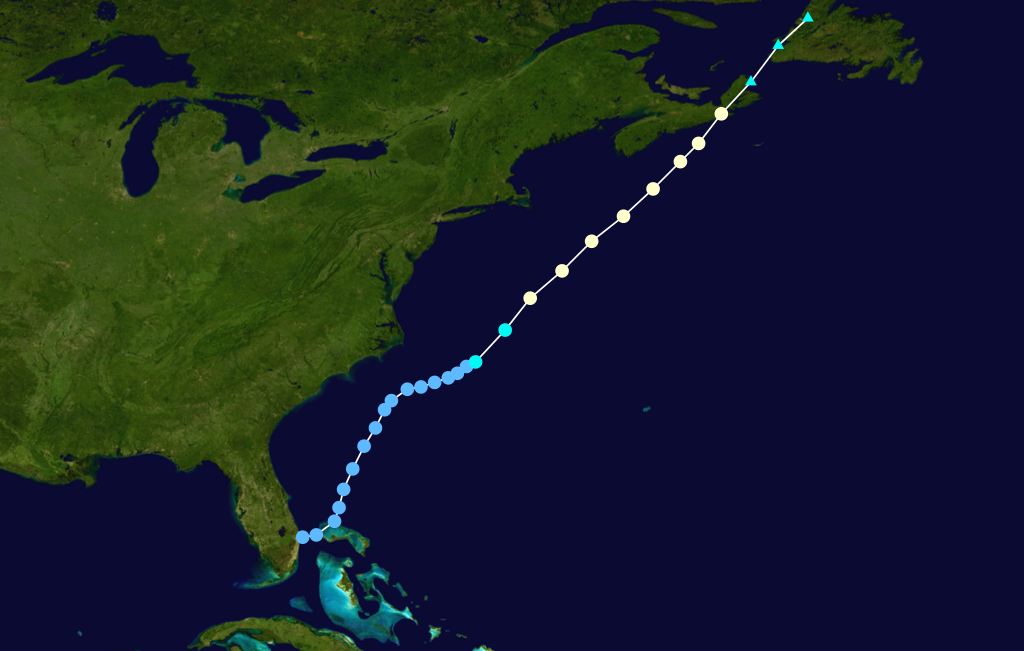
Hurricane Beth hit Nova Scotia in August

- June 30 – Allan Blakeney becomes premier of Saskatchewan, replacing Ross Thatcher

=== July to December ===
- July 22 – Ross Thatcher, leader of the Saskatchewan Liberal Party dies in office
- July 29 – The Bluenose II is donated to the province of Nova Scotia
- July 30 – The Canada-based animation studio Nelvana is established by Michael Hirsh, Patrick Loubert and Clive A. Smith in Toronto
- August 16 – Hurricane Beth hits Nova Scotia
- August 28 – Canada's first gay rights demonstration, organized by George Hislop, takes place on Parliament Hill
- August 30 – Alberta election: Peter Lougheed's PCs win a majority, defeating Harry Strom's Social Credit Party, which had governed for 36 years
- September 10 – Peter Lougheed becomes premier of Alberta, replacing Harry Strom
- October 4 – Petroleum is found under Sable Island
- October 21 – Ontario election: Bill Davis's PCs win an eighth consecutive majority
- November 1 – The Toronto Sun begins publication
- November 1 – The Body Politic, Canada's first significant gay magazine, publishes its first issue.
- November 2 – Gerhard Herzberg wins the Nobel Prize in Chemistry
- November 12 – Air Canada Flight 812 is hijacked. Paul Joseph Cini is later arrested without incident.
- December 1 – A moving Montreal Metro train crashes into a second parked train, killing one person.
- December 26 – Air Canada Flight 932 is hijacked by Patrick Critton and flown to Cuba.

=== Full date unknown ===
- Ontario Universities Application Centre founded
- The first edition of The Canadian Rockies Trail Guide is published
- Conrad Black and David Radler buy the Sherbrooke Record
- Statistics Canada is formed to replace the Dominion Bureau of Statistics

== Arts and literature ==
- July 1 - Joyce Wieland's "True Patriot Love" opens at the National Gallery of Canada. It is the Gallery's first solo exhibition devoted to the work of a living Canadian woman artist.
- August 15 - The first Banff Festival of the Arts opens.

=== New works ===
- Alice Munro: Lives of Girls and Women
- Margaret Atwood: Power Politics
- Milton Acorn: I Shout Love and On Shaving Off His Beard
- Mordecai Richler: St. Urbain's Horseman
- Joan Haggerty: Daughters of the Moon
- Gordon R. Dickson: Tactics of Mistake
- Brian Fawcett: Friends

=== Awards ===
- See 1971 Governor General's Awards for a complete list of winners and finalists for those awards.
- Stephen Leacock Award: Robert Thomas Allen, Wives, Children & Other Wild Life
- Vicky Metcalf Award: Kay Hill

== Sport ==
- January 18 – Ivan Koloff (Oreal Donald Perras) defeats Bruno Sammartino ending Sammartino's seven-and-a-half-year reign and became the first Canadian WWWF World Heavyweight Champion
- March 13 – The Toronto Varsity Blues win their fifth (and third consecutive) University Cup by defeating the Saint Mary's Huskies 5 to 4. All games were played at Sudbury Community Arena
- May 18 – The Montreal Canadiens win their 17th Stanley Cup by defeating the Chicago Black Hawks 4 games to 3. Hamilton's Ken Dryden is awarded the Conn Smythe Trophy
- May 19 – The Quebec Junior Hockey League's Quebec Remparts win their won their first Memorial Cup by defeating the Western Canada Hockey League's Edmonton Oil Kings 2 game to 0. All games were played at the Colisée de Québec
- June 3 – Montreal's Tarzan Tyler (Camille Tourville) becomes one half of the first World Wide Wrestling Federation Tag Team Champions (with Luke Graham) by defeating The Sheik (Ed Farhat) and Dick the Bruiser (William Richard Afflis) at the Joe Brown Center in New Orleans
- November 20 – The Western Ontario Mustangs win their first Vanier Cup by defeating the Alberta Golden Bears by a score of 15–14 in the 7th Vanier Cup played at Varsity Stadium in Toronto
- November 28 – The Calgary Stampeders win their second (and first since 1948) Grey Cup by defeating the Toronto Argonauts 14 to 11 in the 59th Grey Cup played in Vancouver's Empire Stadium
- December 6 – Quebec City's Rene Goulet becomes the second Canadian to win World Wrestling Federation Tag Team Champion (with Karl Gotch) by defeating Luke Graham and Tarzan Tyler at Madison Square Garden in New York City

Date unknown

- Disc sport pioneer Ken Westerfield immigrates to Canada
- Harold Ballard gains full control of the Toronto Maple Leafs.

== Births ==
=== January to June ===
- January 3 - Cory Cross, ice hockey player
- January 9
  - Hal Niedzviecki, author and critic
  - Scott Thornton, ice hockey player
- January 18 - Seamus O'Regan, broadcast journalist and television co-host
- January 23 - Carla Robinson, television journalist
- January 27 - Patrice Brisebois, ice hockey player
- February 17 - Martyn Bennett, musician (d. 2005)
- February 24 - Brian Savage, ice hockey player and coach
- February 25 - Daniel Powter, singer
- March 6 - Val Venis, professional wrestler
- March 8 - Bob Boughner, ice hockey player
- March 20 - Janis Kelly, volleyball player
- March 27 - Nathan Fillion, actor
- April 1 - Danielle Smith, journalist and politician
- April 2 - Conrad Leinemann, beach volleyball player
- April 4 - Steph St. Laurent, documentary filmmaker, videographer, photographer, actor, writer, environmentalist, and activist
- April 9 - Jacques Villeneuve, motor racing driver
- April 19 - Scott McCord, voice actor
- June 8 - Jeff Douglas, actor
- June 15 - Bif Naked, rock singer-songwriter, poet, cartoonist and actress
- June 26 - Christine Nordhagen, wrestler
- June 26 - Edward Parenti, swimmer
- June 29 - Matthew Good, musician
- June 30
  - Megan Fahlenbock, voice actress
  - Jamie McLennan, retired professional ice hockey goaltender, radio sports analyst

=== July to September ===
- July 2 - Evelyn Lau, poet and novelist
- July 10 - Adam Foote, ice hockey player
- July 17 - Cory Doctorow, blogger, journalist and science fiction author
- July 20 - Sandra Oh, actress
- July 30 - Tom Green, actor, rapper, writer, comedian and media personality
- August 12
  - Patrick Carpentier, racing driver
  - Phil Western, musician (d. 2019)
- August 25 - Peter Oldring, voice actor, improviser, actor and comedian
- September - Chris Klein-Beekman, aid worker killed in Iraq (d. 2003)
- September 6 - Fiona Milne, rower and World Champion

=== October to December ===
- October 1 - Guylaine Cloutier, swimmer
- October 5 - Sam Vincent, voice actor and singer
- October 7 - Todd Smith, Ontario MPP
- October 15 - Jamie Nicholls, Politician
- October 21 - Johanne Bégin, water polo player
- November 24 - Keith Primeau, ice hockey player
- December 9 - Petr Nedvěd, ice hockey player
- December 14 - Scott Koskie, volleyball player
- December 22 - Pat Mastroianni, actor
- December 23 -
  - Corey Haim, actor (d. 2010)
  - Estella Warren, actress, former fashion model, and former synchronized swimmer
- December 25 - Justin Trudeau, politician and 23rd prime minister of Canada

== Deaths ==
=== January to June ===
- January 5 - Douglas Shearer, sound designer and recording director (b.1899)
- January 19 - David Florida, pioneer in space research
- February 4 - Brock Chisholm, doctor and first Director-General of the World Health Organization (b.1896)
- March 25 - Anne Savage, painter and art teacher (b.1896)
- April 5 - Maurice Brasset, politician and lawyer (b.1884)
- April 14 - Hector Authier, politician, lawyer and news reporter/announcer (b.1881)
- April 17 - Carmen Lombardo, singer and composer (b.1903)
- April 19 - Earl Thomson, athlete and Olympic gold medalist (b.1895)
- May 2 - John Horne Blackmore, politician (b.1890)
- May 3 - Georges Poulin, hockey player (b. 1887)
- June 19 - Albert A. Brown, politician and lawyer (b.1895)

=== July to December ===
- July 10 - Samuel Bronfman, businessman (b.1889)
- July 22 - Ross Thatcher, politician and 9th Premier of Saskatchewan (b.1917)
- July 28 – Annon Lee Silver, lyric soprano (b.1938)
- September 4 - James Gladstone, first Status Indian to be appointed to the Senate of Canada (b.1887)
- November 17 - Arthur Roebuck, politician and labour lawyer (b.1878)
- November 25 - Leonard W. Murray, naval officer (b.1896)
- December 11 - Kate Aitken, radio journalist, cookbook writer (b.1891)

== See also ==
- 1971 in Canadian television
- List of Canadian films of 1971
