= 1968 in Canada =

- Decades: 1940s; 1950s; 1960s; 1970s; 1980s
- See also: History of Canada; Timeline of Canadian history; List of years in Canada

Events from the year 1968 in Canada.

== Incumbents ==
=== Crown ===
- Monarch – Elizabeth II

=== Federal government ===
- Governor General – Roland Michener
- Prime Minister – Lester B. Pearson (until April 20) then Pierre Trudeau
- Chief Justice – John Robert Cartwright (Ontario)
- Parliament – 27th (until April 23) then 28th (from September 12)

=== Provincial governments ===
==== Lieutenant governors ====
- Lieutenant Governor of Alberta – Grant MacEwan
- Lieutenant Governor of British Columbia – George Pearkes (until July 2) then John Robert Nicholson
- Lieutenant Governor of Manitoba – Richard Spink Bowles
- Lieutenant Governor of New Brunswick – John B. McNair (until January 31) then Wallace Samuel Bird
- Lieutenant Governor of Newfoundland – Fabian O'Dea
- Lieutenant Governor of Nova Scotia – Henry Poole MacKeen (until July 22) then Victor de Bedia Oland
- Lieutenant Governor of Ontario – William Earl Rowe (until July 4) then William Ross Macdonald
- Lieutenant Governor of Prince Edward Island – Willibald Joseph MacDonald
- Lieutenant Governor of Quebec – Hugues Lapointe
- Lieutenant Governor of Saskatchewan – Robert Hanbidge

==== Premiers ====
- Premier of Alberta – Ernest Manning (until December 12) and then Harry Strom
- Premier of British Columbia – W.A.C. Bennett
- Premier of Manitoba – Walter Weir
- Premier of New Brunswick – Louis Robichaud
- Premier of Newfoundland – Joey Smallwood
- Premier of Nova Scotia – G.I. Smith
- Premier of Ontario – John Robarts
- Premier of Prince Edward Island – Alexander B. Campbell
- Premier of Quebec – Daniel Johnson, Sr. (until September 26) and then Jean-Jacques Bertrand (from October 2)
- Premier of Saskatchewan – Ross Thatcher

=== Territorial governments ===
==== Commissioners ====
- Commissioner of Yukon – James Smith
- Commissioner of Northwest Territories – Stuart Milton Hodgson

== Events ==
=== January to June ===
- February 1 – The three branches of the Canadian Forces are merged into one, adopting a common green uniform and Army-derived ranks
- February 20 – Prime Minister Pearson gives the first ever televised address to the nation as he tells Canadians that he will table a confidence motion the next day to prove his party still has control. After a week of filibustering by the Opposition, the motion passes.
- April 1 – The Canadian Radio-television and Telecommunications Commission (CRTC) is formed
- April 6 – Pierre Trudeau wins 1968 Liberal Party leadership election
- May 14 – The grand opening of the Toronto-Dominion Centre is held
- June 1 – The flag of Alberta is authorized
- June 24 – Separatists riot in Montreal on S^{t}-Jean-Baptiste Day
- June 25 – Federal election: Pierre Trudeau's Liberals win a majority

=== July to December ===
- July 1 – The laws creating Canada's Medicare system come into effect
- July 18–August 9 – Canada Post workers represented by the Canadian Union of Postal Workers go on strike
- August 20 – Warsaw Pact troops invade Czechoslovakia to end the "Prague Spring" of political liberalization. Thousands of refugees flee to Canada.
- September 26 – Daniel Johnson, Sr, Premier of Quebec, dies in office
- October 2 – Jean-Jacques Bertrand becomes premier of Quebec
- October 15 – The Mouvement Souveraineté-Association merges with the Ralliement National to create the Parti Québécois, René Lévesque is selected as the party's first leader
- December 12 – Harry Strom becomes premier of Alberta, replacing Ernest Manning
- December 31 – Quebec's Legislative Assembly is renamed the National Assembly

=== Full date unknown ===
- IMAX technique invented
- Canada's new Divorce Act introduces no fault divorce
- The Rochdale College experiment begins in Toronto

== Arts and literature ==
=== New works ===
- Alice Munro – Dance of the Happy Shades
- Mordecai Richler – Hunting Tigers Under Glass
- Robert Fulford – This Was Expo
- John Newlove – Black Night Window
- Kildare Dobbs – Reading the Time
- Mordecai Richler – Cocksure
- Robert Kroetsch – Alberta
- Marian Engel – No Clouds of Glory
- Gordon R. Dickson – Soldier, Ask Not
- Farley Mowat – This Rock Within the Sea: A Heritage Lost

=== Poetry ===
- Margaret Atwood – The Animals in That Country
- Mary Alice Downie and Barbara Robertson, editors, The Wind Has Wings, anthology of 77 Canadian poems for children (anthology)
- Dennis Lee, editor, T. O. Now, anthology of 13 "apprentice poets living in Toronto" (anthology)
- Joe Rosenblatt, Winter of the Luna Moon
- Irving Layton, The Shattered Plinths, 60 new poems
- Leonard Cohen, Selected Poems, 1956-1968
- Al Purdy, Wild Grape Wine
- Dorothy Livesay, The Documentaries, poems from the 1930s and 1940s, and including "Roots", a long poem

=== Awards ===
- David Suzuki wins UNESCO's Kalinga Prize for science writing
- See 1968 Governor General's Awards for a complete list of winners and finalists for those awards.
- Stephen Leacock Award: Max Ferguson, And Now...Here's Max
- Vicky Metcalf Award: Lorraine McLaughlin

=== Theatre ===
- August 28 – Michel Tremblay's Les Belles-Sœurs premiers in Montreal.

=== Art ===
- December 18 – Henry Moore donates hundreds of works to the Art Gallery of Ontario.

== Sport ==
- March 10 – The Alberta Golden Bears win their second University Cup by defeating the Loyola Warriors 5 to 4. The final game was played at the Montreal Forum
- May 11 – The Montreal Canadiens win their 15th Stanley Cup by defeating the St. Louis Blues 4 games to 0. The deciding Game 4 was played at the Montreal Forum. Jean Béliveau wins his second Conn Smythe Trophy
- May 27 – The Montreal Expos are established as Major League Baseball's first Canadian team.
- November 22 – The Queen's Golden Gaels win their first Vanier Cup by defeating the Waterloo Lutheran Golden Hawks by a score of 42–14 in the 4th Vanier Cup played at Varsity Stadium in Toronto
- November 29 – The Ottawa Rough Riders win their sixth Grey Cup by defeating the Calgary Stampeders 24 to 21 in the 56th Grey Cup played at Exhibition Stadium in Toronto

== Births ==
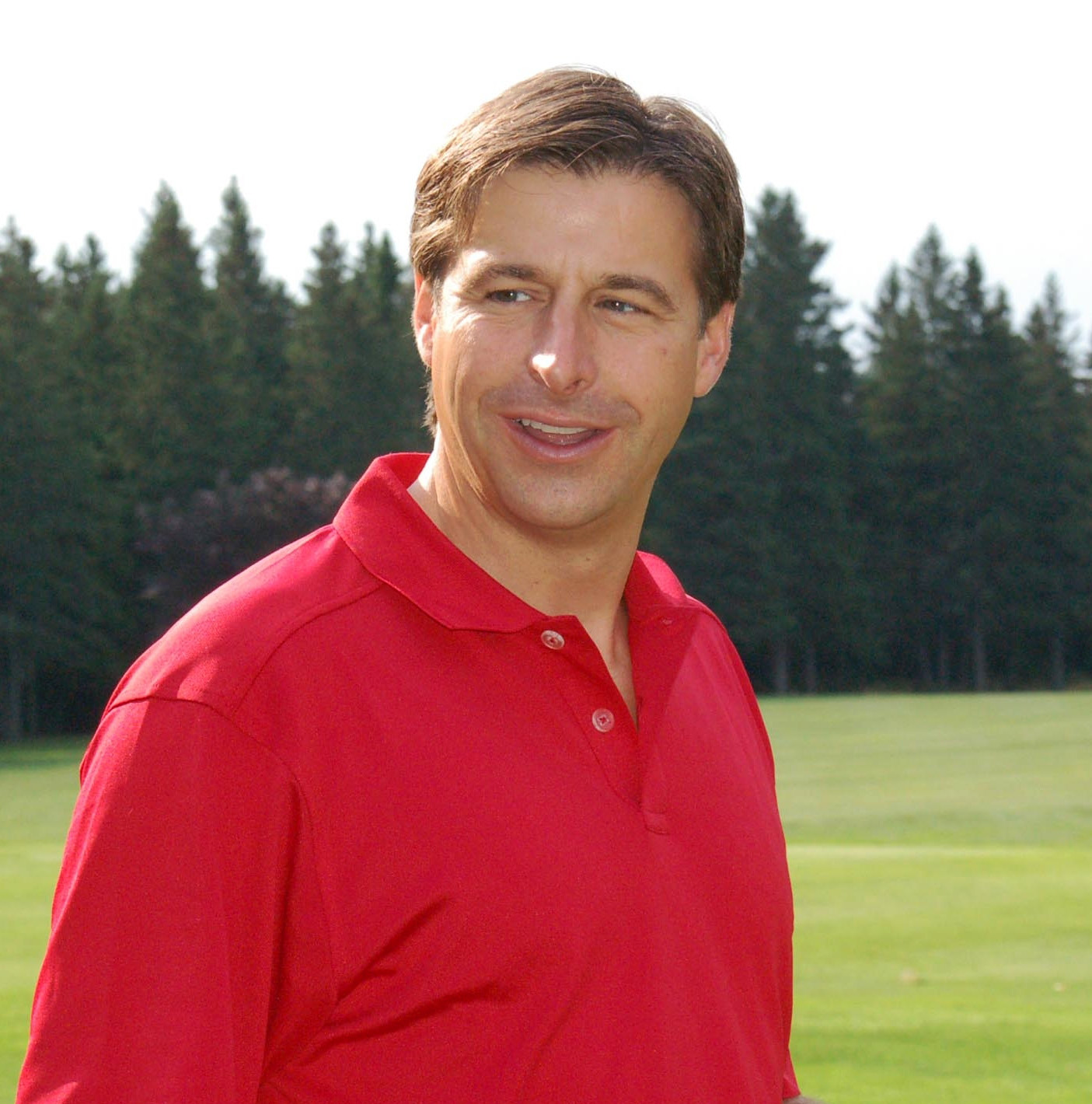
Shawn Graham in 2007

=== January to March ===
- January 1 – Darren Greer, writer
- January 5 – Joé Juneau, ice hockey player
- January 7 – Tara Croxford, field hockey player
- January 13 – Pat Onstad, international soccer player
- January 14 – Michael Meldrum, swimmer
- January 19 - Matt Hill, voice actor
- January 28 – Sarah McLachlan, musician, singer and songwriter
- February 1 – Mark Recchi, ice hockey player
- February 7 – Mark Tewksbury, swimmer, Olympic champion
- February 9 – Joel Brough, field hockey player
- February 22 – Shawn Graham, politician and 31st Premier of New Brunswick
- February 27 – Matt Stairs, baseball player
- March 14 – Megan Follows, Canadian-American actress
- March 17 – Patty Sullivan, television personality
- March 19 – Liam Jewell, sprint canoer
- March 30 – Celine Dion, singer, songwriter and actress

=== April to June ===
- April 12 – Adam Graves, ice hockey player
- April 18 – David Hewlett, UK-born actor
- April 20 – Evan Solomon, writer, magazine publisher and television host
- May 8 – Louise Stratten, actress and younger sister of the murdered actress Dorothy Stratten
- May 12 – Jane Kerr, swimmer
- May 14 – Mary DePiero, diver
- May 20 – William Irwin, boxer
- May 30 – Jason Kenney, politician and Minister
- June 1 – Jeff Hackett, ice hockey player and coach
- June 7 – Macha Grenon, actress
- June 10 – Susan Haskell, actress
- June 16 – Lyne Poirier, judoka
- June 27 – Pascale Bussières, actress
- June 29 – Theoren Fleury, ice hockey player

=== July to September ===
- July 11 – Michael Cram, actor and singer-songwriter
- July 12 – Paul Hopkins, actor
- July 21 – Lyle Odelein, ice hockey player (d. 2026)
- July 22 – Harry Taylor, swimmer
- July 23 – Shawn Levy, director and producer
- August 5 – Terri Clark, country music singer
- August 10 – Greg Hawgood, ice hockey player
- August 20 – Jody Holden, beach volleyball player
- September 9 – Lisa Lougheed, singer and actress
- September 19 – Shawn Doyle, actor
- September 20 – Leah Pinsent, actress
- September 22 – Lisa Alexander, synchronised swimmer
- September 23 – Donna McGinnis, swimmer

=== October to December ===
- October 2 – Sandy Goss, swimmer
- October 2 – Glen Wesley, ice hockey player
- October 26 – Tom Cavanagh, actor
- November 1 – Andrea Nugent, swimmer
- November 3 – Debbie Rochon, actress
- November 5 – Terry McGurrin, actor, comedian and writer
- November 14 – Serge Postigo, actor
- November 19 – Gord Fraser, road racing cyclist
- November 25 – Jill Hennessy, actress and musician, and Jacqueline Hennessy, actress and journalist
- December 2 – Darren Ward, swimmer
- December 3 – Brendan Fraser, actor
- December 10 – Caroline Wittrin, hammer thrower
- December 17 – Paul Tracy, racing car driver

== Deaths ==
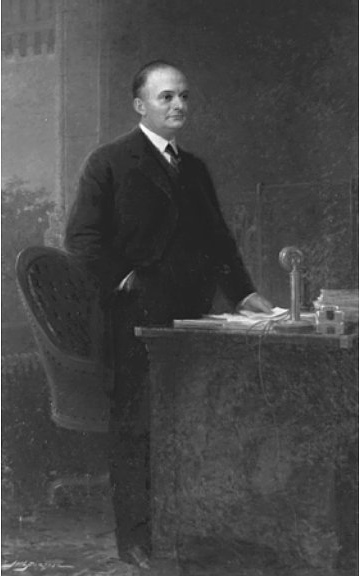
Ernest Charles Drury

- January 31 – George Arthur Brethen, politician (b.1877)
- February 5 – Frances Loring, sculptor (b.1887)
- February 13 – Portia White, singer (b.1911)
- February 16 – Healey Willan, organist and composer (b.1880)
- February 17 – Ernest Charles Drury, politician, writer and 8th Premier of Ontario (b.1878)
- March 10 - William John Rose, historian
- March 22 - Margaret Duley, Newfoundland author
- April 29 – Aubin-Edmond Arsenault, politician and Premier of Prince Edward Island (b.1870)
- May 30 – Charles Gavan Power, politician, Minister and Senator (b.1888)
- June 14 – John B. McNair, lawyer, politician, judge and 22nd Lieutenant Governor of New Brunswick (b.1889)
- August 1 – Maurice Spector, Chairman of the Communist Party of Canada (b.1898)
- August 14 - Olivier Maurault, French-Canadian historian
- August 21 – Germaine Guèvremont, French-Canadian writer (b.1893)
- September 26 – Daniel Johnson, Sr., politician and 20th Premier of Quebec (b.1915)
- December 15 – Antonio Barrette, politician and 18th Premier of Quebec (b.1899)

== See also ==
- 1968 in Canadian television
- List of Canadian films
