= 1827 in Canada =

- Decades: 1800s; 1810s; 1820s; 1830s; 1840s
- See also: History of Canada; Timeline of Canadian history; List of years in Canada

Events from the year 1827 in Canada.

== Incumbents ==
- Monarch: George IV

=== Federal government ===
- Parliament of Lower Canada: 12th (until July 5), 13th (starting November 20)
- Parliament of Upper Canada: 9th

=== Governors ===
- Governor of the Canadas: Robert Milnes
- Governor of New Brunswick: Howard Douglas
- Governor of Nova Scotia: John Coape Sherbrooke
- Civil Governor of Newfoundland: Thomas John Cochrane
- Governor of Prince Edward Island: Charles Douglass Smith

== Events ==
- March 15 – The University of Toronto is chartered
- First temperance society in Canada formed in Montreal
- Elections overwhelmingly in favour of the Parti Patriote much to the annoyance of the British.
- 87,000 people in Lower Canada sign a petition denouncing the political abuses of the Château Clique.

== Births ==
- January 3 – Letitia Youmans, temperance advocate (died 1896)
- January 7 – Sandford Fleming, engineer and inventor (died 1915)
- February 28 – Albert Lacombe, missionary (died 1916)
- April 16 – Octave Crémazie, poet (died 1879)
- August 22 – Ezra Butler Eddy, businessman
- October 21 – Charles Laberge, lawyer, journalist and politician (died 1874)
- November 17 – William Evan Price, businessman and politician (died 1880)
- December 27 – Pierre-Alexis Tremblay, politician (died 1879)

== Deaths ==
- August 31 – Jean Boudreau, politician
