= 1830 in Canada =

- Decades: 1810s; 1820s; 1830s; 1840s; 1850s
- See also: History of Canada; Timeline of Canadian history; List of years in Canada

Events from the year 1830 in Canada.

== Incumbents ==
- Monarch: George IV (until June 26), then William IV

=== Federal government ===
- Parliament of Lower Canada: 13th
- Parliament of Upper Canada: 10th (until March 6)

=== Governors ===
- Governor of the Canadas: James Kempt
- Governor of New Brunswick: Howard Douglas
- Governor of Nova Scotia: Thomas Nickleson Jeffery
- Civil Governor of Newfoundland: Thomas John Cochrane
- Governor of Prince Edward Island: John Ready

== Events ==
- Influenza epidemic strikes tribes of British Columbia.
- Canada is divided into counties.
- William Lyon Mackenzie re-elected to the Assembly with a Reform minority.
- Ridout's Hardware Store, later known as Aikenhead's Hardware opens in Toronto.
- The Grand Orange Lodge of British North America was founded in Ontario by Ogle Robert Gowan.

== Births ==
- March 1 – James Armstrong, politician (died 1893)
- August 7 – Thomas White, journalist and politician (died 1888)
- November 18 – Michel Auger, politician (died 1909)

=== Full date unknown ===
- Crowfoot, a chief of the Siksika First Nation (died 1890)
- Benjamin Allen, politician (died 1912)

== Deaths ==
- June 24 – François Blanchet, author, physician, teacher, militia officer, businessman, seigneur, politician, office holder (born 1776)
- September 6 – Abraham Erb, Mennonite settler and miller who founded Waterloo, Ontario (born 1772)
