= 1832 in Canada =

- Decades: 1810s; 1820s; 1830s; 1840s; 1850s
- See also: History of Canada; Timeline of Canadian history; List of years in Canada

Events from the year 1832 in Canada.

== Incumbents ==
- Monarch: William IV

=== Federal government ===
- Parliament of Lower Canada: 14th
- Parliament of Upper Canada: 11th

=== Governors ===
- Governor of the Canadas: James Kempt
- Governor of New Brunswick: Sir Archibald Campbell, 1st Baronet
- Governor of Nova Scotia: Thomas Nickleson Jeffery
- Civil Governor of Newfoundland: Thomas John Cochrane
- Governor of Prince Edward Island: John Ready

== Events ==
- January 1 – William Lyon Mackenzie readmitted into the Legislative Assembly after being expelled
- February 25 – The first railway charter in Canada is issued for the Champlain and St. Lawrence Railroad.
- March – Attempted assassination of William Lyon Mackenzie at Hamilton.
- March 30 – Bank of Nova Scotia is founded
- May 21 – Election riots at Montreal. Three supporters of Daniel Tracey of the Parti Patriote are shot dead by government troops. Colonel MacIntosh and Captain Temple are arrested for ordering the shooting. The next day, it is announced that Tracey is elected to the Legislative Assembly for Montreal West.
- June – The immigrant ship The Carrick arrives in Quebec filled with Irish immigrants. A few of these immigrants are ill with cholera, which becomes an epidemic in Lower Canada and Upper Canada.
- June 20 – Eighty-eight deaths from Asiatic cholera are reported at Montreal.
- November – 1832 Newfoundland general election.
- December – A meeting, at Toronto, proposes annexation of the District of Montreal to Upper Canada.

=== Full date unknown ===
- 7,800 French-Canadians are killed by the cholera epidemic – 3,800 in Quebec and 4,000 in Montreal. Meetings of French Canadians attribute the cholera to British immigrants, 52 000 having arrived in that same year.
- The City of Montreal is incorporated. Heretofore an out-port of Quebec, it becomes a port of entry.
- William Lyon Mackenzie leaves for England with 25,000 names on the petition advocating more powers for elected representatives, with little result. He is expelled from the Assembly and re-elected while away.
- The Rideau Canal is opened after six years of construction.

== Births ==
- January 1 – David Oppenheimer, entrepreneur and 2 Mayor of Vancouver (died 1897)
- January 9 – Félix-Gabriel Marchand, journalist, author, notary, politician and 11th Premier of Quebec (died 1900)
- March 27 – Benjamin Pâquet, Roman Catholic priest and educationist (died 1900)
- April 30 – Wilfrid Prévost, lawyer and politician (died 1898)
- August 15 – Lucius Richard O'Brien, painter (died 1899)

== Deaths ==
- July 18 – Daniel Tracey, doctor, journalist and politician (born 1794)
