= 1831 in Canada =

- Decades: 1810s; 1820s; 1830s; 1840s; 1850s
- See also: History of Canada; Timeline of Canadian history; List of years in Canada

Events from the year 1831 in Canada.

== Incumbents ==
- Monarch: William IV

=== Federal government ===
- Parliament of Lower Canada: 14th (starting January 21)
- Parliament of Upper Canada: 11th (starting January 7)

=== Governors ===
- Governor of the Canadas: James Kempt
- Governor of New Brunswick: Howard Douglas
- Governor of Nova Scotia: Thomas Nickleson Jeffery
- Civil Governor of Newfoundland: Thomas John Cochrane
- Governor of Prince Edward Island: John Ready

== Events ==
- A charter for a railway, from La Prairie, Quebec to St. John's, is granted; it will be the first railway in Canada.
- Massive Patriote campaign to petition the king for reforms.
- Male Jews were extended full political and religious rights.
- Many African-Canadians were protesting at the time about voting rights, although these weren't granted to them until 7 years later.

== Births ==
- February 1 – Francis Evans Cornish, politician (died 1878)
- February 14 – Camille Lefebvre (died 1895)
- March 18 – David Mills, politician, author, poet and jurist (died 1903)
- April 17 – John Macoun, naturalist (died 1920)
- May 1 – Emily Stowe, first female doctor to practice in Canada and women's rights and suffrage activist (died 1903)
- May 17 – Robert Machray, clergyman, missionary and first Primate of the Church of England in Canada (died 1904)
- July 30 – Simon Hugh Holmes, publisher, lawyer, politician and Premier of Nova Scotia (died 1919)
- August 16 – John Jones Ross, politician and Premier of Quebec (died 1901)

== Deaths ==
- October 26 : Jacques Labrie, physician and politician
