= 1829 in Canada =

- Decades: 1800s; 1810s; 1820s; 1830s; 1840s
- See also: History of Canada; Timeline of Canadian history; List of years in Canada

Events from the year 1829 in Canada.

== Incumbents ==
- Monarch: George IV

=== Federal government ===
- 13th Parliament of Lower Canada
- 10th Parliament of Upper Canada

=== Governors ===
- Governor-General of the Province of Canada: James Kempt
- Lieutenant-Governor of New Brunswick: Sir Howard Douglas
- Governor of Nova Scotia: Thomas Nickleson Jeffery
- Colonial Governor of Newfoundland: Thomas John Cochrane
- Lieutenant-Governor of Prince Edward Island: John Ready

== Events ==
- January 4 – Sir John Colborne, Lieutenant Governor of Upper Canada founds Upper Canada College, as a feeder school to the newly formed University of Toronto and a home for the colony's upper class.
- November 30 – Construction of the First Welland Canal is completed (construction to begin again in 1831)

== Births ==
- May 28 – A. B. Rogers, surveyor (died 1889)
- June 7 – Joseph Godéric Blanchet, politician (died 1890)
- July 10 – Louis-Adélard Senécal, businessman and politician (died 1887)
- August 1 – John James Fraser, lawyer, judge, politician and 4th Premier of New Brunswick (died 1896)
- December 5 – Henri-Gustave Joly de Lotbinière, politician, Minister, 4th Premier of Quebec and Lieutenant Governor of British Columbia (died 1908)

== Deaths ==
- June 6 – Shanawdithit, last recorded surviving member of the Beothuk people of Newfoundland (b. c1801)
