= 1887 in Canada =

- Decades: 1860s; 1870s; 1880s; 1890s; 1900s
- See also: History of Canada; Timeline of Canadian history; List of years in Canada

Events from the year 1887 in Canada.

== Incumbents ==
=== Crown ===
- Monarch – Victoria

=== Federal government ===
- Governor General – Henry Petty-Fitzmaurice
- Prime Minister – John A. Macdonald
- Chief Justice – William Johnstone Ritchie (New Brunswick)
- Parliament – 5th (until 15 January) then 6th (from 13 April)

=== Provincial governments ===
==== Lieutenant governors ====
- Lieutenant Governor of British Columbia – Clement Francis Cornwall (until February 8) then Hugh Nelson
- Lieutenant Governor of Manitoba – James Cox Aikins
- Lieutenant Governor of New Brunswick – Samuel Leonard Tilley
- Lieutenant Governor of Nova Scotia – Matthew Henry Richey
- Lieutenant Governor of Ontario – John Beverley Robinson (until June 1) then Alexander Campbell
- Lieutenant Governor of Prince Edward Island – Andrew Archibald Macdonald
- Lieutenant Governor of Quebec – Louis-Rodrigue Masson (until October 4) then Auguste-Réal Angers

==== Premiers ====
- Premier of British Columbia – William Smithe (until March 28) then Alexander Edmund Batson Davie (from April 1)
- Premier of Manitoba – John Norquay (until December 26) then David Howard Harrison
- Premier of New Brunswick – Andrew George Blair
- Premier of Nova Scotia – William Stevens Fielding
- Premier of Ontario – Oliver Mowat
- Premier of Prince Edward Island – William Wilfred Sullivan
- Premier of Quebec – John Jones Ross (until January 25) then Louis-Olivier Taillon (January 25 to January 27) then Honoré Mercier

=== Territorial governments ===
==== Lieutenant governors ====
- Lieutenant Governor of Keewatin – James Cox Aikins
- Lieutenant Governor of the North-West Territories – Edgar Dewdney

== Events ==
- January 25 – Sir Louis-Olivier Taillon becomes premier of Quebec, replacing John Jones Ross.
- January 27 – Honoré Mercier becomes premier of Quebec, replacing Sir Louis-Olivier Taillon.
- February 22 – Federal election: Sir John A. Macdonald's Conservatives win a third consecutive majority.
- March 3 – The United States imposes the Fisheries Retaliation Act putting limits on Canadian fishermen and traders
- March 28 – William Smithe, Premier of British Columbia, dies in office.
- April 1 – Alexander Davie becomes premier of British Columbia.
- April 23 – McMaster University founded
- May 3 – 148 coal miners are killed in a mine explosion near Nanaimo, British Columbia
- June 7 – Wilfrid Laurier becomes leader of the Liberal Party of Canada
- June 20 – Golden Jubilee of Victoria's accession as Queen
- December 3 – Saturday Night founded
- December 26 – David H. Harrison becomes premier of Manitoba, replacing John Norquay.
- The first premiers' conference is held at Quebec City, Quebec

== Births ==
=== January to June ===
- January 21 – Georges Vézina, ice hockey player (d.1926)
- February 20 – Vincent Massey, lawyer, diplomat and Governor General of Canada (d.1967)
- February 25 – Andrew McNaughton, army officer, politician and diplomat (d.1966)
- April 13 – Gordon S. Fahrni, medical doctor (d.1995)
- May 21 – James Gladstone, first Status Indian to be appointed to the Senate of Canada (d.1971)

=== July to December ===
- July 4 – Tom Longboat, long-distance runner (d.1949)
- July 5 – Joseph Charles-Émile Trudeau, entrepreneur and father of Pierre Trudeau, who would later become Prime Minister of Canada (d.1935)
- September 17 – Georges Poulin, hockey player (d. 1971)
- October 8 – Huntley Gordon, actor (d. 1956)
- October 14 – Frances Loring, sculptor (d.1968)
- December 20 – Walter Russell Shaw, politician and Premier of Prince Edward Island (d.1981)

== Deaths ==
- February 25 – Augustin-Magloire Blanchet, missionary (b.1797)
- March 28 – William Smithe, politician and 6th Premier of British Columbia (b.1842)
- May 4 – William Murdoch, poet (b.1823)
- May 8 – Sir William Young, Premier of Nova Scotia (b.1799)
- June 25 – Matthew Crooks Cameron, lawyer, judge and politician (b.1822)
- August 18 – John Palliser, explorer and geographer (b.1817)
- October 11 – Louis-Adélard Senécal, businessman and politician (b.1829)
- October 12 – William Annand, 2nd Premier of Nova Scotia (b.1808)
