= 1833 in Canada =

- Decades: 1810s; 1820s; 1830s; 1840s; 1850s
- See also: History of Canada; Timeline of Canadian history; List of years in Canada

Events from the year 1833 in Canada.

== Incumbents ==
- Monarch: William IV

=== Federal government ===
- Parliament of Lower Canada: 14th
- Parliament of Upper Canada: 11th

=== Governors ===
- Governor of the Canadas: Matthew Whitworth-Aylmer, 5th Baron Aylmer
- Governor of New Brunswick: Sir Archibald Campbell, 1st Baronet
- Governor of Nova Scotia: Thomas Nickleson Jeffery
- Civil Governor of Newfoundland: Thomas John Cochrane
- Governor of Prince Edward Island: Murray Maxwell
- Governor of Upper Canada: John Colborne

== Events ==
- September – William Lyon Mackenzie returns from the United Kingdom.
- September 19 – Military riot at Montreal.
- November 13 – Meteor showers at Niagara, Ontario.
- November to December – William Lyon Mackenzie expelled three times and re-elected twice.
- Royal William, formerly operating between Quebec and Halifax, becomes first steamship to cross Atlantic.

== Births ==
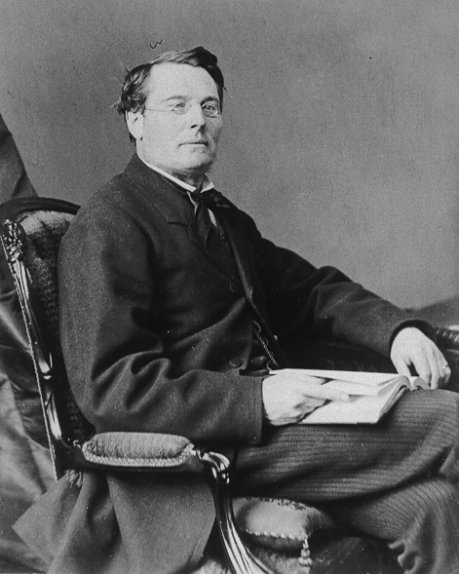
Edward Blake

- April 22 – John Waldie, politician (died 1907)
- July 7 – Henry Joseph Clarke, lawyer, politician and 3rd Premier of Manitoba (died 1889)
- September 3 – Byron Moffatt Britton, politician, lawyer and lecturer (died 1920)
- September 15 – Alexander Roberts Dunn, first Canadian awarded the Victoria Cross (died 1868)
- October 13 – Edward Blake, politician and 2nd Premier of Ontario (died 1912)
- November 24 – Antoine Labelle, priest and settler (died 1891)
- December 10 – George Haddow, politician and merchant (died 1919)

== Deaths ==
- March 3 – James Bardin Palmer, land agent, lawyer, office holder, and politician (born 1771)
- November 20 – Joel Stone, founder of Gananoque, Ontario (born 1749)
