= 1889 in Canada =

- Decades: 1860s; 1870s; 1880s; 1890s; 1900s
- See also: History of Canada; Timeline of Canadian history; List of years in Canada

Events from the year 1889 in Canada.

== Incumbents ==
=== Crown ===
- Monarch – Victoria

=== Federal government ===
- Governor General – Frederick Stanley
- Prime Minister – John A. Macdonald
- Chief Justice – William Johnstone Ritchie (New Brunswick)
- Parliament – 6th

=== Provincial governments ===
==== Lieutenant governors ====
- Lieutenant Governor of British Columbia – Hugh Nelson
- Lieutenant Governor of Manitoba – John Christian Schultz
- Lieutenant Governor of New Brunswick – Samuel Leonard Tilley
- Lieutenant Governor of Nova Scotia – Archibald McLelan
- Lieutenant Governor of Ontario – Alexander Campbell
- Lieutenant Governor of Prince Edward Island – A.A. Macdonald (until September 2) then Jedediah Slason Carvell
- Lieutenant Governor of Quebec – Auguste-Réal Angers

==== Premiers ====
- Premier of British Columbia – Alexander Edmund Batson Davie (until August 1) then John Robson (from August 2)
- Premier of Manitoba – Thomas Greenway
- Premier of New Brunswick – Andrew George Blair
- Premier of Nova Scotia – William Stevens Fielding
- Premier of Ontario – Oliver Mowat
- Premier of Prince Edward Island – William Wilfred Sullivan (until November 1) then Neil McLeod
- Premier of Quebec – Honoré Mercier

=== Territorial governments ===
==== Lieutenant governors ====
- Lieutenant Governor of Keewatin – John Christian Schultz
- Lieutenant Governor of the North-West Territories – Joseph Royal

==== Premiers ====
- Chairman of the Lieutenant-Governor's Advisory Council of the North-West Territories – Robert Brett

== Events ==
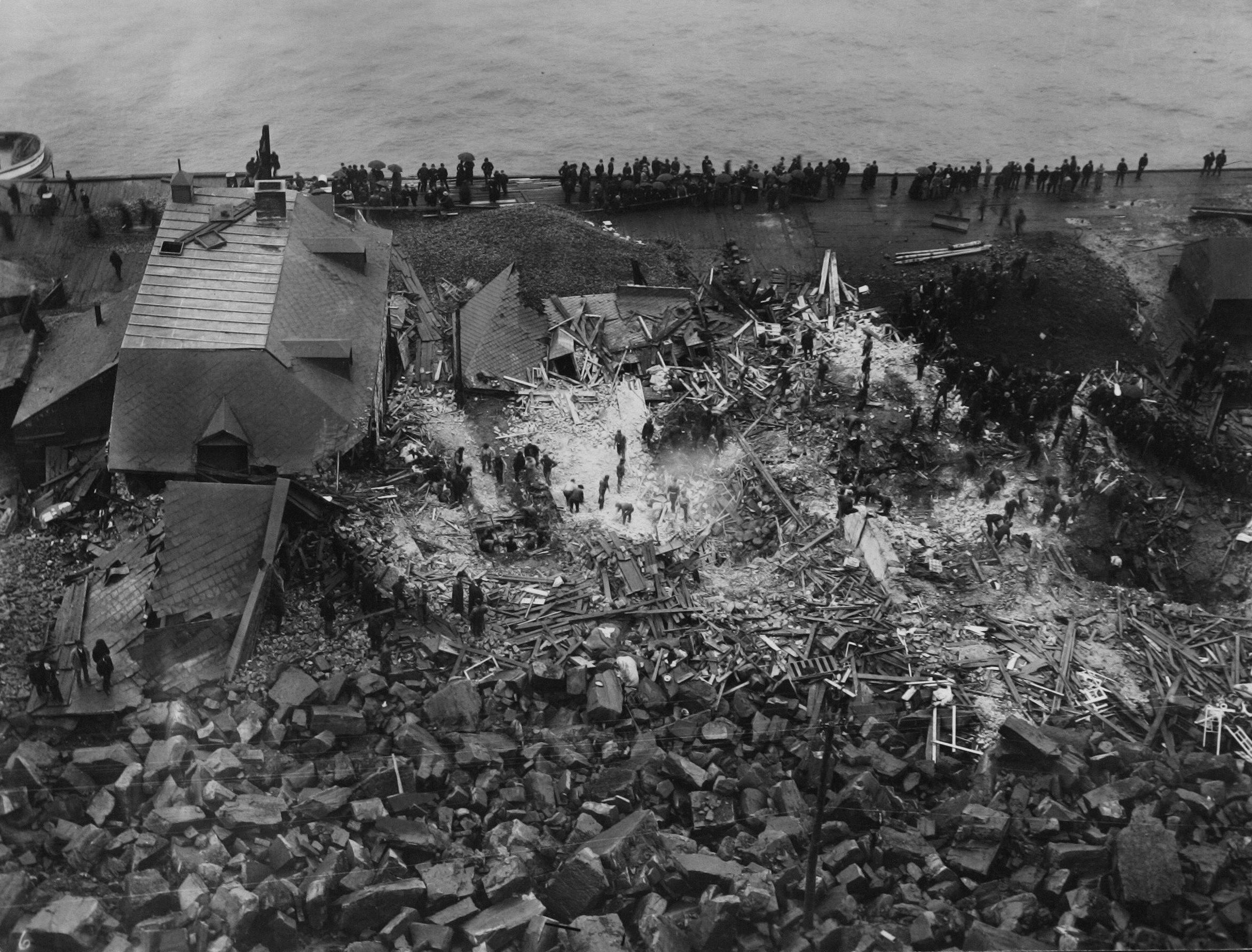
Rockslide in Quebec City, September 19, 1889

- August 1 – Alexander Davie, Premier of British Columbia, dies in office.
- August 2 – John Robson becomes premier of British Columbia.
- August 12 – The Canada (Ontario Boundary) Act, 1889 of the British Parliament expands Ontario's boundaries west to the Lake of the Woods and north to the Albany River.
- September 19 – A rockslide in Quebec City kills 45
- November – Neil McLeod becomes premier of Prince Edward Island, replacing Sir William Wilfred Sullivan.
- November 6 – Newfoundland election: William Whiteway's Liberals win a majority, defeating Robert Thorburn's Reforms

=== Full date unknown ===
- The Dominion Women Enfranchisement Association is created to campaign for women's right to vote

== Births ==
- February 27 – Samuel Bronfman, businessman (d.1971)
- May 16 – Morris Gray, politician (d.1966)
- August 13 – Camillien Houde, politician and four-time mayor of Montreal (d.1958)
- October 13 – Douglass Dumbrille, actor (d.1974)
- November 20 – John B. McNair, lawyer, politician, judge and 22nd Lieutenant Governor of New Brunswick (d.1968)
- December 4 – Leslie Gordon Bell, politician and lawyer (d.1963)

== Deaths ==
- April 9 – Andrew Charles Elliott, jurist, politician and 4th Premier of British Columbia (b. c1828)
- May 4 – A. B. Rogers, surveyor (b.1829)
- June 5 – John Hamilton Gray, Premier of New Brunswick (b.1814)
- July 5 – John Norquay, politician and 5th Premier of Manitoba (b.1841)
- August 1 – Alexander Edmund Batson Davie, politician and 7th Premier of British Columbia (b.1847)
- September 5 – Louis-Victor Sicotte, lawyer, judge and politician (b.1812)
- September 13 – Henry Joseph Clarke, lawyer, politician and 3rd Premier of Manitoba (b.1833)
- October 28 – Alexander Morris, politician, Minister and 2nd Lieutenant Governor of Manitoba (b.1826)

=== Full date unknown ===
- Edwin Randolph Oakes, politician (b.1818)
