= 1959 in Canada =

- Decades: 1930s; 1940s; 1950s; 1960s; 1970s
- See also: History of Canada; Timeline of Canadian history; List of years in Canada

Events from the year 1959 in Canada.

== Incumbents ==
=== Crown ===
- Monarch – Elizabeth II

=== Federal government ===
- Governor General – Vincent Massey (until September 15) then Georges Vanier
- Prime Minister – John Diefenbaker
- Chief Justice – Patrick Kerwin (Ontario)
- Parliament – 24th

=== Provincial governments ===
==== Lieutenant governors ====
- Lieutenant Governor of Alberta – John J. Bowlen (until December 16) then John Percy Page (from December 19)
- Lieutenant Governor of British Columbia – Frank Mackenzie Ross
- Lieutenant Governor of Manitoba – John Stewart McDiarmid
- Lieutenant Governor of New Brunswick – Joseph Leonard O'Brien
- Lieutenant Governor of Newfoundland – Campbell Leonard Macpherson
- Lieutenant Governor of Nova Scotia – Edward Chester Plow
- Lieutenant Governor of Ontario – John Keiller MacKay
- Lieutenant Governor of Prince Edward Island – Frederick Walter Hyndman
- Lieutenant Governor of Quebec – Onésime Gagnon
- Lieutenant Governor of Saskatchewan – Frank Lindsay Bastedo

==== Premiers ====
- Premier of Alberta – Ernest Manning
- Premier of British Columbia – W.A.C. Bennett
- Premier of Manitoba – Dufferin Roblin
- Premier of New Brunswick – Hugh John Flemming
- Premier of Newfoundland – Joey Smallwood
- Premier of Nova Scotia – Robert Stanfield
- Premier of Ontario – Leslie Frost
- Premier of Prince Edward Island – Alex Matheson (until September 16) then Walter Shaw
- Premier of Quebec – Maurice Duplessis (until September 7) then Paul Sauvé (from September 11)
- Premier of Saskatchewan – Tommy Douglas

=== Territorial governments ===
==== Commissioners ====
- Commissioner of Yukon – Frederick Howard Collins
- Commissioner of Northwest Territories – Robert Gordon Robertson

== Events ==
- February 20: Avro Arrow project is terminated
- April 1: The St. Lawrence Seaway opens
- June 11: 1959 Ontario general election: Leslie Frost's PCs win a fifth consecutive majority
- June 18: 1959 Alberta general election: Ernest Manning's Social Credit Party wins a seventh consecutive majority
- June 20: The Escuminac Disaster results in 35 fishermen drowned or missing and 22 fishing boats sunk.
- September 7: Maurice Duplessis, Premier of Quebec, dies in office
- September 11: Paul Sauvé becomes premier of Quebec
- September 15: Georges Vanier is sworn in as Governor General replacing Vincent Massey. He is the first French Canadian Governor General.
- September 16: Walter Shaw becomes premier of Prince Edward Island, replacing Alex Matheson
- October 12: Isabella Memorial (Montreal) unveiled
- November 18: Canadian content rules are introduced for television.
- December 2: York University is founded

=== Full date unknown ===
- National Energy Board of Canada is created.
- Steven Truscott falsely convicted of the murder of Lynne Harper. He would be exonerated in 2007.
- Vancouver Folk Song Society is founded.

== Arts and literature ==
=== New books ===
- Mordecai Richler: The Apprenticeship of Duddy Kravitz
- Hugh MacLennan: The Watch That Ends the Night
- Farley Mowat: Grey Seas Under
- Max Aitken: Friends
- Gordon R. Dickson: Dorsai!

=== Awards ===
- See 1959 Governor General's Awards for a complete list of winners and finalists for those awards.

== Sport ==
- April 18 - Montreal Canadiens won their Eleventh (and Fourth consecutive) Stanley Cup by defeating the Toronto Maple Leafs 4 games to 1. The deciding Game 5 was played at the Montreal Forum
- May 1 - Manitoba Junior Hockey League's Winnipeg Braves won their only Memorial Cup by defeating the Ontario Hockey Association's Peterborough TPT Petes 4 games to 1. The deciding Game 5 was played at Wheat City Arena in Brandon, Manitoba
- November 1 – Montreal Canadiens Jacques Plante becomes the first ice hockey goalie to wear a protective face mask during a game against the New York Rangers at the Montreal Forum
- November 28 - Winnipeg Blue Bombers won their Fifth Grey Cup by defeating the Hamilton Tiger-Cats 21 to 7 in the 47th Grey Cup played at Toronto's CNE Stadium

== Births ==
=== January to March ===
- January 1 – Sharon Bayes, field hockey player
- January 3 – Dwight Duncan, politician and Minister
- January 8 – Bill Sawchuk, swimmer
- January 11 – Rob Ramage, ice hockey player
- January 12 – Helen Vanderburg, synchronized swimmer
- May 25 – Rick Wamsley, ice hockey player

=== April to June ===
- April 5 – Stephen Feraday, javelin thrower
- April 6
  - Jim Rondeau, politician
  - Gail Shea, politician (d. 2025)

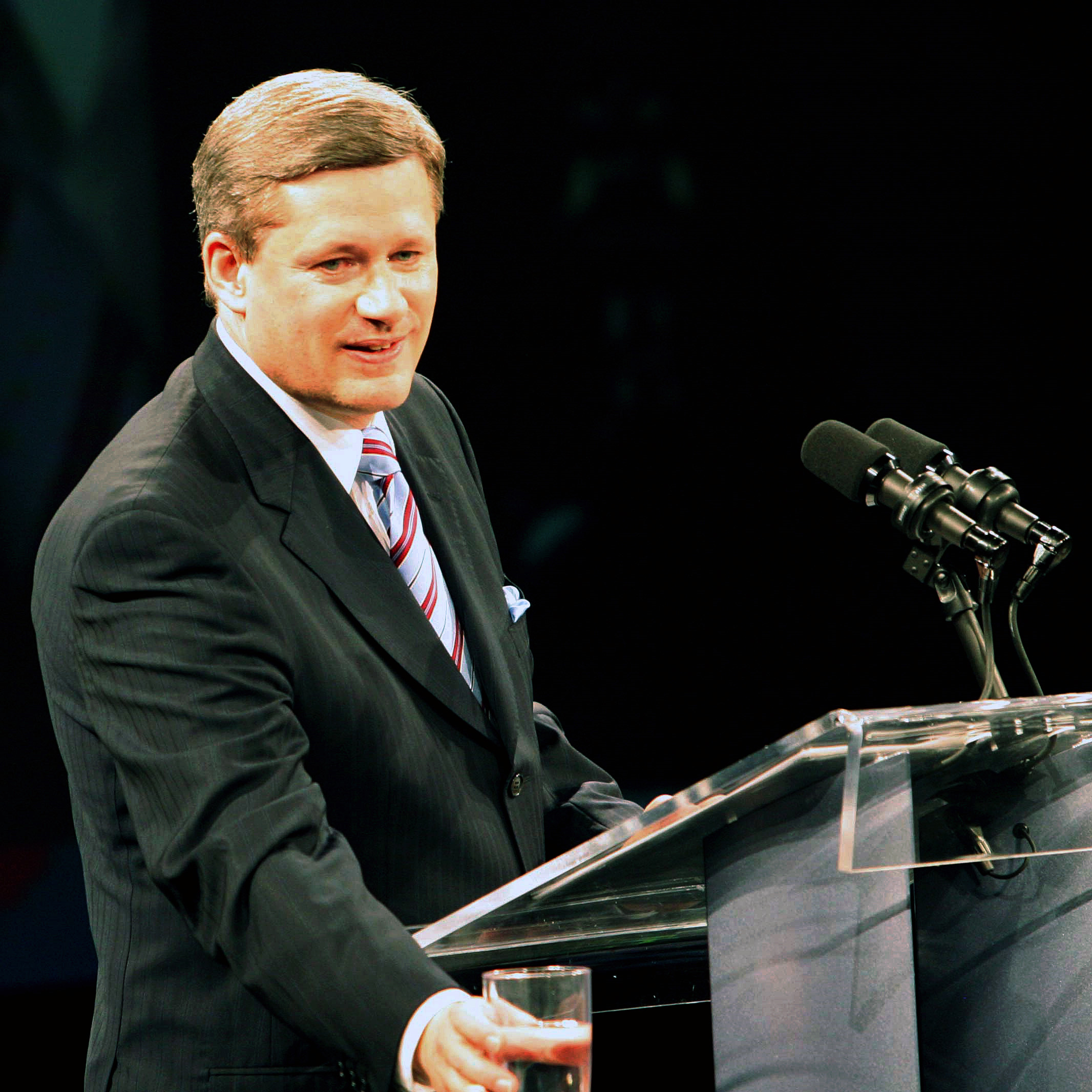
Stephen Harper

- April 13 – Genevieve Robic-Brunet, road racing cyclist
- April 15 – Kevin Lowe, ice hockey player
- April 22 – Ryan Stiles, actor, comedian and director
- April 30 – Paul Gross, actor, producer, director, singer and writer
- April 30 – Stephen Harper, politician and 22nd Prime Minister of Canada
- May 14 – Rick Vaive, ice hockey player
- May 26 – Brian Peaker, rower and Olympic silver medalist
- May 27
  - Eugene Melnyk, businessman and sports franchise owner (d. 2022)
  - Donna Strickland, physicist, recipient of Nobel Prize in Physics
- June 2 – Charlie Huddy, Canadian-American ice hockey player and coach
- June 4 – Rex Barnes, politician

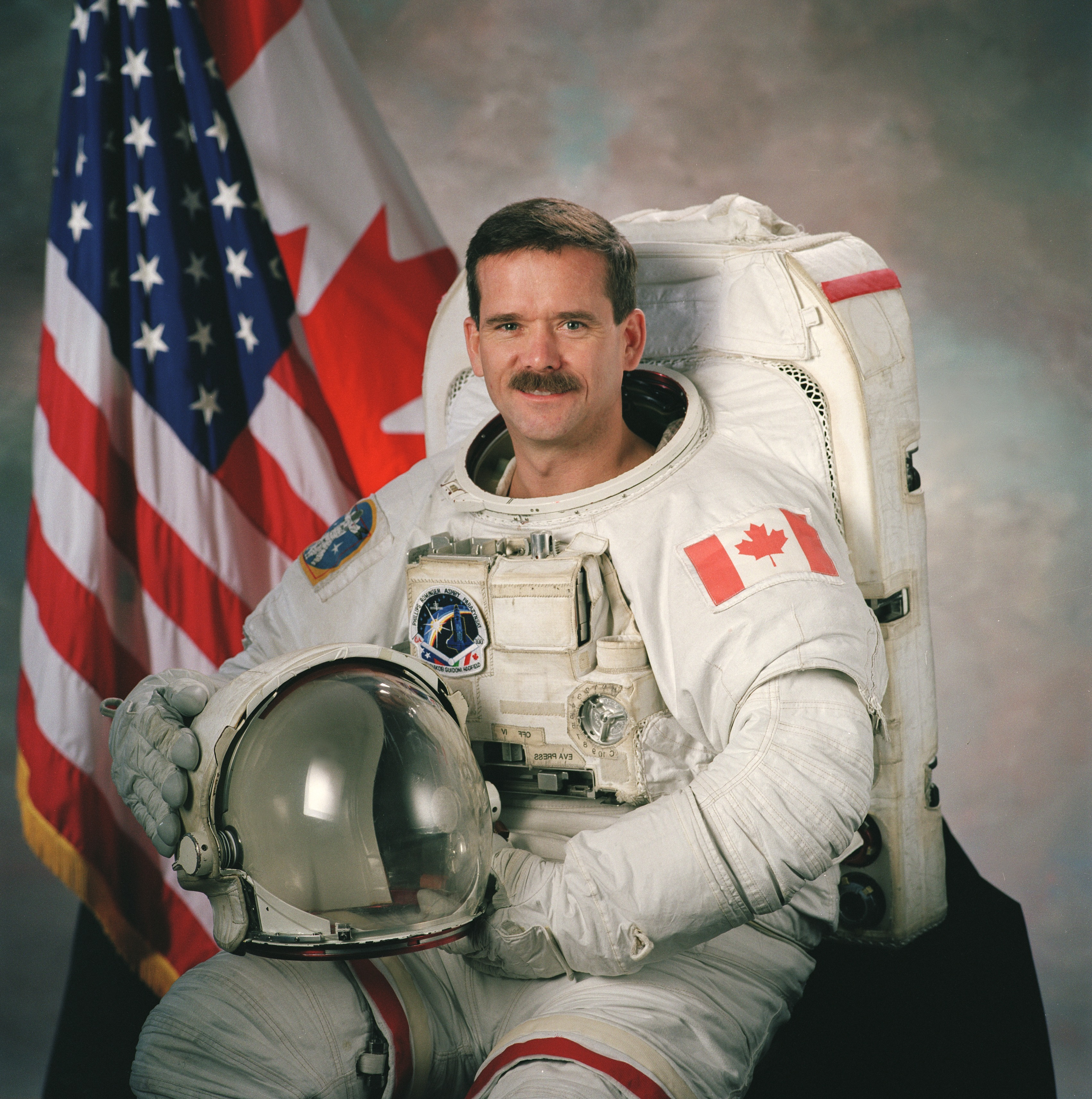
Chris Hadfield

- June 9 - Louis Hamelin, writer
- June 12 – Scott Thompson, comedian
- June 20 – Louise Bessette, pianist
- June 28 – Brad Fraser, playwright, screenwriter and cultural commentator

=== July to December ===
- August 29 – Chris Hadfield, astronaut, first Canadian to walk in space
- September 29 – Robert Thibault, politician
- October 14 – Dominic Agostino, politician (d.2004)
- October 20 – Janice McCaffrey, racewalker
- November 5 – Bryan Adams, rock singer-songwriter and photographer
- November 17 – Guy André, politician
- November 22 – Geoff Regan, politician
- December 2 – David Alward, 32nd Premier of New Brunswick
- December 8 – Mark Steyn, writer and broadcaster

=== Full date unknown ===
- Carole Laganière, documentary filmmaker
- Michael Slobodian, murderer responsible for the Centennial Secondary School shooting (d.1975)

== Deaths ==
- January 26 – Barbara Hanley, first woman to be elected a mayor in Canada (b.1882)
- February 11 – Harry James Barber, politician (b.1875)
- February 13 – Thomas Laird Kennedy, politician and 15th Premier of Ontario (b.1878)
- March 3 – Philémon Cousineau, politician (b.1874)
- March 17 – Sidney Earle Smith, academic and 7th President of the University of Toronto (b.1897)

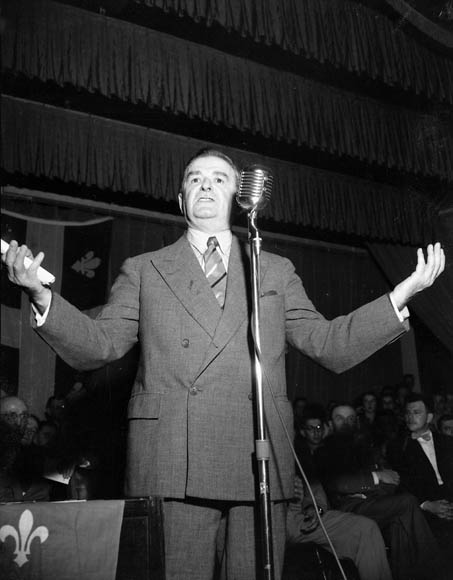
Maurice Duplessis campaigning in the 1952 election

- April 8 – George Croil, first Chief of the Air Staff of the Royal Canadian Air Force (b.1893)
- June 3 – Filip Konowal, soldier, Victoria Cross recipient in 1917 (b.1888)
- June 9 - Lynne Harper, murder victim (b.1946)
- September 7 – Maurice Duplessis, politician and 16th Premier of Quebec (b.1890)
- October 25 – Samuel Lawrence, politician and trade unionist (b.1879)

=== Full date unknown ===
- Edwin Hansford, politician (b.1895)

== See also ==
- 1959 in Canadian television
- List of Canadian films
