= 1890 in Canada =

- Decades: 1870s; 1880s; 1890s; 1900s; 1910s
- See also: History of Canada; Timeline of Canadian history; List of years in Canada

Events from the year 1890 in Canada.

== Incumbents ==
=== Crown ===
- Monarch – Victoria

=== Federal government ===
- Governor General – Frederick Stanley
- Prime Minister – John A. Macdonald
- Chief Justice – William Johnstone Ritchie (New Brunswick)
- Parliament – 6th

=== Provincial governments ===
==== Lieutenant governors ====
- Lieutenant Governor of British Columbia – Hugh Nelson
- Lieutenant Governor of Manitoba – John Christian Schultz
- Lieutenant Governor of New Brunswick – Samuel Leonard Tilley
- Lieutenant Governor of Nova Scotia – Archibald McLelan (until June 26) then Malachy Bowes Daly (from July 11)
- Lieutenant Governor of Ontario – Alexander Campbell
- Lieutenant Governor of Prince Edward Island – Jedediah Slason Carvell
- Lieutenant Governor of Quebec – Auguste-Réal Angers

==== Premiers ====
- Premier of British Columbia – John Robson
- Premier of Manitoba – Thomas Greenway
- Premier of New Brunswick – Andrew George Blair
- Premier of Nova Scotia – William Stevens Fielding
- Premier of Ontario – Oliver Mowat
- Premier of Prince Edward Island – Neil McLeod
- Premier of Quebec – Honoré Mercier

=== Territorial governments ===
==== Lieutenant governors ====
- Lieutenant Governor of Keewatin – John Christian Schultz
- Lieutenant Governor of the North-West Territories – Joseph Royal

==== Premiers ====
- Chairman of the Lieutenant-Governor's Advisory Council of the North-West Territories – Robert Brett

== Events ==
- March 31 — Manitoba Liberals under Thomas Greenway halt public funding of Catholic schools; causes uproar in Quebec.
- June 5 — Ontario election: Sir Oliver Mowat's Liberals win a sixth consecutive majority.
- July 20 — British Columbia election.
- August 10 — Prince Edward Island election.

== Births ==
=== January to June ===
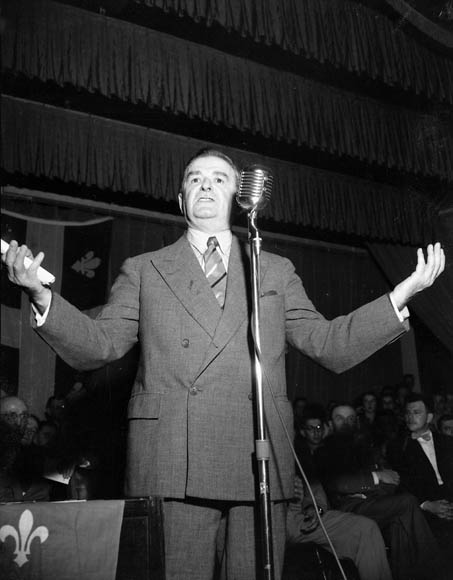
Maurice Duplessis campaigning in the 1952 election

- April 20 — Maurice Duplessis, politician and 16th Premier of Quebec (d.1959)
- March 3 — Norman Bethune, physician and medical innovator (d.1939)
- March 21 — Norman Hipel, politician and Minister (d.1953)
- March 24 — Agnes Macphail, politician, first woman to be elected to the House of Commons of Canada (d.1954)
- March 27 — John Horne Blackmore, politician (d.1971)
- May 4 — Franklin Carmichael, painter and Group of Seven member (d.1945)
- May 17 — Lionel FitzGerald, artist
- May 30 — John Stuart Foster, physicist (d.1944)

=== July to December ===
- July 9 – Joseph-Alphida Crête, politician (d. 1964)
- July 27 — Ian Alistair Mackenzie, politician and Minister (d.1949)
- August 10 — Angus Lewis Macdonald, lawyer, law professor, politician and 19th Premier of Nova Scotia (d.1954)
- September 20 — Kathleen Parlow, violinist (d.1963)
- October 9 — Aimee Semple McPherson, evangelist (d.1944)
- October 28 — Louis Orville Breithaupt, 18th Lieutenant Governor of Ontario (d.1960)
- December 10 — Byron Ingemar Johnson, politician and 24th Premier of British Columbia (d.1964)
- December 12 – Charles Basil Price, soldier and politician (d. 1975)

== Deaths ==
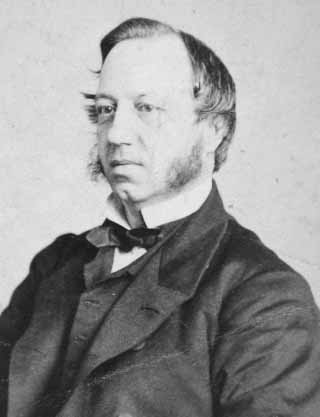
Pierre-Joseph-Olivier Chauveau in 1863

- January 1 — Joseph Godéric Blanchet, politician (b.1829)
- January 17 — François-Xavier-Anselme Trudel, politician (b.1838)
- January 25 – William Kennedy, explorer involved in the search for Sir John Franklin (b.1814)
- February 13 — Éphrem-A. Brisebois, police officer (b. 1850)
- April 4 — Pierre-Joseph-Olivier Chauveau, Premier of Quebec (b.1820)
- April 25 — Crowfoot, a chief of the Siksika First Nation (b. c1830)
- September 26 — Henri Faraud, bishop of the Roman Catholic Church (b.1823)
- December — Silas Tertius Rand Bill, politician, merchant and shipowner (b.1842)
