= 1824 in Canada =

- Decades: 1800s; 1810s; 1820s; 1830s; 1840s
- See also: History of Canada; Timeline of Canadian history; List of years in Canada

Events from the year 1824 in Canada.

== Incumbents ==
- Monarch: George IV

=== Federal government ===
- Parliament of Lower Canada: 11th (until July 6)
- Parliament of Upper Canada: 8th (until January 19)

=== Governors ===
- Governor of the Canadas: Robert Milnes
- Governor of New Brunswick: George Stracey Smyth
- Governor of Nova Scotia: John Coape Sherbrooke
- Commodore-Governor of Newfoundland: Richard Goodwin Keats
- Governor of Prince Edward Island: Charles Douglass Smith

== Events ==
- The first Welland Canal is begun, partly in response to American initiatives in the Erie Canal.
- Russians begin exploration of mainland that leads to discovery of Nushagak, Kuskokwim, Yukon, and Koyukuk Rivers.
- William Lyon Mackenzie establishes the Colonial Advocate.
- First Lachine Canal near Montreal is completed.

== Births ==
- January 4 – Peter Mitchell, politician, Minister and a Father of Confederation (died 1899)
- March 14 – John Robson, journalist, politician and Premier of British Columbia (died 1892)
- August 4 – Antoine Gérin-Lajoie, poet and novelist (died 1882)
- November 18 – John Bolton, businessman and politician (died 1872)

=== Full date unknown ===
- Philip Francis Little, 1st Premier of Newfoundland of the colonial (died 1897)
- Edward Whelan, journalist and politician (died 1867)

== Deaths ==
- January 17 – William Osgoode, judge (born 1754)
- February 9 – Ward Chipman, lawyer, public servant, politician (born 1754)
- April 4 – Alexander Henry the elder, fur trader, merchant, militia officer, jp, and author (born 1739)
- August 3 – Joseph Barss, privateer (born 1776)
