= 1888 in Canada =

- Decades: 1860s; 1870s; 1880s; 1890s; 1900s
- See also: History of Canada; Timeline of Canadian history; List of years in Canada

Events from the year 1888 in Canada.

== Incumbents ==
=== Crown ===
- Monarch – Victoria

=== Federal government ===
- Governor General – Henry Petty-Fitzmaurice (until June 11) then Frederick Stanley
- Prime Minister – John A. Macdonald
- Chief Justice – William Johnstone Ritchie (New Brunswick)
- Parliament – 6th

=== Provincial governments ===
==== Lieutenant governors ====
- Lieutenant Governor of British Columbia – Hugh Nelson
- Lieutenant Governor of Manitoba – James Cox Aikins (until July 1) then John Christian Schultz
- Lieutenant Governor of New Brunswick – Samuel Leonard Tilley
- Lieutenant Governor of Nova Scotia – Matthew Henry Richey (until July 8) then Archibald McLelan
- Lieutenant Governor of Ontario – Alexander Campbell
- Lieutenant Governor of Prince Edward Island – Andrew Archibald Macdonald
- Lieutenant Governor of Quebec – Auguste-Réal Angers

==== Premiers ====
- Premier of British Columbia – Alexander Edmund Batson Davie
- Premier of Manitoba – David Howard Harrison (until January 19) then Thomas Greenway
- Premier of New Brunswick – Andrew George Blair
- Premier of Nova Scotia – William Stevens Fielding
- Premier of Ontario – Oliver Mowat
- Premier of Prince Edward Island – William Wilfred Sullivan
- Premier of Quebec – Honoré Mercier

=== Territorial governments ===
==== Lieutenant governors ====
- Lieutenant Governor of Keewatin – James Cox Aikins (until July 1) then John Christian Schultz
- Lieutenant Governor of the North-West Territories – Edgar Dewdney (until July 1) then Joseph Royal

==== Premiers ====
- Chairman of the Lieutenant-Governor's Advisory Council of the North-West Territories – Robert Brett (from June 30)

== Events ==
- January 19 – Thomas Greenway becomes premier of Manitoba, replacing David H. Harrison.
- June 20 – The North-West Territories holds its first general election; 22 members of the Legislative Assembly are elected. All are independents; there are no party politics in the territories.
- July 11 – The Manitoba general election is held.

=== Full date unknown ===
- Boundary survey started by Dr. William H. Dall of the United States and Dr. George M. Dawson of Canada.

== Arts and literature ==
=== New books ===
- Among the Millet: Archibald Lampman

== Births ==
=== January to June ===
- January 18 – Charles Gavan Power, politician, Minister and Senator (d.1968)
- January 20 – Ethel Wilson, novelist and short story writer (d.1980)
- February 28 – George Pearkes, politician, soldier and recipient of the Victoria Cross (d.1984)
- March 24 – Samuel Rosborough Balcom, politician (d.1981)
- April 6 – Leonard Brockington, lawyer, civil servant and first head of the Canadian Broadcasting Corporation (CBC) (d.1966)
- April 8 – Dora Mavor Moore, actor, teacher and director (d.1979)
- April 23
  - Joseph Georges Bouchard, politician (d.1956)
  - Georges Vanier, soldier, diplomat and Governor General of Canada (d.1967)
- April 28 – Harry Crerar, General (d.1965)
- May 3 – Johan Helders, photographer

=== July to December ===
- July 11 – John Keiller MacKay, soldier, jurist and 19th Lieutenant Governor of Ontario (d.1970)
- August 3 – Margaret Murray, journalist
- September 2 – Dorothy Stevens, artist
- September 7 – William Bryce, politician
- September 15 – Filip Konowal, soldier, Victoria Cross recipient in 1917 (d.1959)
- September 18
  - Grey Owl, writer and conservationist (d.1938)
  - William Duncan Herridge, politician and diplomat (d.1961)
- October 23 – Onésime Gagnon, politician and the 20th Lieutenant Governor of Quebec (d.1961)
- November 3 – Joseph Oscar Lefebre Boulanger, politician and lawyer (d.1958)
- November 11 – S. E. Rogers, politician (d.1965)
- November 25 – Joseph W. Noseworthy, politician (d.1956)
- December 2 – Major James Coldwell, politician (d.1974)

== Deaths ==
- January 17 – Big Bear, Cree leader (b. c1825)
- February 4 – Sévère Rivard, lawyer, politician and 17th Mayor of Montreal (b.1834)
- March 2 – William Elliott, farmer, merchant and politician (b.1834)
- April 21 – Thomas White, journalist and politician (b.1830)
- May 3 – William Alexander Henry, politician (b.1816)
- May 12 – Élie Saint-Hilaire, educator, farmer and politician (b.1839)
- May 30 – James Ferrier, merchant, politician and 4th Mayor of Montreal (b.1800)
- August 4 – Charles-Joseph Coursol, lawyer, politician and 13th Mayor of Montreal (b.1819)
- August 24 – John Rose, politician (b.1820)
- October 1 – James Gibb Ross, merchant and politician (b.1819)

== Historical documents ==
House of Commons committee hears of cartels conspiring to control products ranging from groceries to coal to stoves and coffins

Sandford Fleming's ideas on telegraph line to Australia

Indenture form between "Guardian" and caretaker/employer who agrees to pay immigrant boy and give him "good clothing and schooling" etc. for work

U.S. Supreme Court rules on Alexander Graham Bell's telephone patent in light of previous invention claimed by "a poor mechanic"

Brief visit to Chinatown temple in Victoria, B.C.

In report on northern lands, Senate committee points out unwanted wildlife loss from "greater ease in their capture" and use of poison

Lecturer describes dogs of Hudson Strait Inuit
