= 1949 in Canada =

- Decades: 1920s; 1930s; 1940s; 1950s; 1960s
- See also: History of Canada; Timeline of Canadian history; List of years in Canada

Events from the year 1949 in Canada.

== Incumbents ==
=== Crown ===
- Monarch – George VI

=== Federal government ===
- Governor General – the Viscount Alexander of Tunis
- Prime Minister – Louis St. Laurent
- Chief Justice – Thibaudeau Rinfret (Quebec)
- Parliament – 20th (until 30 April) then 21st (from 15 September)

=== Provincial governments ===
==== Lieutenant governors ====
- Lieutenant Governor of Alberta – John C. Bowen
- Lieutenant Governor of British Columbia – Charles Arthur Banks
- Lieutenant Governor of Manitoba – Roland Fairbairn McWilliams
- Lieutenant Governor of New Brunswick – David Laurence MacLaren
- Lieutenant Governor of Newfoundland – Albert Walsh (until September 15) then Leonard Outerbridge
- Lieutenant Governor of Nova Scotia – John Alexander Douglas McCurdy
- Lieutenant Governor of Ontario – Ray Lawson
- Lieutenant Governor of Prince Edward Island – Joseph Alphonsus Bernard
- Lieutenant Governor of Quebec – Eugène Fiset
- Lieutenant Governor of Saskatchewan – John Michael Uhrich

==== Premiers ====
- Premier of Alberta – Ernest Manning
- Premier of British Columbia – Boss Johnson
- Premier of Manitoba – Douglas Campbell
- Premier of New Brunswick – John McNair
- Premier of Newfoundland – Joey Smallwood
- Premier of Nova Scotia – Angus Macdonald
- Premier of Ontario – Thomas Laird Kennedy (until May 4) then Leslie Frost
- Premier of Prince Edward Island – J. Walter Jones
- Premier of Quebec – Maurice Duplessis
- Premier of Saskatchewan – Tommy Douglas

=== Territorial governments ===
==== Commissioners ====
- Commissioner of Yukon – John Edward Gibben
- Commissioner of Northwest Territories – Hugh Llewellyn Keenleyside

== Events ==
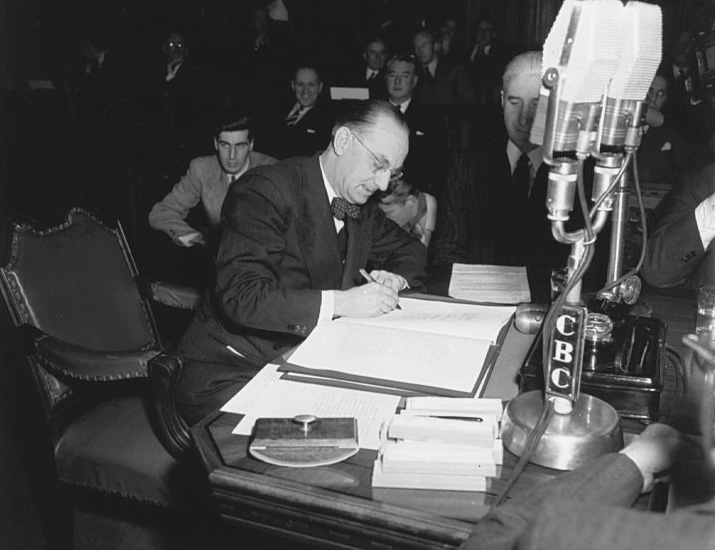
Joseph Smallwood signs the document bringing Newfoundland into Confederation

- March 31 - Newfoundland becomes Canada's 10th province at a fraction of a second from April 1
- April 1 - Joey Smallwood becomes the first premier of Newfoundland as a Canadian province
- April 4 - Canada joins the North Atlantic Treaty Organization (NATO)
- May 4 - Leslie Frost becomes premier of Ontario, replacing Thomas Kennedy
- June 27 - Federal election: Louis Saint Laurent's Liberals win a fourth consecutive majority
- August 22 - Queen Charlotte earthquake: Canada's largest earthquake since the 1700 Cascadia earthquake
- September 9 - Albert Guay affair: in-flight bombing of a Canadian Pacific Airlines DC-3 en route from Quebec City to Baie-Comeau
- September 14 - The Noronic, the largest Canadian passenger ship on the Great Lakes, is destroyed by a fire while docked in Toronto, killing 118

=== Full date unknown ===
- Canadian appeals to the Judicial Committee of the Privy Council are abolished, making the Supreme Court of Canada the country's top court
- British Columbia gives Asian-Canadians the vote
- Gustave Sherman establishes his custume jewellery business, Sherman & Company Ltd. in Montreal

== Arts and literature ==
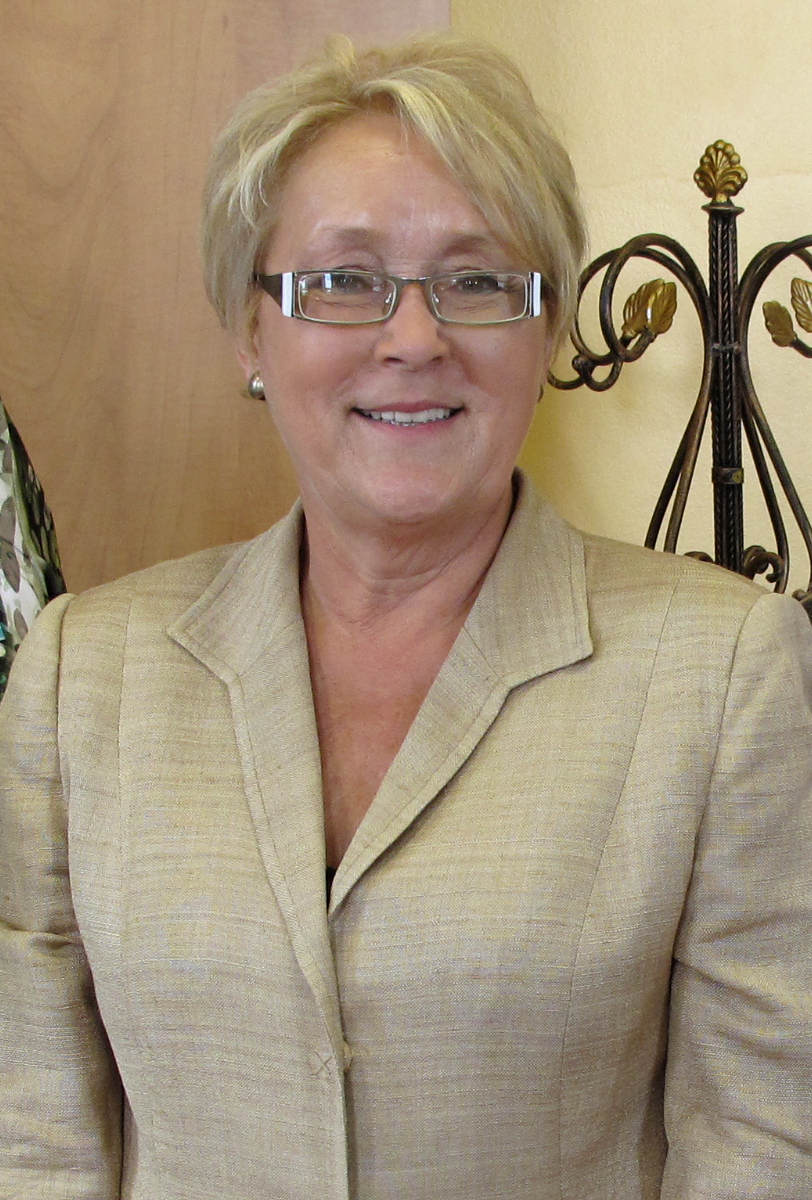
Pauline Marois

=== Awards ===
- See 1949 Governor General's Awards for a complete list of winners and finalists for those awards.
- Stephen Leacock Award: Angeline Hango, Truthfully Yours

== Sport ==
- April 16 – The Toronto Maple Leafs win their eighth (third consecutive) Stanley Cup by defeating the Detroit Red Wings 4 games to 0. The deciding Game 4 was played at Maple Leaf Gardens in Toronto
- May 16 – The Quebec Junior Hockey League's Montreal Royals win their only Memorial Cup by defeating the Manitoba Junior Hockey League's Brandon Wheat Kings 4 games to 3 (with 1 tie). The deciding game was played Shea's Amphitheatre in Winnipeg
- November 26 – The Montreal Alouettes win their first Grey Cup by defeating the Calgary Stampeders 28–15 in the 37th Grey Cup played at Varsity Stadium in Toronto
- Date unknown – The Edmonton Eskimos join the Western Interprovincial Football Union

== Births ==
=== January to March ===
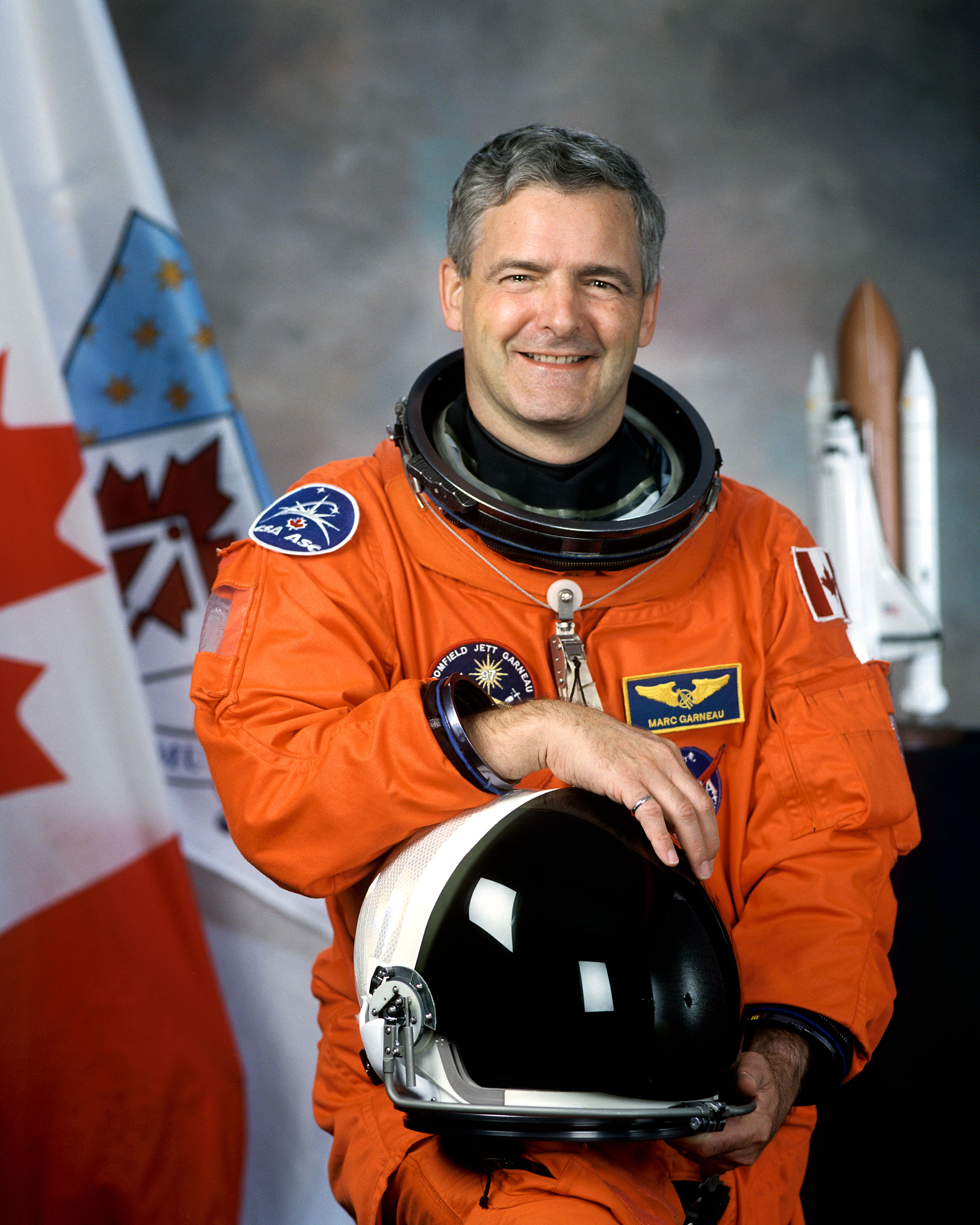
Marc Garneau

- January 24 - Guy Charron, ice hockey player
- February 14 - Denis Rocan, politician
- February 23 - Marc Garneau, astronaut, engineer and politician (d. 2025)
- March 1 - Jane Haist, discus thrower and shot putter (d. 2022)
- March 3 - Elijah Harper, politician (d. 2013)
- March 16 - Victor Garber, actor and singer
- March 25 - Jean Potvin, ice hockey player (d. 2022)
- March 29 - Pauline Marois, social worker, civil servant and 30th premier of Quebec
- March 30 - Liza Frulla, politician

=== April to June ===
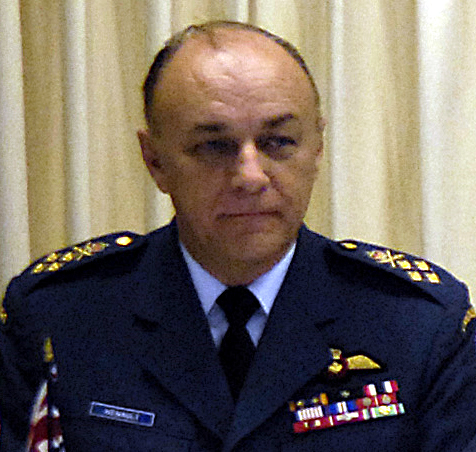
Ray Henault

- April 4 - Nava Starr, chess player and a Women's International Master
- April 6 - Réginald Bélair, politician
- April 8 - Claudette Bradshaw, politician
- April 14 - Percy Mockler, politician and Senator
- April 16 - Sandy Hawley, jockey
- April 18 - Jean-Paul Saint-Pierre, politician, Mayor of Russell, Ontario (since 2010) (d. 2014)
- April 26 - Ray Henault, general and Chief of Defence Staff
- May 6 - Diane Ablonczy, politician
- May 20 - Sheldon Oberman, children's writer (d. 2004)
- May 20 - Dave Thomas, comedian and actor
- June 7 - Christopher W. Morris, philosopher and academic
- June 21 - Jane Urquhart, writer
- June 22 - Wayne Easter, politician

=== July to September ===
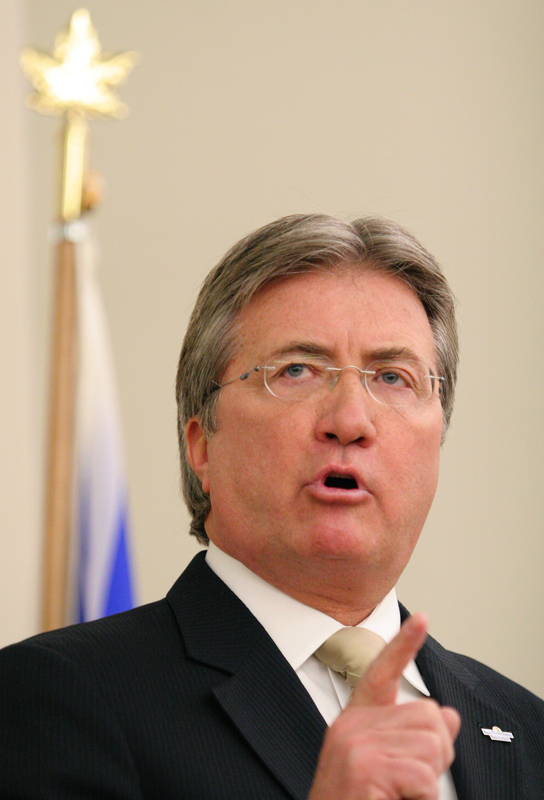
Danny Williams

- July 3 - Jan Smithers, actress
- July 11 - Liona Boyd, classical guitarist
- July 12 - Ted Barris, writer, journalist, professor, and broadcaster
- August 4 - Danny Williams, politician and 9th Premier of Newfoundland and Labrador
- August 13 - Bobby Clarke, ice hockey player
- August 21 - Larry Fisher, murderer (d. 2015)
- August 30 - Don Boudria, politician and Minister
- September 6 - Carole-Marie Allard, politician
- September 12 - Kevin Major, author
- September 26 - Marie Tifo, actress

=== October to December ===
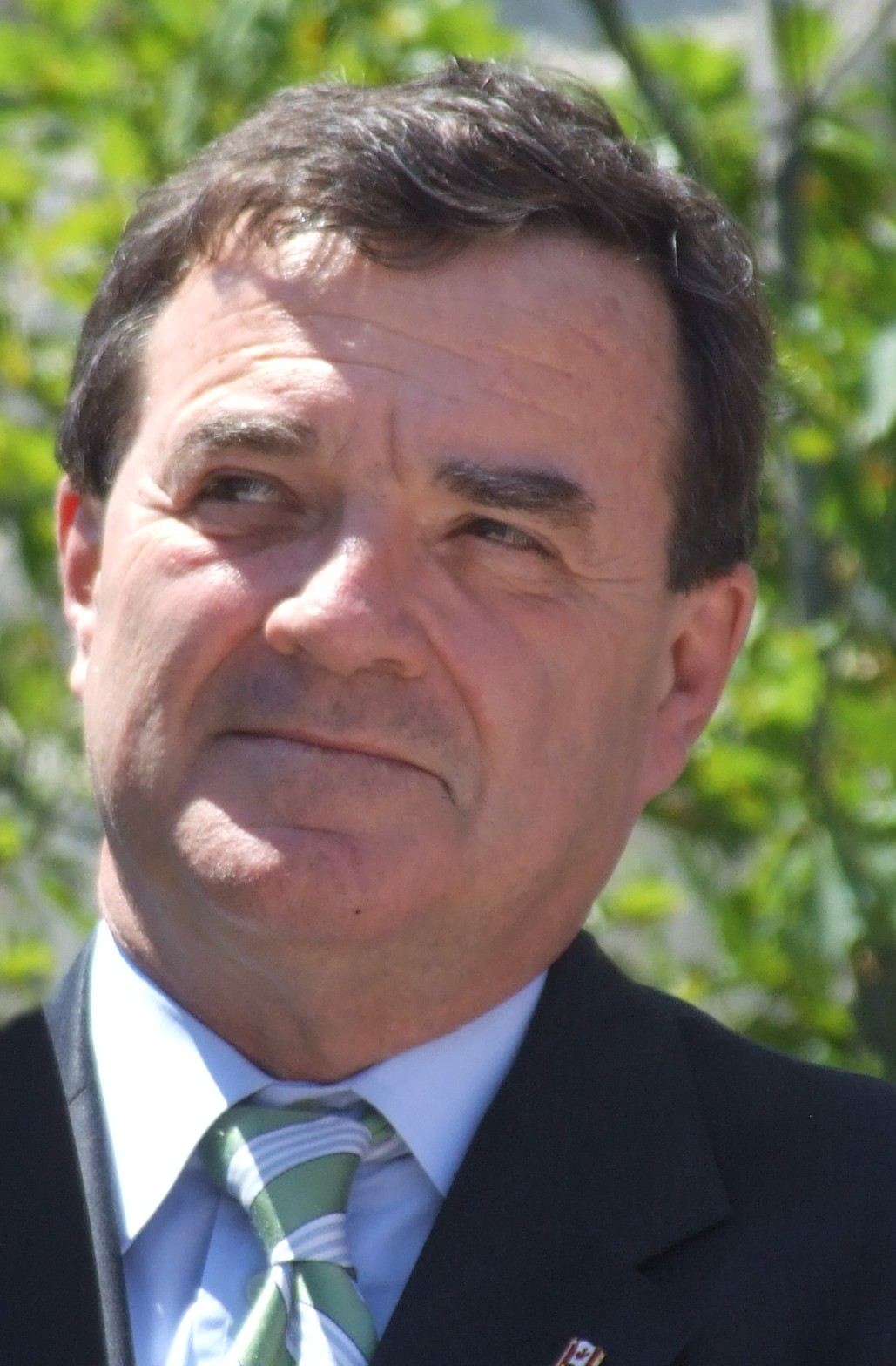
Jim Flaherty

- October 10 - Michel Létourneau, politician (d. 2019)
- October 24 - Robert Pickton, serial killer and pig farmer (d. 2024)
- October 25 - Laurie Skreslet, mountaineer, first Canadian to reach the summit of Mount Everest
- October 27 - Garth Drabinsky, film and theatrical producer and entrepreneur
- November 27 - Nick Discepola, politician
- November 28 - Paul Shaffer, musician, actor, voice actor, author, comedian and composer
- November 29 - Stan Rogers, folk musician and songwriter (d. 1983)
- December 13 - Denise Leblanc-Bantey, politician (d. 1999)
- December 19 - Larry Bagnell, politician
- December 21 - John Loewen, businessman and politician
- December 30 - Jim Flaherty, politician and Minister (d. 2014)

=== Full date unknown ===
- Zahra Kazemi, photographer, died in Iranian custody (d. 2003)

== Deaths ==
=== January to June ===
- January 9 - Tom Longboat, long-distance runner (b. 1887)
- January 11 - John Wesley Brien, physician and politician (b. 1864)
- February 12 - Pegi Nicol MacLeod, artist (b. 1904)
- May 22 - Sir Douglas Alexander, 1st Baronet, British-born Canadian industrialist (b. 1864)
- June 2 - François Blais, politician (b. 1875)

=== July to December ===
- July 7 - Fred Wellington Bowen, politician (b. 1877)
- August 23 - Herbert Greenfield, politician and 4th Premier of Alberta (b. 1869)
- September 2 - Ian Alistair Mackenzie, politician and Minister (b. 1890)
- December 7 - Stanislas Blanchard, politician (b. 1871)
- December 16 - Albert Edward Matthews, 16th Lieutenant Governor of Ontario (b. 1873)
- December 16 - Sidney Olcott, film producer, director, actor and screenwriter (b. 1873)

== See also ==
- List of Canadian films
