= 1823 in Canada =

- Decades: 1800s; 1810s; 1820s; 1830s; 1840s
- See also: History of Canada; Timeline of Canadian history; List of years in Canada

Events from the year 1823 in Canada.

== Incumbents ==
- Monarch: George IV

=== Federal government ===
- Parliament of Lower Canada: 11th
- Parliament of Upper Canada: 8th

=== Governors ===
- Governor of the Canadas: Robert Milnes
- Governor of New Brunswick: George Stracey Smyth
- Governor of Nova Scotia: John Coape Sherbrooke
- Commodore-Governor of Newfoundland: Richard Goodwin Keats
- Governor of Prince Edward Island: Charles Douglass Smith

== Events ==
- May 10 – Louis-Joseph Papineau and John Neilson are in London to present a petition of 60,000 signatures against favouring Union of the colonies
- October 14 – At a meeting, in Montreal, Mr. (afterwards Sir) James Stuart favors Union.

=== Full date unknown ===
- Shanawdithit, the last known Beothuk is found
- British expedition up the St. Clair River; site of Corunna surveyed as a potential capital for Upper Canada
- Smiths Falls, Ontario is founded
- Ward Chipman replaces George Stracey Smyth as Governor of New Brunswick
- Peter Robinson organizes land settlements of Irish Catholics to Carelton and Lanark County, Ontario

== Arts and literature ==
=== New books ===
- A General Description of Nova Scotia, Thomas Chandler Haliburton his first work
- James Fenimore Cooper's first volume of his Leatherstocking series published in the United States.

== Births ==
- February 24 – William Murdoch, poet (died 1887)
- March 30 – James Cox Aikins, politician, Minister and Lieutenant-Governor of Manitoba (died 1904)
- April 29 – Hart Massey, businessman and philanthropist (died 1896)
- June 2 – Gédéon Ouimet, politician and 2nd Premier of Quebec (died 1905)

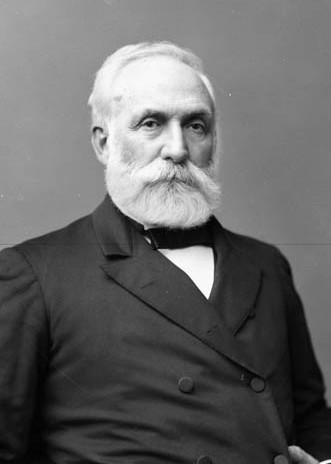
Mackenzie Bowell

- June 13 – David Breakenridge Read, lawyer and 14th Mayor of Toronto (died 1904)
- June 17 – Henri Faraud, Roman Catholic bishop (died 1890)
- July 23 – Alexandre-Antonin Taché, Roman Catholic priest, missionary, author and Archbishop (died 1894)
- August 13 – Goldwin Smith, historian and journalist (died 1910)
- October 16 – Marc-Aurèle Plamondon, lawyer, journalist, publisher, and judge (died 1900)
- November 10 – Thomas Arkell, politician, farmer and grain merchant (died 1906)
- December 27 – Mackenzie Bowell, politician and 5th Prime Minister of Canada, Born in Rickinghall, England. (died 1917)
