= 1828 in Canada =

- Decades: 1800s; 1810s; 1820s; 1830s; 1840s
- See also: History of Canada; Timeline of Canadian history; List of years in Canada

Events from the year 1828 in Canada.

== Incumbents ==
- Monarch: George IV

=== Federal government ===
- Parliament of Lower Canada: 13th
- Parliament of Upper Canada: 9th (until March 25)

=== Governors ===
- Governor of the Canadas: Robert Milnes
- Governor of New Brunswick: Howard Douglas
- Governor of Nova Scotia: John Coape Sherbrooke
- Civil Governor of Newfoundland: Thomas John Cochrane
- Governor of Prince Edward Island: Charles Douglass Smith

== Events ==
- William Lyon Mackenzie elected to the Assembly with the first Reform majority.
- Settlement begins in Stratford, Ontario
- A memorandum is sent by the Parti Patriote to the British Parliament listing grievances over lack of power for the elected assembly and other issues.

== Births ==
- January 23 – John Carling, businessman and politician (died 1911)
- April 1 – William Whiteway, politician and three time Premier of Newfoundland (died 1908)
- May 25 – James McIntyre, poet (died 1906)
- October 5 – Alexander Gunn, politician (died 1907)

== Deaths ==
- Tête Jaune, trapper
