= 1899 in Canada =

- Decades: 1870s; 1880s; 1890s; 1900s; 1910s
- See also: History of Canada; Timeline of Canadian history; List of years in Canada

Events from the year 1899 in Canada.

== Incumbents ==
=== Crown ===
- Monarch – Victoria

=== Federal government ===
- Governor General – The 4th Earl of Minto
- Prime Minister – Wilfrid Laurier
- Chief Justice – Samuel Henry Strong (Ontario)
- Parliament – 8th

=== Provincial governments ===
==== Lieutenant governors ====
- Lieutenant Governor of British Columbia – Thomas Robert McInnes
- Lieutenant Governor of Manitoba – James Colebrooke Patterson
- Lieutenant Governor of New Brunswick – Jabez Bunting Snowball
- Lieutenant Governor of Nova Scotia – Malachy Bowes Daly
- Lieutenant Governor of Ontario – Oliver Mowat
- Lieutenant Governor of Prince Edward Island – George W. Howlan (until May 23) then Peter Adolphus McIntyre
- Lieutenant Governor of Quebec – Louis-Amable Jetté

==== Premiers ====
- Premier of British Columbia – Charles Augustus Semlin
- Premier of Manitoba – Thomas Greenway
- Premier of New Brunswick – Henry Emmerson
- Premier of Nova Scotia – George Henry Murray
- Premier of Ontario – Arthur Sturgis Hardy (until October 21) then George William Ross
- Premier of Prince Edward Island – Donald Farquharson
- Premier of Quebec – Félix-Gabriel Marchand

=== Territorial governments ===
==== Commissioners ====
- Commissioner of Yukon – William Ogilvie

==== Lieutenant governors ====
- Lieutenant Governor of Keewatin – James Colebrooke Patterson
- Lieutenant Governor of the North-West Territories – Amédée E. Forget

==== Premiers ====
- Premier of North-West Territories – Frederick Haultain

== Events ==
- January 20 – About 2000 Doukhobors arrive in Halifax, Nova Scotia, 7400 by year end.
- May 5 – The village of Stirling, Alberta, NWT, is founded as a Mormon colony of 30 American settlers from Richfield, Utah, led by Theodore Brandley.
- May 25 – A fire in Saint John, New Brunswick, destroys 150 buildings and renders over 1,000 people homeless.
- June 21 – Treaty No. 8 cedes 840,000 km^{2} to the Crown, located in British Columbia and the North-West Territories' districts of Alberta, Athabasca and Mackenzie.
- July 5 – In Brandon, Manitoba, housemaid Hilda Blake shoots her mistress twice; the first shot misses, but the second bullet pierces the mistress's right lung. Blake was later hanged for murder.
- September 18 – The new City Hall building opens in Toronto.
- September 19 – A rock slide in Quebec City kills 45.
- October 4 – First Canadian troops sent to an overseas war (Boer War).
- October 18 – Henri Bourassa resigns from cabinet to protest Canada's intervention in the Boer War.
- October 21 – George William Ross becomes premier of Ontario, replacing Arthur S. Hardy.
- October 30 – Second Boer War: The first Canadian troops arrive in the Cape Colony.

== Births ==
=== January to June ===
- January 5 – Hugh John Flemming, politician and 24th Premier of New Brunswick (d.1982)
- January 6 – Sonia Eckhardt-Gramatté, composer
- February 27 – Charles Best, medical scientist, co-discoverer of insulin (d.1978)
- March 14 – K. C. Irving, entrepreneur and industrialist (d.1992)
- May 26 – Antonio Barrette, politician and 18th Premier of Quebec (d.1968)
- May 27 – Dov Yosef, Canadian-born Israeli politician and statesman (d.1980)

=== July to December ===
- July 24 – Dan George, actor and author (d.1981)
- August 1 – F. R. Scott, poet, intellectual and constitutional expert (d.1985)
- October 2 – Juda Hirsch Quastel, biochemist (d.1987)
- October 3 – Adrien Arcand, journalist and fascist (d.1967)
- November 5 – Gilbert Layton, businessman and politician (d.1961)
- November 10 – Billy Boucher, ice hockey player (d.1958)
- November 17 – Douglas Shearer, sound designer and recording director (d.1971)
- November 30 – Edna Diefenbaker, first wife of Prime Minister John Diefenbaker (d.1951)
- December 24 – William Van Steenburgh, scientist

== Deaths ==
- February 10 – Archibald Lampman, poet (b.1861)
- April 29 – George Frederick Baird, politician and lawyer (b.1851)
- July 31 – James David Edgar, politician (b.1841)
- August 29 – Catharine Parr Traill, writer (b.1802)
- October 25
  - Grant Allen, science writer, author and novelist (b.1848)
  - Peter Mitchell, politician, Minister and a Father of Confederation (b.1824)
- November 19 – John William Dawson, geologist and university administrator (b.1820)
- December 13
  - George Airey Kirkpatrick, politician (b.1841)
  - Lucius Richard O'Brien, painter (b.1832)
