= 1825 in Canada =

- Decades: 1800s; 1810s; 1820s; 1830s; 1840s
- See also: History of Canada; Timeline of Canadian history; List of years in Canada

Events from the year 1825 in Canada.

== Incumbents ==
- Monarch: George IV

=== Federal government ===
- Parliament of Lower Canada: 12th (starting January 8)
- Parliament of Upper Canada: 9th (starting January 11)

=== Governors ===
- Governor of the Canadas: George Ramsay
- Governor of New Brunswick: Howard Douglas
- Governor of Nova Scotia: James Kempt
- Commodore-Governor of Newfoundland: Thomas John Cochrane
- Governor of Prince Edward Island: Charles Douglass Smith

== Events ==
- January 2 – The Parliament House, in Toronto, is burned.
- June 27 – The Canada Company is founded
- September 7 – Soldiers of the 70th Regiment subdue a fire, which consumes over eighty buildings, in Montreal.
- September to October: The Great Miramichi Fire destroys at least 10 000 km^{2} to 20,000 km^{2} and killing at least 280 people.
- October 26 – US finishes Erie Canal from Buffalo to Hudson River and New York City.
- The Peter Robinson settlement brings 2,000 poor Irish families to Scott's Plains (now Peterborough, Ontario)

== Births ==
- February 24 – Richard William Scott, politician and Minister (died 1913)
- March 22 – Jane Mackenzie, second wife of Alexander Mackenzie, 2nd Prime Minister of Canada (died 1893)
- March 24 – Joseph-Octave Beaubien, physician and politician (died 1877)
- April 13 – D'Arcy McGee, journalist, politician and Father of Confederation, assassinated (died 1868)
- May 25 – William Hallett Ray, politician, (died 1909)
- May 29 – William Henry Pope, lawyer, politician, judge and a Father of Confederation (died 1879)
- July 29 – Thomas McGreevy, politician and contractor (died 1897)
- August 12 – Louis-Charles Boucher de Niverville, lawyer and politician (died 1869)
- August 20 – Amor De Cosmos, journalist, politician and 2nd Premier of British Columbia (died 1897)

=== Full date unknown ===
- Big Bear, Cree leader (died 1888)
