= 1879 in Canada =

- Decades: 1850s; 1860s; 1870s; 1880s; 1890s
- See also: History of Canada; Timeline of Canadian history; List of years in Canada

Events from the year 1879 in Canada.

== Incumbents ==
=== Crown ===
- Monarch – Victoria

=== Federal government ===
- Governor General – John Campbell, Marquess of Lorne
- Prime Minister – John A. Macdonald
- Chief Justice – William Buell Richards (Ontario) (until 10 January) then William Johnstone Ritchie (New Brunswick) (from 11 January)
- Parliament – 4th (from 13 February)

=== Provincial governments ===
==== Lieutenant governors ====
- Lieutenant Governor of British Columbia – Albert Norton Richards
- Lieutenant Governor of Manitoba – Joseph-Édouard Cauchon
- Lieutenant Governor of New Brunswick – Edward Barron Chandler
- Lieutenant Governor of Nova Scotia – Adams George Archibald
- Lieutenant Governor of Ontario – Donald Alexander Macdonald
- Lieutenant Governor of Prince Edward Island – Robert Hodgson (until July 10) then Thomas Heath Haviland
- Lieutenant Governor of Quebec – Luc Letellier de St-Just (until July 26) then Théodore Robitaille

==== Premiers ====
- Premier of British Columbia – George Anthony Walkem
- Premier of Manitoba – John Norquay
- Premier of New Brunswick – John James Fraser
- Premier of Nova Scotia – Simon Hugh Holmes
- Premier of Ontario – Oliver Mowat
- Premier of Prince Edward Island – Louis Henry Davies (until April 25) then William Wilfred Sullivan
- Premier of Quebec – Henri-Gustave Joly de Lotbinière (until October 31) then Joseph-Adolphe Chapleau

=== Territorial governments ===
==== Lieutenant governors ====
- Lieutenant Governor of Keewatin – Joseph-Édouard Cauchon
- Lieutenant Governor of the North-West Territories – David Laird

== Events ==
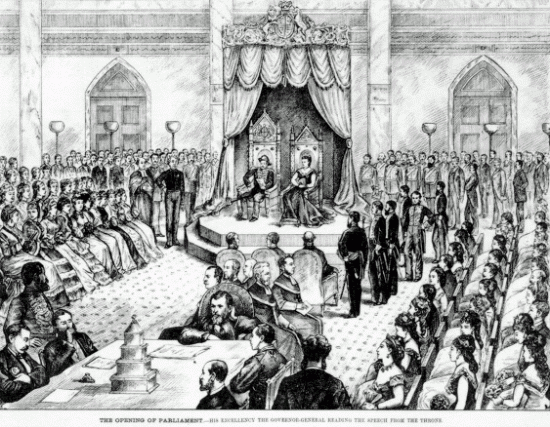
The Opening of Canadian Parliament in 1879.

- February 4 – Prince Edward Island election: William Wilfred Sullivan's Conservatives win a third consecutive majority.
- March 12 – Sir John A. Macdonald introduces protective tariffs on manufactured goods being imported into Canada, a transcontinental railway, and immigration to the west in his National Policy.
- April 25 – Sir William Wilfred Sullivan becomes premier of Prince Edward Island, replacing Sir Louis Davies.
- June 5 – Ontario election: Sir Oliver Mowat's Liberals win a third consecutive majority.
- June 27 - Murder of Mary Gallagher in Griffintown, Montreal
- (date unknown) – The Toronto Industrial Exhibition opens for the first time, precursor to the Canadian National Exhibition.
- October 31 – Sir Joseph-Adolphe Chapleau becomes premier of Quebec, replacing Henri-Gustave de Lotbinière.
- December 16 – Manitoba election.
- December 19 – Swift Runner is hanged in Fort Saskatchewan, NWT, for murdering and then eating eight members of his own family over the previous winter. He believed he was possessed by Wendigo, a terrifying mythological creature with a ravenous appetite for human flesh.

== Births ==
=== January to June ===
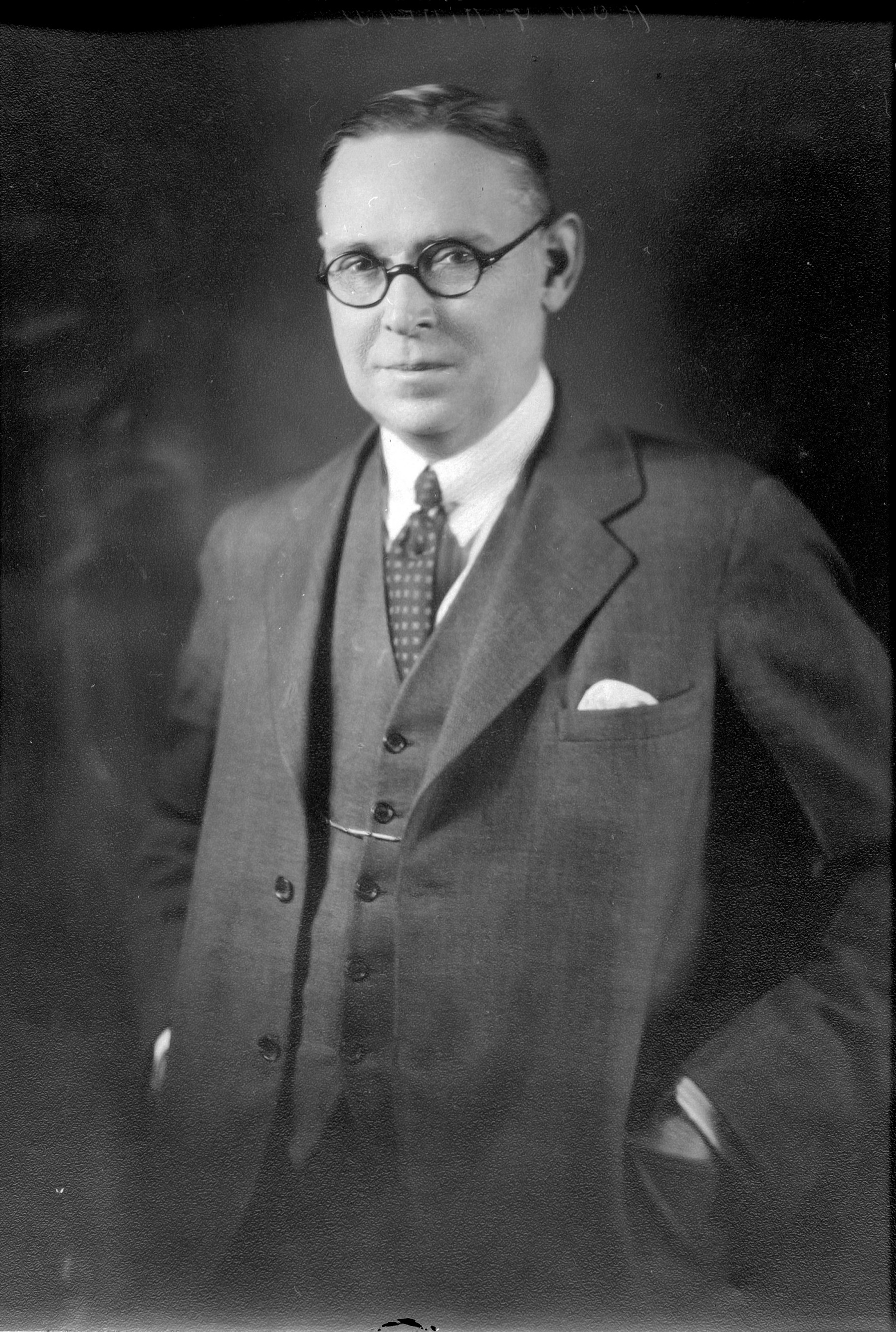
Richard Gavin Reid

- January 15 – Mazo de la Roche, author (d.1961)
- January 17 – Richard Gavin Reid, politician and 7th Premier of Alberta (d.1980)
- January 25 – Humphrey T. Walwyn, naval officer and Governor of Newfoundland (d.1957)
- March 20 – Maud Menten, medical scientist (d.1960)
- May 25 – Max Aitken, 1st Baron Beaverbrook, business tycoon, politician and writer (d.1964)
- June 12 – Charles Dow Richards, judge, politician and 18th Premier of New Brunswick (d.1956)

=== July to December ===
- August 1 – Eva Tanguay, singer and entertainer (d.1947)
- August 16 – Samuel Lawrence, politician and trade unionist (d.1959)
- October 6 – James Langstaff Bowman, politician and Speaker of the House of Commons of Canada (d.1951)
- October 9 – William Warren, lawyer, politician, judge and Prime Minister of Newfoundland (d.1927)
- November 3 – Vilhjalmur Stefansson, Arctic explorer and ethnologist (d.1962)
- November 11 – Violet McNaughton, feminist (d. 1953)
- November 25 – Joseph-Arsène Bonnier, politician (d.1962)
- December 10 – P. L. Robertson, inventor (d. 1951)
- December 24 – Émile Nelligan, poet (d.1941)

== Deaths ==
- January 4 – Pierre-Alexis Tremblay, politician (b.1827)
- January 16 – Octave Crémazie, poet (b.1827)
- April 4 – Jean-Baptiste Thibault, missionary and a Father of Confederation (b.1810)
- October 7 – William Henry Pope, lawyer, politician, judge and a Father of Confederation (b.1825)

== Historical documents ==
- The federal government proposes to provide 100 million acres of Dominion land for the construction of the Canadian Pacific Railway for settlement.
- Report claims only self-reliance and industry can relieve distress of Indigenous people and anxiety of Metis (Note: racial stereotypes)
- Ottawa memo outlines the "utter destitution" of some Indigenous people in the Northwest Territories
- Federal commissioner reports on the dependency of Indigenous people at Fort Walsh
- Visitor fears the Metis on the Assiniboine River will not hold on to their lands much longer
- Description of Mennonite cooperative farming near Winnipeg
- All aboard the steamer Waubuno are lost in a gale on Georgian Bay
- Anti-Irish-Catholic opinion is published in the Irish Canadian
- "Alouette" first sung as a Canadian folk song.
