= 1897 in Canada =

- Decades: 1870s; 1880s; 1890s; 1900s; 1910s
- See also: History of Canada; Timeline of Canadian history; List of years in Canada

Events from the year 1897 in Canada.

== Incumbents ==
=== Crown ===
- Monarch – Victoria

=== Federal government ===
- Governor General – John Hamilton-Gordon
- Prime Minister – Wilfrid Laurier
- Chief Justice – Samuel Henry Strong (Ontario)
- Parliament – 8th

=== Provincial governments ===
==== Lieutenant governors ====
- Lieutenant Governor of British Columbia – Edgar Dewdney (until November 18) then Thomas Robert McInnes
- Lieutenant Governor of Manitoba – James Colebrooke Patterson
- Lieutenant Governor of New Brunswick – Jabez Bunting Snowball
- Lieutenant Governor of Nova Scotia – Malachy Bowes Daly
- Lieutenant Governor of Ontario – Casimir Gzowski (acting) (until November 18) then Oliver Mowat
- Lieutenant Governor of Prince Edward Island – George William Howlan
- Lieutenant Governor of Quebec – Joseph-Adolphe Chapleau

==== Premiers ====
- Premier of British Columbia – John Herbert Turner
- Premier of Manitoba – Thomas Greenway
- Premier of New Brunswick – James Mitchell (until October 29) then Henry Emmerson
- Premier of Nova Scotia – George Henry Murray
- Premier of Ontario – Arthur Sturgis Hardy
- Premier of Prince Edward Island – Frederick Peters (until October 1) then Alexander Warburton
- Premier of Quebec – Edmund James Flynn (until May 24) then Félix-Gabriel Marchand

=== Territorial governments ===
==== Commissioners ====
- Commissioner of Yukon – James Morrow Walsh (from August 17)

==== Lieutenant governors ====
- Lieutenant Governor of Keewatin – James Colebrooke Patterson
- Lieutenant Governor of the North-West Territories – Charles Herbert Mackintosh

==== Premiers ====
- Chairman of the executive committee of the North-West Territories then Premier of North-West Territories – Frederick Haultain (from October 7)

== Events ==
- January 29 – The Victorian Order of Nurses is founded in Ottawa.
- February 2 – Clara Brett Martin becomes the first woman to practise law in Ontario.
- February 19 – World's first Women's Institute founded in Stoney Creek, Ontario.
- May 24 – Félix-Gabriel Marchand becomes premier of Quebec, replacing Edmund Flynn.
- May 24 – Lion of Belfort (Montreal) unveiled.
- June 20 – Diamond Jubilee of Victoria's accession as Queen.
- September 6 – The federal government gives the CPR a grant to allow it to reduce freight rates through Crowsnest Pass.
- October – A.B. Warburton becomes Premier of Prince Edward Island.
- October 7 – Responsible government is introduced in the North-West Territories: Frederick Haultain becomes the first premier.
- October 29 – Henry Emmerson becomes premier of New Brunswick, replacing James Mitchell.

=== Full date unknown ===
- Klondike Gold Rush rages in the Yukon.
- Lord Grey proposes that Canada create a navy to protect its west coast; Prime Minister Laurier does not act on the recommendation.
- 1897–1912 – 961,000 people enter Canada from the British Isles, 594,000 from Europe and 784,000 from the United States..
- The first Canadian movie, Ten Years in Manitoba.

== Births ==
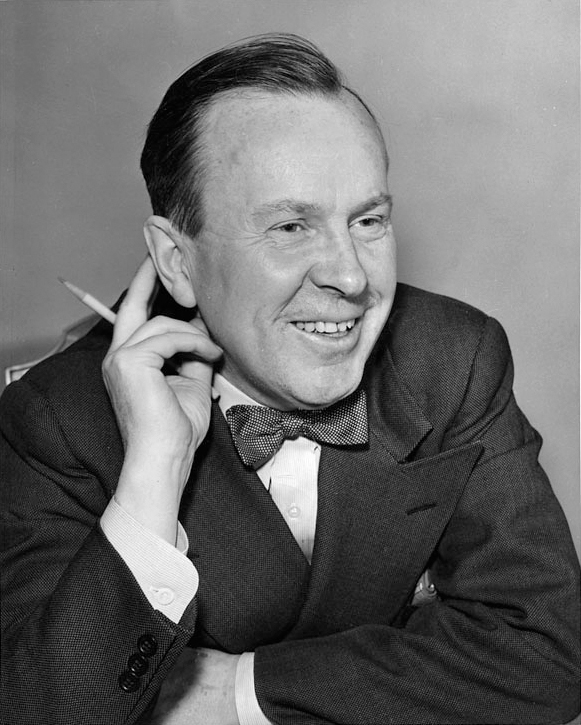
Lester Bowles Pearson in 1944

- January 23 – William Stephenson, soldier, airman, businessperson, inventor and spymaster (d.1989)
- January 27 – Charles Stephen Booth, politician and barrister (d.1988)
- March 9 – Sidney Earle Smith, academic and seventh President of the University of Toronto (d.1959)
- April 23 – Lester B. Pearson, politician, 14th Prime Minister of Canada, diplomat and 1957 Nobel Peace Prize recipient (d.1972)
- June 29 – Fulgence Charpentier, French Canadian journalist, editor and publisher (d. 2001)
- September 23 – Walter Pidgeon, actor (d.1984)
- September 29 – Graham Towers, first Governor of the Bank of Canada (d.1975)
- November 30 – William Murdoch Buchanan, politician (d.1966)
- December 7 – Gordon Graydon, politician (d.1953)

== Deaths ==
- January 2 – Thomas McGreevy, politician and contractor (b.1825)
- February 27 – James Austin, businessman (b.1813)
- July 4 – Amor De Cosmos, journalist, politician and 2nd Premier of British Columbia (b.1825)
- September 19 – Frederick Cope, 3rd Mayor of Vancouver (b.1860)
- October 21 – Philip Francis Little, 1st Premier of Newfoundland of the colonial (b.1824)
- December 14 – Robert Simpson, businessman and founder of Simpsons (b.1834)
- December 15 – James Mitchell, politician and 7th Premier of New Brunswick (b.1843)
- December 31 – David Oppenheimer, entrepreneur and 2nd Mayor of Vancouver (b.1832)
