= 1826 in Canada =

- Decades: 1800s; 1810s; 1820s; 1830s; 1840s
- See also: History of Canada; Timeline of Canadian history; List of years in Canada

Events from the year 1826 in Canada.

== Incumbents ==
- Monarch: George IV

=== Federal government ===
- Parliament of Lower Canada: 12th
- Parliament of Upper Canada: 9th

=== Governors ===
- Governor of the Canadas: George Ramsay
- Governor of New Brunswick: Howard Douglas
- Governor of Nova Scotia: James Kempt
- Commodore-Governor of Newfoundland: Thomas John Cochrane
- Governor of Prince Edward Island: Charles Douglass Smith
- Governor of Upper Canada: Peregrine Maitland

== Events ==
- June 8 – A mob of the ruling party, the Family Compact, destroy the Colonial Advocate's press at York. Wilton, Carol. William Lyon Mackenzie, publisher, prosecutes and is awarded £625 in damages.
- September 21 – Construction of the Rideau Canal begins.

== Births ==
- March 10 – Louis-Ovide Brunet, priest and botanist (died 1876)
- March 17 – Alexander Morris, politician, Minister and 2nd Lieutenant Governor of Manitoba (died 1889)
- June 11 – James Colledge Pope, politician and 5th Premier of Prince Edward Island (died 1885)
- June 21 – Frederick Hamilton-Temple-Blackwood, 1st Marquess of Dufferin and Ava, Governor General of Canada (died 1902)
- June 23 – Louis Babel, priest (d. 1912)
- June 29 – Robert Christie, Ontario businessman and politician (died 1914)
- July 21 – Hugh Richardson, jurist (died 1913)
- August 25 – Hector-Louis Langevin, lawyer, politician and a Father of Confederation (died 1906)
- September 17 – Jean-Baptiste-Éric Dorion, journalist and politician (died 1866)

== Deaths ==
- November 18 – James Monk, chief justice
