= 1891 in Canada =

- Decades: 1870s; 1880s; 1890s; 1900s; 1910s
- See also: History of Canada; Timeline of Canadian history; List of years in Canada

Events from the year 1891 in Canada.

== Incumbents ==
=== Crown ===
- Monarch – Victoria

=== Federal government ===
- Governor General – Frederick Stanley
- Prime Minister – John A. Macdonald (until June 6) then John Abbott (from June 16)
- Chief Justice – William Johnstone Ritchie (New Brunswick)
- Parliament – 6th (until 3 February) then 7th (from 29 April)

=== Provincial governments ===
==== Lieutenant governors ====
- Lieutenant Governor of British Columbia – Hugh Nelson
- Lieutenant Governor of Manitoba – John Christian Schultz
- Lieutenant Governor of New Brunswick – Samuel Leonard Tilley
- Lieutenant Governor of Nova Scotia – Malachy Bowes Daly
- Lieutenant Governor of Ontario – Alexander Campbell
- Lieutenant Governor of Prince Edward Island – Jedediah Slason Carvell
- Lieutenant Governor of Quebec – Auguste-Réal Angers

==== Premiers ====
- Premier of British Columbia – John Robson
- Premier of Manitoba – Thomas Greenway
- Premier of New Brunswick – Andrew George Blair
- Premier of Nova Scotia – William Stevens Fielding
- Premier of Ontario – Oliver Mowat
- Premier of Prince Edward Island – Neil McLeod (until April 27) then Frederick Peters
- Premier of Quebec – Honoré Mercier (until December 21) then Charles Boucher de Boucherville

=== Territorial governments ===
==== Lieutenant governors ====
- Lieutenant Governor of Keewatin – John Christian Schultz
- Lieutenant Governor of the North-West Territories – Joseph Royal

==== Premiers ====
- Chairman of the Lieutenant-Governor's Advisory Council of the North-West Territories then Chairman of the Executive Committee of the North-West Territories – Robert Brett (until November 7) then Frederick Haultain

== Events ==
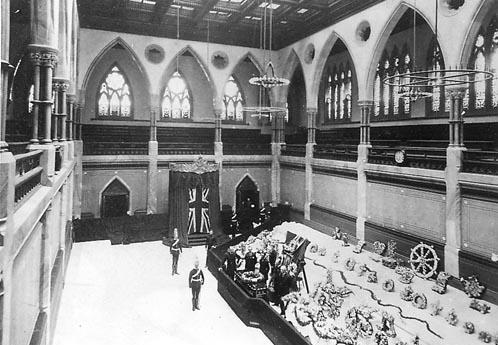
Prime Minister Sir John A. Macdonald lying in state in the Senate Chamber

- February 21 – The first Springhill Mining Disaster occurs killing 125.
- March 5 – Federal election: Sir John A. Macdonald's Conservatives win a fourth consecutive majority.
- April 27 – Frederick Peters becomes premier of Prince Edward Island, replacing Neil McLeod.
- June 6 – Prime Minister Sir John A. Macdonald dies in office.
- June 8 – Prime Minister Sir John A. Macdonald lies in state in the Senate Chamber.
- June 16 – Sir John Abbott becomes prime minister.
- September 29 – Thomas McGreevy is expelled from the House of Commons due to corruption.
- November 7 – The election of the 2nd North-West Legislative Assembly.
- December 10 – The Calgary and Edmonton Railway opens, connecting Edmonton to the national railway network for the first time.
- December 21 – Sir Charles-Eugène de Boucherville becomes premier of Quebec for the second time, replacing Honoré Mercier.
- The Legislative Council of New Brunswick is abolished.

== Sport ==
- The Canadian Rugby Football Union is renamed the Canadian Rugby Union

== Births ==
=== January to June ===
- January 6 – Tim Buck, politician and long-time leader of the Communist Party of Canada (d.1973)
- January 26 – Wilder Penfield, neurosurgeon (d.1976)
- April 1 – Harry Nixon, politician and 13th Premier of Ontario (d.1961)
- May 3 – Thomas John Bentley, politician (d.1983)
- June 13 – Hervé-Edgar Brunelle, politician and lawyer (d.1950)

=== July to December ===
- July 12 – Adhémar Raynault, politician and Mayor of Montreal (d.1984)
- August 30 – Elmer Jamieson, educator
- September 16 – Julie Winnefred Bertrand, supercentenarian, oldest living Canadian and oldest verified living recognized woman at the time of her death (d.2007)
- October 30 – Ada Mackenzie, golfer
- November 14 – Frederick Banting, medical scientist, doctor and Nobel laureate (d.1941)
- December 10 – Harold Alexander, 1st Earl Alexander of Tunis, military commander and Governor General of Canada (d.1969)
- December 25 – William Ross Macdonald, politician, Speaker of the House of Commons of Canada and 21st Lieutenant Governor of Ontario (d.1976)

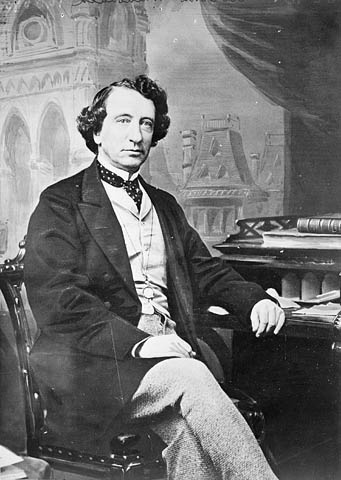
John A. Macdonald

== Deaths ==
- January 4 – Antoine Labelle, priest and settler (b.1833)
- January 21 – Calixa Lavallée, musician and composer (b.1842)
- May 31 – Antoine-Aimé Dorion, politician and jurist (b.1818)
- June 6 – John A. Macdonald, politician and 1st Prime Minister of Canada (b.1815)
