= Harry Taylor (swimmer) =

Canadian swimmer

Personal information
- Full name: Harry Taylor
- National team: Canada
- Born: 1968 (age 57–58) Edmonton, Alberta
- Height: 1.83 m (6 ft 0 in)
- Weight: 65 kg (143 lb)

Sport
- Sport: Swimming
- Strokes: Freestyle
- Club: Edmonton Keyano Swim Club

Harry Taylor (born 1968) is a Canadian former international freestyle swimmer who competed for his native country at the 1988 Summer Olympics in Seoul, South Korea.

At the 1986 World Aquatics Championships, Taylor set a Canadian record in the 1500-metre freestyle. He again set a Canadian record of 15:12.63 in January 1990. That record was held until 2004 when it was bettered by Kurtis MacGillivary.

At the 1988 Summer Olympics, Taylor competed in the preliminary heats of the men's 1500-metre freestyle, and finished nineteenth overall.
