= William John Rose =

Canadian historian (1885–1968)

William John Rose (7 August 1885 – 10 March 1968) was a Canadian slavist and historian. He served as the director of the School of Slavonic and East European Studies from 1945 to 1947.
