= Patrick Critton =

American skyjacker (born 1947)

Patrick Dolan Critton (born 1947) is an American former teacher and the first successful aircraft hijacker in Canada.

== Early life ==
Critton attended Dewitt Clinton High School in The Bronx, New York City. He later joined the Republic of New Africa movement. Critton was involved in several robberies and was allegedly involved in manufacturing explosives at an East Village tenement.

== Background ==
On December 26, 1971, Critton boarded Air Canada Flight 932, a DC-9, in Thunder Bay, Ontario bound for Toronto. Armed with a handgun and a grenade, he demanded the plane to fly to Havana, Cuba. At the time of the incident, Critton mistakenly thought he was a fugitive in New York City for a series of crimes, including bank robbery. He had fled to Canada, where he continued a life of crime.

He released all passengers in Toronto on his way to Havana and after he deplaned in Havana, the plane returned to Toronto safely with the crew members onboard. No injuries or casualties were caused during the hijacking.

== Post hijacking life ==
Canada did not have an extradition agreement with Cuba regarding hijacking at the time. After arriving in Cuba, Critton served an 8-month prison sentence. Following his sentence, he first worked in the sugar cane industry in Cuba. Two years later, he moved to Tanzania, where he became a teacher. He later married and had two children before returning to the United States in 1994, feeling safe from the time passed since the hijacking. At the time of his arrest, he was working at A.B. Middle School in Mount Vernon, New York.

Critton remained a fugitive until 2001, when he was found by a Canadian detective through a Google search, which at that time produced a single hit with his name that revealed the location where he was teaching. The one hit was a March 2001 article describing his mentoring of black youth in New York City.

== Capture and aftermath ==
Critton was arrested on September 10, 2001 after nearly 30 years. Fingerprints on a ginger ale can he consumed on the plane linked Critton to the hijacking. Canadian prosecutors, in order to avoid prejudicing the jury, based on the views of the recent September 11 attacks, which had happened the day after Critton was arrested, portrayed Critton to jurors not as a terrorist, but as a kidnapper and robber whose motivation was to gain the flight to Cuba.

Critton received a five-year prison sentence for the crimes. He was released in June 2003 after 1 year and 10 months and deported to the United States.
