= Jean Boudreau =

Canadian politician

Jean Boudreau (1748 – August 31, 1827) was a political figure in Lower Canada.

He was born in Acadia, probably at Port Royal, in 1748, the son of Charles Boudrot, a descendant of one of the first settlers at Port Royal. Jean and his parents escaped the Great Upheaval in 1755 and travelled to Quebec City via New Brunswick in 1757. Around 1764, the family settled at Deschambault, where his older sister had married the seigneur Louis Fleury de la Gorgendière. Boudreau became a navigator for ships travelling the Saint Lawrence River. In 1792, he was elected to represent Hampshire in the Legislative Assembly of Lower Canada. He served as a lieutenant in the local militia during the War of 1812.

His son Jean married Marie-Josephte, the sister of Louis-Michel Viger.

He died at Deschambault in 1827.
