= The Canadian Rockies Trail Guide =

Guide book on hiking trails in the Canadian Rockies

First edition

The Canadian Rockies Trail Guide by Brian Patton and Bart Robinson, describes 225 hiking and backpacking trails in the Canadian Rockies, including in Banff National Park and Jasper National Park. The first edition was published in 1971, with subsequent editions in 1978, 1986, 1990, 1992, 1994, 2000, 2007, 2011, and 2022 (10th edition). The book is published by Summerthought Publishing of Banff, Alberta. Trail updates are supplied by the book's authors on their Canadian Rockies hiking blog.

The Trail Guide is one of the best-selling non-fiction books in Canada, often referred to as a "bible" by hikers. Its first seven editions sold more than 230,000 copies.

For the first edition, the two authors hiked 108 trails with a custom-built trail odometer, which allowed them to measure trail distances more accurately than the Parks Canada trail signs.

For each trail, the book lists:

- the length of time normally required to complete the trail
- the amount of elevation gain or loss, in metres and feet
- the maximum elevation in metres and feet
- the topographic map(s) covering the area
- how to get to the trailhead including GPS
- distances, in kilometres, to notable features along the way
- detailed description

The Whyte Museum hosted a retrospective exhibit for the book's fortieth anniversary in 2011.
