= Olivier Maurault =

Canadian historian (1886–1968)

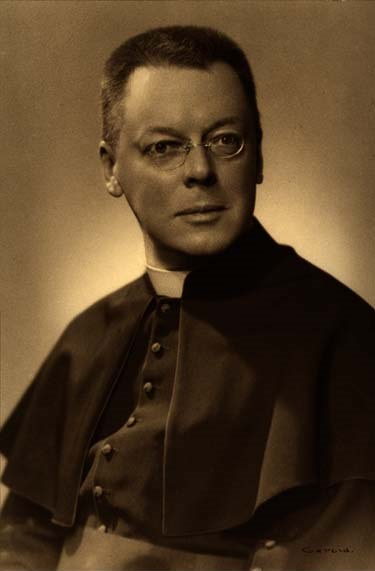

Monsignor Olivier Maurault, CMG, FRSC (1 January 1886 – 14 August 1968) was a Canadian historian, priest of the Society of the Priests of Saint Sulpice, and academic administrator. He was Rector of the Université de Montréal from 1934 to 1955.

He was President of the Royal Society of Canada in 1943–1944.
