= Wallace Samuel Bird =

23rd lieutenant governor of New Brunswick

The Honourable Wallace Samuel Bird

23rd Lieutenant Governor of New Brunswick
- In office January 31, 1968 – October 2, 1971
- Monarch: Elizabeth II
- Governor General: Roland Michener
- Premier: Louis Robichaud; Richard Hatfield
- Preceded by: John B. McNair
- Succeeded by: Hédard Robichaud

Personal details
- Born: December 7, 1917 Marysville, New Brunswick, Canada
- Died: October 2, 1971 (aged 53)

Wallace Samuel Bird (December 7, 1917 – October 2, 1971) was a Canadian businessman and the 23rd Lieutenant Governor of New Brunswick since Canadian Confederation.

Born in Marysville, New Brunswick, the son of Charles Bird, he started working with his father in the construction industry after finishing high school. During World War II, he worked with the Saint John Drydock and Shipbuilding Company converting ships to be used in the war. After the war, he started working for Mussens Limited, a Canadian construction equipment firm where he would become Executive Vice-president. In 1968, he was appointed Lieutenant Governor of New Brunswick and served until his death in 1971.

In 1941, he married Phyllis Mildred Bailey. They had four children: Richard, David, Nancy, and Michael.
