= Skinner Poulin =

Canadian ice hockey player

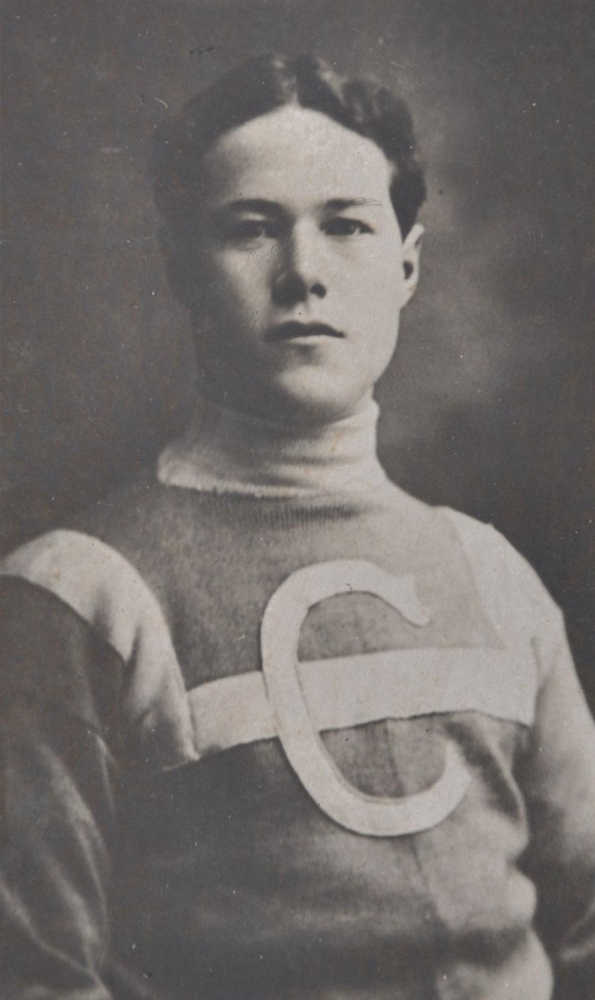
- Poulin with the Montreal Canadiens in 1910.
- Born: September 17, 1887 Smith's Falls, Ontario, Canada
- Died: May 3, 1971 (aged 83) Saskatoon, Saskatchewan, Canada
- Height: 5 ft 6 in (168 cm)
- Weight: 155 lb (70 kg; 11 st 1 lb)
- Position: Centre
- Shot: Left
- Played for: Portage la Prairie; Winnipeg Maple Leafs; Galt Professionals; Victoria Aristocrats; Montreal Canadiens; Saskatoon Crescents
- Playing career: 1904–1921

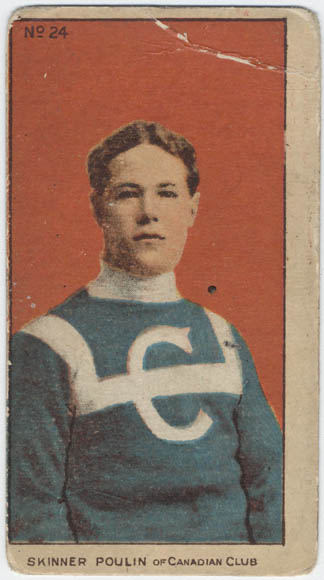
A tobacco trading card (ACC designation of C56) showing Poulin in the original Canadiens uniform of 1910.

George Vincent "Skinner" Poulin (September 17, 1887 – May 3, 1971) was a professional ice hockey player who played for the Montreal Canadiens in the National Hockey Association and the Victoria Aristocrats in the Pacific Coast Hockey Association. He was part of the original Montreal Canadiens team in the 1910 season and played in the team's first game on January 5, 1910.

Poulin won a Stanley Cup with the Canadiens in 1916.

During the tail-end of his playing career, while playing in Saskatoon, Poulin became engaged as a referee, and for the 1922–23 WCHL season he was appointed referee-in-chief for the league.

== Playing style ==
Poulin, standing at five feet and six inches, was a fairly small forward among his contemporaries, but he deployed a physically engaging style of play to compensate for his lack of height and weight. In the local Victoria newspapers, while playing for the Victoria Aristocrats in the PCHA, he was often referred to as the "pepper box", in reference to his aggressive and peppery playing style.

When the PCHA, prior to the 1914–15 season, lay forward a rule change that would prevent body-checking from within ten feet of the fence, Poulin voiced his displeasure and claimed that ice hockey was the only sport where a light man like himself could use his body to his advantage. Poulin claimed that hard checking and Victoria's "get the man" tactics had played a large part in the club winning two consecutive PCHA championships in 1913 and 1914.

Despite Poulin's fears of a less hard-hitting league in 1914–15 he continued to deploy a physically engaging style of hockey which led to him leading the PCHA in penalty minutes that season, something he had also done the season prior, earning him the "bad man" moniker of Pacific coast hockey for a second consecutive year.

== Career statistics ==
			Regular Season					Playoffs
Season	Team	League	GP	G	A	Pts	PIM	GP	G	A	Pts	PIM
1904–05	Smiths Falls Mic-Macs	OHA Jr	data not available
1905–06	Smiths Falls Mic-Macs	OHA	data not available
1906–07	Smiths Falls Mic-Macs	OHA	4	19	0	19	–	3	4	0	4	0
1907–08	Portage la Prairie	Man-Pro	15	14	0	14	–	–	–	–	–	–
1908–09	Winnipeg Maple Leafs	Man-Pro	4	7	3	10	18	–	–	–	–	–
	Winnipeg Maple Leafs	Man-Pro	4	5	1	6	0	–	–	–	–	–
1909–10	Galt Professionals	OPHL	2	2	0	2	3	–	–	–	–	–
	Montreal Canadiens	NHA	12	8	0	8	53	–	–	–	–	–
1910–11	Montreal Canadiens	NHA	15	3	0	3	61	–	–	–	–	–
1911–12	Victoria Aristocrats	PCHA	16	9	0	9	50	–	–	–	–	–
1912–13	Victoria Aristocrats	PCHA	15	6	4	10	63	3	2	0	2	0
1913–14	Victoria Aristocrats	PCHA	15	9	7	16	40	–	–	–	–	–
1914	Victoria Aristocrats	Stanley Cup	–	–	–	–	–	3	1	0	1	0
1914–15	Victoria Aristocrats	PCHA	16	4	4	8	52	–	–	–	–	–
1915–16	Montreal Canadiens	NHA	16	5	1	6	43	3	1	0	1	9
1916–17	Montreal Canadiens	NHA	4	0	0	0	0	–	–	–	–	–
	Montreal Wanderers	NHA	6	3	0	3	0	–	–	–	–	–
1917–18			Did not play
1918–19	Victoria Aristocrats	PCHA	1	0	0	0	0	–	–	–	–	–
1919–20	Saskatoon Crescents	N-SSHL	12	4	2	6	31	–	–	–	–	–
1920–21	Saskatoon Crescents	N-SSHL	4	1	1	2	11	4	0	0	0	3
1921–22	Saskatoon Sheiks	WCHL	2	0	1	1	0	–	–	–	–	–
PCHA totals			63	28	15	43	205	3	2	0	2	0
NHA totals			53	19	1	20	157	3	1	0	1	9
WCHL totals			2	0	1	1	0	–	–	–	–	–
