= Thomas Nickleson Jeffery =

Canadian politician

Thomas Nickleson Jeffery (1782 – October 21, 1847) was a colonial official and politician in Nova Scotia.

He was born in Dorset, England. In 1798 he became an audit clerk in London and was, due to assistance from William Pitt the Younger, appointed collector of customs in Halifax, Nova Scotia. Though the salary was small Jefferey benefitted from lucrative fees.

In 1805 he married Martha Maria Uniacke, daughter of Richard John Uniacke who was one of the wealthiest men and influential figures in the province. In 1810, Jeffery was appointed to the Nova Scotia Council and supported Uniacke's high church Toryism.

In 1828 and again in 1834, Jeffrey was Acting Lieutenant Governor of Nova Scotia pending the arrival of permanent viceroys. Joseph Howe praised Jeffrey's administration in 1834 writing that “Mr. Jeffery’s administration has been highly acceptable to all classes,” and stating that Jeffrey had attempted “on all occasions . . . to preserve the peace and promote the welfare of the country.”

When the Legislative and Executive Council of Nova Scotia were split into separate bodies in 1838, Jeffery was appointed to the latter institution. He resigned in 1840 to make room for the appointment of members of the Reform party.

In 1815, Jeffrey was given responsibility for the settlement of Black refugees following the War of 1812 and settled some families on his lands by the Shubenacadie River.

Political offices
| Preceded by James Kempt | Lieutenant Governor of Nova Scotia (acting); 1828 | Succeeded by Peregrine Maitland |
| Preceded by Peregrine Maitland | Lieutenant Governor of Nova Scotia (acting); 1834 | Succeeded by Colin Campbell |
