= 1819 in Canada =

- Decades: 1790s; 1800s; 1810s; 1820s; 1830s
- See also: History of Canada; Timeline of Canadian history; List of years in Canada

Events from the year 1819 in Canada.

== Incumbents ==
- Monarch: George III

=== Federal government ===
- Parliament of Lower Canada: 9th
- Parliament of Upper Canada: 7th

=== Governors ===
- Governor of the Canadas: Robert Milnes
- Governor of New Brunswick: George Stracey Smyth
- Governor of Nova Scotia: John Coape Sherbrooke
- Commodore-Governor of Newfoundland: Richard Goodwin Keats
- Governor of Prince Edward Island: Charles Douglass Smith

== Events ==
- Cape Breton Island is annexed to Nova Scotia.

== Births ==
- February 12
  - Frederick Carter, Premier of Newfoundland (d.1900)
  - Eden Colvile, Governor of Rupert's Land (d.1893)
- February 13 — James Cockburn, politician (d.1883)
- March 1 — Alexander Melville Bell, educator (d.1905)
- April 18 — James Gibb Ross, merchant and politician (d.1888)
- August 10 — Patrick Leonard MacDougall, General and author (d.1894)
- October 3 — Charles-Joseph Coursol, lawyer, politician and 13th Mayor of Montreal (d.1888)
- October 10 — Charles Stanley Monck, 4th Viscount Monck, Governor General (d.1894)

=== Full date unknown ===
- Louis-Antoine Dessaulles, seigneur, journalist and politician (d.1895)

== Deaths ==
- March – Nonosabasut, Beothuk (indigenous Canadian) leader
- November 15 – Joseph Borneuf, Roman Catholic priest
