= 1896 in Canada =

- Decades: 1870s; 1880s; 1890s; 1900s; 1910s
- See also: History of Canada; Timeline of Canadian history; List of years in Canada

Events from the year 1896 in Canada.

== Incumbents ==
=== Crown ===
- Monarch – Victoria

=== Federal government ===
- Governor General – John Hamilton-Gordon
- Prime Minister – Mackenzie Bowell (until April 27) then Charles Tupper (May 1 to July 8) then Wilfrid Laurier (from July 11)
- Chief Justice – Samuel Henry Strong (Ontario)
- Parliament – 7th (until 24 April) then 8th (from 19 August)

=== Provincial governments ===
==== Lieutenant governors ====
- Lieutenant Governor of British Columbia – Edgar Dewdney
- Lieutenant Governor of Manitoba – James Colebrooke Patterson
- Lieutenant Governor of New Brunswick – John James Fraser (until November 24) then Jabez Bunting Snowball (from December 9)
- Lieutenant Governor of Nova Scotia – Malachy Bowes Daly
- Lieutenant Governor of Ontario – George Airey Kirkpatrick (until November 7) then Casimir Gzowski
- Lieutenant Governor of Prince Edward Island – George William Howlan
- Lieutenant Governor of Quebec – Joseph-Adolphe Chapleau

==== Premiers ====
- Premier of British Columbia – John Herbert Turner
- Premier of Manitoba – Thomas Greenway
- Premier of New Brunswick – Andrew George Blair (until July 17) then James Mitchell
- Premier of Nova Scotia – William Stevens Fielding (until July 18) then George Henry Murray (from July 20)
- Premier of Ontario – Oliver Mowat (until July 25) then Arthur Sturgis Hardy
- Premier of Prince Edward Island – Frederick Peters
- Premier of Quebec – Louis-Olivier Taillon (until May 11) then Edmund James Flynn

=== Territorial governments ===
==== Lieutenant governors ====
- Lieutenant Governor of Keewatin – James Colebrooke Patterson
- Lieutenant Governor of the North-West Territories – Charles Herbert Mackintosh

==== Premiers ====
- Chairman of the Executive Committee of the North-West Territories – Frederick Haultain

== Events ==
- April 27 – Sir Mackenzie Bowell resigns as Prime Minister due to cabinet infighting.
- May 1 – Sir Charles Tupper becomes prime minister.
- May 11 – Edmund Flynn becomes Premier of Quebec, replacing Sir Louis-Olivier Taillon.
- May 26 – A bridge collapse in Victoria, British Columbia kills 55 people.
- June 23 – Federal election: Wilfrid Laurier's Liberals win a majority, defeating Sir Charles Tupper's Conservatives. One of the key issues in the campaign has been the Manitoba Schools Question.
- July 11 – Wilfrid Laurier becomes prime minister.
- July 20 – George Henry Murray becomes premier of Nova Scotia, replacing William Fielding.
- July 25 – Arthur S. Hardy becomes premier of Ontario, replacing Sir Oliver Mowat.
- July – James Mitchell becomes premier of New Brunswick, replacing Andrew Blair.
- August 17 – Gold is discovered in the Yukon, prompting the Klondike gold rush.

=== Full date unknown ===
- A plan to populate the western prairies with immigration from eastern Europe is unveiled.
- The first Canadian blast furnace opens in Hamilton, Ontario.

== Sport ==
- February 14 – Winnipeg Victorias win their first Stanley Cup by defeating Montreal Victorias 2 goals to 0 at Montreal's Victoria Skating Rink

== Births ==
=== January to June ===
- March 8 – Charlotte Whitton, feminist, politician and mayor of Ottawa (d.1975)
- March 16 – Harry Banks, soldier
- March 21 – Errick Willis, politician (d.1967)
- April 11 – Léo-Paul Desrosiers, journalist, writer (d.1967)
- April 20 – Wilfrid R. "Wop" May, World War I flying ace and pioneering bush pilot (d.1952)
- May 2 – Elmore Philpott, journalist and politician (d.1964)
- May 18 – Brock Chisholm, doctor and first Director-General of the World Health Organization (d.1971)
- June 22 – Leonard W. Murray, naval officer (d.1971)

=== July to December ===
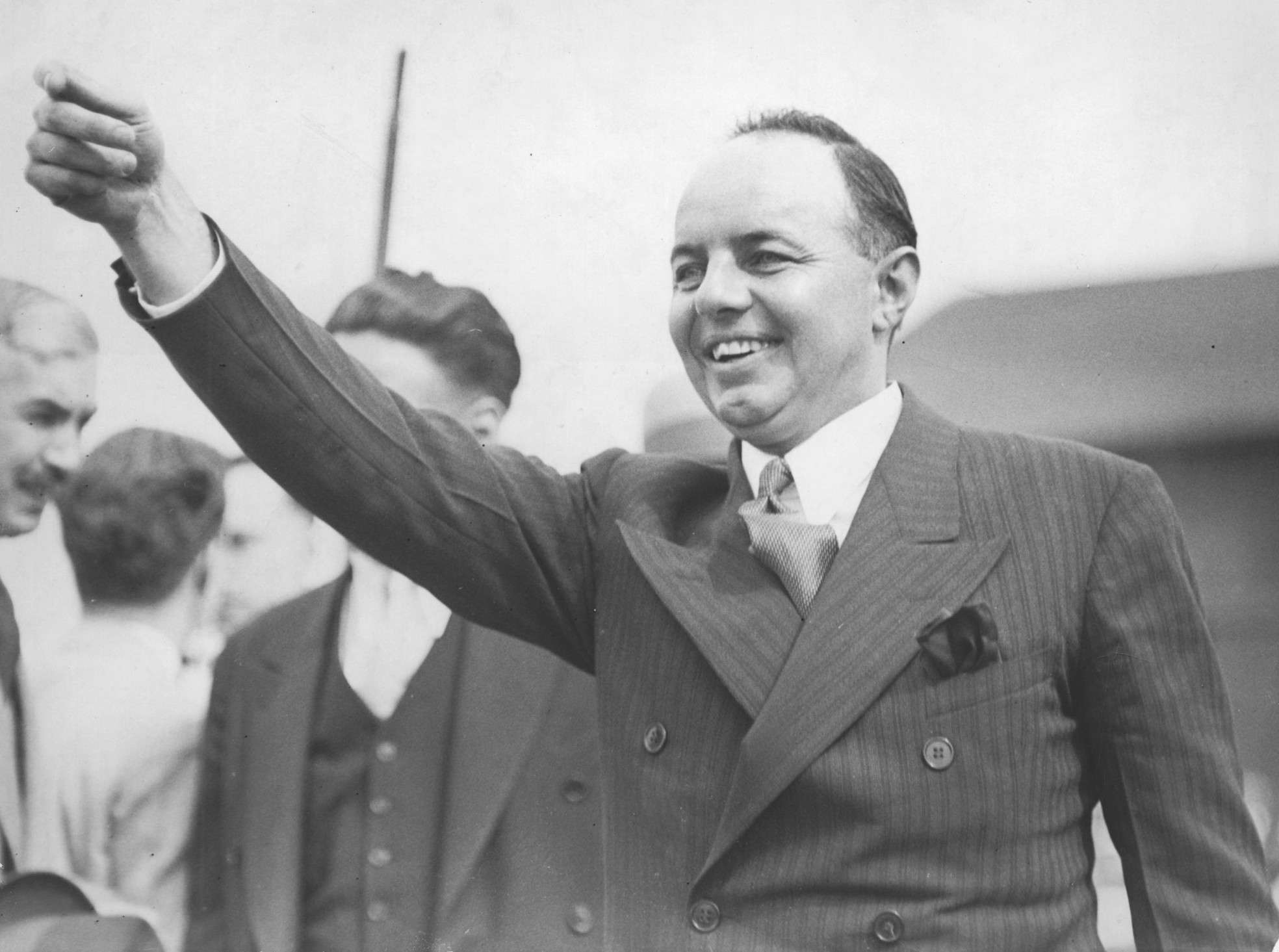
Mitchell Hepburn

- July 2 – Prudence Heward, painter (d.1947)
- July 4 – Frederick Cronyn Betts, politician (d.1938)
- July 10 – Thérèse Casgrain, feminist, reformer, politician and Senator (d.1981)
- July 13 – John Henry Cates, businessman and political figure (d.1986)
- July 27 – Anne Savage, painter and art teacher (d.1971)
- August 12 – Mitchell Hepburn, politician and 11th Premier of Ontario (d.1953)
- August 18 – Jack Pickford, actor (d.1933)
- August 30 – Raymond Massey, actor (d.1983)
- August 31 – Alice Strike, Canada's last surviving female World War I veteran (d.2004)
- November 3 – Madeleine Fritz, paleontologist (d.1990)
- November 7 – Henry Botterell, World War I fighter pilot (d.2003)

=== Full date unknown ===
- Jean Baptiste Paul, Canadian First Nations wrestler (d. 1966)

== Deaths ==
- January 14 – Christopher William Bunting, politician, merchant, newspaper owner and newspaper publisher (b.1837)
- February 20 – Hart Massey, businessman and philanthropist (b.1823)
- April 13 – John Christian Schultz, politician and Lieutenant-Governor of Manitoba (b.1840)
- May 4 – Timothy Anglin, politician and Speaker of the House of Commons of Canada (b.1822)
- June 7 – Wyatt Eaton, painter (b.1849)
- June 10 – Donald Alexander Macdonald, politician (b.1817)
- June 19 – John Beverley Robinson, politician (b.1821)
- June 25 – Samuel Leonard Tilley, Premier of New Brunswick (b. 1818)
- November 24 – John James Fraser, lawyer, judge, politician and 4th Premier of New Brunswick (b.1829)
- Anne Hill, dancer and actor (b. 1804)

== Historical documents ==
- Summary of Canada's imperial history and description of Governor General's Historical Ball
- Joshua Slocum sails Cape Horn solo on his globe-circling voyage
- Visitor describes constant boat traffic on the Muskoka Lakes, Ontario
