= 1952 in Canada =

- Decades: 1930s; 1940s; 1950s; 1960s; 1970s
- See also: History of Canada; Timeline of Canadian history; List of years in Canada

Events from the year 1952 in Canada.

== Incumbents ==
=== Crown ===
- Monarch – George VI (until February 6), then Elizabeth II

=== Federal government ===
- Governor General – the Viscount Alexander of Tunis (until February 28), then Vincent Massey
- Prime Minister – Louis St. Laurent
- Chief Justice – Thibaudeau Rinfret (Quebec)
- Parliament – 21st

=== Provincial governments ===
==== Lieutenant governors ====
- Lieutenant Governor of Alberta – John J. Bowlen
- Lieutenant Governor of British Columbia – Clarence Wallace
- Lieutenant Governor of Manitoba – Roland Fairbairn McWilliams
- Lieutenant Governor of New Brunswick – David Laurence MacLaren
- Lieutenant Governor of Newfoundland – Leonard Outerbridge
- Lieutenant Governor of Nova Scotia – John Alexander Douglas McCurdy (until September 1) then Alistair Fraser
- Lieutenant Governor of Ontario – Ray Lawson (until February 18) then Louis Orville Breithaupt
- Lieutenant Governor of Prince Edward Island – Thomas William Lemuel Prowse
- Lieutenant Governor of Quebec – Gaspard Fauteux
- Lieutenant Governor of Saskatchewan – William John Patterson

==== Premiers ====
- Premier of Alberta – Ernest Manning
- Premier of British Columbia – Byron Johnson (until August 1) then W.A.C. Bennett
- Premier of Manitoba – Douglas Campbell
- Premier of New Brunswick – John McNair (until October 8) then Hugh John Flemming
- Premier of Newfoundland – Joey Smallwood
- Premier of Nova Scotia – Angus Macdonald
- Premier of Ontario – Leslie Frost
- Premier of Prince Edward Island – J. Walter Jones
- Premier of Quebec – Maurice Duplessis
- Premier of Saskatchewan – Tommy Douglas

=== Territorial governments ===
==== Commissioners ====
- Commissioner of Yukon – Frederick Fraser (until November 5) then Wilfred George Brown
- Commissioner of Northwest Territories – Hugh Andrew Young

== Events ==
- January 24 – Vincent Massey appointed first Canada-born Governor General of Canada
- February 6 – Elizabeth II becomes Queen of Canada upon the death of her father George VI.
- June 11 – Saskatchewan election: Tommy Douglas's Co-operative Commonwealth Federation wins a third consecutive majority
- May 25 – Korean War: Canadian troops are dispatched to the troubled Geoje POW Camp
- July 16 – Quebec election: Maurice Duplessis' Union Nationale wins a third consecutive majority
- August 1 – W.A.C. Bennett becomes premier of British Columbia, replacing Byron Johnson
- August 5 – Alberta election: Ernest Manning's Social Credit Party wins a fifth consecutive majority
- September 6 – The first CBC Television station, CBFT, goes on the air in Montreal, Quebec
- September 8 – CBLT (CBC Toronto) goes on air
- September 11 – Volkswagen of Canada is founded.
- September 16 – The Boyd Gang is captured
- October 2 – Korean War: HMCS Iroquois, while shelling an enemy train in Korea, is hit by return fire from shore batteries. Three sailors were killed and 10 wounded: the only Royal Canadian Navy casualties of the war.
- October 8 – Hugh John Flemming becomes premier of New Brunswick, replacing John McNair
- October 14 – Lester B. Pearson is elected President of the United Nations General Assembly.

=== Full date unknown ===
- Fighting in the Korean War drags on as the factions attempt to negotiate an armistice.
- The pension system is reformed with the introduction of the Old Age Security Act.
- Roy Thomson acquires The Scotsman and emigrates to Britain
- Painters Eleven founded.
- Atomic Energy Canada founded.
- Manitoba women were first permitted to serve on juries. (New Brunswick women become jurors in 1954, and PEI women in 1966).

== Arts and literature ==
=== New books ===
- Thomas B. Costain: The Silver Chalice

=== Awards ===
- See 1952 Governor General's Awards for a complete list of winners and finalists for those awards.
- Stephen Leacock Award: Jan Hilliard, The Salt Box

== Sport ==
- February 24 – Canada men's national ice hockey team (represented by the Edmonton Mercurys) win their 7th (consecutive and last until 2002) Gold Medal at the 1952 Winter Olympics in Oslo, Norway
- April 15 – The Detroit Red Wings win their fifth Stanley Cup by defeating the Montreal Canadiens 4 games to 0.
- May 2 – The Ontario Hockey Association's Guelph Biltmores win their only Memorial Cup by defeating the Saskatchewan Junior Hockey League's Regina Pats 4 games to 0. The deciding Game 4 was played at Maple Leaf Gardens in Toronto
- November 29 – The Toronto Argonauts win their tenth (and last until 1983) Grey Cup by defeating the Edmonton Eskimos 21–11 in the 40th Grey Cup played at Toronto's Varsity Stadium

== Births ==
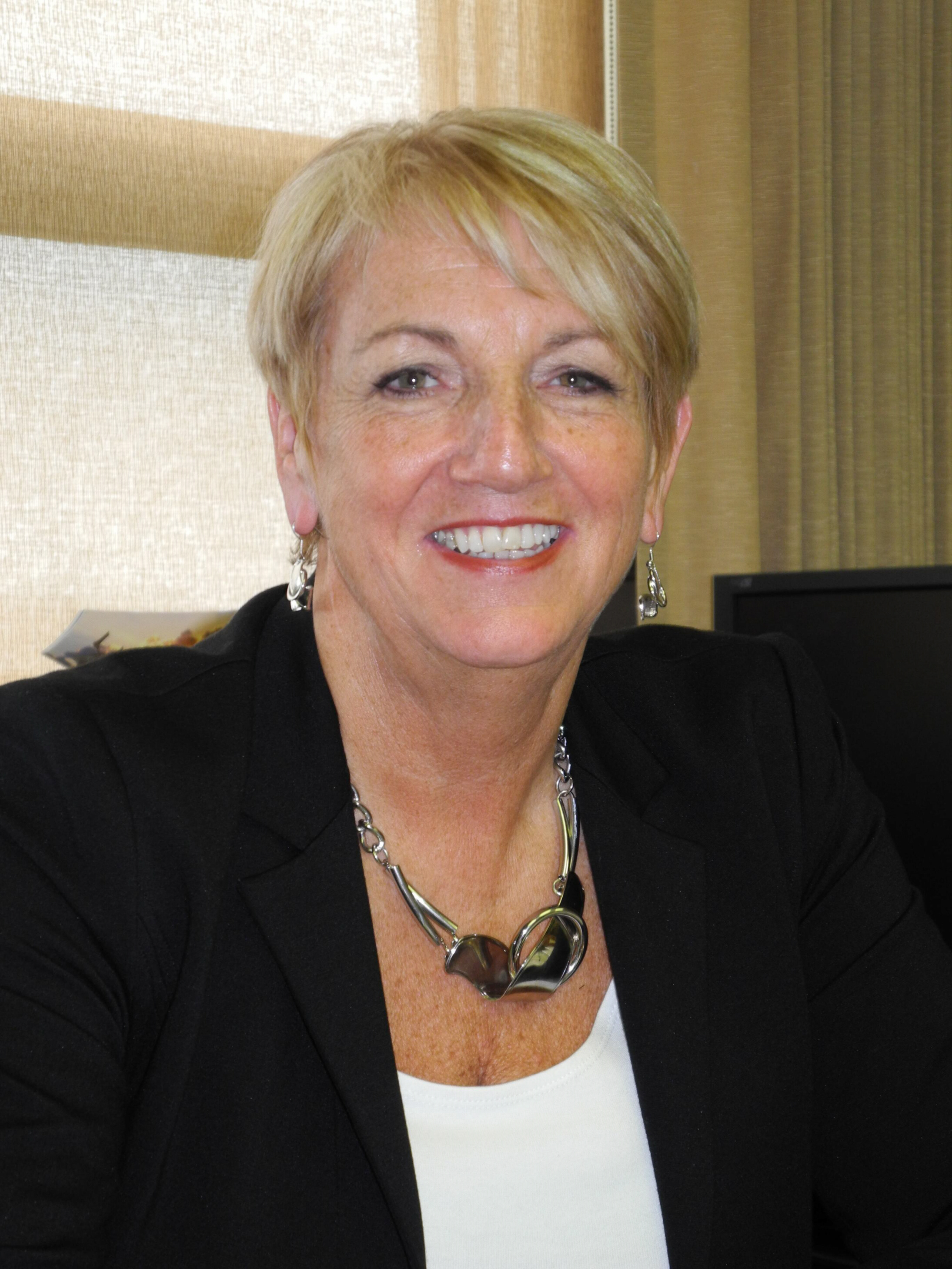
Kathy Dunderdale on May 31, 2011

=== January to June ===
- January 1 – Rosario Marchese, Italian-Canadian educator and politician
- January 19 – Michel Plante, ice hockey left winger
- February – Kathy Dunderdale, politician and 10th Premier of Newfoundland and Labrador
- February 3 – Wayne Erdman, judoka
- February 18 – Bernard Valcourt, politician and lawyer
- February 27 – Maureen McTeer, author and lawyer
- March 4 – Svend Robinson, politician, Canada's first openly homosexual elected official and prominent activist for gay rights
- May 13 – Mary Walsh, actress and comedian
- May 17 – Howard Hampton, politician
- June 1 – Ferron, folk singer-songwriter and poet
- June 6 – Jean Hamel, ice hockey player
- June 12 – Joan Phillip, politician (d. 2026)
- June 22 – Graham Greene, actor (d. 2025)
- June 29 – David Dingwall, politician, minister and civil servant

=== July to September ===
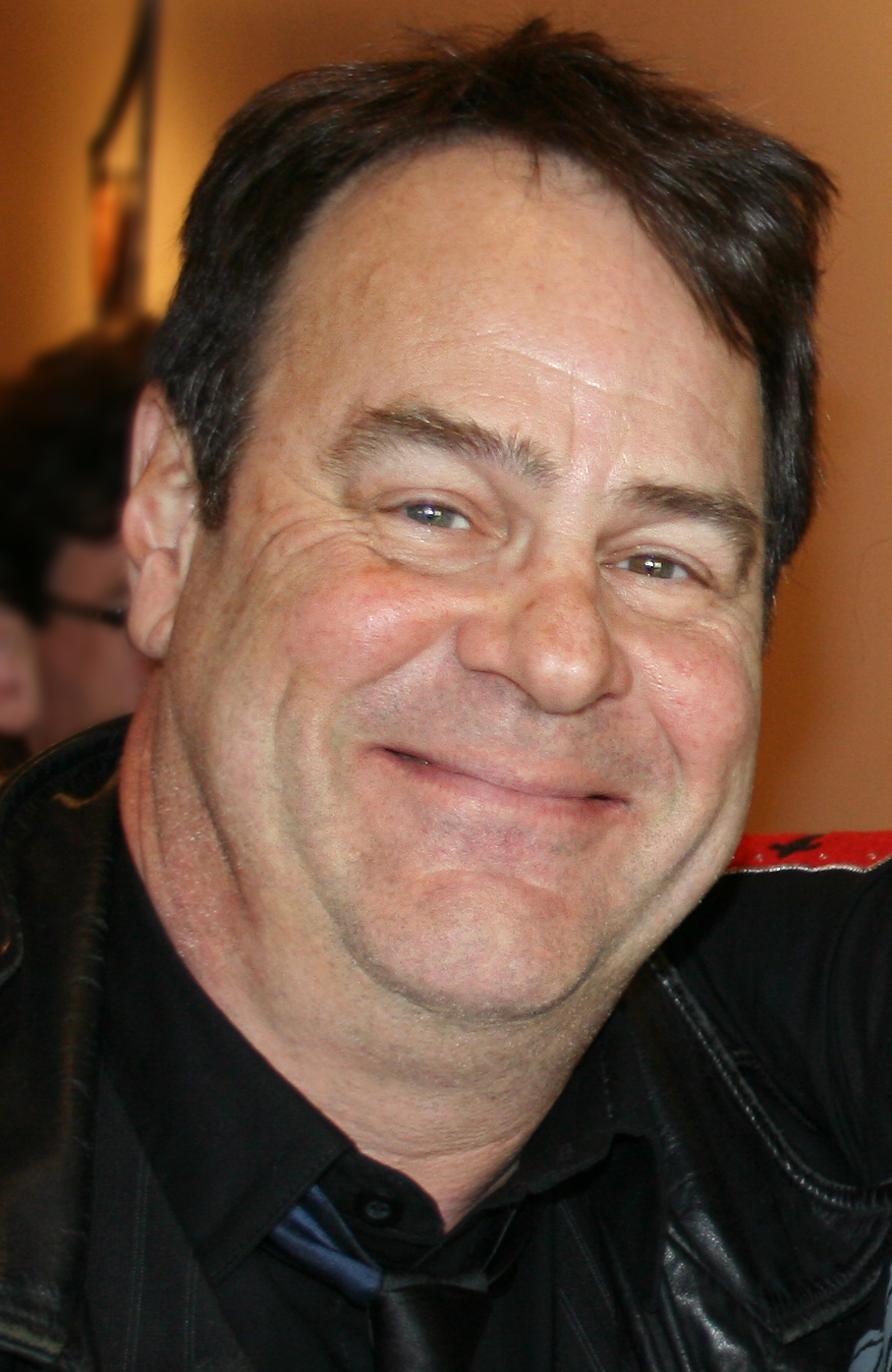
Dan Aykroyd

- July 1
  - Dan Aykroyd, comedian, actor, screenwriter and musician
  - Sam George, native rights activist (d. 2009)
  - Deborah Grey, politician
- July 3 – Rohinton Mistry, author
- July 6 – George Athans, world-champion water skier
- July 7 – David Milgaard, wrongfully convicted of murder (d. 2022)
- July 13 – Rosemary Dunsmore, actress
- July 25 – Nancy Allan, politician
- July 31 – Kent Angus, businessman (d. 2021)
- August 9 – Gary Kowalski, politician
- September 8 – Sue Barnes, politician
- September 10 – Vic Toews, politician
- September 12 – Neil Peart, drummer and author (d. 2020)

=== October to December ===
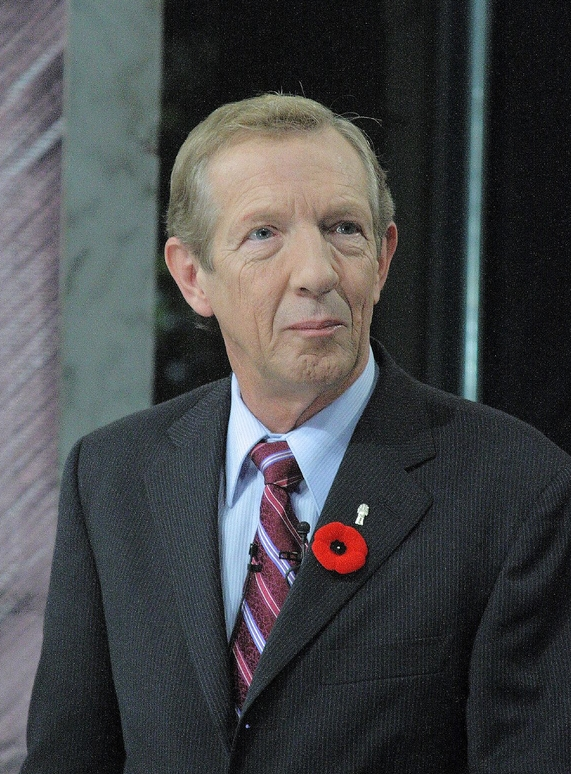
Lorne Calvert

- October 2 – Marie Deschamps, jurist and puisne justice on the Supreme Court of Canada
- October 4 – Angela Coughlan, swimmer and Olympic bronze medalist (d. 2009)
- October 22 – Peggy Baker, dancer
- November 10 – Jim Maloway, politician
- November 16 – Candas Jane Dorsey, poet and science fiction novelist
- November 27 – Sheila Copps, journalist and politician
- December 12 – Herb Dhaliwal, politician and Minister
- December 24 – Lorne Calvert, politician and 13th Premier of Saskatchewan
- December 27 – Jay Hill, politician

=== Full date unknown ===
- Di Brandt, poet and literary critic
- David Macfarlane, journalist, playwright and novelist
- Bob McLeod, politician and 12th Premier of the Northwest Territories

== Deaths ==
- February 6 – George VI, King of Canada (b. 1895)
- June 21 – Wilfrid R. "Wop" May, World War I flying ace and pioneering bush pilot (b. 1896)
- July 6 – Louis-Alexandre Taschereau, politician and 14th Premier of Quebec (b. 1867)
- August 31 – Henri Bourassa, politician and publisher (b. 1868)
- October 6 – Walter Stanley Monroe, businessman, politician and Prime Minister of Newfoundland (b. 1871)
- October 18 – Joseph-Mathias Tellier, politician (b. 1861)
- November 8 – Harold Innis, professor of political economy and author (b. 1894)

=== Full date unknown ===
- James Breakey, politician (b. 1865)

== See also ==
- 1952 in Canadian television
- List of Canadian films
