= 1965 in Canada =

- Decades: 1940s; 1950s; 1960s; 1970s; 1980s
- See also: History of Canada; Timeline of Canadian history; List of years in Canada

Events from the year 1965 in Canada.

== Incumbents ==
=== Crown ===
- Monarch – Elizabeth II

=== Federal government ===
- Governor General – Georges Vanier
- Prime Minister – Lester B. Pearson
- Chief Justice – Robert Taschereau (Quebec)
- Parliament – 26th (until September 8) then 27th (from December 9)

=== Provincial governments ===
==== Lieutenant governors ====
- Lieutenant Governor of Alberta – John Percy Page
- Lieutenant Governor of British Columbia – George Pearkes
- Lieutenant Governor of Manitoba – Errick Willis (until November 1) then Richard Spink Bowles
- Lieutenant Governor of New Brunswick – Joseph Leonard O'Brien (until June 9) then John B. McNair
- Lieutenant Governor of Newfoundland – Fabian O'Dea
- Lieutenant Governor of Nova Scotia – Henry Poole MacKeen
- Lieutenant Governor of Ontario – William Earl Rowe
- Lieutenant Governor of Prince Edward Island – Willibald Joseph MacDonald
- Lieutenant Governor of Quebec – Paul Comtois
- Lieutenant Governor of Saskatchewan – Robert Hanbidge

==== Premiers ====
- Premier of Alberta – Ernest Manning
- Premier of British Columbia – W.A.C. Bennett
- Premier of Manitoba – Dufferin Roblin
- Premier of New Brunswick – Louis Robichaud
- Premier of Newfoundland – Joey Smallwood
- Premier of Nova Scotia – Robert Stanfield
- Premier of Ontario – John Robarts
- Premier of Prince Edward Island – Walter Shaw
- Premier of Quebec – Jean Lesage
- Premier of Saskatchewan – Ross Thatcher

=== Territorial governments ===
==== Commissioners ====
- Commissioner of Yukon – Gordon Robertson Cameron
- Commissioner of Northwest Territories – Bent Gestur Sivertz

== Events ==
- January 1 – Trans-Canada Airlines is renamed Air Canada.
- January 9 – The Hope Slide, the largest landslide ever recorded in Canada, kills four.
- January 16 – The Canada-United States Automotive Agreement is signed
- January 28 – The Queen issues a royal proclamation, effective February 15, making the Maple Leaf flag the National Flag of Canada.
- February 15 – Canada adopts the maple leaf for the national flag.
- March 2 – Lucien Rivard escapes from a Montreal area jail
- March 7 – Canadian Roman Catholic churches celebrate mass in the vernacular for the first time due to the reforms of Vatican II
- March 20 – Peter Lougheed is elected leader of the Alberta Progressive Conservative Party
- April 2 – Lester Pearson gives a speech at Temple University in the United States that calls for a stop to the bombing of North Vietnam, infuriating President Lyndon Johnson
- May 16 – Cross Country Checkup debuts on radio
- June 7 – Navy, army, and air force commands are replaced by six functional commands
- July 8 – A crash of Canadian Pacific Air Lines Flight 21 in British Columbia kills 52.
- September 9 – The Fowler Report is released. It advocates creation of the Canadian Radio-television and Telecommunications Commission (CRTC)
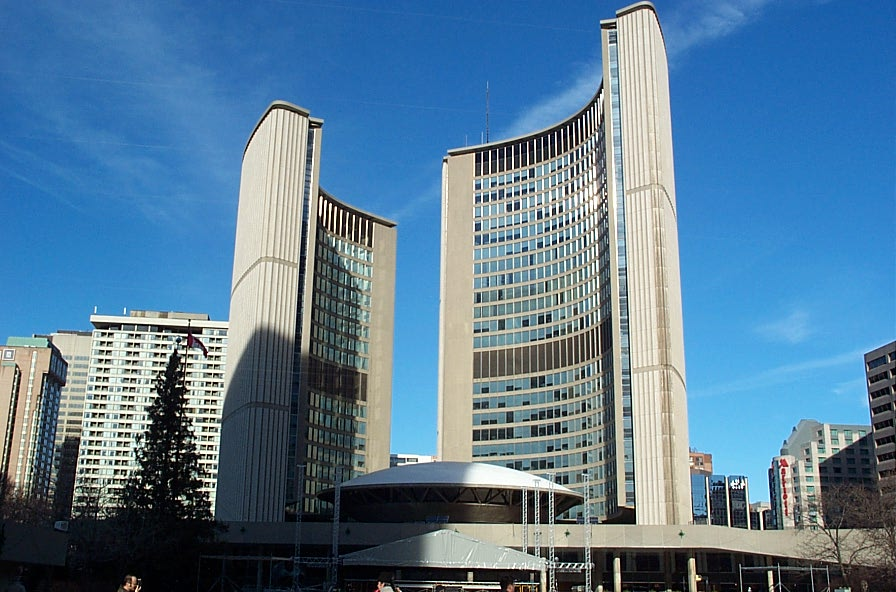
  Toronto City Hall opens
- September 13 – The new Toronto City Hall is opened.
- November 8 – Federal election: Lester Pearson's Liberals win a second consecutive minority
- November 9 – A failure at an Ontario power station causes the 1965 Blackout that stretches from Florida to Chicago and all of southern Ontario.
- November 29 – Alouette 2 is launched.

=== Full date unknown ===
- Eligibility age for pensions is lowered from 70 to 65

== Arts and literature ==
=== New books ===
- George Grant: Lament for a Nation
- John Newlove: Moving in Alone
- Robert Kroetsch: But We Are Exiles
- Farley Mowat: West Viking
- Gilles Archambault: La vie à trois
- Hubert Aquin: Prochain épisode

=== Awards ===
- Gordon R. Dickson's Soldier, Ask Not wins a Hugo Award
- See 1965 Governor General's Awards for a complete list of winners and finalists for those awards.
- Stephen Leacock Award: Gregory Clark, War Stories
- Vicky Metcalf Award: Roderick Haig-Brown

=== Music ===
- Karel Ančerl replaces Seiji Ozawa as artistic director of the Toronto Symphony Orchestra

=== Film ===
- October 13 – The Canadian Film Development Agency is formed
- Christopher Plummer stars as Captain von Trapp in The Sound of Music
- William Shatner stars in Incubus

== Sport ==
- March 13 – The Manitoba Bisons win their first University Cup by defeating the St. Dunstan's Saints 9 to 2. The final game was played at the Winnipeg Arena
- May 1 – The Montreal Canadiens win their thirteenth Stanley Cup by defeating the Chicago Black Hawks 4 games to 3. The deciding Game 7 was played at the Montreal Forum. Trois-Rivières, Quebec's Jean Beliveau is awarded the First Conn Smythe Trophy as the 1965 Playoffs MVP
- September 10 – Future Baseball Hall of Famer Ferguson Jenkins plays his first major league game for the Philadelphia Phillies in Connie Mack Stadium
- May 11 – The Ontario Hockey Association's Niagara Falls Flyers win their first Memorial Cup by defeating the Central Alberta Hockey League's Edmonton Oil Kings 4 games to 0. All games were played at Edmonton Gardens
- November 20 – The Toronto Varsity Blues defeat the Alberta Golden Bears 14–7 in the 1st Vanier Cup played at Varsity Stadium in Toronto
- November 27 – The Hamilton Tiger-Cats win their 4th Grey Cup by defeating the Winnipeg Blue Bombers 22–16 in the 53rd Grey Cup in Toronto's CNE Stadium.

== Births ==
=== January to March ===
- January 8
  - Wendy Fuller, diver
  - Eric Wohlberg, racing cyclist
- January 21 – Brian Bradley, ice hockey player
- January 23 – Tim Berrett, race walker
- January 27 – Ross MacDonald, sailor and Olympic silver medallist

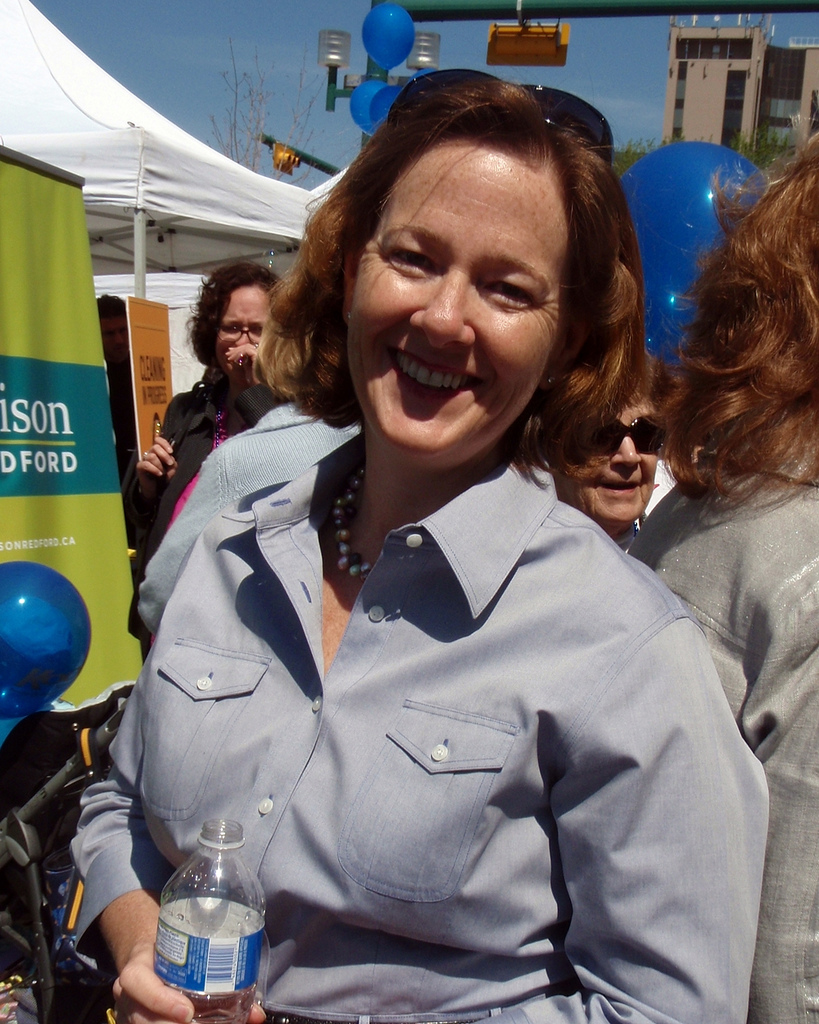
Alison Redford

- January 28
  - Stéphane Bergeron, politician
  - Lynda Boyd, actress
  - Tom Ponting, swimmer and double Olympic silver medallist
- January 31 – Ofra Harnoy, cellist
- March 1 – Stewart Elliott, jockey
- March 7 - Alison Redford, lawyer and politician, 14th premier of Alberta
- March 15 – Marcel Gery, swimmer and Olympic bronze medallist
- March 16 – Mark Carney, banker and politician, 24th prime minister of Canada
- March 23 – Daren Puppa, ice hockey player

=== April to June ===
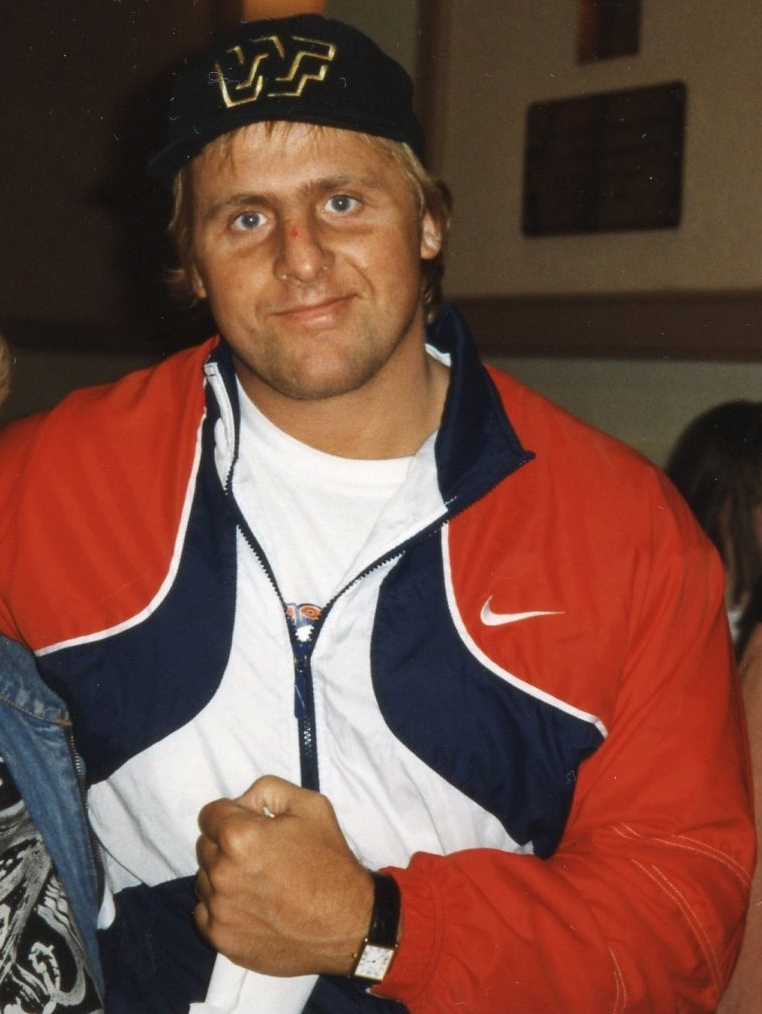
Owen Hart

- April 11 – Chris Pridham, tennis player
- April 21 – Ed Belfour, ice hockey player
- April 22 – Peter Zezel, ice hockey player (d. 2009)
- May 7 – Owen Hart, wrestler (d. 1999)
- May 9 – Steve Yzerman, ice hockey player
- May 10 – Linda Evangelista, supermodel
- May 19 – James Bezan, politician
- June 19 – Gary Vandermeulen, swimmer
- June 25 – Julie Daigneault, swimmer
- June 26 – Gaye Porteous, field hockey player

=== July to September ===
- July 11 – Michael Wayne McGray, serial killer
- July 17 – Ken Evraire, television journalist, host and former professional footballer
- July 26 – Michael Rascher, rower and Olympic gold medallist

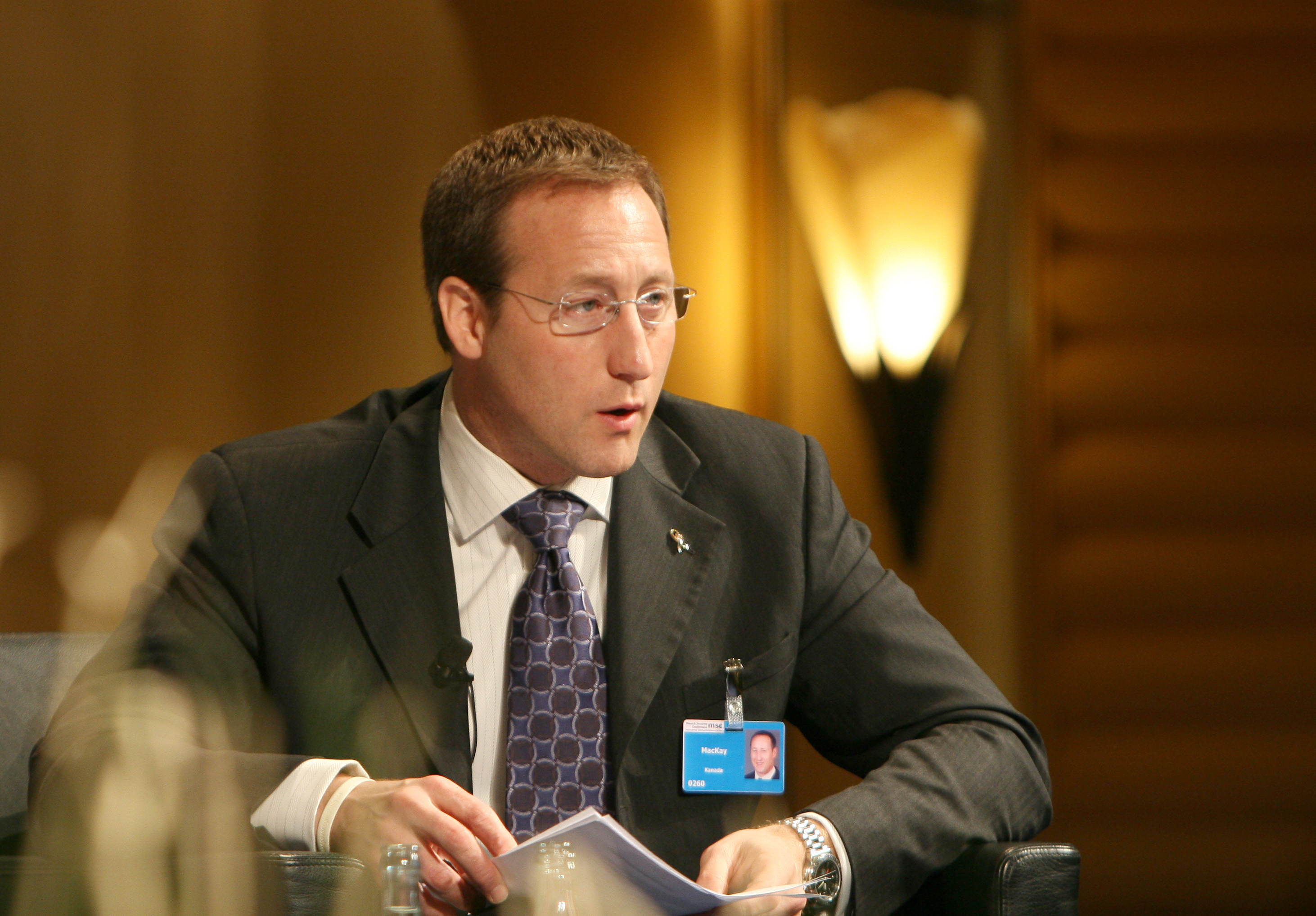
Peter MacKay attending the 45th Munich Security Conference

- August 4 – James Tupper, actor
- August 11 – Marc Bergevin, ice hockey player
- August 22
  - Patricia Hy-Boulais, tennis player
  - David Reimer, Canadian man, born male but reassigned female and raised as a girl after a botched circumcision
- August 28 – Shania Twain, singer-songwriter
- September 8 – Mark Andrews, swimmer
- September 9 - Eric Tunney, comedian (Kids in the Hall: Brain Candy) (d. 2010)

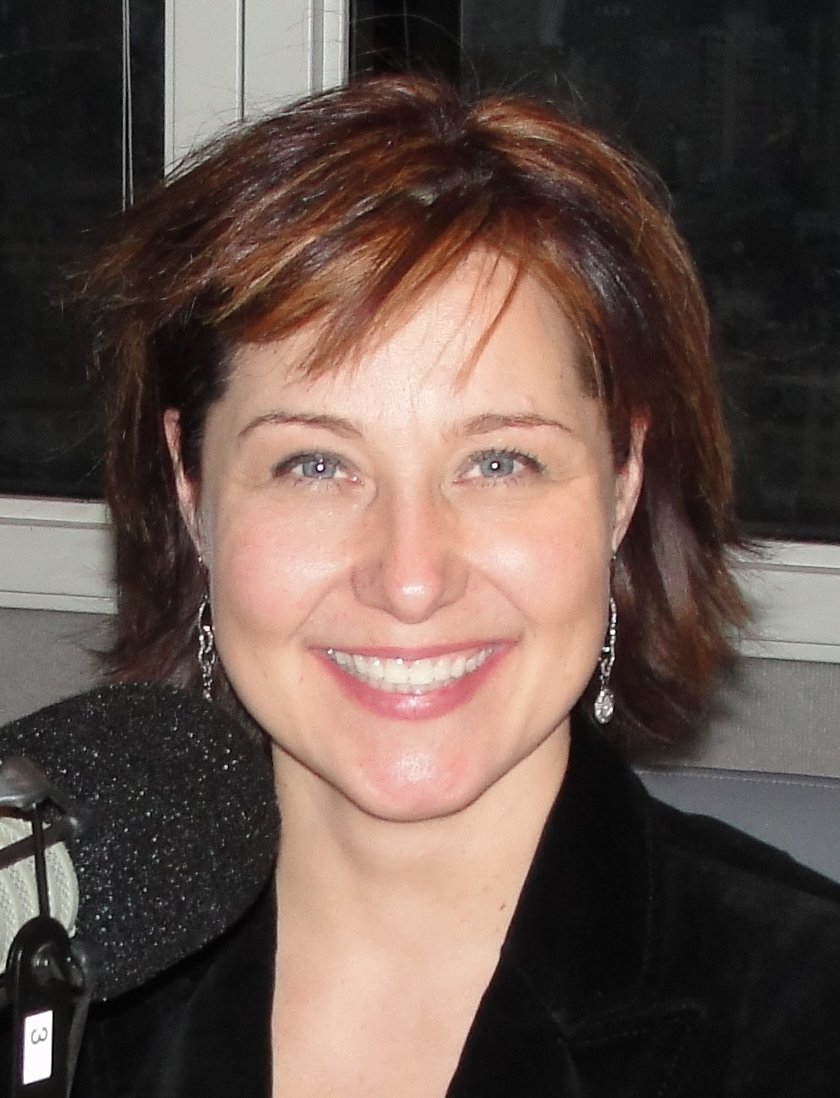
Christy Clark

- September 27
  - Bernard Lord, politician and 30th Premier of New Brunswick
  - Peter MacKay, lawyer, politician and Minister

=== October to December ===
- October 1 – Cliff Ronning, ice hockey player
- October 5
  - Mario Lemieux, ice hockey player
  - Patrick Roy, ice hockey player
- October 23 – David Bédard, diver

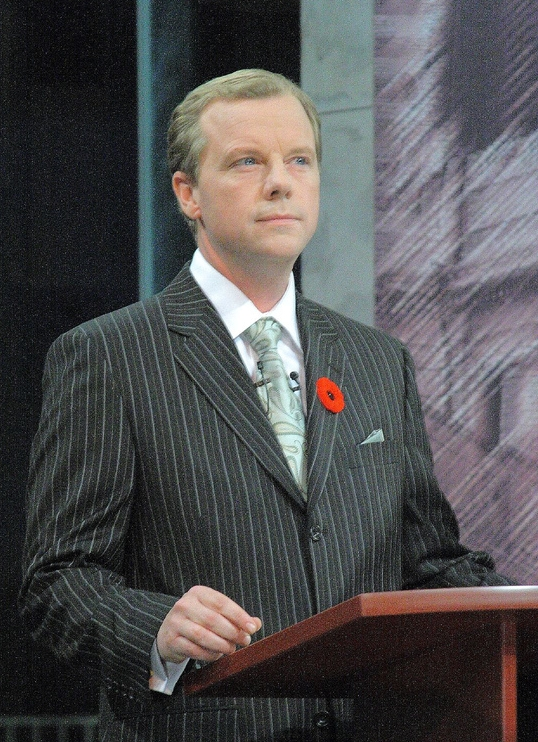
Brad Wall on October 30, 2007

- October 29 – Christy Clark, politician and 35th premier of British Columbia
- November 5 – Andrew Crosby, rower and Olympic gold medallist
- November 13 - Rick Roberts, actor
- November 20 – John Graham, track and field athlete
- November 21 – Jon Kelly, swimmer
- November 24 – Brad Wall, politician and 14th premier of Saskatchewan
- November 27 – Kathleen Heddle, rower and triple Olympic gold medallist (d. 2021)
- December 1 – Jamie Pagendam, boxer
- December 10 – Jennifer Wyatt, golfer
- December 18 – Brian Walton, road and track cyclist and coach
- December 29 - Manon Perreault, politician

=== Full date unknown ===
- Emanuel Jaques, murder victim (d. 1977)

== Deaths ==
- January 17 – Austin Claude Taylor, politician (b.1893)
- April 1 – Harry Crerar, General (b.1888)
- June 7 – John Stewart McDiarmid, politician and Lieutenant-Governor of Manitoba (b.1882)
- July 19 - Franklin D. McDowell, author
- August 23 – George Black, politician (b.1873)
- August 28 – Jacob Penner, politician (b.1880)
- September 2 — Pat Harrington Sr., actor (b. 1901)
- September 10 – S. E. Rogers, politician (b.1888)
- September 20 - Madge Macbeth, author (b.1878 in the United States)
- October 8 - Thomas B. Costain, historian (b.1885)
- November 25 - Gwethalyn Graham, author (b.1913)

== See also ==
- 1965 in Canadian television
- List of Canadian films
