= 1963 in Canada =

- Decades: 1940s; 1950s; 1960s; 1970s; 1980s
- See also: History of Canada; Timeline of Canadian history; List of years in Canada

q

Events from the year 1963 in Canada.

== Incumbents ==
=== Crown ===
- Monarch – Elizabeth II

=== Federal government ===
- Governor General – Georges Vanier
- Prime Minister – John Diefenbaker (until April 22) then Lester B. Pearson
- Chief Justice – Patrick Kerwin (Ontario) (until 2 February) then Robert Taschereau (Quebec)
- Parliament – 25th (until 6 February) then 26th (from 16 May)

=== Provincial governments ===
==== Lieutenant governors ====
- Lieutenant Governor of Alberta – John Percy Page
- Lieutenant Governor of British Columbia – George Pearkes
- Lieutenant Governor of Manitoba – Errick Willis
- Lieutenant Governor of New Brunswick – Joseph Leonard O'Brien
- Lieutenant Governor of Newfoundland – Campbell Leonard Macpherson (until March 1) then Fabian O'Dea
- Lieutenant Governor of Nova Scotia – Edward Chester Plow (until March 1) then Henry Poole MacKeen
- Lieutenant Governor of Ontario – John Keiller MacKay (until May 1) then William Earl Rowe
- Lieutenant Governor of Prince Edward Island – Frederick Walter Hyndman (until August 1) then Willibald Joseph MacDonald
- Lieutenant Governor of Quebec – Paul Comtois
- Lieutenant Governor of Saskatchewan – Frank Lindsay Bastedo (until March 1) then Robert Hanbidge

==== Premiers ====
- Premier of Alberta – Ernest Manning
- Premier of British Columbia – W.A.C. Bennett
- Premier of Manitoba – Dufferin Roblin
- Premier of New Brunswick – Louis Robichaud
- Premier of Newfoundland – Joey Smallwood
- Premier of Nova Scotia – Robert Stanfield
- Premier of Ontario – John Robarts
- Premier of Prince Edward Island – Walter Shaw
- Premier of Quebec – Jean Lesage
- Premier of Saskatchewan – Woodrow Lloyd

=== Territorial governments ===
==== Commissioners ====
- Commissioner of Yukon – Gordon Robertson Cameron
- Commissioner of Northwest Territories – Robert Gordon Robertson (until July 12) then Bent Gestur Sivertz

== Events ==
- February 4: Defence Minister Douglas Harkness resigns after Prime Minister Diefenbaker refuses to accept nuclear weapons from the United States
- February 5: The Diefenbaker government collapses over the Bomarc Missile Crisis and an election is called
- March 1: Simon Fraser University is founded
- April 8: Federal election: Lester Pearson's Liberals win a minority, defeating John Diefenbaker's PCs
- April 9: Canadian Recording Industry Association is established
- April 20: The Front de libération du Québec sets off its first bombs in Quebec
- April 22: Lester Pearson becomes Prime Minister, replacing John Diefenbaker
- May 27: The Northern Alberta Institute of Technology opens
- June 17: 1963 Alberta general election: Ernest Manning's Alberta Social Credit Party wins an eighth consecutive majority
- July 22: The Royal Commission on Bilingualism and Biculturalism is announced
- August 1: An explosion kills 8 people, including 5 children, in the town of Hanmer near Sudbury, Ontario
- September 21: Place des Arts opens in Montreal
- September 25: 1963 Ontario general election: John Robarts's PCs win a sixth consecutive majority
- November 29: 118 are killed in the Trans-Canada Air Lines Flight 831 crash near Sainte-Thérèse, Quebec
- December 23: plans to build the National Arts Centre are approved

== Arts and literature ==
=== New Works ===
- W.L. Morton: The Kingdom of Canada
- Milton Acorn: Jawbreakers
- Leonard Cohen: The Favorite Game
- Farley Mowat: Never Cry Wolf

=== Awards ===
- See 1963 Governor General's Awards for a complete list of winners and finalists for those awards.
- Stephen Leacock Award: Donald Jack, Three Cheers for Me
- Vicky Metcalf Award: Kerry Wood

== Sport ==
- March 16 – The McMaster Marlins win the first University Cup by defeating the UBC Thunderbirds 3 to 2 at the Kingston Memorial Centre
- April 18 – The Toronto Maple Leafs win their 11th Stanley Cup by defeating the Detroit Red Wings. The deciding Game 5 is played at Maple Leaf Gardens in Toronto
- April 22 – Winnipeg awarded the 1967 Pan Am Games
- May 11 – The Central Alberta Hockey League's Edmonton Oil Kings win their First Memorial Cup by defeating Ontario Hockey Association's Niagara Falls Flyers 4 games to 2. All games were played at Edmonton Gardens.
- November 30 – The Hamilton Tiger-Cats win their third Grey Cup by defeating the BC Lions 21–10 in the 51st Grey Cup played Empire Stadium in Vancouver.

== Births ==
=== January to March ===
- January 1 – Cheryl Dick, netball player
- January 9 – Larry Cain, sprint canoer and Olympic gold medallist
- January 12 – Ken Fitzpatrick, swimmer
- January 19 – Steve Peters, politician and Minister
- January 25 – Paul Dewar, educator and politician (d. 2019)
- February 12 – Ron Schuler, politician
- February 21 – Lori Fung, rhythmic gymnast
- March 1 – Ron Francis, ice hockey player and coach
- March 17 – Lawrence Ytzhak Braithwaite, novelist, spoken word artist, dub poet, essayist and musician (d. 2008)
- March 26 – Roch Voisine, singer-songwriter, actor and radio and television host
- March 28 – Sharon Hambrook, synchronized swimmer
- March 30
  - Wayne Gordon, boxer
  - Carol Klimpel, swimmer

=== April to June ===
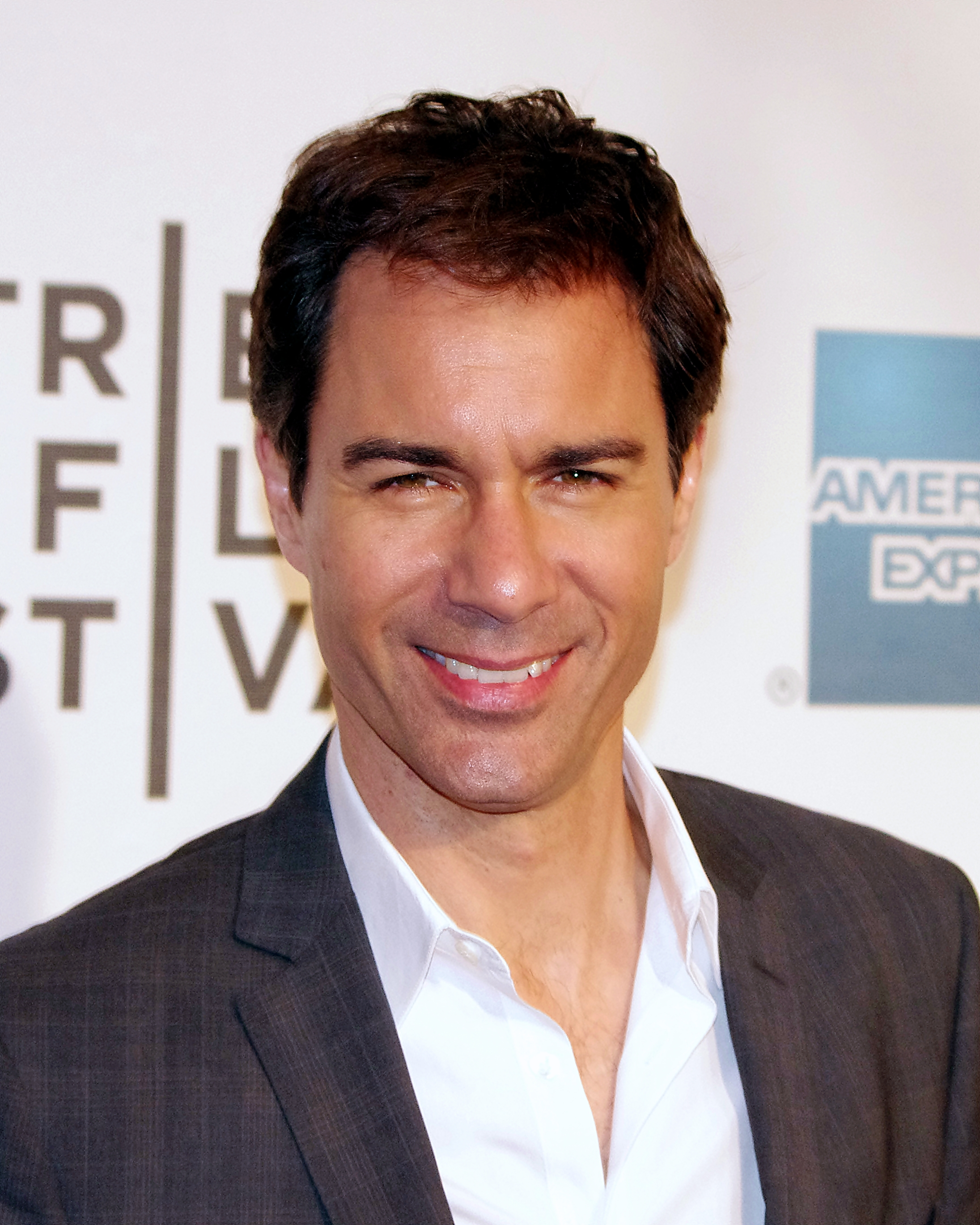
Eric McCormack in April 2012

- April 4
  - Vince Ditrich, rock musician
  - Dale Hawerchuk, ice hockey player
  - Jim Wilson, politician
- April 14 – John Kalbhenn, boxer
- April 17 – Penny & Vicky Vilagos, synchronized swimmers
- April 18 – Eric McCormack, actor, musician, writer and producer
- April 27 – Joe Peschisolido, politician and businessman
- April 27 – Cali Timmins, actress

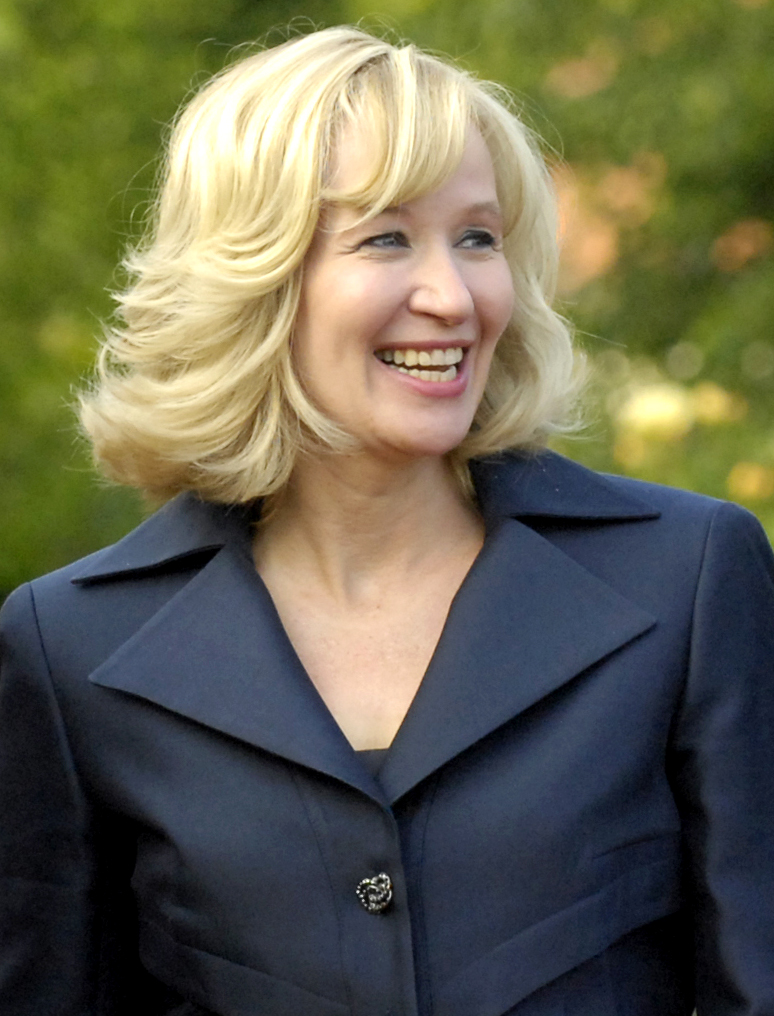
Harper at the G8 summit, June 6, 2007

- April 28 – Lloyd Eisler, pair skater
- May 5
  - James LaBrie, vocalist (Dream Theater)
  - Susan Whelan, politician and minister
- May 9 – Joe Cirella, ice hockey player and coach
- May 11 – Roark Critchlow, actor
- May 17 – Michelle Conn, field hockey player
- May 18 – Nigel S. Wright, businessman and chief of staff to the prime minister (d. 2025)
- May 25 – Mike Myers, actor, comedian, screenwriter and film producer
- May 26 – Richard Crouse, film critic
- June – Laureen Harper, wife of Prime Minister Stephen Harper
- June 4 – Carey Nelson, long-distance runner
- June 6 – Bernard Drainville, Canadian journalist and politician
- June 17 – Sandra Greaves, judoka
- June 23 – Laureen Harper, wife of Prime Minister of Canada Stephen Harper
- June 24 – Barbara Underhill, pairs figure skater and World Champion
- June 25 – Doug Gilmour, ice hockey player and coach
- June 25 – Yann Martel, author

=== July to September ===
- July 11 – Al MacInnis, ice hockey player
- July 11 – Sandra Schmirler, curler, Olympic gold medallist and World Champion (d. 2000)
- July 12 – Andy Savoy, politician and engineer
- July 28 – Gregory Henriquez, architect
- July 30 – Albert Schultz, actor and director
- August 2 – Russell Smith, novelist and newspaper columnist
- August 8 – Stephen Walkom, ice hockey official and executive
- September 2 – Gerard Gallant, ice hockey player and coach
- September 7 – Karen Dianne Baldwin, Miss Universe 1982
- September 9 – Kathryn Johnson, field hockey player
- September 25 – Karin Larsen, synchronized swimmer and broadcaster
- September 29 – Dave Andreychuk, ice hockey player

=== October to December ===
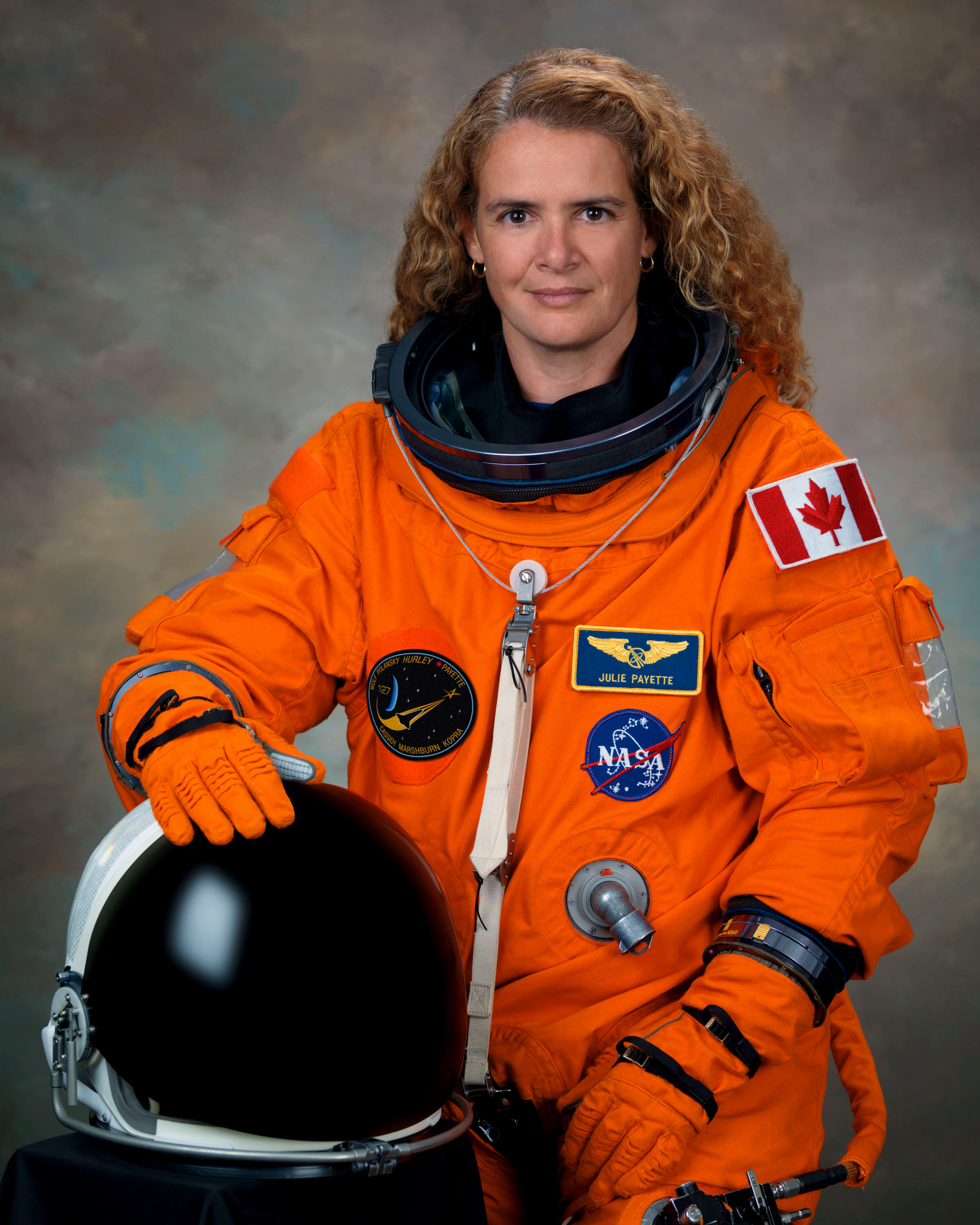
Julie Payette

- October 20 – Julie Payette, astronaut
- November 19 – Bill Dunlop, boxer
- November 22 – Benoît Sauvageau, politician (d. 2006)
- November 23 – Troy Hurtubise, inventor and conservationist (d. 2018)
- November 25 – Holly Cole, jazz singer
- December 4 – Robert Dawson, wrestler
- December 9 – Dave Hilton, Jr., boxer
- December 29 – Liisa Savijarvi, alpine skier
- December 30 – Michelle Douglas, human rights activist

== Deaths ==
- January 2 – Jack Carson, actor (b. 1910)
- March 27 – Gaspard Fauteux, politician, Speaker of the House of Commons of Canada and Lieutenant-Governor of Quebec (b. 1898)
- May 12 – Robert Kerr, sprinter and Olympic gold medallist (b.1882)
- June 23 – Herbert Alexander Bruce, surgeon and 15th Lieutenant Governor of Ontario (b.1868)
- August 19 – Kathleen Parlow, violinist (b.1890)
- September 8 – Leslie Gordon Bell, politician and lawyer (b. 1889)
- October 8 – Grace Darmond, Canadian-born actress (b. 1893)

=== Full date unknown ===
- Murdoch Mackay, politician (b.1884)

== See also ==
- 1963 in Canadian television
- List of Canadian films
