= 1820 in Canada =

- Decades: 1800s; 1810s; 1820s; 1830s; 1840s
- See also: History of Canada; Timeline of Canadian history; List of years in Canada

Events from the year 1820 in Canada.

== Incumbents ==
- Monarch: George III (until January 29), then George IV

=== Federal government ===
- Parliament of Lower Canada: 9th (until February 9) then 10th (April 11 – April 24) then 11th (starting December 14)
- Parliament of Upper Canada: 7th (until March 7)

=== Governors ===
- Governor of the Canadas: Robert Milnes
- Governor of New Brunswick: George Stracey Smyth
- Governor of Nova Scotia: John Coape Sherbrooke
- Commodore-Governor of Newfoundland: Richard Goodwin Keats
- Governor of Prince Edward Island: Charles Douglass Smith

== Events ==
- June 18 – The Governor, Earl of Dalhousie, arrives.

=== Full date unknown ===
- Creation of the municipality of Prescott and Russell in Upper Canada (today Ontario).
- William Lyon Mackenzie emigrates to Canada.

== Births ==
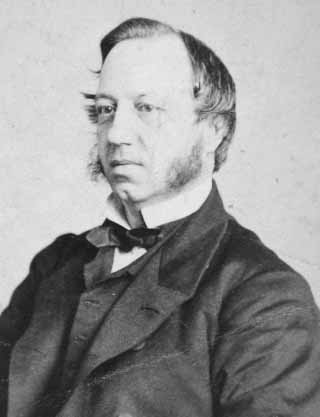
Pierre-Joseph-Olivier Chauveau in 1863

- January 17 – Hiram Blanchard, Premier of Nova Scotia (d.1874)
- February 17 – Elzéar-Alexandre Taschereau, Archbishop of Quebec (d.1898)
- May 12 – Luc Letellier de St-Just, politician and 3rd Lieutenant Governor of Quebec (d. 1881)
- May 19 - Stephen Richards, politician, Ontario MPP for Niagara and Provincial Secretary (d. 1894)
- May 30 – Pierre-Joseph-Olivier Chauveau, Premier of Quebec (d.1890)

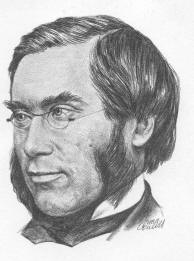
Oliver Mowat

- July 2 – Oliver Mowat, politician, 3rd Premier of Ontario and 8th Lieutenant Governor of Ontario (d.1903)
- August 2 – John Rose, politician (d.1888)
- August 6 – Donald Alexander Smith, politician (d.1914)
- August 16 – Andrew Rainsford Wetmore, Premier of New Brunswick (d. 1892)
- August 27 – Charles-René-Léonidas d'Irumberry de Salaberry, militia officer (d.1882)
- October 13 – John William Dawson, geologist and university administrator (d.1899)
- December 24 – Joseph-Charles Taché, a Canadian noted for his contributions to many aspects of the fabric of Canada (d.1894)

== Deaths ==
- March 12 – Sir Alexander Mackenzie, explorer (b.1764)
- April 8 – Thomas Douglas, 5th Earl of Selkirk, colonizer and author (b.1771)
- July 11 – Frederick Traugott Pursh, botanist (b.1774)
