= 1951 in Canada =

- Decades: 1930s; 1940s; 1950s; 1960s; 1970s
- See also: History of Canada; Timeline of Canadian history; List of years in Canada

Events from the year 1951 in Canada.

== Incumbents ==
=== Crown ===
- Monarch – George VI

=== Federal government ===
- Governor General – the Viscount Alexander of Tunis
- Prime Minister – Louis St. Laurent
- Chief Justice – Thibaudeau Rinfret (Quebec)
- Parliament – 21st

=== Provincial governments ===
==== Lieutenant governors ====
- Lieutenant Governor of Alberta – John J. Bowlen
- Lieutenant Governor of British Columbia – Clarence Wallace
- Lieutenant Governor of Manitoba – Roland Fairbairn McWilliams
- Lieutenant Governor of New Brunswick – David Laurence MacLaren
- Lieutenant Governor of Newfoundland – Leonard Outerbridge
- Lieutenant Governor of Nova Scotia – John Alexander Douglas McCurdy
- Lieutenant Governor of Ontario – Ray Lawson
- Lieutenant Governor of Prince Edward Island – Thomas William Lemuel Prowse
- Lieutenant Governor of Quebec – Gaspard Fauteux
- Lieutenant Governor of Saskatchewan – John Michael Uhrich (until June 15) then William John Patterson (from June 25)

==== Premiers ====
- Premier of Alberta – Ernest Manning
- Premier of British Columbia – Byron Johnson
- Premier of Manitoba – Douglas Campbell
- Premier of New Brunswick – John McNair
- Premier of Newfoundland – Joey Smallwood
- Premier of Nova Scotia – Angus Macdonald
- Premier of Ontario – Leslie Frost
- Premier of Prince Edward Island – J. Walter Jones
- Premier of Quebec – Maurice Duplessis
- Premier of Saskatchewan – Tommy Douglas

=== Territorial governments ===
==== Commissioners ====
- Commissioner of Yukon – Andrew Harold Gibson (until October 15) then Frederick Fraser
- Commissioner of Northwest Territories – Hugh Andrew Young

== Events ==
- April 22–25 – Korean War: In the Battle of Kapyong, the Canadians hold off the Chinese.
- June 1 – The Massey Report into Canadian culture is released
- July 10 – A formal peace agreement between Canada and Germany is signed
- September 30 - Charlotte Whitton becomes mayor of Ottawa and Canada's first woman mayor of a major city.
- October 27:
  - The cobalt bomb cancer therapy is first tested in London, Ontario
  - The Duke of Edinburgh, and The Princess Elizabeth, Duchess of Edinburgh (later Queen Elizabeth II), attend an Edmonton Eskimos home game. In the western semi-final, Edmonton beat Winnipeg 4–1
- November 22 – 1951 Ontario general election: Leslie Frost's PCs win a third consecutive majority
- December 12 – The St. Lawrence Seaway Authority is established.

=== Full date unknown ===
- Canada's immigration rate rises. Population is 14,009,429.
- The Indian Act of Canada is revised to limit coverage of Aboriginal people, excluding Aboriginal women who married non-Aboriginal men.
- Louis St. Laurent moves into 24 Sussex Drive, the new official residence of the Prime Minister
- Labatt Blue is introduced
- The Wartime Prices and Trade Board is abolished.
- Thérèse Casgrain, the first woman to lead a provincial political party in Canada, becomes leader of the Quebec CCF.

== Arts and literature ==
- November 12 – The National Ballet of Canada gives its first performance in Eaton Auditorium, Toronto.

=== New books ===
- Morley Callaghan – The Loved and the Lost
- Harold Innis – The Bias of Communication

=== Awards ===
- See 1951 Governor General's Awards for a complete list of winners and finalists for those awards.
- Stephen Leacock Award: Eric Nicol, The Roving I

== Sport ==
- April 21 - The Toronto Maple Leafs win their ninth Stanley Cup by defeating the Montreal Canadiens 4 games to 1. The deciding Game 5 was played at Maple Leaf Gardens in Toronto
- May 8 - The Ontario Hockey Association's Barrie Flyers win their first Memorial Cup by defeating the Manitoba Junior Hockey League's Winnipeg Monarchs 4 game to 0. All games were played at Shea's Amphitheatre in Winnipeg
- November 24 - The Ottawa Rough Riders win their fourth Grey Cup by defeating the Saskatchewan Roughriders 21 to 14 in the 39th Grey Cup played at Varsity Stadium in Toronto

== Births ==
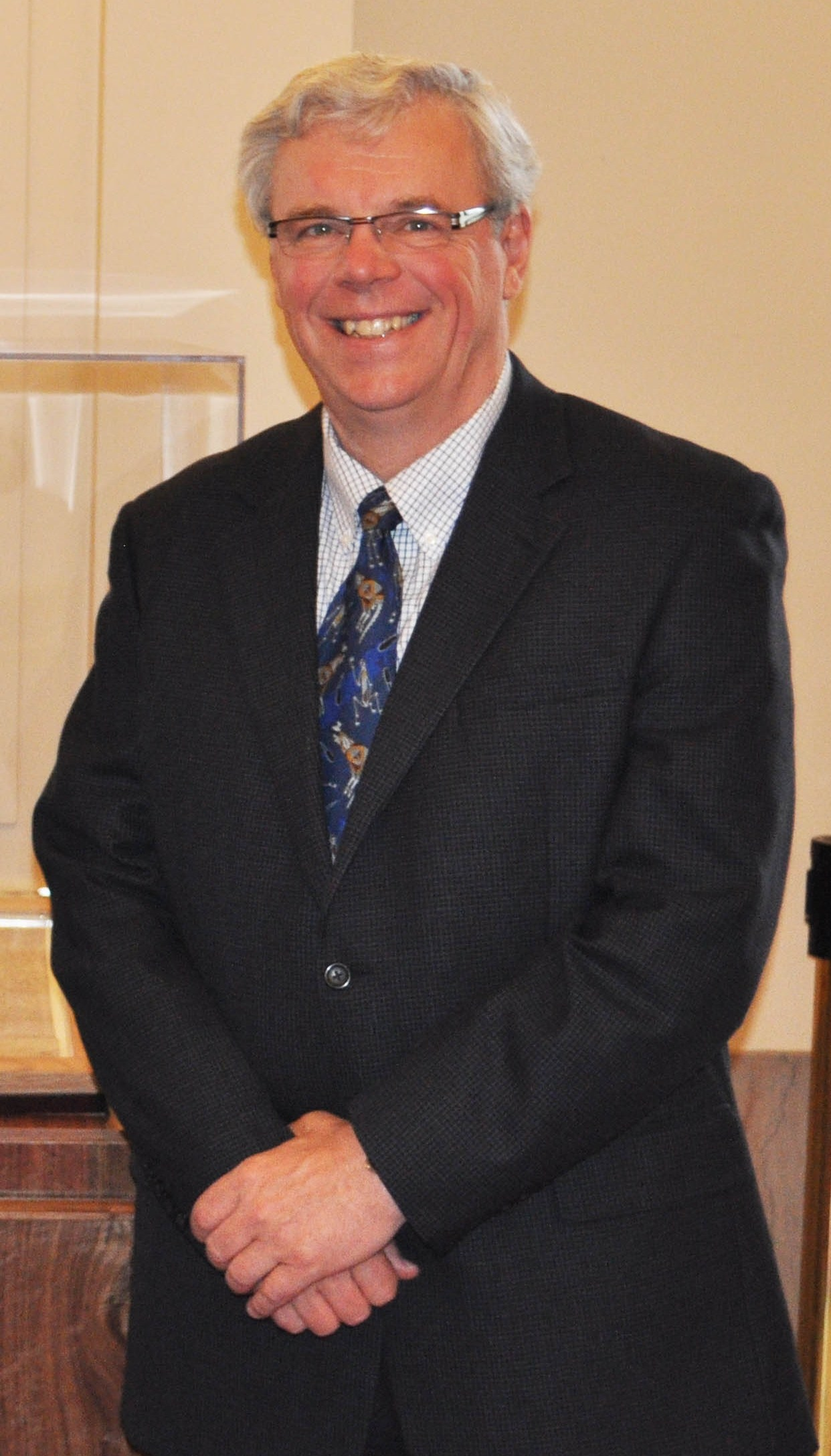
Greg Selinger in 2010

=== January to March ===
- January 3 – Claude Bachand, politician
- January 17 – Carol Marguerite Anderson, choreographer
- January 21 – Yvon Dumont, politician
- January 25 - Bob McDonald, science journalist
- February 16 – Greg Selinger, 21st premier of Manitoba
- February 22 – Elaine Tanner, swimmer
- March 12 – Susan Musgrave, poet and children's writer
- March 16 – Kate Nelligan, actress
- March 21 – Lesley Choyce, novelist, poet and children's writer
- March 25 – Ethel Blondin-Andrew, politician
- March 28 – Karen Kain, ballet dancer
- March 31 – Lawrence D. O'Brien, politician (d. 2004)

=== April to June ===
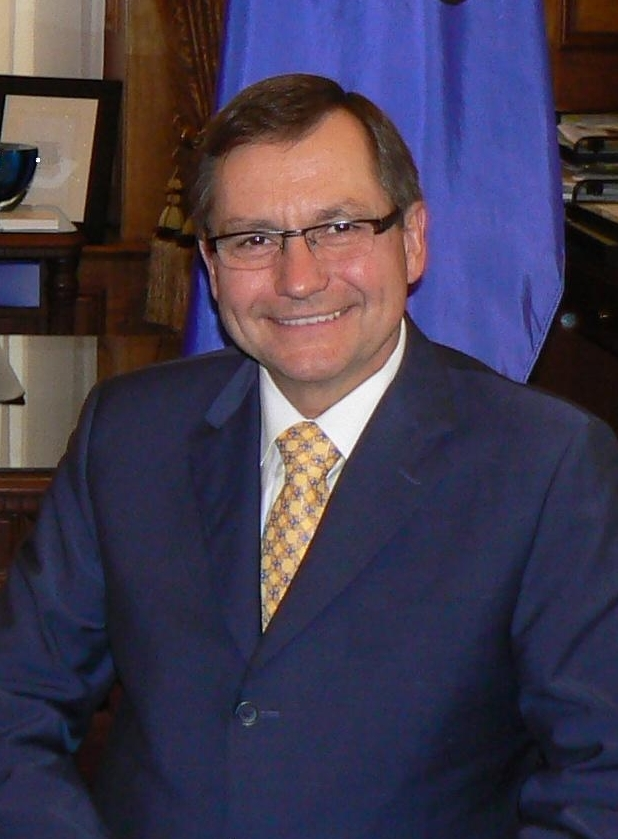
Ed Stelmach in 2009

- April 5
  - Joe Bowen, hockey broadcaster
  - Guy Vanderhaeghe, author
- April 15 – Paul Snider, killer of Dorothy Stratten (d. 1980)
- April 18 – Pierre Pettigrew, politician
- May 2 – Andrew Barron, ice speed skater
- May 3 – Dianne Whalen, MHA for Conception Bay East – Bell Island (2003–2010) (d. 2010)
- May 7 – Janina Fialkowska, pianist
- May 9 – Christopher Dewdney, poet, author and professor
- May 11
  - Chuck McMann, football player and coach (d. 2021)
  - Ed Stelmach, farmer, 13th premier of Alberta
- May 20 – Christie Blatchford, newspaper columnist, journalist and broadcaster (d. 2020)
- June 2
  - Larry Robinson, ice hockey player and coach
  - Frank C. Turner, actor
- June 7 – Terry O'Reilly, ice hockey player and coach
- June 19 – Bill Blaikie, politician (d. 2022)

=== July to September ===
- July 2 – Elisabeth Brooks, actress (d. 1997)
- July 4 – Beverly Boys, diver
- July 5 – Penny Werthner, track and field athlete
- July 20 – Paulette Bourgeois, children's writer
- July 26 – Rick Martin, ice hockey player (d. 2011)
- July 27 – Shawn Murphy, politician
- August 3 – Marcel Dionne, ice hockey player
- August 10 – Judy Wasylycia-Leis, politician
- August 17 – Robert Joy, actor
- September 9 – Jerry Doucette, guitarist and singer-songwriter (d. 2022)
- September 14 – Elizabeth Carruthers, diver
- September 19 – Daniel Lanois, record producer, guitarist and singer-songwriter
- September 20 – Guy Lafleur, ice hockey player (d. 2022)
- September 28 – Rick Gibson, artist

=== October to December ===
- October 8 – Bruce McArthur, serial killer
- October 9 – Joe Tascona, lawyer and politician
- October 11 – Jim Carr, politician (d. 2022)
- October 16 – Brenda Eisler, long jumper
- October 26 – Willie P. Bennett, folk music singer-songwriter (d. 2008)
- October 27 – Roger Fortin, boxer
- October 29
  - Camille Huard, boxer
  - Kelly Sutherland, rodeo competitor
- October 31 – Doug Bennett, singer, musician and music video director (d. 2004)
- November 10 – Marlene Jennings, politician
- November 13 – Robert Hilles, poet and novelist
- December 6 – Tomson Highway, playwright, novelist and children's author
- December 7 - Richard Darbois, actor
- December 22 – Charles de Lint, fantasy author and Celtic folk musician

=== Full date unknown ===
- Robert Priest, poet and children's author

== Deaths ==
=== January to June ===
- January 1 – Frank Scott Hogg, astrophysicist (b. 1904)
- January 3 – Richard Langton Baker, politician (b. 1870)
- January 16 – Seymour Farmer, politician (b. 1878)
- February 7 – Edna Diefenbaker, first wife of Prime Minister John Diefenbaker (b. 1899)
- February 27 – Leland Payson Bancroft, politician (b. 1880)
- April 14 – Al Christie, film director, producer and screenwriter (b. 1881)

=== July to December ===
- August 26 – Bill Barilko, ice hockey player (b. 1927)
- September 1 – Nellie McClung, feminist, politician and social activist (b. 1873)
- September 14 – James Langstaff Bowman, politician and Speaker of the House of Commons of Canada (b. 1879)
- September 20 – William Henry Wright, prospector and newspaper owner (b. 1876)
- September 28 – P. L. Robertson, inventor (b. 1879)
- October 8 – Charles William Jefferys, artist and historian (b. 1869)
- November 20 – Lou Skuce, cartoonist (b. 1886)

=== Full date unknown ===
- Harry Cassidy, academic, social reformer and civil servant (b. 1900)

== See also ==
- List of Canadian films
