= 1821 in Canada =

- Decades: 1800s; 1810s; 1820s; 1830s; 1840s
- See also: History of Canada; Timeline of Canadian history; List of years in Canada

Events from the year 1821 in Canada.

== Incumbents ==
- Monarch: George IV

=== Federal government ===
- Parliament of Lower Canada: 11th
- Parliament of Upper Canada: 8th

=== Governors ===
- Governor of the Canadas: Robert Milnes
- Governor of New Brunswick: George Stracey Smyth
- Governor of Nova Scotia: John Coape Sherbrooke
- Commodore-Governor of Newfoundland: Richard Goodwin Keats
- Governor of Prince Edward Island: Charles Douglass Smith

== Events ==
- July 17 – Construction of the Lachine Canal in Montreal begins.
- July – The Hudson's Bay Company merges with archrivals, the Montreal-based North West Company, creating unemployment for a substantial proportion of their Métis workforce.
- No foreigners allowed in Russian-American waters, except at regular ports of call.

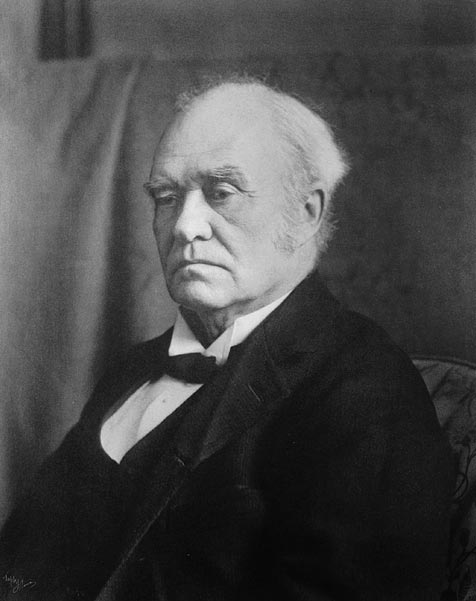
John Abbott

== Births ==
- February 21 – John Beverley Robinson, politician (d.1896)
- March 12 – John Abbott, politician and 3rd Prime Minister of Canada (d.1893)

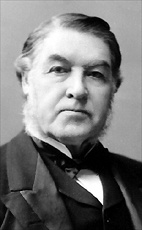
Charles Tupper

- July 2 – Charles Tupper, politician, Premier of Nova Scotia and 6th Prime Minister of Canada (d.1915)
- July 6 – Henri Bernier, politician, businessman and manufacturer (d.1893)
- August 13 – Philip Carteret Hill, politician and Premier of Nova Scotia (d.1894)
- August 18 – Maurice Laframboise, lawyer, judge and politician (d.1882)
