= 1883 in Canada =

- Decades: 1860s; 1870s; 1880s; 1890s; 1900s
- See also: History of Canada; Timeline of Canadian history; List of years in Canada

Events from the year 1883 in Canada.

== Incumbents ==
=== Crown ===
- Monarch – Victoria

=== Federal government ===
- Governor General – John Campbell, Marquess of Lorne (until October 23) then Henry Petty-Fitzmaurice, 5th Marquess of Lansdowne
- Prime Minister – John A. Macdonald
- Chief Justice – William Johnstone Ritchie (New Brunswick)
- Parliament – 5th (from 8 February)

=== Provincial governments ===
==== Lieutenant governors ====
- Lieutenant Governor of British Columbia – Clement Francis Cornwall
- Lieutenant Governor of Manitoba – James Cox Aikins
- Lieutenant Governor of New Brunswick – Robert Duncan Wilmot
- Lieutenant Governor of Nova Scotia – Adams George Archibald (until July 4) then Matthew Henry Richey
- Lieutenant Governor of Ontario – John Beverley Robinson
- Lieutenant Governor of Prince Edward Island – Thomas Heath Haviland
- Lieutenant Governor of Quebec – Théodore Robitaille

==== Premiers ====
- Premier of British Columbia – Robert Beaven (until January 29) then William Smithe
- Premier of Manitoba – John Norquay
- Premier of New Brunswick – Daniel Lionel Hanington (until March 3) then Andrew George Blair
- Premier of Nova Scotia – William Thomas Pipes
- Premier of Ontario – Oliver Mowat
- Premier of Prince Edward Island – William Wilfred Sullivan
- Premier of Quebec – Joseph-Alfred Mousseau

=== Territorial governments ===
==== Lieutenant governors ====
- Lieutenant Governor of Keewatin – James Cox Aikins
- Lieutenant Governor of the North-West Territories – Edgar Dewdney

== Events ==
- January 23 – Manitoba election
- January 29 – William Smithe becomes premier of British Columbia, replacing Robert Beaven
- February 27 – Ontario election: Sir Oliver Mowat's Liberals win a fourth consecutive majority
- August 31 – The Calgary Herald publishes its first issue
- November 18 – Canada adopts Standard Time
- December 1 – Regina officially declared a town.

=== Full date unknown ===
- Andrew Blair becomes premier of New Brunswick, replacing Daniel Hanington
- Augusta Stowe, daughter of Emily Stowe, is the first woman graduated by the Toronto Medical School.
- The Toronto Women's Suffrage Association replaces the Literary Club of 1876.
- Nickel-copper ore is discovered at Murray Mine in Sudbury during construction of the Canadian Pacific Railway (CPR).
- Medicine Hat is settled by European Canadians when the CPR crosses the South Saskatchewan River.

== Births ==
=== January to June ===
- January 30 – Mountenay Du Val, conservationist
- February 28 – Fernand Rinfret, politician (d.1939)
- March 4 – Sam Langford, boxer (d.1956)
- March 5 – Marius Barbeau, ethnographer and folklorist (d.1969)
- March 25 – Talbot Papineau, lawyer and soldier (d.1917)
- April 18 – Isabel Meighen, wife of Arthur Meighen, 9th Prime Minister of Canada (d.1985)
- June 22 – John Bracken, politician and 11th Premier of Manitoba (d.1969)

=== July to December ===
- August 7 – Gordon Sidney Harrington, politician and Premier of Nova Scotia (d.1943)
- October 2 – Robert Boyle, physicist
- November 24 – William Henry Fenton, Ontario politician (d. 1972)
- November 30 – James Garfield Gardiner, politician, Minister and Premier of Saskatchewan (d.1962)
- December 27 – Cyrus S. Eaton, investment banker, businessman and philanthropist (d.1979)

== Deaths ==
- June 18 – François Norbert Blanchet, missionary (b.1795)
- June 26 – Sir Edward Sabine, soldier and scientist (b.1788)
- June 30 – Albert James Smith, politician and Minister (b.1822)
- August 14 – James Cockburn, politician (b.1819)
- August 16 – Richard Alleyn, lawyer, judge, educator and politician (b.1835)
