= 1962 in Canada =

- Decades: 1940s; 1950s; 1960s; 1970s; 1980s
- See also: History of Canada; Timeline of Canadian history; List of years in Canada

Events from the year 1962 in Canada.

== Incumbents ==
=== Crown ===
- Monarch – Elizabeth II

=== Federal government ===
- Governor General – Georges Vanier
- Prime Minister – John Diefenbaker
- Chief Justice – Patrick Kerwin (Ontario)
- Parliament – 24th (until 19 April) then 25th (from 27 September)

=== Provincial governments ===
==== Lieutenant governors ====
- Lieutenant Governor of Alberta – John Percy Page
- Lieutenant Governor of British Columbia – George Pearkes
- Lieutenant Governor of Manitoba – Errick Willis
- Lieutenant Governor of New Brunswick – Joseph Leonard O'Brien
- Lieutenant Governor of Newfoundland – Campbell Leonard Macpherson
- Lieutenant Governor of Nova Scotia – Edward Chester Plow
- Lieutenant Governor of Ontario – John Keiller MacKay
- Lieutenant Governor of Prince Edward Island – Frederick Walter Hyndman
- Lieutenant Governor of Quebec – Paul Comtois
- Lieutenant Governor of Saskatchewan – Frank Lindsay Bastedo

==== Premiers ====
- Premier of Alberta – Ernest Manning
- Premier of British Columbia – W.A.C. Bennett
- Premier of Manitoba – Dufferin Roblin
- Premier of New Brunswick – Louis Robichaud
- Premier of Newfoundland – Joey Smallwood
- Premier of Nova Scotia – Robert Stanfield
- Premier of Ontario – John Robarts
- Premier of Prince Edward Island – Walter Shaw
- Premier of Quebec – Jean Lesage
- Premier of Saskatchewan – Woodrow Lloyd

=== Territorial governments ===
==== Commissioners ====
- Commissioner of Yukon – Frederick Howard Collins (until May 1) then Gordon Robertson Cameron
- Commissioner of Northwest Territories – Robert Gordon Robertson

== Events ==
- March 21 – The birth-defect-causing drug thalidomide is banned
- May 2 – The Canadian dollar is pegged to the U.S. currency
- June 18 – In the 1962 Federal election John Diefenbaker's Progressive Conservative Party of Canada is reduced to a minority government
- July 1 – First medicare plan is launched in Saskatchewan to great protest by doctors
- July 30 – Trans-Canada Highway opens
- August 6 – A Premiers Conference is held in Victoria, British Columbia
- September 1 – Place Ville Marie opens in Montreal
- September 29 – Alouette 1, Canada's first satellite, is launched.
- October 25 – The Bedford Institute of Oceanography opens in Nova Scotia
- October 25-November 12 – The Cuban Missile Crisis occurs. Diefenbaker refuses to put Canadian forces on alert, angering the U.S. government.
- December 11 – Ronald Turpin and Arthur Lucas was hanged.
- The Globe and Mail adds the Report on Business section

== Arts and literature ==
=== New books ===
- Max Aitken – The Decline and Fall of Lloyd George
- W. O. Mitchell – The Kite
- Marshall McLuhan – The Gutenberg Galaxy
- George Woodcock – Anarchism
- Farley Mowat – The Black Joke
- Thomas B. Costain – The Last Plantagenets

=== Awards ===
- See 1962 Governor General's Awards for a complete list of winners and finalists for those awards.
- Stephen Leacock Award: W. O. Mitchell, Jake and the Kid

=== Television ===
- Mister Rogers' Neighborhood premieres on CBC

=== Theatre ===
- The first Shaw Festival opens

== Sport ==
- April 22 – The Toronto Maple Leafs win their tenth Stanley Cup by defeating the Chicago Black Hawks.
- May 7 – The Ontario Hockey Association's Hamilton Red Wings win their only Memorial Cup by defeating the Central Alberta Hockey League's Edmonton Oil Kings 4 games to 1. The deciding Game 5 was played at Barton Street Arena in Hamilton, Ontario
- December 1–2 – The Winnipeg Blue Bombers win the Grey Cup in the famous fog bowl.

== Births ==
=== Unknown date ===
- Perry Bellegarde, national chief of the Assembly of First Nations (2014–present)

=== January to June ===
- January 17 – Jim Carrey, comedian and actor
- January 22 – Kevin Lamoureux, politician
- February 4 – Michael Riley, actor
- February 23 – John Hatch, basketball player
- February 27 – Susie Moloney, novelist
- March 20 – Ross Young, politician (d. 2021)
- March 21 – Kathy Greenwood, actress and comedian
- March 27 – Jann Arden, singer-songwriter
- March 29 – John Martin Crawford, serial killer (d. 2020)
- April 1 – John Wallace, rower and Olympic gold medallist
- April 11 – Colin Carrie, politician
- May 5 – Manoj Sood, actor
- May 31 – Corey Hart, musician
- June 12
  - Jordan Peterson, author, clinical psychologist and professor of psychology
  - Camilla Scott, Canadian actress
- June 23
  - Chris Collins, politician
  - Pat Kelly, ice speed skater

=== July to December ===
- July 7 – Ross Rutledge, field hockey player (d. 2004)
- July 10 – Mark Laforest, ice hockey player (d. 2025)
- July 14 – Diane Ratnik, volleyball player
- July 21 – Lee Aaron, rock and jazz singer
- August 8 – Mike Zanier, ice hockey player
- August 23 – Martin Cauchon, politician and Minister
- August 27 – Adam Oates, ice hockey and lacrosse player
- August 29 – Ian James Corlett, voice actor and producer
- August 31 – Wanda Guenette, volleyball player
- September 11 – Andrew Jackson, voice actor
- September 14 – Robert Herjavec, Croatian-born Canadian businessman, investor and author
- September 15 – Brad Willock, volleyball player
- September 18 – John Mann, rock musician and actor (d. 2019)
- September 22 – Normand D'Amour, actor
- September 24 – Nia Vardalos, actress, screenwriter and producer
- September 28 – Grant Fuhr, ice hockey player
- October 14 - Charles E. Bastien, animation director
- October 16 – Dan McTeague, politician
- October 30 – Rex Harrington, ballet dancer
- November 8 – Cliff Cullen, politician
- November 9 – Teryl Rothery, actress
- November 12 – Mark Hunter, ice hockey player, coach, and manager
- December 4 – Julie Lemieux, Canadian voice actress
- December 28 – Michelle Cameron, synchronized swimmer

== Deaths ==
- January 12 – James Garfield Gardiner, politician, Minister and Premier of Saskatchewan (b. 1883)
- January 24 – James Charles Brady, politician (b. 1876)
- March 3 – Cairine Wilson, Canada's first female Senator (b. 1885)
- August 20 – Joseph-Arsène Bonnier, politician (b. 1879)
- August 26 – Vilhjalmur Stefansson, Arctic explorer and ethnologist (b. 1879)
- October 23 – John Thomas Haig, politician (b. 1877)
- November 13 – Télesphore-Damien Bouchard, politician (b. 1881)
- November 21 – Frank Amyot, sprint canoer and Olympic gold medalist (b. 1904)
- December 8 – Allison Dysart, politician, lawyer, judge and 21st Premier of New Brunswick (b. 1880)
- December 22 – Solon Earl Low, politician (b. 1900)

== See also ==
- 1962 in Canadian television
- List of Canadian films
