= 1882 in Canada =

- Decades: 1860s; 1870s; 1880s; 1890s; 1900s
- See also: History of Canada; Timeline of Canadian history; List of years in Canada

Events from the year 1882 in Canada.

== Incumbents ==
=== Crown ===
- Monarch – Victoria

=== Federal government ===
- Governor General – John Campbell, Marquess of Lorne
- Prime Minister – John A. Macdonald
- Chief Justice – William Johnstone Ritchie (New Brunswick)
- Parliament – 4th (until 18 May)

=== Provincial governments ===
==== Lieutenant governors ====
- Lieutenant Governor of British Columbia – Clement Francis Cornwall
- Lieutenant Governor of Manitoba – Joseph-Édouard Cauchon (until September 29) then James Cox Aikins
- Lieutenant Governor of New Brunswick – Robert Duncan Wilmot
- Lieutenant Governor of Nova Scotia – Adams George Archibald
- Lieutenant Governor of Ontario – John Beverley Robinson
- Lieutenant Governor of Prince Edward Island – Thomas Heath Haviland
- Lieutenant Governor of Quebec – Théodore Robitaille

==== Premiers ====
- Premier of British Columbia – George Anthony Walkem (until June 13) then Robert Beaven
- Premier of Manitoba – John Norquay
- Premier of New Brunswick – John James Fraser (until May 25) then Daniel Lionel Hanington
- Premier of Nova Scotia – Simon Hugh Holmes (until May 23) then John Sparrow David Thompson (May 25 to July 18) then William Thomas Pipes (from August 3)
- Premier of Ontario – Oliver Mowat
- Premier of Prince Edward Island – William Wilfred Sullivan
- Premier of Quebec – Joseph-Adolphe Chapleau (until July 31) then Joseph-Alfred Mousseau

=== Territorial governments ===
==== Lieutenant governors ====
- Lieutenant Governor of Keewatin – Joseph-Édouard Cauchon (until September 29) then James Cox Aikins
- Lieutenant Governor of the North-West Territories – Edgar Dewdney

== Events ==
- May 8 – Prince Edward Island election: William Wilfred Sullivan's Conservatives win a fourth consecutive majority
- May 17 – Provisional districts of the North-West Territories are established between Manitoba and British Columbia: the districts of Assiniboia, Saskatchewan, Alberta, and Athabaska
- May 25 – John Sparrow David Thompson becomes premier of Nova Scotia, replacing Simon H. Holmes.
- June – New Brunswick election
- June 20
  - Federal election: Sir John A. Macdonald's Conservatives win a second consecutive majority.
  - Nova Scotia election
- June 13 – Robert Beaven becomes premier of British Columbia, replacing George Walkem.
- July 20 – British Columbia election
- July 31 – Joseph-Alfred Mousseau becomes premier of Quebec, replacing Sir Joseph-Adolphe Chapleau.
- August 3 – William T. Pipes becomes premier of Nova Scotia, replacing John Sparrow David Thompson.
- December 30 – The Royal Society of Canada is founded.

=== Full date unknown ===
- Daniel Hanington becomes premier of New Brunswick, replacing James Fraser.
- John Ware, a Texas cowboy, moves to Alberta. He introduces longhorn cattle into Canada and pioneers the development of rodeo.
- Newfoundland election
- The North-West Mounted Police (which later became the Royal Canadian Mounted Police) established a post in 1882 in Regina, Saskatchewan. The Royal Canadian Mounted Police (R.C.M.P.) have since established their main training academy there, which is called "Depot", or Depot Division.
- The North Bay Police Service is founded.

== Sport ==
- October 21 – The Canadian Rugby Football Union is founded. {Reference is needed. The link cited as well as the Rugby Canada Wiki note different years (1880 and 1884 respectively)}

== Births ==
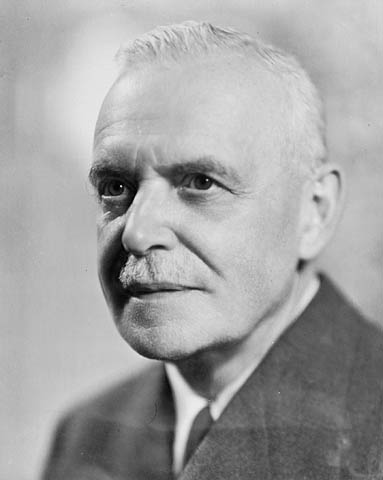
Louis St. Laurent

=== January to June ===
- January 8 – David Milne, painter, printmaker and writer (d.1953)
- February 1 – Louis St. Laurent, politician and 12th Prime Minister of Canada (d.1973)
- February 2 – Geoffrey O'Hara, composer, singer and music professor (d.1967)
- February 4 – E. J. Pratt, poet (d.1964)
- February 11 – John Queen, politician (d.1946)
- March 6 – Barbara Hanley, first woman to be elected a mayor in Canada (d.1959)
- April 18 – Isabel Meighen, wife of Canadian prime minister Arthur Meighen (d. 1985)
- May 26 – Charles Edward Bothwell, politician and barrister (d.1967)
- June 9 – Robert Kerr, sprinter and Olympic gold medallist (d.1963)

=== July to December ===
- July 16 – Edward Earle, Canadian-born American actor (d. 1972 in the United States)
- July 19 – Sarah Ramsland, politician and first woman elected to the Legislative Assembly of Saskatchewan (d.1964)
- October 3 – A. Y. Jackson, painter, one of the Group of Seven (d.1974)
- December 18 – Albert James Bradshaw, politician (d.1956)
- December 25 – John Stewart McDiarmid, politician and Lieutenant-Governor of Manitoba (d.1965)

== Deaths ==
- February 1 – Maurice Laframboise, lawyer, judge and politician (b.1821)
- March 25 – Charles-René-Léonidas d'Irumberry de Salaberry, militia officer (b.1820)
- August 7 – Antoine Gérin-Lajoie, poet and novelist (b.1824)
- September 15 – Jacques Philippe Lantier, businessman, author and politician (b.1814)
- December 9 – Hugh Allan, businessman (b.1810)

== Historical documents ==
Prime Minister Macdonald explains near-starvation policy to control Indigenous peoples

Prime Minister Macdonald welcomes Chinese as CPR labourers, but not as settlers

MP tells House of Commons that land policy in N.W.T. should favour settler over speculator

Alberta ranchers endure hunger while struggling through multi-day snowstorm

"To spread the light and sow the seed of Unionism" - Labour newspaper Trades Union Advocate says Toronto labour parade roused union enthusiasm

Ontario School of Art teaches freehand and model drawing, geometry, perspective, advanced freehand, ornamental design, watercolours, and oil
