= 1817 in Canada =

- Decades: 1790s; 1800s; 1810s; 1820s; 1830s
- See also: History of Canada; Timeline of Canadian history; List of years in Canada

Events from the year 1817 in Canada.

== Incumbents ==
- Monarch: George III

=== Federal government ===
- Parliament of Lower Canada: 9th (starting January 15)
- Parliament of Upper Canada: 7th (starting February 4)

=== Governors ===
- Governor of the Canadas: Robert Milnes
- Governor of New Brunswick: George Stracey Smyth
- Governor of Nova Scotia: John Coape Sherbrooke
- Commodore-Governor of Newfoundland: Richard Goodwin Keats
- Governor of Prince Edward Island: Charles Douglass Smith

== Events ==
- February 4 – Francois Page petitions for monopoly of navigation of Lower Canadian Rivers, by an invention of which he produces a model.
- February 18 – Mr. McCord reads a petition for the deepening of the St. Lawrence.
- February 28 – One Goudie and others petition for a monopoly of navigation of Lake Champlain, in Canada, as like U.S. monopolists injure Canadian Commerce, by trading into Canada.

=== Full date unknown ===
- Famine in Newfoundland due to poor postwar economy.
- Nova Scotia population estimated at 78,345.
- David Thompson takes post as chief surveyor for International Boundary Commission.
- The Rush-Bagot Agreement limits the number of battleships on the Great Lakes to a total of eight.

== Births ==
- January 1 – Francis Godschall Johnson, politician (d.1894)
- January 29 – John Palliser, explorer and geographer (d.1887)
- February 17 – Donald Alexander Macdonald, politician (d.1896)
- September 6 – Alexander Tilloch Galt, politician and a Father of Confederation (d.1893)
- November 8 – Théophile Hamel, painter (d.1870)
- November 23 – William Jack, astronomer (d.1886)

=== Full date unknown ===
- John Chipman Wade, politician and lawyer (d.1892)

== Deaths ==
- November 23 – James Glenie, army officer, military engineer, businessman, office holder, and politician (b.1750)
