= 1894 in Canada =

- Decades: 1870s; 1880s; 1890s; 1900s; 1910s
- See also: History of Canada; Timeline of Canadian history; List of years in Canada

Events from the year 1894 in Canada.

== Incumbents ==
=== Crown ===
- Monarch – Victoria

=== Federal government ===
- Governor General – The Earl of Aberdeen
- Prime Minister – John Thompson (until December 12) then Mackenzie Bowell (from December 21)
- Parliament – 7th
- Chief Justice – Samuel Henry Strong (Ontario)

=== Provincial governments ===
==== Lieutenant governors ====
- Lieutenant Governor of British Columbia – Edgar Dewdney
- Lieutenant Governor of Manitoba – John Christian Schultz
- Lieutenant Governor of New Brunswick – John James Fraser
- Lieutenant Governor of Nova Scotia – Malachy Bowes Daly
- Lieutenant Governor of Ontario – George Airey Kirkpatrick
- Lieutenant Governor of Prince Edward Island – Jedediah Slason Carvell (until February 14) then George William Howlan (from February 21)
- Lieutenant Governor of Quebec – Joseph-Adolphe Chapleau

==== Premiers ====
- Premier of British Columbia – Theodore Davie
- Premier of Manitoba – Thomas Greenway
- Premier of New Brunswick – Andrew George Blair
- Premier of Nova Scotia – William Stevens Fielding
- Premier of Ontario – Oliver Mowat
- Premier of Prince Edward Island – Frederick Peters
- Premier of Quebec – Louis-Olivier Taillon

=== Territorial governments ===
==== Lieutenant governors ====
- Lieutenant Governor of Keewatin – John Christian Schultz
- Lieutenant Governor of the North-West Territories – Charles Herbert Mackintosh

==== Premiers ====
- Chairman of the Executive Committee of the North-West Territories – Frederick Haultain

== Events ==
- January 1 – the town of Calgary is incorporated as a city
- February 20 – Manitoba Schools Question: The Supreme Court refuses to hear the appeal of Manitoba francophones.
- April 27 – Canada's largest known landslide occurs in Saint-Alban, Quebec. It displaced 185 million cubic metres (242 million cubic yards) of rock and dirt and left a 40-metre (130 ft) scar that covered 4.6 million square metres (50 million square feet).
- May 17 – Pioneers' Obelisk (Montreal) unveiled
- June 14 – Massey Hall opens in Toronto.
- June 26 – 1894 Ontario election: Sir Oliver Mowat's Liberals win a seventh majority.
- June 28 – July 9 – Colonial Conference of 1894 held in Ottawa.
- September 3 – Labour Day celebrated for the first time in Canada.
- October 31 – The third election of the North-West Legislative Assembly.
- December 12 – Prime Minister Sir John Thompson, dies of a heart attack at Windsor Castle, just hours after Queen Victoria inducted him to the Privy Council of the United Kingdom.
- December 21 – Mackenzie Bowell becomes prime minister.

=== Full date unknown ===
- Rondeau Provincial Park is established in southwestern Ontario.
- St. Albert cheese factory is founded.

== Arts and literature ==
- Toronto Mendelssohn Choir is founded.

== Sport ==
- March 22 – Montreal Hockey Club defeats Ottawa to win the first Stanley Cup challenge.

== Births ==
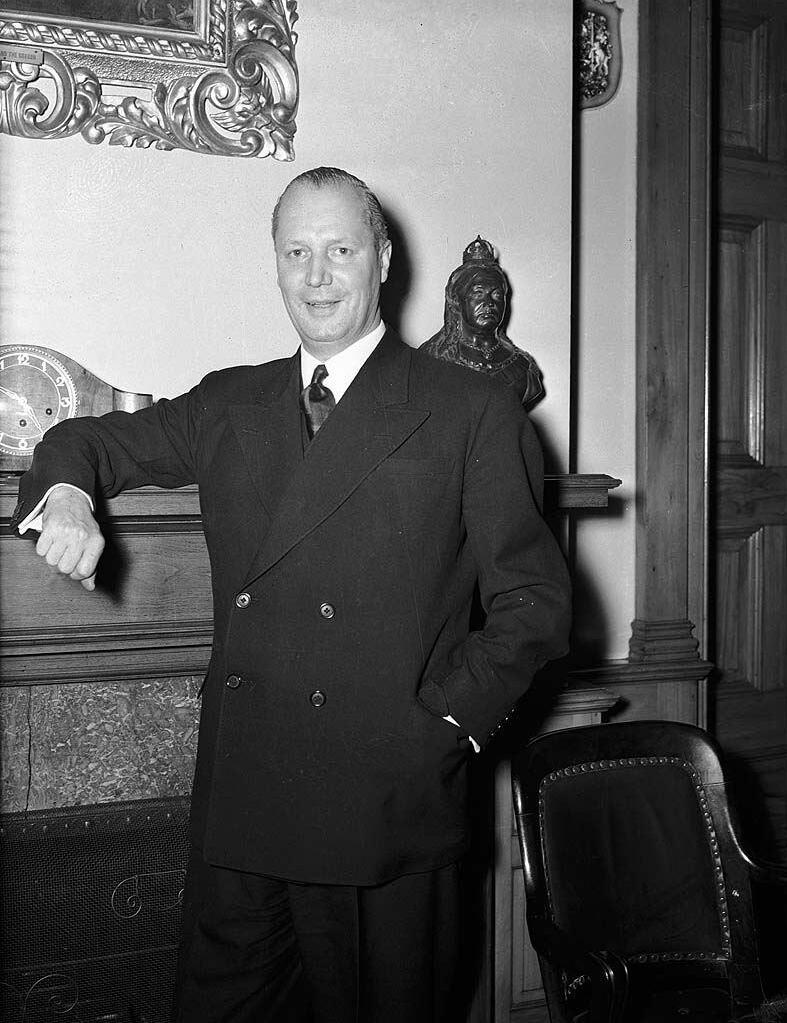
George Alexander Drew in 1947

=== January to June ===
- January 3 – James Lorimer Ilsley, politician, Minister and jurist (d.1967)
- January 5 – Norman MacKenzie, author, lawyer, professor and Senator (d.1986)
- February 8 – Billy Bishop, First World War flying ace (d.1956)
- May 7 – George A. Drew, politician and 14th Premier of Ontario (d.1973)
- May 13 – William Earl Rowe, politician and 20th Lieutenant Governor of Ontario (d.1984)
- May 29 – Beatrice Lillie, comic actress (d.1989)
- June 4 – La Bolduc, singer and musician (d.1941)
- June 5 – Roy Thomson, 1st Baron Thomson of Fleet, newspaper proprietor and media entrepreneur (d.1976)

=== July to December ===
- July 17 – Phillip Garratt, aviator
- July 24 – Theobald Butler Barrett, politician
- July 25 – Norman McLeod Rogers, lawyer, politician and Cabinet minister (d.1940)
- August – Gladys Porter, politician and first female member of the Legislative Assembly of Nova Scotia (d.1967)
- September 9 – Humphrey Mitchell, politician and trade unionist (d.1950)
- September 10 – H. H. Wrong, diplomat (d.1954)
- October 7 – Del Lord, film director and actor (d.1970 in the United States)
- November 5 – Harold Innis, professor of political economy and author (d.1952)
- November 13 – James Allan, politician (d.1992)
- November 26 – James Charles McGuigan, Cardinal (d.1974)
- December 13 – Chester Ronning, diplomat and politician (d.1984)

== Deaths ==
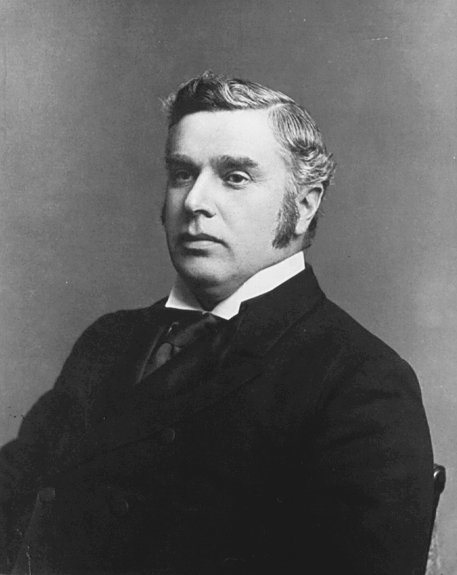
John Sparrow David Thompson

- March 19 – John Langton, businessman, political figure and civil servant (b.1808)
- April 16 – Joseph-Charles Taché, a Canadian noted for his contributions to many aspects of the fabric of Canada (b.1820)
- May 27 – Francis Godschall Johnson, politician (b.1817)
- June 22 – Alexandre-Antonin Taché, Roman Catholic priest, missionary, author and Archbishop (b.1823)
- September 5 – James Macleod, militia officer, lawyer, police officer, magistrate, judge and politician (b.1836)
- September 14 – Narcisse-Fortunat Belleau, lawyer, businessman and politician (b.1808)
- September 15 – Philip Carteret Hill, politician and Premier of Nova Scotia (b.1821)
- October 4 - Stephen Richards, politician, Ontario MPP, and Provincial Secretary (b. 1820)
- October 30 – Honoré Mercier, lawyer, journalist, politician and Premier of Quebec (b.1840)
- November 28 – Patrick Leonard MacDougall, General and author (b.1819)
- November 29 – Charles Stanley Monck, 4th Viscount Monck, Governor General (b.1819)
- December 12 – John Sparrow David Thompson, lawyer, judge, politician, university professor and 4th Prime Minister of Canada (b.1845)

== Historical documents ==
Prime Minister John Thompson's invitation to his Imperial Privy Council swearing-in at Windsor Castle

Prime Minister John Thompson's death at Windsor Castle, and Queen Victoria's response

Ethnologist crashes Dogribs' three-week muskox hunt

Chignecto Ship Railway would shorten voyages of eastern New Brunswick, P.E.I. and other shipping to U.S.A.
