= 1892 in Canada =

- Decades: 1870s; 1880s; 1890s; 1900s; 1910s
- See also: History of Canada; Timeline of Canadian history; List of years in Canada

Events from the year 1892 in Canada.

== Incumbents ==
=== Crown ===
- Monarch – Victoria

=== Federal government ===
- Governor General – Frederick Stanley
- Prime Minister – John Abbott (until November 24) then John Thompson (from December 5)
- Chief Justice – William Johnstone Ritchie (New Brunswick) (until 25 September) then Samuel Henry Strong (Ontario) (from 13 December)
- Parliament – 7th

=== Provincial governments ===
==== Lieutenant governors ====
- Lieutenant Governor of British Columbia – Hugh Nelson (until November 1) then Edgar Dewdney
- Lieutenant Governor of Manitoba – John Christian Schultz
- Lieutenant Governor of New Brunswick – Samuel Leonard Tilley
- Lieutenant Governor of Nova Scotia – Malachy Bowes Daly
- Lieutenant Governor of Ontario – Alexander Campbell (until May 24) then George Airey Kirkpatrick (from May 30)
- Lieutenant Governor of Prince Edward Island – Jedediah Slason Carvell
- Lieutenant Governor of Quebec – Auguste-Réal Angers (until December 5) then Joseph-Adolphe Chapleau

==== Premiers ====
- Premier of British Columbia – John Robson (until June 29) then Theodore Davie (from July 2)
- Premier of Manitoba – Thomas Greenway
- Premier of New Brunswick – Andrew George Blair
- Premier of Nova Scotia – William Stevens Fielding
- Premier of Ontario – Oliver Mowat
- Premier of Prince Edward Island – Frederick Peters
- Premier of Quebec – Charles Boucher de Boucherville (until December 16)then Louis-Olivier Taillon

=== Territorial governments ===
==== Lieutenant governors ====
- Lieutenant Governor of Keewatin – John Christian Schultz
- Lieutenant Governor of the North-West Territories – Joseph Royal

==== Premiers ====
- Chairman of the Executive Committee of the North-West Territories – Frederick Haultain

== Events ==
- June 29 – John Robson, Premier of British Columbia, dies in office
- July 2 – Theodore Davie becomes Premier of British Columbia
- July 8 – The Great Fire of 1892 destroys two-thirds of St. John's, Newfoundland
- July 9 – Parliament passes the Criminal Code, 1892, the first unified criminal law for all of Canada, under the direction of the Minister of Justice, John Thompson
- November 24 – Sir John Abbott resigns as Prime Minister
- December 5 – Sir John Thompson becomes Prime Minister
- December 16 – Sir Louis-Olivier Taillon becomes premier of Quebec for the second time, replacing Sir Charles-Eugène de Boucherville

=== Full date unknown ===
- The Toronto Star founded
- Harbord Collegiate Institute was opened
- Humberside Collegiate Institute opened
- Worthington, Ontario, is settled as a mining community.
- The first Canadian National Rugby-Football Championship game is played (Osgoode Hall defeats Montreal 45–5).

== Sport ==
- First documented women's ice hockey game takes place in Barrie, Ontario playing on an outdoor ice surface.

== Births ==
=== January to June ===
- March 4 – J.-Eugène Bissonnette, politician and physician
- April 8 – Mary Pickford, actress and studio co-founder (d.1979)
- May 3 – Jacob Viner, economist (d.1970)
- May 18 – John Croak, VC
- June 2 – Edward LeRoy Bowerman, politician (d.1977)

=== July to December ===
- July 8 – Sir Victor Tait, Canadian-born British airman and businessman (d.1988)
- July 14 – John Sissons, barrister, author, judge and politician (d.1969)
- August 2 – Jack L. Warner, studio mogul (d.1978)
- August 18 – Hal Foster, cartoonist (d.1982)
- September 21 – Donald Elmer Black, politician
- September 24 – Adélard Godbout, politician and 15th Premier of Quebec (d.1956)
- October 25 – Nell Shipman, actress, screenwriter, producer and animal trainer (d.1970)
- December 27 – Alfred Edwin McKay, World War I flying ace (d. 1917 in Belgium)

== Deaths ==
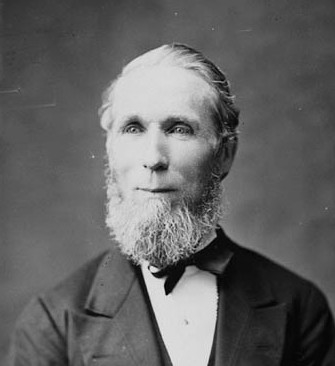
Alexander Mackenzie

- January 1 – John Chipman Wade, politician and lawyer (b.1817)
- January 20 – Samuel Barton Burdett, politician, lawyer and lecturer (b.1843)
- March 7 – Andrew Rainsford Wetmore, Premier of New Brunswick (b. 1820)
- April 6 – John Ostell, architect, surveyor and manufacturer (b.1813)
- April 17 – Alexander Mackenzie, building contractor, newspaper editor, politician and 2nd Prime Minister of Canada (b.1822)
- May 24 – Alexander Campbell, politician, Senator and 6th Lieutenant Governor of Ontario (b.1822)
- June 9 – William Grant Stairs, explorer, soldier and adventurer (b.1863)
- June 29 – John Robson, journalist, politician and Premier of British Columbia (b.1824)
- July 15 – William Donahue, merchant and politician (b.1834)
- August 30 – Frederick Newton Gisborne, Laid first under-sea cable in North America
- September 12 – Marc-Amable Girard, politician, Senator and 2nd Premier of Manitoba (b.1822)
- December 14 – Adams George Archibald, politician (b.1814)

== Historical documents ==
- Newspaper coverage of Great Fire of St. John's, Newfoundland
- U.S. accuses Canadian Pacific Railway of helping Chinese illegally cross border from British Columbia
- Running Wolf and Owl Child's performance of Moon Dance described
- "Completely won the hearts of her audience" - Poet of Kanien'kéhà:ka origin, Pauline Johnson, gives first solo recital in Toronto
- English visitor rides out from Lethbridge, Alberta to watch 2000-head cattle roundup
