= 1881 in Canada =

- Decades: 1860s; 1870s; 1880s; 1890s; 1900s
- See also: History of Canada; Timeline of Canadian history; List of years in Canada

Events from the year 1881 in Canada.

== Incumbents ==
=== Crown ===
- Monarch – Victoria

=== Federal government ===
- Governor General – John Campbell, Marquess of Lorne
- Prime Minister – John A. Macdonald
- Chief Justice – William Johnstone Ritchie (New Brunswick)
- Parliament – 4th

=== Provincial governments ===
==== Lieutenant governors ====
- Lieutenant Governor of British Columbia – Albert Norton Richards (until June 21) then Clement Francis Cornwall
- Lieutenant Governor of Manitoba – Joseph-Édouard Cauchon
- Lieutenant Governor of New Brunswick – Robert Duncan Wilmot
- Lieutenant Governor of Nova Scotia – Adams George Archibald
- Lieutenant Governor of Ontario – John Beverley Robinson
- Lieutenant Governor of Prince Edward Island – Thomas Heath Haviland
- Lieutenant Governor of Quebec – Théodore Robitaille

==== Premiers ====
- Premier of British Columbia – George Anthony Walkem
- Premier of Manitoba – John Norquay
- Premier of New Brunswick – John James Fraser
- Premier of Nova Scotia – Simon Hugh Holmes
- Premier of Ontario – Oliver Mowat
- Premier of Prince Edward Island – William Wilfred Sullivan
- Premier of Quebec – Joseph-Adolphe Chapleau

=== Territorial governments ===
==== Lieutenant governors ====
- Lieutenant Governor of Keewatin – Joseph-Édouard Cauchon
- Lieutenant Governor of the North-West Territories – David Laird (until December 3) then Edgar Dewdney

== Events ==
- January 17 – The Interprovincial Bridge connecting Ottawa to Hull, Quebec, opens
- February 16 – The Canadian Pacific Railway is incorporated
- April 4 – The 1881 census finds Canada's population to be 4,324,810
- May 24 – The overloaded steamer Victoria' capsizes on the Thames River near London, Ontario, killing 182 people.
- October – Clifton, Ontario, is renamed to Niagara Falls.
- December 2 – Quebec election: Joseph-Adolphe Chapleau's Conservatives win a majority

=== Full date unknown ===
- Manitoba's boundaries are extended north, east and west. Ontario disputes the eastward extension.

== Births ==
- January 2 – Frederick Varley, artist and member of the Group of Seven (d.1969)
- January 20 – Fred Dixon, politician (d.1931)
- March 18 – Oliver Seibert, professional ice hockey player (d.1944)
- June 17 – Tommy Burns, only Canadian born world heavyweight champion boxer (d.1955)
- September 27 – James Ralston, lawyer, soldier, politician and Minister (d.1948)
- October 23 – Al Christie, film director, producer and screenwriter (d.1951)
- November 4 – Hector Authier, politician, lawyer and news reporter/announcer (d.1971)
- November 19 – Robert James Manion, politician (d.1943)
- December 20 – Télesphore-Damien Bouchard, politician (d.1962)
- December 29 – George Washington Kendall (d.1921)
- December 31 – Albert Sévigny, politician (d.1961)
- December 31 – Elizabeth Arden (birth name, Florence Nightingale Graham), founder, Elizabeth Arden cosmetics (d.1966)

== Deaths ==
- January 28 – Luc Letellier de St-Just, politician and 3rd Lieutenant Governor of Quebec (b. 1820)

== Historical documents ==
John A. Macdonald expounds on CPR's troubled past and secure future in House of Commons speech

British editorial labels CPR and Canada bad investments

Wilfrid Laurier accuses Conservatives of "having sacrificed the public cause to personal cupidity"

Governor General speaks on prospects of Northwest Territories

Importance of steamboats to colonization along Saskatchewan River

Ojibwa entertain Governor General at Rat Portage (Kenora), Ont. (Note: racial stereotypes)

Chief Poundmaker tells Cree and Blackfoot legends to Governor General on tour

Colourful Blackfoot riders meet Governor General (Note: "savage" and other stereotypes)

Journalist describes beautiful Qu'Appelle Valley in gorgeous sunset

Nova Scotia woman tries to find a maid for $4/month, and describes some of the work
