= 1822 in Canada =

- Decades: 1800s; 1810s; 1820s; 1830s; 1840s
- See also: History of Canada; Timeline of Canadian history; List of years in Canada

Events from the year 1822 in Canada.

== Incumbents ==
- Monarch: George IV

=== Federal government ===
- Parliament of Lower Canada: 11th
- Parliament of Upper Canada: 8th

=== Governors ===
- Governor of the Canadas: Robert Milnes
- Governor of New Brunswick: George Stracey Smyth
- Governor of Nova Scotia: John Coape Sherbrooke
- Commodore-Governor of Newfoundland: Richard Goodwin Keats
- Governor of Prince Edward Island: Charles Douglass Smith

== Events ==
- Louis-Joseph Papineau and John Neilson, both members of the Legislative Assembly of Lower Canada, travel from Montreal to England to oppose an Act of Union identifying the French Canadians as a minority without language rights. The act is not passed in the British Parliament.

== Births ==
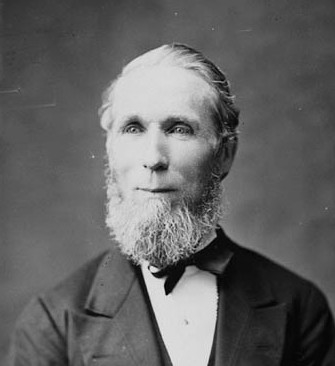
Alexander Mackenzie

- January 9 – George William Allan, politician and 11th Mayor of Toronto (died 1901)
- January 25 – William McDougall, lawyer, politician and a Father of Confederation (died 1905)
- January 28 – Alexander Mackenzie, building contractor, newspaper editor, politician and 2nd Prime Minister of Canada (died 1892)
- March 9 – Alexander Campbell, politician, Senator and 6th Lieutenant Governor of Ontario (died 1892)
- March 12 – Albert James Smith, politician and Minister (died 1883)
- April 25 – Marc-Amable Girard, politician, Senator and 2nd Premier of Manitoba (died 1892)
- May 2 – Jacob Yost Shantz, Mennonite farmer, businessman and industrialist (died 1909)
- May 4 – Charles Boucher de Boucherville, politician and 3rd Premier of Quebec (died 1915)
- July 16 – Charles Sangster, poet (died 1893)
- August 31 – Timothy Anglin, politician and Speaker of the House of Commons of Canada (died 1896)
- October 2 – Matthew Crooks Cameron, lawyer, judge and politician (died 1887)
- November 1 – Lemuel Owen, shipbuilder, banker, merchant, politician and Premier of Prince Edward Island (died 1912)
- November 13 – Thomas Heath Haviland, politician (died 1895)

=== Full date unknown ===
- Harvey William Burk, politician and farmer (died 1907)

== Deaths ==
- December 17 – Peter Fidler, fur trader, mapmaker, explorer (born 1769)
