= Joseph Borneuf =

Joseph Borneuf (26 September 1762 – 15 November 1819) was a Roman Catholic priest in Lower Canada.

Borneuf became a Sulpician after an extensive education; first at the Petit Séminaire de Québec and later at the Grand Séminaire. He was ordained priest by Bishop Jean-Olivier Briand in 1786 after which he entered the Séminaire de Saint-Sulpice in Montreal. he became a member of that community in 1788.
