= Gaye Porteous =

Canadian field hockey player

Personal information
- Full name: Gaye Lynn Porteous
- Born: June 26, 1965 (age 61) Calgary, Alberta, Canada

Sport
- Sport: Field hockey
Medal record
Women's field hockey
Representing Canada
Pan American Games
Silver medal – second place	1991 Havana	Team competition

Gaye Lynn Porteous (born June 26, 1965 in Calgary, Alberta) is a former field hockey player from Canada, who represented her native country at the 1992 Summer Olympics in Barcelona, Spain. There she ended up in seventh place with the Canadian National Women's Team.
