= 1893 in Canada =

- Decades: 1870s; 1880s; 1890s; 1900s; 1910s
- See also: History of Canada; Timeline of Canadian history; List of years in Canada

Events from the year 1893 in Canada.

== Incumbents ==
=== Crown ===
- Monarch – Victoria

=== Federal government ===
- Governor General – Frederick Stanley (until September 18) then John Hamilton-Gordon
- Prime Minister – John Thompson
- Chief Justice – Samuel Henry Strong (Ontario)
- Parliament – 7th

=== Provincial governments ===
==== Lieutenant governors ====
- Lieutenant Governor of British Columbia – Edgar Dewdney
- Lieutenant Governor of Manitoba – John Christian Schultz
- Lieutenant Governor of New Brunswick – Samuel Leonard Tilley (until September 21) then John Boyd (September 21 to December 4) then John James Fraser (from December 20)
- Lieutenant Governor of Nova Scotia – Malachy Bowes Daly
- Lieutenant Governor of Ontario – George Airey Kirkpatrick
- Lieutenant Governor of Prince Edward Island – Jedediah Slason Carvell
- Lieutenant Governor of Quebec – Joseph-Adolphe Chapleau

==== Premiers ====
- Premier of British Columbia – Theodore Davie
- Premier of Manitoba – Thomas Greenway
- Premier of New Brunswick – Andrew George Blair
- Premier of Nova Scotia – William Stevens Fielding
- Premier of Ontario – Oliver Mowat
- Premier of Prince Edward Island – Frederick Peters
- Premier of Quebec – Louis-Olivier Taillon

=== Territorial governments ===
==== Lieutenant governors ====
- Lieutenant Governor of Keewatin – John Christian Schultz
- Lieutenant Governor of the North-West Territories – Joseph Royal (until October 31) then Charles Herbert Mackintosh

==== Premiers ====
- Chairman of the Executive Committee of the North-West Territories – Frederick Haultain

== Events ==
- May 27 – Algonquin Provincial Park is established as a wildlife sanctuary in Ontario.
- September 16 – Calgary is incorporated as a city.
- October 27 – The National Council of Women of Canada meets for the first time.
- December 18 – Robert Machray is elected first Primate of the Anglican Church of Canada.

=== Full date unknown ===
- The Redpath Library is bestowed upon McGill University.
- Canada Evidence Act created.
- Jacques Cartier Monument (Montreal) unveiled.

== Sport ==
- March 22 – The Montreal Hockey Club wins the First Stanley Cup by defeating the Ottawa Hockey Club 3 to 1 at Montreal's Victoria Rink

== Births ==
=== January to June ===
- January 8 – Jean Désy, diplomat (d.1960)
- February 7 – Joseph Algernon Pearce, astrophysicist (d.1988)
- April 16 – Germaine Guèvremont, French-Canadian writer (d.1968)
- May 5 – J. Dewey Soper, Arctic explorer, zoologist, ornithologist and author (d.1982)
- May 7 – Frank J. Selke, ice hockey manager (d.1985)
- May 28 – Donald MacLaren, World War I flying ace, businessman (d.1988)
- June 5 – George Croil, first Chief of the Air Staff of the Royal Canadian Air Force (d.1959)
- June 16 – Ernest Lloyd Janney, Provisional Commander of the Canadian Aviation Corps (d.1941)
- June 20 – Austin Claude Taylor, politician (d.1965)
- June 23 – Merrill Denison, playwright (d.1975)

=== July to December ===
- July 7 – James White, World War I flying ace (d.1972)
- August 18 – Ernest MacMillan, conductor and composer (d.1973)
- August 21 – Wilfred Curtis, Chief of the Air Staff of the Royal Canadian Air Force (d.1977)
- October 12 – George Hodgson, swimmer and double Olympic gold medallist (d.1983)
- November 12 – Roy Kellock, jurist and Justice of the Supreme Court of Canada (d.1975)
- November 22 – Raymond Collishaw, World War I flying ace (d.1976)
- December 8 – J. Arthur Ross, politician (d.1958)
- December 23 – John Patrick Barry, politician and lawyer (d.1946)
- December 23 – Roy Brown, World War I flying ace (d.1944)

=== Full date unknown ===
- Parr, artist (d.1969)

== Deaths ==
=== January to June ===
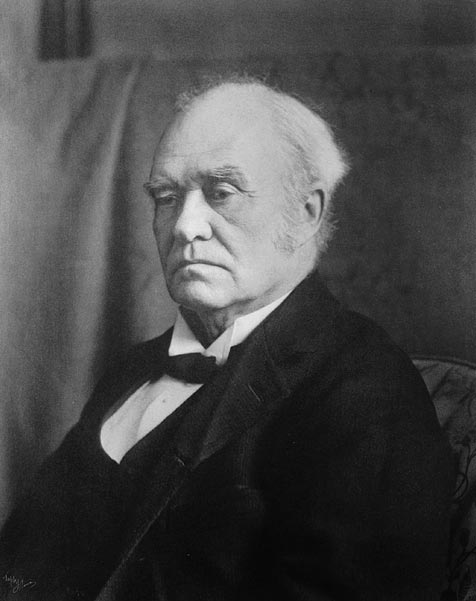
John Abbott

- January 26 – James Armstrong, politician (b.1830)
- February 18 – George-Édouard Desbarats, printer and inventor (b.1838)
- March 18 – David H. Armstrong, United States Senator from Missouri from 1877 till 1879. (b.1812)
- March 30 – Jane Mackenzie, second wife of Alexander Mackenzie, 2nd Prime Minister of Canada (b.1825)
- April 2 – Eden Colvile, Governor of Rupert's Land (b.1819)

=== July to December ===
- July 22 – John Rae, doctor and explorer (b.1813)
- September 19 – Alexander Tilloch Galt, politician and a Father of Confederation (b.1817)
- October 30 – John Abbott, politician and 3rd Prime Minister of Canada (b.1821)
- November 9 – Henri Bernier, politician, businessman and manufacturer (b.1821)
- December 9 – Charles Sangster, poet (b.1822)
