= 1895 in Canada =

- Decades: 1870s; 1880s; 1890s; 1900s; 1910s
- See also: History of Canada; Timeline of Canadian history; List of years in Canada

Events from the year 1895 in Canada.

== Incumbents ==
=== Crown ===
- Monarch – Victoria

=== Federal government ===
- Governor General – John Hamilton-Gordon
- Prime Minister – Mackenzie Bowell
- Chief Justice of Canada – Samuel Henry Strong (Ontario)
- Parliament – 7th

=== Provincial governments ===
==== Lieutenant governors ====
- Lieutenant Governor of British Columbia – Edgar Dewdney
- Lieutenant Governor of Manitoba – John Christian Schultz (until September 2) then James Colebrooke Patterson
- Lieutenant Governor of New Brunswick – John James Fraser
- Lieutenant Governor of Nova Scotia – Malachy Bowes Daly
- Lieutenant Governor of Ontario – George Airey Kirkpatrick
- Lieutenant Governor of Prince Edward Island – George William Howlan
- Lieutenant Governor of Quebec – Joseph-Adolphe Chapleau

==== Premiers ====
- Premier of British Columbia – Theodore Davie (until March 4) then John Herbert Turner
- Premier of Manitoba – Thomas Greenway
- Premier of New Brunswick – Andrew George Blair
- Premier of Nova Scotia – William Stevens Fielding
- Premier of Ontario – Oliver Mowat
- Premier of Prince Edward Island – Frederick Peters
- Premier of Quebec – Louis-Olivier Taillon

=== Territorial governments ===
==== Lieutenant governors ====
- Lieutenant Governor of Keewatin – John Christian Schultz (until September 2) then James Colebrooke Patterson
- Lieutenant Governor of the North-West Territories – Charles Herbert Mackintosh

==== Premiers ====
- Chairman of the Executive Committee of the North-West Territories – Frederick Haultain

== Events ==
- March – Maria Grant is the first woman in Canada to be elected to any office. She served six years on the Victoria School Board and was presented to the future George V as the only woman elected as a school trustee in Canada.
- March 2 – Theodore Davie resigns as premier of British Columbia
- March 4 – John Herbert Turner becomes premier of British Columbia
- April 16 – The town of Sturgeon Falls, Ontario, is incorporated.
- April 24 – Jean-Olivier Chénier Monument unveiled
- July 1 – Maisonneuve Monument unveiled
- October 2 – Additional provisional districts of the North-West Territories are established: the districts of Ungava, Mackenzie, Yukon, and Franklin. The districts of Keewatin and Athabaska are enlarged so that all points of Canada are either within a province or a district.
- The Chinese Board of Trade is formed in Vancouver
- First ascent of Mount Hector in Banff National Park.

== Sport ==
- March 9 – The Montreal Hockey Club wins their second Stanley Cup by defeating Queen's University 5 goals to 1 at Montreal's Victoria Rink

== Births ==
=== January to June ===
- February 1 – Conn Smythe, ice hockey manager and owner (d.1980)
- February 15 – Earl Thomson, athlete and Olympic gold medallist (d.1971)
- March 23 – John Robert Cartwright, jurist and Chief Justice of Canada (d.1979)
- April 30 – Philippe Panneton, physician, academic, diplomat and writer (d.1960)
- May 12 – William Giauque, chemist and Nobel laureate (d.1982)
- May 27 – Douglas Lloyd Campbell, politician and 13th Premier of Manitoba (d.1995)

=== July to December ===
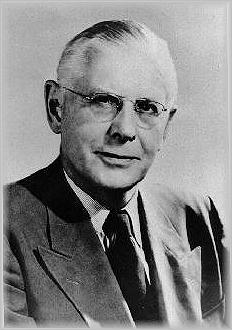
Leslie Frost

- July 5 – Frederic McGrand, physician and politician (d. 1988)
- July 7 – Thane Campbell, jurist, politician and Premier of Prince Edward Island (d.1978)
- July 29 – Albert A. Brown, politician and lawyer (d.1971)
- September 7 – Pete Parker, radio announcer (d.1991)
- September 18 – John Diefenbaker, politician and 13th Prime Minister of Canada (d.1979)
- September 20 – Leslie Frost, politician and 16th Premier of Ontario (d.1973)
- November 5 – Howard Charles Green, politician and Minister (d.1989)
- December 1 – Edwin Hansford, politician (d.1959)

== Deaths ==
- January 17 – Joseph Tassé, politician (b.1848)
- January 28 – Camille Lefebvre (b.1831)
- April 4 – Malcolm Alexander MacLean, 1st Mayor of Vancouver (b.1842)
- August 4 – Louis-Antoine Dessaulles, seigneur, journalist and politician (b.1818)
- September 4 – Antoine Plamondon, artist (b.1804)
- September 11 – Thomas Heath Haviland, politician (b.1822)
- September 15 – Hector Berthelot, lawyer, journalist and publisher (b.1842)
