= 1818 in Canada =

- Decades: 1790s; 1800s; 1810s; 1820s; 1830s
- See also: History of Canada; Timeline of Canadian history; List of years in Canada

Events from the year 1818 in Canada.

== Incumbents ==
- Monarch: George III

=== Federal government ===
- Parliament of Lower Canada: 9th
- Parliament of Upper Canada: 7th

=== Governors ===
- Governor of the Canadas: Robert Milnes
- Governor of New Brunswick: George Stracey Smyth
- Governor of Nova Scotia: John Coape Sherbrooke
- Commodore-Governor of Newfoundland: Richard Goodwin Keats
- Governor of Prince Edward Island: Charles Douglass Smith

== Events ==
- April 1 – An expedition sails for the North Pole.
- August 28 – The Governor (Charles Lennox, 4th Duke of Richmond) dies of rabies.

=== Full date unknown ===
- Halifax and St. John's are made free ports.
- 49th parallel becomes British North America/U.S. border from Lake of the Woods to the Rocky Mountains
- Dalhousie University is established.

== Births ==
- January 17 – Antoine-Aimé Dorion, politician and jurist (d. 1891)
- March 10 – John Ross, lawyer, politician, and businessman. Born in County Antrim, Ireland (d. 1871)
- March 19 – Élisabeth Bruyère, nun (d. 1876)
- March 25 – Edwin Randolph Oakes, politician (d.1889)
- May 8 – Samuel Leonard Tilley, Premier of New Brunswick (d. 1896)
- September – Hugh Cossart Baker, Sr., banker, businessman and mathematician (d.1859)
- September 4 – Louis-François Richer Laflèche, diocese of Trois-Rivières (d.1898)
- October 1 – David Christie, politician (d.1880)
- November 29 – George Brown, journalist, politician and one of the Fathers of the Confederation (d.1880)

=== Full date unknown ===
- Alexander Francis Macdonald, politician (d.1913)

== Deaths ==
- January 1 - Richard Pattinson, politician (born 1773)
- August 3 - John Jones, Lower Canada Assemblyman (born c. 1752)
- November 25 – Jonathan Odell, poet (born 1737)
