= 1630s in Canada =

Canada in 1630s

Events from the 1630s in Canada.

== Events ==
- 1631: Charles De La Tour builds Fort La Tour (also known as Fort Saint Marie) at the mouth of the Saint John River.
- 1632: British lose control of Acadia through the Treaty of Saint-Germain-en-Laye, which returns Quebec to France.
- 1632: Isaac de Razilly sails from France with 300 people hoping to establish a permanent French settlement in Acadia.
- 1632: Starting this year, Dutch colonists begin to demand more farmlands.
- 1633–: English and French settlers enlist mainland Indians, mostly Micmac to massacre Beothuk people of Newfoundland, who are now extinct. "Red" Indian apparently derives from these people, who painted their bodies with red ochre. Shanawdithit, the last Beothuk, died in 1829. Little is known of their customs, language, religion. Beothuk was not likely their tribal self-name.
- 1633–35: New smallpox outbreaks among Indians of New England, New France, and New Netherland.
- 1633: David Kirke is knighted.
- 1634–40: The Huron nation is reduced by half from European diseases (smallpox epidemic, 1639).
- 1634: The trade settlement at Trois-Rivières is founded.
- c. 1635: English fishing interests secure a virtual prohibition on efforts to colonize Newfoundland.
- 1636–37: Pequot War in New England against the English (Niantics, Narragansetts later joined). Capt. John Mason burnt sleeping Pequot village at Mystic River, pinning the people inside the flames by gunfire, killing more than 600 people in a surprise attack. Mohawks behead fleeing Pequot leaders to prove they were not involved.
- 1636: French crown grants Gulf of Maine and Bay of Fundy to d'Aulnay; La Tour gets Nova Scotia peninsula.
- 1637: David Kirke is named first governor of Newfoundland.
- 1639: Marie de l'Incarnation founds an Ursuline convent and a school for French and Indian girls in the settlement of Quebec.
- 1639: Smallpox epidemic decimates Huron people; population reduced by 50%.
- 1639: Dutch governor-general William Kieft adopts policy of exterminating the hostile Indians and taxing the rest. Dutch soldiers aid Mohawk allies to carry out Pavonia massacre, where Dutch soldiers played kickball with the heads of the women and children refugees they had killed.
- 1639: The Jesuit mission of Sainte-Marie among the Hurons is established at Wendake.

== See also ==
- List of French forts in North America
- Former colonies and territories in Canada
- List of North American settlements by year of foundation
- Timeline of the European colonization of North America
- History of Canada
- Timeline of Canada history
- List of years in Canada
