= 1610s in Canada =

Period events

Events from the 1610s in Canada.

== Events ==
- 1610–11: The English explorer Henry Hudson, in Dutch service, continues the fruitless search for a passage to Asia.
- 1610: Henry Hudson, in service of the Netherlands, explores the river named for him. Hudson explores Hudson Bay in spite of a mutinous crew. Manhattan Indians attack his ship. Mahican people make peaceful contact, and a lucrative fur trade begins.
- 1610: Étienne Brûlé lives among Huron and is first European to see Lakes Ontario, Huron, and Superior.
- 1611: Champlain builds fur post at Montreal.
- 1612: Champlain is named Governor of New France.
- 1613: Port Royal sacked by Samuel Argall and his pirates from Virginia.
- 1613: St. John's, Newfoundland is founded.
- 1614: Franciscan Recollet friars arrive to convert the Indians.
- 1615: French Roman Catholic missionaries arrive in Canada.
- 1615: Champlain attacks Onondaga villages with the help of a Huron war party, this turning the Iroquois League against the French.
- 1616–20: Smallpox epidemic strikes New England tribes between Narragansett Bay and the Penobscot River.
- 1617: Louis Hebert, an apothecary who had stayed at Port Royal twice, brings his wife and children to Quebec, thus becoming the first true habitant (permanent settler supporting his family from the soil).

== Births ==
- Marie Guenet de Saint-Ignace (1610–1646), French-Canadian abbess and hospital manager

== See also ==
- List of French forts in North America
- Former colonies and territories in Canada
- List of North American settlements by year of foundation
- Timeline of the European colonization of North America
- History of Canada
- Timeline of Canada history
- List of years in Canada
