= 1620s in Canada =

Events from the 1620s in Canada.

== Events ==
- 1621: Dutch West India Company chartered, expands up the Hudson and Delaware rivers.
- 1621: James I of England (VI of Scotland) grants Acadia to Sir William Alexander who renames it New Scotland (Nova Scotia).
- 1625: the Baronet of Nova Scotia is founded.
- 1625: French settlements in the West Indies begin, exporting sugar and tobacco, and emigration to Canada is encouraged among traders and fishermen.
- 1625: The Franciscan friars are replaced by the heroic priests of the richer, better-organized Society of Jesus. Jesuits begin missionary work among the Indians in the Quebec area. Jean de Brébeuf founds missions in Huronia, near Georgian Bay.
- 1626: Peter Minuit, governor of New Netherland, buys Manhattan Island for 60 guilders(equivalent to $24 USD now) worth of trade goods from the Canarsie Indians (Dutch later have to pay Manhattan Indians, actual occupants of the island). Dutch policy is land payments to Indians, neutrality in Indian conflicts relating to French-English struggle.
- 1627: Cardinal Richelieu, chief adviser to Louis XIII, organizes a joint-stock company, the Company of One Hundred Associates (also known as the Company of New France), to establish a French Empire in North America. It is given a fur monopoly and title to all lands claimed by New France (April 29). In exchange, they are to establish a French colony of 4000 by 1643, which they fail to do.
- 1628: Olivier Le Jeune, an 8-year-old boy from Madagascar, arrives in Quebec. He is the first recorded slave purchase in New France. Le Jeune is probably the first person of African origin to live most of his life in Canada.
- 19 July 1629: Quebec City is captured by an English fleet led by the adventurer David Kirke.

== See also ==
- List of French forts in North America
- Former colonies and territories in Canada
- List of North American settlements by year of foundation
- Timeline of the European colonization of North America
- History of Canada
- Timeline of Canada history
- List of years in Canada
