= 1670s in Canada =

Events from the 1670s in Canada.

== Events ==
- 2 May 1670: Charles II (England) charters Hudson's Bay Company in London. Underwritten by a group of English merchants, HBC is granted trade rights over Rupert's Land—i.e., all territory draining into Hudson Bay. No treaties or compensation to the First Nations there (mostly Ojibwe, Cree peoples) until the late 19th and early 20th centuries; no treaties ever made on large expanse east of Bay.
- 1671–84: HBC Forts at mouths of Bay rivers: Moose 1671; Severn 1680; Albany 1683; York, finally on Hayes.
- 14 June 1671 – At Sault Ste. Marie, four Jesuit priests led by Father Claude-Jean Allouez representing the Roman Catholic Church, and Simon Francois Daumont, Sieur de St. Lusson held aloft a sword and a symbolic tuft of sod, and declared to the indigenous First Nations peoples that all of the Great Lakes country was henceforth a possession of King Louis XIV of France.
- 1672: Colonial postal officials employ Aboriginal couriers to carry mail between New York City and Albany; winter weather is too severe for white couriers.
- 1672: Comte de Frontenac becomes governor general of New France, later quarrelling frequently with the intendant and the bishop.
- 1673: The explorations of Louis Jolliet and Father Jacques Marquette lead to the discovery of the Mississippi River.
- 1674: Laval becomes the first bishop of Quebec.
- 1675–76: Bacon's Rebellion—Third major war between Virginia settlers and Virginia and Maryland Native Americans. Bacon's army kills and enslaves Susquehannock, Occaneechi, Appomatuck, Manakin, members of Powhattan Confederacy. Bacon leads brief rebellion against English Crown authority when his English military murderer commission is rescinded because of excessive brutalities.
- 1675-76: Metacom's (King Philip's) War against the New England Confederation of colonies - Wampanoag, later joined by Abenaki, Nipmucs and Narragansetts. Mohawks stay neutral; Mohegans, Pequots, Niantics, and Massachusetts tribes back the English. Metacom loses. English government executes Metacom in 1676, nails body parts to town hall, sells wife, children, followers to plantation slavery.
- 1675: The population of New France is almost 8,000.
- 1676: West Country merchants attempt to enforce restrictions on settlement in Newfoundland.
- 1678: Louis Hennepin is the first European to see Niagara Falls.
- 1678–79: Daniel Greysolon Duluth of France explores Great Lakes and negotiates treaties between the warring Ojibwa and Sioux.

== Births ==
- J Raudot, Intendant of New France

== See also ==
- Former colonies and territories in Canada
- History of Canada
- List of Hudson's Bay Company trading posts
- List of years in Canada
- Timeline of the European colonization of North America
