= 1640s in Canada =

Events from the 1640s in Canada.

== Events ==
- c. 1640: Beavers and otters nearly exterminated in Haudenosaunee country. To expand territory, Haudenosaunee launch decades-long "Beaver Wars" against Wendat and Algonquin.
- 1640: Françoise Marie Jacqueline, youthful daughter of a physician from Nogent, France, sets sail for what would become Saint John, New Brunswick, to wed Charles de Saint-Étienne de La Tour, Governor of Acadia, and to assume many roles, including wife, confidant, soldier, and businesswoman. In spite of the ongoing and escalating conflict between LaTour and his well-connected rival Governor, Charles de Menou, Sieur d'Aulnay, she would elevate LaTour's status amongst the power brokers of the day in France and in the growing English colonies to the south. In 1645, she would successfully defend Fort LaTour against a vicious attack by d'Aulnay, only to be betrayed, ultimately losing her life. Buried in the vicinity of the fort, in what is now downtown Saint John, her bones have never been found. Remains of the fort still exist, protected as a national heritage site, hidden beneath layers of ancient soil.
- 17 May 1642: The trade settlement at Montreal is founded by the Sieur de Maisonneuve.
- 5 January 1643: The first Mount Royal Cross erected
- 1644: Second Powhatan Confederacy uprising against Jamestown, Virginia; its leader, Opechancanough, dies in captivity.
- 1644 Jeanne Mance (Baptized Langres, France 12 November 1606 Died 18 June 1673) opens Hotel-Dieu, the first hospital in North America.
- 1645-63: Under the proprietorship of Richelieu's company's colonial agent, the Community of Habitants, the new French colony takes shape along the St. Lawrence.
- 1648-49: After the Haudenosaunee brutally ravage Wendat country and disperse the Wendat nation north of the St. Lawrence, they turn against New France itself.
- 1649-64: the Beaver Wars: Encouraged by the English, and the need for more beaver for trade (their own area being hunted out), Haudenosaunee (Iroquois) make war on Wendat (1649), Tobaccos (1649), Neutrals (1650–51), Erie (1653–56), Odawa (1660), Illinois and Miami (1680–84), and members of the Mahican confederation. English, pleased with this, agree to 2-Row Wampum Peace treaty, 1680.
- 1649: Attacks by the Haudenosaunee disperse the Wendat; disrupts fur trade over the next fifteen years.
- 16 March 1649: The Jesuit father Jean de Brébeuf is martyred during Haudenosaunee raids on the Wendat at St-Ignace.
- 16 June 1649: The Jesuit missionaries at Sainte-Marie among the Hurons abandon the mission, burning it to the ground and taking refuge at Christian Island.

== See also ==
- List of North American settlements by year of foundation
- Timeline of the European colonization of North America
- History of Canada
- Timeline of Canada history
- List of years in Canada
