= 1660s in Canada =

Events from the 1660s in Canada.

== Events ==
- 1649-64: the Beaver Wars: Encouraged by the English, and the need for more beaver for trade (their own area being hunted out), Haudenosee (Iroquois) make war on Hurons (1649), Tobaccos (1649), Neutrals (1650–51), Erie (1653–56), Ottawa (1660), Illinois and Miami (1680–84), and members of the Mahican confederation. English, pleased with this, agree to 2-Row Wampum Peace treaty, 1680.
- 1660s-1670s French compete with Hudson's Bay Company (HBC) and British fur traders out of New York.
- 1660-64: In 1660, Dutch governor-general Peter Stuyvesant decides to hold Indian children hostage for the behavior of increasingly angry tribespeople. Hostages sold into Caribbean plantation slavery.
- 1660: English Navigation Act prohibits foreigners from trading with English colonies.
- May 1660: Adam Dollard des Ormeaux and about sixty others withstand an attack by over 500 Iroquois at Long Sault. It is traditionally said that the small party fights so well that the Iroquois decide not to attack Montreal.
- 1663: The French Crown takes personal control of Canada from a private company, which becomes a royal province. Louis XIV's brilliant minister J. B. Colbert reorganizes New France directly under royal authority. Administration is divided between a military governor and a more powerful intendant, both ruling from Quebec City but under orders from Paris. The fur trade is granted to a new monopoly, the Company of the West Indies.
- 1663: New France has a population of about 3,000.
- 1663: Laval organizes the Seminaire du Québec, a college of theology which eventually becomes Université Laval (1852).
- 1664: The British invade and conquer the Dutch at New Amsterdam, renaming it New York. England gains control of New Netherland from the Dutch and become allies and trade partners with the Iroquois.
- 1664: Hans Bernhardt is the first recorded German immigrant.
- 1665-72: Jean Talon (c.1625-94), the first intendant of New France, sets out to establish New France as a prosperous, expanding colony rivaling the thriving English colonies to the south. He invites many new settlers, including young women. He also tries to diversify the economy beyond furs and to build trade with Acadia and the West Indies. Talon is recalled before he can carry out his policies, however.
- 1665: The Carignan-Salières Regiment is sent from France to Quebec to deal with the Iroquois. Many of its members stay on as settlers.
- 1666: The Carignan-Salières Regiment destroys five Mohawk villages, eventually leading to peace between the Iroquois and the French.
- 1667: First census of New France records 668 families, totalling 3,215 non-native inhabitants.
- 1667: France, England, and the Netherlands sign the Breda Treaty in July and with this England gives Acadia to France.
- 1668-69: Pierre-Esprit Radisson and Medard Chouart, sieur de Groseilliers, explore west of the St. Lawrence River as far as Lake Superior, plus the Hudson Bay region, for England.
- 1668: The Carignan-Salières regiment is recalled to France, but several hundred choose to remain behind, many in return for local seigneuries.
- 1669: European colonies first discover Lake Erie
- 1669: HBC Ft. Charles, at foot of James Bay, becomes Ft. Rupert.

== See also ==
- Former colonies and territories in Canada
- Timeline of the European colonization of North America
- History of Canada
- List of years in Canada
