= 1680s in Canada =

Events from the 1680s in Canada.

== Events ==
- 1682: René Robert Cavelier, Sieur de La Salle reaches the mouth of the Mississippi River and claims the entire Mississippi Valley for France, naming the area Louisiana.
- 1682: William Penn's treaty with the Delaware begins a period of friendly relations between the Quakers and Indians.
- 1683: After the death of Louis XIV's brilliant minister, J. B. Colbert, France's interest in the colonies wanes.
- c. 1685: In North America, the English and French vie for control.
- 1685: LaSalle lands at Matagorda Bay, builds Fort St. Louis.
- 1686: Mackinac region, Rooseboom and McGregor open trade but are seized by the French.
- 1686: De Troyes and D'Iberville capture three English posts on James Bay (June–July).
- 1686: Kings James II and Louis XIV sign neutrality pact handing forts of St. John's and Port Royal back to the French.
- 1689–1697: King William's War (American counterpart of the War of the Grand Alliance in Europe) -- Abenakis, Penobscot, other New England tribes, attacked by English and their Iroquois allies. This is the first of the French-English wars for control of North America, continuing to 1763. During these wars, the Iroquois League generally sides with the English, and the Algonquian tribes with the French.
- 1689: Nicolas Perrot formally claims upper Mississippi region for France.
- 1689, 5 August: A raiding party of 1,500 Iroquois warriors kill 72 French settlers at Lachine in an event known as the Lachine massacre.

== See also ==
- Former colonies and territories in Canada
- Timeline of the European colonization of North America
- History of Canada
- List of years in Canada
