= 15th century in Canada =

Events from the 15th century in Canada.

== Events ==
- 1450 - the Iroquois form the Great League of Peace and Power.
- 1492 - Christopher Columbus (1451–1506), backed by Spain, reaches San Salvador Island (Guanahani to the natives), "discovering the New World" and encountering Arawak and Taíno people. Thinking he is in India, he calls them Indians.
- 1494 - Treaty of Tordesillas divides the colonial world between Spain and Portugal.
- 1497-98 - John and Sebastian Cabot explore east coast of North America for England. They kidnap three Mi'kmaq men.
- 1497 - Giovanni Caboto (John Cabot, 1450–98), a Venetian in English service, during a voyage underwritten by Bristol merchants, claims Newfoundland for England on June 24, laying the basis for English claims to Canada and inspiring a series of further explorations.
- 1498 - English explorer John Cabot, making a second voyage to North America (looking for Northwest Passage to India), travels the coast of Labrador, New Brunswick, Nova Scotia and trades furs with the Mi'kmaq.
- 1498-99 - Portuguese explorer João Fernandes Lavrador first sights and sails along the coasts of the Labrador Peninsula.

== See also ==
- Former colonies and territories in Canada
- List of North American settlements by year of foundation
- History of Canada
- Timeline of Canada history
- List of years in Canada
