= 1690s in Canada =

Events from the 1690s in Canada.

== Events ==
- 11 May 1690: Sent by Massachusetts, Sir William Phips captures Port Royal. Frontenac repels Phips' attack on Quebec (October). These events are part of what is sometimes called King William's War.
- 22 October 1692 - Marie-Madeleine Jarret de Verchères defends the family fort with a handful of seniors and children against the Iroquois, a true youthful hero of New France.
- 1696-97: European fur market collapses as fashion temporarily changes, leading to an increase in colonist settlers wanting permanent land to clear and farm.
- 1697: After almost a decade of guerrilla warfare, the Peace of Ryswick merely confirms the status quo, even returning Acadia, captured by the English, to the French. England and France make temporary peace in 1697 (Treaty of Ryswick). French continue to pressure Iroquois, who eventually agree to (but don't hold) neutrality in the English-French conflicts. The 1693 group of Maritimes Tribal treaties mentioned above comes from this war.

== See also ==
- Former colonies and territories in Canada
- Timeline of the European colonization of North America
- History of Canada
- List of years in Canada
