= 12th century in Canada =

Events from the 12th century in Canada.

== Events ==
- 1142 - The Iroquois Confederacy (also known as the League of Peace and Power) was formed.

== See also ==
- List of North American settlements by year of foundation
- History of Canada
- Timeline of Canada history
- List of years in Canada
- 11th century in Canada
- 13th century in Canada
