= 1st millennium in Canada =

Events from the first millennium AD in Canada.

== Events ==
- c. AD 175: Funeral offerings in graves at the Norton Mounds in Michigan are elaborate. Materials imported from great distances indicate vigorous trade.
- c. AD 500: The Thule people arrive in Alaska
- c. AD 550: In the Upper Mississippi and Great Lakes areas, Woodland peoples construct their burial mounds in the shape of birds or animals.
- c. AD 985-1014: Norsemen led by Leif Erikson, son of Erik the Red, set up outposts in North America like L'Anse aux Meadows with encounters with the Inuit, Beothuk, and Mi'kmaqs.

== See also ==
- List of North American settlements by year of foundation
- History of Canada
- Timeline of Canada history
- List of years in Canada
- Norse colonization of North America
