= 11th century in Canada =

Events from the 11th century in Canada.

== Events ==
- 985–1014: Viking explorations. Norsemen, including Erik the Red and Leif Ericson, set up outposts in North America and encounter Inuit, Beothuks and Micmacs.
- c. 1000: Thule people arrive in Nunavut.
- c. 1000: Leif (the Lucky) Ericson reaches L'Anse aux Meadows, in Newfoundland.
- c. 1000: The land that would become Canada supports 300,000 native people.
- c. 1007: Gudrid (born in Iceland around 950) gives birth to a son, Snorri Thorfinnsson, the first European child born in North America.
- c. 1014: The first European colony in North America is established at L'Anse aux Meadows, Newfoundland.

== See also ==
- List of North American settlements by year of foundation
- History of Canada
- Timeline of Canada history
- List of years in Canada
- Timeline of the European colonization of North America
- Norse colonization of North America
