= Prehistory to 1st century BC in Canada =

Events from the BCs in Canada.

== Events ==
- c. 16,500 – c. 13,500 BC: Prehistoric hunters (Paleo-Indians) migrate from Asia across the Bering strait land bridge to settle
- 8000 BC: Ice age ending. Rising waters cover Bering land bridge.
- 5200 BC: The Stó:lō people are living alongside the Fraser River near what is now Mission, B.C. (Some say they may have been as early as 9000 BC)
- 5000 BC: Native peoples have spread into what is now Northern Ontario and South-eastern Quebec.
- c. 3500 BC: In Canada's south-west Yukon, the beaver tooth gouge comes into use. It becomes an important tool for woodworking in the subarctic area.
- c. 2700 BC: Copper implements and ornaments are fashioned by the "Old Copper" culture of Wisconsin from ore found in the area around Lake Superior.
- 2000 BC: Inuit peoples begin to move into what is now the Northwest Territories.
- c. 1900 BC: The Red Paint People, who live on the banks of Maine's Penobscot River, spread red ochre over their dead and their grave offerings.
- c. 1600 BC: In Illinois, Wisconsin, Ohio, Indiana, Michigan, and Ontario, the glacial Kame peoples use the gravel ridges formed by melting glaciers for burial sites.
- c. 1400 BC: At a cemetery near Port aux Choix in Newfoundland, treasured and useful articles, as well as carved images of animals and birds, are buried with the dead.
- c. 1100 BC: Woodland hunters in eastern North America depended on the canoe in their search for game. River travel gives them access to new forest areas.
- c. 1000 BC: The Woodland tradition of eastern North America begins. This tradition is characterized by burial mounds and elaborate earthworks.
- c. 700 BC: The civilization at Poverty Point, Louisiana, is at its peak, importing materials from as far away as the Great Lakes and Appalachian Mountains areas.
- c. 500 BC: North-west Coast native peoples begin to flourish.

== See also ==
- List of years in Canada
- List of North American settlements by year of foundation
