= Newfoundland expedition (1585) =

Newfoundland Expedition (1585)
- Part of the Anglo–Spanish War
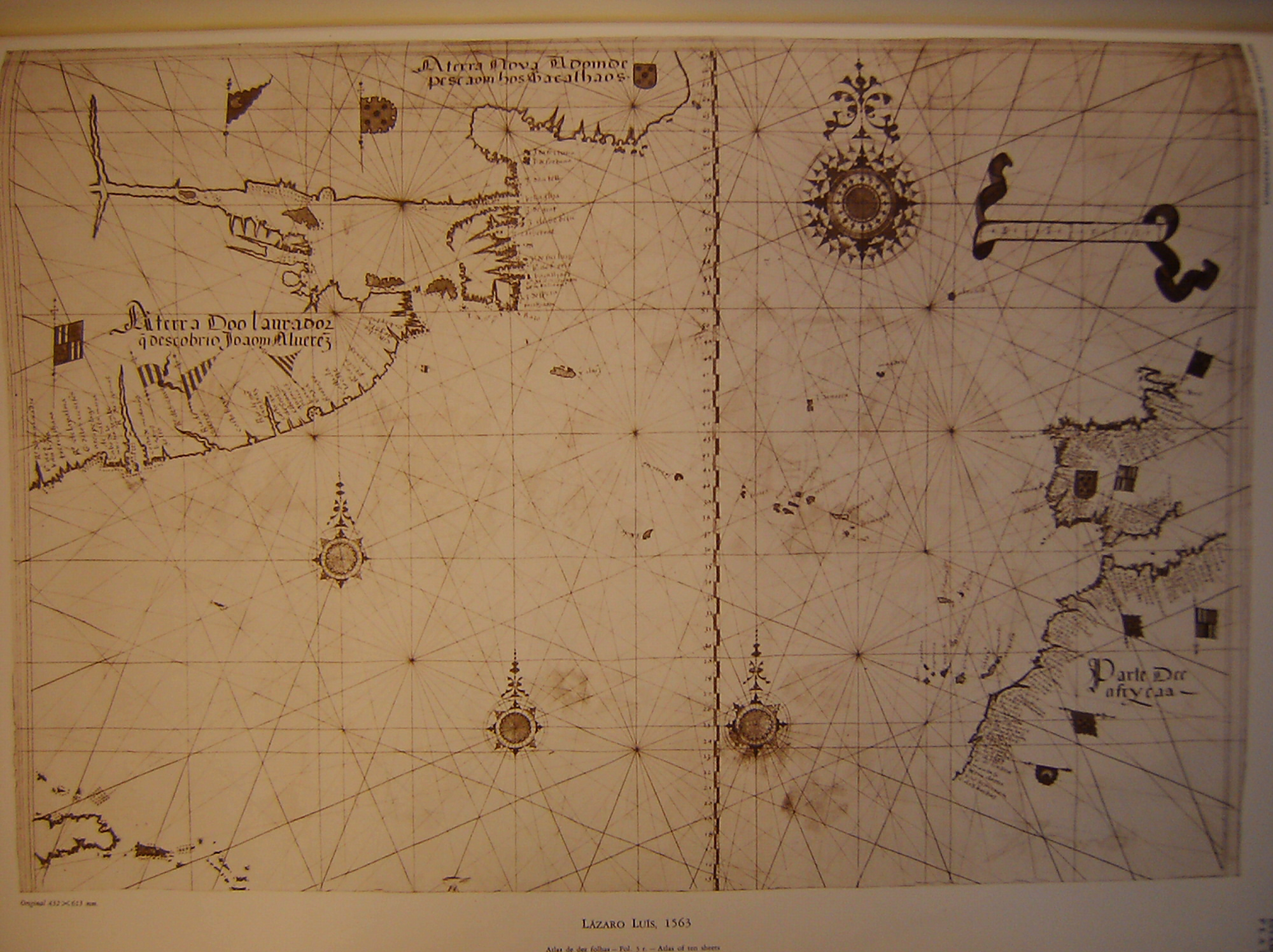
- A 1563 map of the North Atlantic with Newfoundland top center
Date	July to 10 October 1585
Location	Grand Banks of Newfoundland, Atlantic Ocean
Result	English victory

Belligerents
Spain: Portugal	England

Commanders and leaders
Unknown	Bernard Drake

Strength
Numerous Spanish & Portuguese ships	10 ships

Casualties and losses
23 ships captured, burned, or sunk ~600 prisoners	Light

The Newfoundland Expedition also known as Bernard Drake's Newfoundland Expedition was an English naval expedition that took place during the beginning of the declared Anglo-Spanish War in the North Atlantic during summer and autumn of 1585. The area of conflict was situated mainly in an area known as the Grand Banks off present day Newfoundland. The aim of the expedition was to capture the Spanish and Portuguese fishing fleets. The expedition was a huge military and financial success and virtually removed the Spanish and Portuguese from these waters. In addition the raid had large consequences in terms of English colonial expansion and settlement.

== Background ==
War had already been declared by Philip II of Spain after the Treaty of Nonsuch in which Queen Elizabeth I had offered her support to the rebellious Protestant Dutch rebels. On 26 May the Spanish enforced an embargo on English shipping in Bilbao harbour, and then all over Spain. The armed merchant ship Primrose fought her way clear and brought the news to London. English anger responded with the release of a large number of privateers in reprisal and took precautions against other merchant ships’ being caught in Spain. The Queen through Francis Walsingham at the same time had also ordered Sir Francis Drake to lead an expedition to attack the Spanish New World in a kind of preemptive strike.

Sir Humphrey Gilbert, provided with patent letters from the Queen, had landed in St John's in August 1583, and formally took possession of Newfoundland for England. Bernard Drake (distant kinsman of Sir Francis Drake), had become associated with Gilbert, through his relatives Richard Grenville and Walter Raleigh. In 1585, Drake had joined with Raleigh and Gilbert’s brother, John, in activities connected with the Roanoke Island Colony, in present-day North Carolina.

On 10 June Raleigh was authorized by the privy council to press ships for a voyage to be made to the Newfoundland fishing grounds. The expedition was to warn English fishing vessels there not to take fish direct to Spain or Portugal (trade being already well established), and to seize any vessels belonging to subjects of the king of Spain they could find. Commissions to lead such expeditions were issued to Carew Raleigh and to Bernard Drake on 20 June, and the latter was ordered about 27 June to launch an expedition against the Newfoundland fisheries. They dropped plans for a privateering voyage to the West Indies en route for Roanoke, where a colony was to be settled by Sir Richard Grenville who had left Plymouth in April.

== Drake's sweep ==
Drake left Plymouth for Newfoundland in July with a fleet of ten ships, including his flagship Golden Riall. Many of the ships were funded by investors hoping to receive a share of any plunder. The venture soon hit success with the capture of a large Portuguese ship laden with Brazilian sugar and other commodities.

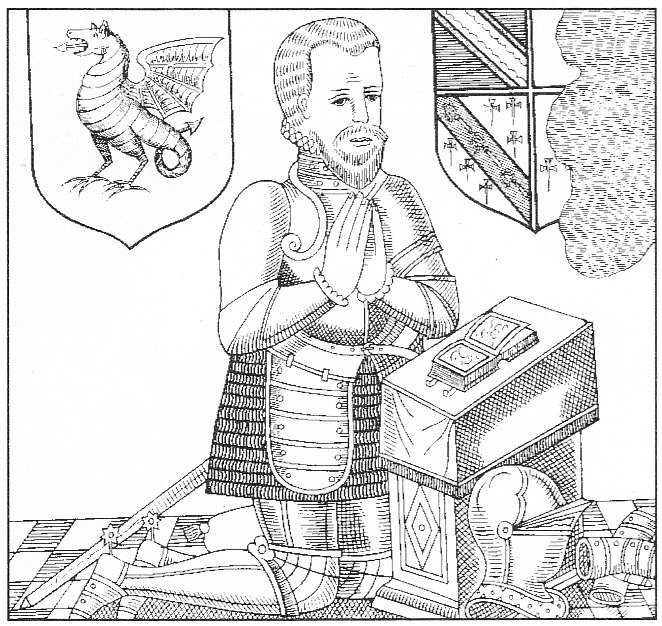
Bernard Drake

Drake arrived off Newfoundland in early mid-August, and landed at St John's, re-establishing England's claim on the country. St. John's became a base for his operations, where his ships gathered supplies and fresh water. While there, he alerted the English fishermen to the danger of heading directly to markets in Spain and Portugal. Instead of heading home, many of them joined their ranks and Drake's ships soon increased in number to ten, many of them armed. As the English then established themselves they then intercepted, captured, plundered, and even burned many Spanish and Portuguese fishing ships. A few armed flyboats protecting them met the same fate. Small in number, they were no match for the heavily armed English ships, and most either fled or were captured.

As news spread of the raid, Spanish fishing ships then tended to frequent the island’s south coast, mainly on the Avalon peninsula, away from the English area of dominance. By the end of September, Drake had cleared this area of any Spanish and Portuguese ships and then sent some of his own ships back to England escorting the prizes. His force raided a Spanish whaling and fishing base on the Burin Peninsula, capturing or burning all the stores. Other smaller locations in Placentia Bay were destroyed too. Soon the lack of prizes in the region became more apparent and Drake met up and joined forces with another of Raleigh’s associates, George Raymond in the Red Lion, who had sailed with Grenville on the way to Roanoke. Leaving Newfoundland, the force then headed to the Azores in the hope of seizing Spanish ships from the West Indies. More success followed with captures of ships with cargos of sugar, wine, and ivory, and a French ship carrying some gold. With disease starting to take its toll, Drake's ships headed home, but not before running into a storm that caused the loss of two prizes.

In all they probably took more than twenty ships, though not all reached England safely; many of the prizes were sunk in storms, burned, or destroyed in battle.

== Aftermath ==
The voyage was both successful and profitable, in addition the result of depriving the Spanish navy and merchant marine of 60,000 quintals or 3,000 tons of the dried fish so important to the victualling of ocean-going ships. In all 600 Spanish and Portuguese prisoners were taken and many were taken back to England to be interned in retaliation for the Spanish doing the same to English ships in Spain. Estimates of the value of the prizes vary but the voyage likely returned a profit of at least 600 per cent. As their share, Drake and his eldest son, John, were given four of the most valuable ships by Raleigh and Sir John Gilbert.

On 9 January 1586, Drake was knighted by Elizabeth at Greenwich in recognition of his success. A couple of months later, the surviving Portuguese prisoners, whom Drake had had imprisoned in Exeter, were put on trial, the charge perhaps being mutiny. The trial during the notorious Black Assize of Exeter from 14 March 1586 was held at Exeter Castle. Within little more than three weeks, many of the men of the trial succumbed to disease, as they had been exposed to the Portuguese prisoners, who also succumbed. Bernard Drake died too in Crediton on 10 April 1586, and was buried two days later while his son John inherited the profits of the Newfoundland voyage.

=== Consequences ===
In a precautionary move, the following year, the Spanish government forbade ships to sail to Newfoundland. In the aftermath of the Spanish Armada however, which resulted in the loss of many ships and with increased English activity over the next century, Spanish activity heavily waned. Drake's raid had thus done serious and lasting damage to the Spanish and Portuguese fishing industries. The Portuguese fishery in particular never recovered. As a result of Drake's huge success and the impact it had, this enabled the establishment of English and French (Basque) domination in North America and therefore colonial settlement in the early part of the 17th century.

== Bibliography ==
- Andrews, Kenneth R (1964). Elizabethan Privateering: English Privateering During the Spanish War, 1585-1603. Cambridge University Press, First Edition. ISBN 978-0521040327.
- Bicheno, Hugh (2012). Elizabeth's Sea Dogs: How England's Mariners Became the Scourge of the Seas. Conway. ISBN 978-1844861743.
- Cell, Gillian T (1969). English Enterprise in Newfoundland 1577-1660. University of Toronto Press. ISBN 9780802052322.
- Chartrand, René (2011). The Forts of Colonial North America: British, Dutch and Swedish Colonies Volume 101 of Fortress Series. Osprey Publishing. ISBN 9781849081979.
- Childs, David (2014). Pirate Nation: Elizabeth I and her Royal Sea Rovers. Seaforth Publishing. ISBN 9781848321908.
- Clarke, Eliot (2003). Land of the Free and Home of the Brave. Dorrance Publishing Co, Inc. ISBN 9780805960563.
- Davies, K. G (1974). The North Atlantic World in the Seventeenth Century Volume 4 of Europe and the World in Age of Expansion. University of Minnesota Press. ISBN 9780816607792.
- Hart, Jonathan (2014). Empires and Colonies Themes in History. John Wiley & Sons. ISBN 9780745655185.
- Hornsby, Stephen (2005). British Atlantic, American Frontier: Spaces of Power in Early Modern British America. UPNE. ISBN 9781584654278.
- Holy, Norman (2009). Deserted Ocean: A Social History of Depletion. AuthorHouse. ISBN 9781438964942.
- Konstam, Angus (2008). The Complete History General Military Series. Osprey Publishing. ISBN 9781846032400.
- Loker, Aleck (2006). Walter Ralegh's Virginia: Roanoke Island and the Lost Colony. Aleck Loker. ISBN 9781928874089.
- McDermott, James (2005). England and the Spanish Armada: The Necessary Quarrel. Yale University Press. ISBN 9780300106985.
- Naylor, R.T (2006). Canada in the European Age, 1453-1919. McGill-Queen's Press. ISBN 9780773583610.
- Pope, Peter Edward (2004). Fish Into Wine: The Newfoundland Plantation in the Seventeenth Century. Omohundro Institute of Early American History & Culture UNC Press Books. ISBN 9780807829103.
- Prowse, D. W (2007). A History of Newfoundland from the English, Colonial and Foreign Record. Heritage Books. ISBN 9780788423109.
- Quinn, David B (1985). Set Fair for Roanoke: Voyages and Colonies, 1584-1606. UNC Press Books. ISBN 9780807841235.
- Rowse, A. L (2003). The Expansion of Elizabethan England. Univ of Wisconsin Press. ISBN 9780299188245.
