= Former colonies and territories in Canada =

A number of states and polities formerly claimed colonies and territories in Canada prior to the evolution of the current provinces and territories under the federal system. North America prior to colonization was occupied by a variety of Indigenous groups consisting of band societies typical of the sparsely populated North, to loose confederacies made up of numerous hunting bands from a variety of ethnic groups (Plains region), to more structured confederacies of sedentary farming villages (Great Lakes region), to stratified hereditary structures centred on a fishing economy (Plateau and Pacific Coast regions). The colonization of Canada by Europeans began in the 10th century, when Norsemen explored and, ultimately unsuccessfully, attempted to settle areas of the northeastern fringes of North America. Early permanent European settlements in what is now Canada included the late 16th and 17th century French colonies of Acadia and Canada (New France), the English colonies of Newfoundland and Rupert's Land, the Scottish colonies of Nova Scotia and Port Royal.

France lost nearly all of its colonies in North America in 1763 after the Seven Years' War to the British Empire. Britain's imperial government over a century later then ceded the land to Canadian control in 1867 after confederation. Since then, Canada's external borders have changed several times, and had grown from four initial provinces to ten provinces and three territories by 1999.

== Indigenous societies ==
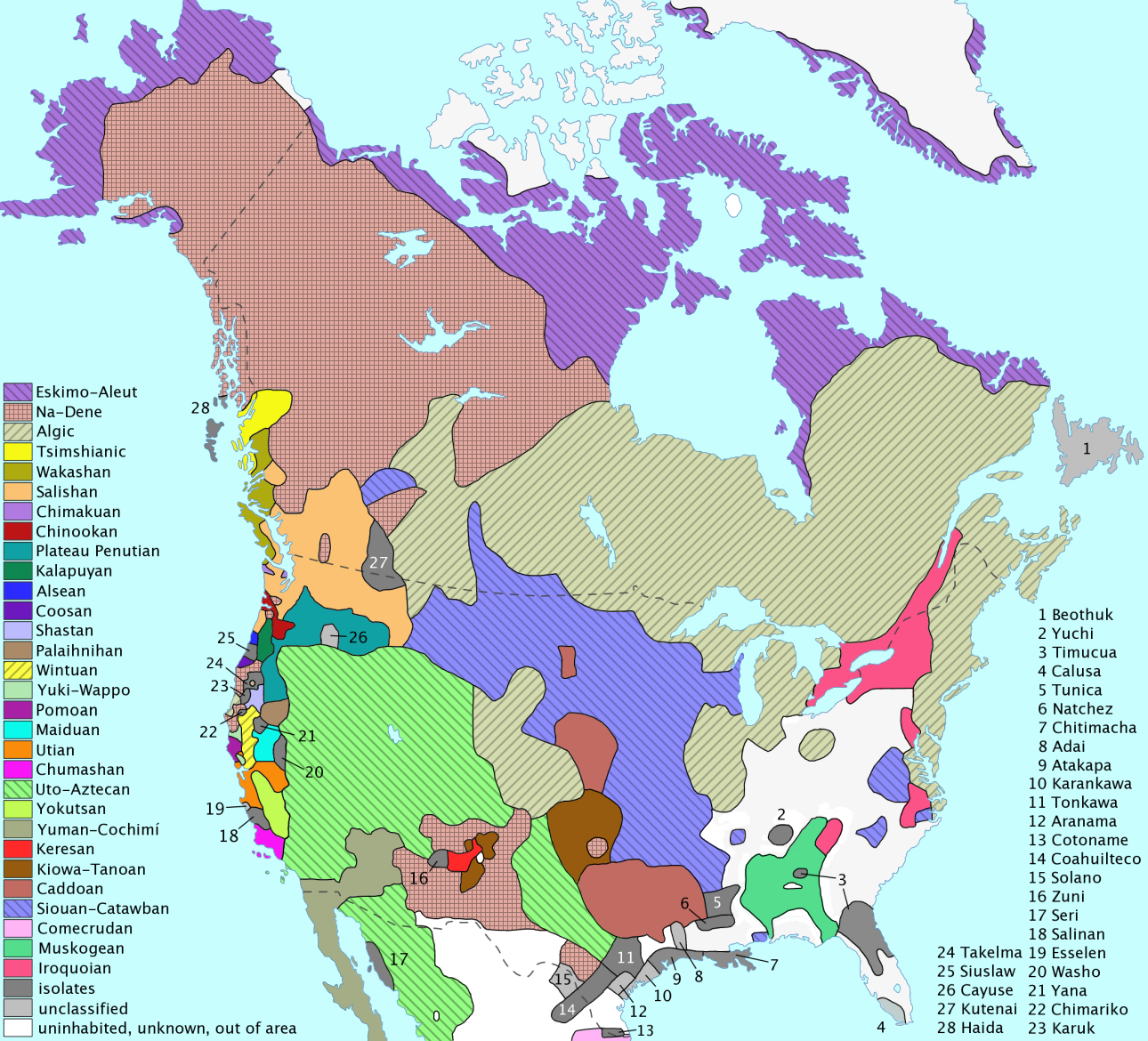
Pre-Columbian distribution of North American language families

Indigenous peoples in what is now Canada did not form state societies and, in the absence of state structures, academics usually classify indigenous people by their traditional "lifeway" (or primary economic activity) and ecological/climatic region into "culture areas", or by their language families.

The Mi'kmaq in today's Maritimes were governed as seven separate "districts" with their own district chiefs and councils coordinated by the Grand Council meeting yearly on Cape Breton Island. Following their first conflict with the British invaders (King Philip's War) in 1677, the Mi'kmaq joined the wider Wabanaki Confederacy, an alliance with four other Algonquian-language nations: the Abenaki, Penobscot, Passamaquoddy, and Maliseet. (Note: The allied tribes occupied the territory which the French named Acadia. The tribes ranged from present-day northern and eastern New England in the United States to the Maritime Provinces of Canada. At the time of contact with the French (late 16th century), they were expanding from their maritime base westward along the Gaspé Peninsula/St. Lawrence River at the expense of Iroquoian-speaking tribes. The Míkmaq name for this peninsula was Kespek (meaning "last-acquired").) To the west around the Great Lakes, the Council of Three Fires was formed in 796 AD between the Ojibwa, Odawa and the Potawatomi, according to oral history. The five (later six) tribes of the Iroquois Confederacy were united in 1142 AD, according to their oral traditions. There were also the four or possibly five tribes of the Huron Confederacy, both in the Great Lakes region.

The Blackfoot Confederacy in present-day Alberta and neighbouring Montana originally consisted of three dialect groups of the same language (Peigan, Kainai, and Siksika) (Note: They can each be called "tribes" but the Blackfoot as a whole are also referred to as a "tribe" reflecting the inconsistent usage of that term.) but they were later joined the completely unrelated Sarcee people. The Iron Confederacy of present-day Alberta and Saskatchewan consisted of numerous bands of mixed Plains Cree, Assiniboine, and Saulteaux people.

The Indigenous peoples of the Pacific Northwest Coast and peoples of the Northwest Plateau developed highly structured cultures from relatively dense populations. Some cultures in this region were very similar and share certain elements, such as the importance of fishing to their communities.

- Arctic cultural area – (Eskimo–Aleut languages)
- Subarctic culture area – (Na-Dene languages and Algic languages)
- Eastern Woodlands (Northeast) cultural area – (Algic languages and Iroquoian languages)
- Plains cultural area – (Algic languages, Na-Dene languages, Siouan–Catawban languages)
- Northwest Plateau cultural area – (Salishan languages and Kutenai language)
- Northwest Coast cultural area – (Penutian languages, Tsimshianic languages and Wakashan languages)

== European colonization ==
Former European colonies and territories in Canada range from areas that were once under French and British control to territories that were formally part of the British Empire. The French controlled New France, a region around the Great Lakes Waterway, Mississippi River System and parts of the Maritime Provinces of New Brunswick, Nova Scotia, and Prince Edward Island, until the Treaty of Paris in 1763 when it was ceded to the British. Modern day Manitoba, Saskatchewan, and Alberta were part of Rupert's Land and the North-Western Territory, which were controlled by the Hudson's Bay Company before becoming part of the Canadian Confederation in 1870. Newfoundland and Labrador was once a British colony before joining the Canadian Confederation in 1949. After the Oregon boundary dispute between the UK and US government was resolved in 1846, the colonies of Vancouver Island and colony of British Columbia were established; the former in 1849 and the latter in 1858. The two colonies were merged to form a single colony in 1866, which later joined the Canadian Confederation on 20 July 1871.

=== Norse settlement ===
While the Norse colonies in Greenland lasted for almost 500 years, the continental North American settlements were small and did not develop into permanent colonies. Vinland, Markland and Helluland are the names given to three lands, possibly in Canada, discovered by Norsemen as described in the Eiríks saga rauða and Grœnlendinga saga.

- L'Anse aux Meadows – settlement (carbon dating estimate 990–1050)

=== Portuguese claims ===
Based on the Treaty of Tordesillas the Portuguese Crown claimed it had territorial rights in the Atlantic waters visited by explorer John Cabot in 1497 and 1498. In 1498 to 1500, the Portuguese mariner João Fernandes Lavrador visited the north Atlantic coast, accounting for the appearance of the name "Labrador" on topographical maps of the period. In 1501 and 1502, Miguel and Gaspar Corte-Real explored present day Newfoundland, claiming the land in the name of Portuguese Empire. The extent and nature of Portuguese activity on the Canadian mainland during the 16th century remains unclear and controversial, but it is generally accepted that explorer Joao Álvarez Fagundes attempted to establish a seasonal fishing colony. It is not known exactly where and for how long the fishing post existed, Nevertheless both the Portuguese and Spanish fishing industry in the area was destroyed in 1585 by an English expedition led by Bernard Drake, and never recovered.

=== New France ===
Map of North America in 1750, before the French and Indian War, the North American theatre of the worldwide conflict known as the Seven Years' War (1756 to 1763), showing possessions of Britain (pink and purple), France (blue), and Spain (orange).

In 1534, Jacques Cartier planted a cross in the Gaspé Peninsula and claimed the land in the name of Francis I of France. In 1600, a trading post was established at Tadoussac, but only five of the sixteen settlers survived the winter and returned home that summer. In 1604, the first year-round permanent settlement was founded by Samuel de Champlain at Île-Saint-Croix on Baie Française (Bay of Fundy), which was moved to Port-Royal in 1605. In 1608, Samuel de Champlain founded the city of Québec with 28 men of whom 20 died from lack of food and from scurvy the first winter.

- New France – (1534–1763) – List of French forts in North America
  - Acadie – (1604–1713)
  - Canada (New France) – (1608–1763)
  - Terre Neuve (Newfoundland) – (1610–1713)
  - Île Royale (Cape Breton)—(1713–1763)
  - Isle Saint-Jean (P.E.I.) – (1713–1763)
  - Pays d'en Haut (1639–1763)
  - Illinois Country (1673–1717)

=== British North America ===
British colonization of the Americas (including colonization sponsored by both the Kingdom of England and Kingdom of Scotland before the 1707 Acts of Union which created the Kingdom of Great Britain) began in the late 16th century and reached its peak when colonies had been established throughout the Americas. The Kingdom of Great Britain acquired the French colony of Acadia in 1713 and then Canada, New France.

The United Kingdom also claimed the west coast of North America: indirectly via (from 1804) the North West Company and (after 1821) Hudson's Bay Company licenses west of the Rocky Mountains, the Columbia and New Caledonia fur districts, most of which were jointly claimed by the United States, which called it the Oregon Country, from 1818 until the 49th parallel as the international boundary was extended west of the Rockies by the Oregon Treaty of 1846. The Colony of Vancouver Island, founded in 1849, and the Colony of British Columbia, founded in 1858, were combined in 1866 with the name Colony of British Columbia until joining Confederation in 1871. British Columbia also was expanded with the addition what had been the Colony of the Queen Charlotte Islands and also most of the Stikine Territory in 1863 and, upon joining Confederation, with the addition of the Peace River Country, formerly part of the Northwest Territories.

Animated map of North America's territorial evolution from 1750 to 2008 — in the interactive SVG version on a compatible browser, hover over the timeline to step through time

- British America (Colonial America) – (1583–1783)
  - St. John's, Newfoundland (from 1583, English)
  - British Arctic Territories — (from 16th century)
  - Cuper's Cove, Newfoundland — (from 1610, English)
  - Avalon, Newfoundland — (from 1610, English)
  - Renews, Newfoundland – (from 1615, English)
  - Bristol's Hope, Newfoundland — (from 1618, English)
  - Nova Scotia – (1621–2, Scottish)
  - Cape Breton – (1625, Scottish)
  - Saint John, New Brunswick (from 1631, English)
  - Port Royal Colony – (1629–1632, Scottish)
  - Rupert's Land – (from 1670)
  - Nova Scotia – (from 1710)
  - Prince Edward Island – (from 1763)
  - Cape Breton – (from 1763)
  - Province of Quebec – (from 1763)
- British North America – (1783–1907)
  - North-Western Territory – (1783–1870)
  - New Brunswick – (1784–1867)
  - The Canadas (Lower Canada and Upper Canada) – (1791–1841)
  - Columbia District (also referred to as Oregon Country) – (1793–1846)
  - New Caledonia – (1808–1858)
  - Red River Colony – (1811–1870)
  - Province of Canada – (1841–1867)
  - Colony of Vancouver Island – (1849–1866)
  - Colony of the Queen Charlotte Islands – (1853–1858)
  - Colony of British Columbia, a.k.a. the Mainland Colony – (1858–1866)
  - Stickeen Territories – (1862)
  - Colony of British Columbia – (1866–1871)
- Dominion of Newfoundland – (1907–1949)

– List of Hudson's Bay Company trading posts

=== New Spain ===
Spanish colonizers had originally taken the lead in the Pacific Northwest coast, with the voyages of Juan José Pérez Hernández in 1774 and 1775. This was in response to intelligence that the Russians had begun to explore the Pacific Coast of North America, which the Spanish considered part of New Spain.

- Santa Cruz de Nuca and Fort San Miguel at Nootka Sound – (1789–1795) The first colony in British Columbia and the only Spanish settlement in what is now Canada.

=== Russian America ===
In 1799, Tsar Paul I proclaimed Russian title and established the Russian American Company's trade monopoly and rule in the North Pacific through the creation of Russian America. The stated southward limit of Russian claims was 51 degrees north latitude, roughly that of Cape Scott at the northern tip of Vancouver Island. Though no Russian settlements were established in what is now British Columbia, Russian trade and scientific expeditions frequented the North Coast. Intense tripartite negotiation led to treaties between Russia with the U.S. and Britain in 1824 and 1825, respectively, setting the new southward limit of Russian territories at 54 degrees, 40 minutes north latitude, corresponding with Cape Muzon at the southern tip of Dall Island, at the extreme southwest of what is today the Alaska Panhandle.

=== Dutch claims ===
Established in 1614 by the Dutch West India Company, the colony of New Netherland covered most of what is now New York State. It was created to give the Dutch access to the North American fur trade, and was governed from New Amsterdam (now New York City). The territory officially claimed by the Dutch extended as far north as the St. Lawrence River, placing much of their territory in modern-day Quebec. Despite the fact that no settlements were established in the area of Quebec, it was still officially part of New Netherland and thus a part of the Dutch Empire. In addition to that, during the Franco-Dutch wars of the 1670s, the Dutch captured several forts in Acadia, proclaiming the territory New Holland. There was no extensive settlement in the area, but the Dutch claims persisted for a few years at the least.

== Canadian territorial evolution ==
Animation of the evolution of the borders and names of Canada's provinces and territories

Canada became a semi-independent federated grouping of provinces and a dominion after the Constitution Act, 1867 (formerly called the British North America Act 1867). Originally three provinces of British North America, New Brunswick, Nova Scotia and the Province of Canada (which would become Ontario and Quebec) united to form the new nation. Full independence came with the Statute of Westminster 1931 and the Canada Act 1982. Since 1867, Canada's external borders have changed several times, and had grown from four initial provinces to ten provinces and three territories by 1999. Territorial evolution included the use of Numbered Treaties.

- North-West Territories – (1870–1906)
- District of Keewatin – (1876–1905)
- Yukon Territory – (1898–2003)

=== Alaska boundary dispute ===
The Alaska boundary dispute, simmering since the Alaska Purchase of 1867, became critical when gold was discovered in Yukon during the late 1890s and Canada wanted its own Pacific port connected to the gold fields. Canada argued its historic boundary with Russian America included the Lynn Canal and the port of Skagway, both occupied by the U.S., while the U.S. claimed the Atlin District and the lower Stikine and even Whitehorse. The dispute went to arbitration in 1903, with the American claims largely upheld as the British delegate sided with the Americans to preserve the British interest in a close relationship with the U.S.

=== Norwegian claim ===
Otto Sverdrup, a Norwegian explorer, claimed the Sverdrup Islands for Norway in 1902 but the Norwegian government showed no interest in pursuing the claim until 1928. On 11 November 1930 (Remembrance Day) after formal Canadian intervention, Norway recognized Canada's sovereignty over the islands.

- Sverdrup Islands – (1902–1930)

=== Danish claim ===
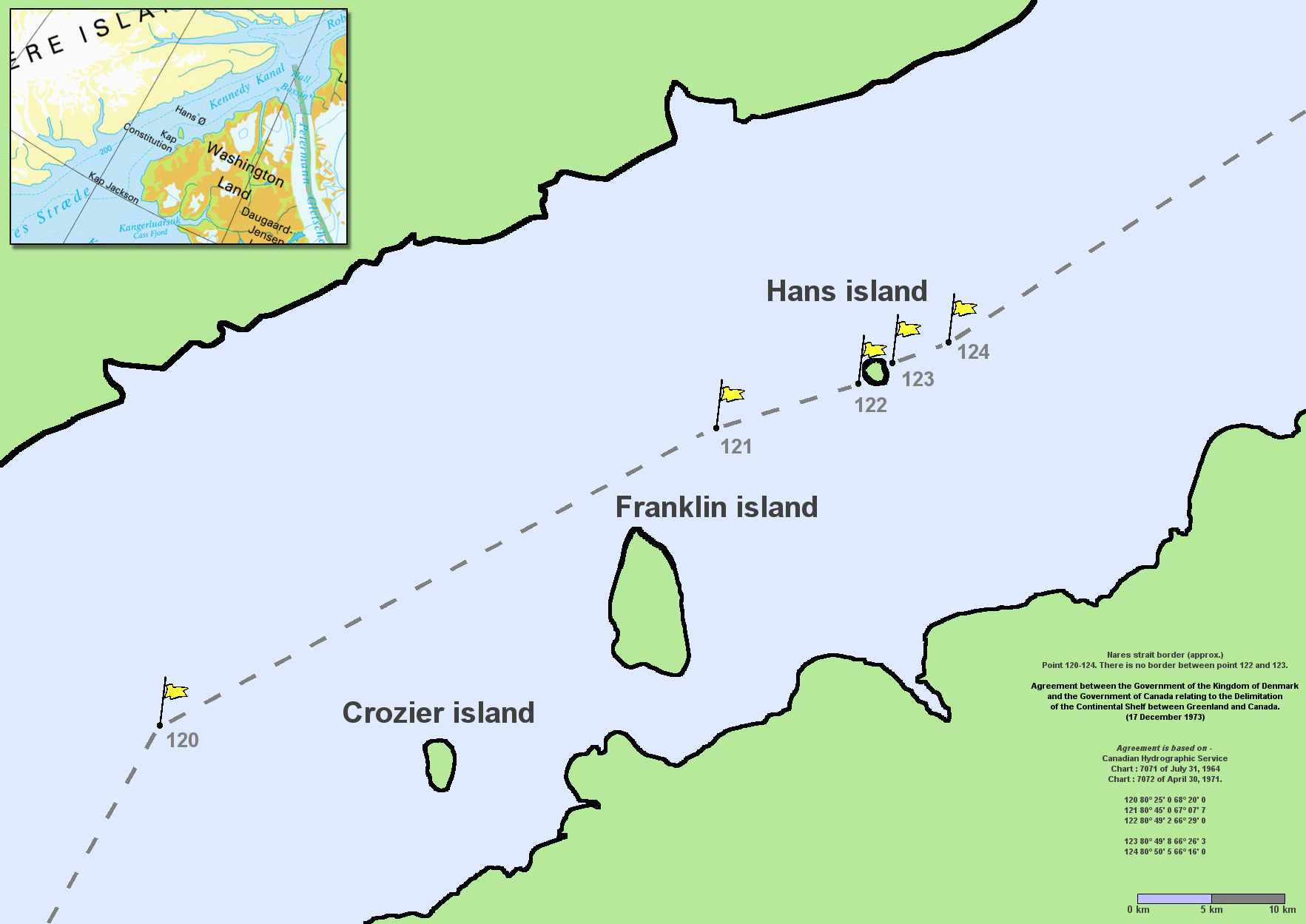
Map showing the 1973 agreed delimitation of the Continental Shelf between Greenland and Canada as defined by the Canadian Hydrographic Service

Hans Island is the smallest of three islands located in Kennedy Channel; the others are Franklin Island and Crozier Island. The island is the traditional hunting grounds of the Inuit and is claimed by both Canada and Denmark. In 2007, updates of satellite photos led Canada to recognize the international border as crossing through the middle of Hans Island, not to the east of the island as previously claimed.

- Hans Island – (1933–2022)

=== Northwest Passage ===
The Canadian government considers the Northwestern Passages part of Canadian Internal Waters, but the United States and various European countries maintain they are an international strait or transit passage, allowing free and unencumbered passage.

=== Areas disputed by the United States ===
Although Canada and the United States share the longest non-militarized border between two countries, there is a long history of disputes about the border's demarcation.

=== Proposed provinces and territories ===
Since Confederation in 1867, there have been several proposals for new Canadian provinces and territories. The Constitution of Canada requires an amendment for the creation of a new province but the creation of a new territory requires only an act of Parliament; therefore, it is easier legislatively to create a territory than a province.

== See also ==
- Beaumont-Hamel Newfoundland Memorial – Newfoundland purchased the ground in 1921
- Canadian National Vimy Memorial – considered on Canadian territory since 1922
- List of Canadian monarchs
- List of North American cities by year of foundation
- Timeline of the European colonization of North America
- French colonization of the Americas
