= List of North American settlements by year of foundation =

This is a list of settlements in North America by founding year, historical entity and present-day country.

Year	Settlement	Historical entity	Subdivision	Country	Notes
1500 BC	Tepoztlán		Morelos	Mexico	
1500 BC	San José Mogote		Oaxaca	Mexico	
1500 BC	Chalcatzingo		Morelos	Mexico	
1500 BC	Calixtlahuaca		Mexico	Mexico	
1500 BC	Kaminaljuyu	Preclassic Maya	Guatemala	Guatemala	
1400 BC	Teopantecuanitlan		Guerrero	Mexico	
1400 BC	Nakbe	Preclassic Maya	Petén	Guatemala	
1200 BC	San Lorenzo Tenochtitlán	Olmecs	Veracruz	Mexico	
1200 BC	La Venta	Olmecs	Veracruz	Mexico	
1150 BC	Etlatongo		Oaxaca	Mexico	
1000 BC	Xochitecatl		Tlaxcala	Mexico	
1000 BC	Cuicuilco		Tlalpan	Mexico	
1000 BC	Tres Zapotes	Olmecs	Veracruz	Mexico	
950 BC	Takalik Abaj	Preclassic Maya/Olmecs	Retalhuleu	Guatemala	
950 BC	El Mirador	Preclassic Maya	Petén	Guatemala	
950 BC	Uaxactun	Preclassic Maya	Petén	Guatemala	
800 BC	Zazacatla	Olmecs	Morelos	Mexico	
700 BC	Ticul	Preclassic Maya	Yucatán	Mexico	
600 BC	Tikal	Preclassic Maya	Petén	Guatemala	
500 BC	Monte Albán	Zapotec civilization	Oaxaca	Mexico	
500 BC	Cholula		Puebla	Mexico	Possibly the oldest continuously inhabited settlement in the Americas
400 BC	Tula		Hidalgo	Mexico	
300 BC	Teotihuacan		México	Mexico	In the Valley of Mexico
200	Mitla	Zapotec civilization	Oaxaca	Mexico	
600	Cantona		Puebla	Mexico	
650	Cahokia		Illinois	United States	
874	Reykjavík	Norway	Capital Region	Iceland	First European settlement in the Americas. Founding is given as 874 CE by Ingólfr Arnarson in the Landnámabók. Reykjavík is located west of the Mid-Atlantic Ridge on the American plate.
985?	Eastern Settlement	Norway	Greenland	Denmark	Norse explorer Erik the Red established this settlement, followed by the Western Settlement c. 985.
1000	L'Anse aux Meadows	Icelandic Commonwealth	Newfoundland and Labrador	Canada	First European settlement in the New World. Norse explorer Leif Ericson established a settlement on this site in 1003.
1050	Motul	League of Mayapan	Yucatán	Mexico	
1054	Antiguo Cuscatlan	Toltec Empire	La Libertad	El Salvador	
1100	Oraibi	Pueblo II period	Arizona	United States	
1144	Acoma Pueblo	Pueblo III period	New Mexico	United States	Oldest continuously occupied community in the US, known today as Sky City
1325	Tenochtitlan	Aztec Empire	Distrito Federal	Mexico	Present-day Mexico City
1493	La Isabela	Viceroyalty of the Indies	Puerto Plata	Dominican Republic	First European settlement in the New World during the Age of Discovery. Abandoned by 1500.
1494	Concepción de la Vega	Viceroyalty of the Indies	La Vega	Dominican Republic	Founded by Christopher Columbus in 1494 as a gold town, and abandoned by 1562 after an earthquake destroyed the settlement.
1496	Santo Domingo	Viceroyalty of the Indies	Distrito Nacional	Dominican Republic	Oldest continuously inhabited European-established settlement in the Americas. Present-day capital of the Dominican Republic.
1497	St. John's	British America	Newfoundland and Labrador	Canada	Oldest English-founded city in North America, seasonal until c. 1630
1508	Caparra	Viceroyalty of the Indies	Puerto Rico	United States	
1509	Sevilla la Nueva	Viceroyalty of the Indies	Seville, St. Ann's Bay	Jamaica	Established by Juan de Esquivel, the first Spanish governor of Jamaica, St Ann's Bay was the third capital established by Spain in the Americas.
1510	Nombre de Dios	Viceroyalty of the Indies	Colón	Panama	Oldest continuously inhabited European-established settlement in Panama and the continental Americas
1511	Baracoa	Viceroyalty of the Indies	Guantánamo	Cuba	Oldest continuously inhabited European-established settlement in Cuba, and its former capital
1513	Bayamo	Viceroyalty of the Indies	Granma	Cuba	Capital of Cuba in 1513
1514	Santiago	Viceroyalty of the Indies	Santiago	Cuba	
1515	Havana	Viceroyalty of the Indies	Havana	Cuba	Present-day capital of Cuba
1519	La Villa Rica de la Vera Cruz	Viceroyalty of the Indies	Veracruz	Mexico	Oldest continuously inhabited European-established settlement in Mexico
1519	Panama City	Viceroyalty of the Indies	Panamá	Panama	First European city on the Pacific coast of the Americas
1521	San Juan	Viceroyalty of the Indies	Puerto Rico	United States	Oldest continuously inhabited European-established settlement in the contiguous United States or U.S. territories
1524	Quetzaltenango	Viceroyalty of the Indies	Guatemala	Guatemala	
1525	San Salvador	Viceroyalty of the Indies	San Salvador Department	El Salvador	Diego de Holguín became the first mayor of San Salvador after the town was founded on April 1, 1525. Founded on what is now the archaeological site of Ciudad Vieja, north of the present-day city, it was moved to the Valle de Las Hamacas (Acelhuate Valley).
1524	Granada	Viceroyalty of the Indies	Granada	Nicaragua	Oldest continuously inhabited European-established settlement in Nicaragua
1526	Acámbaro	Viceroyalty of the Indies	Guanajuato	Mexico	
1526	San Miguel de Gualdape	Viceroyalty of the Indies	South Carolina, then Georgia	United States	First European settlement in the contiguous U.S., abandoned after three months
1531	Mazatlán	Viceroyalty of the Indies	Sinaloa	Mexico	
1531	Puebla City	Viceroyalty of the Indies	Puebla	Mexico	
1531	Culiacán	Viceroyalty of the Indies	Sinaloa	Mexico	
1531	Querétaro City	Viceroyalty of the Indies	Querétaro	Mexico	
1532	Oaxaca	Viceroyalty of the Indies	Oaxaca	Mexico	
1534	Villa de la Vega	Viceroyalty of the Indies	Saint Catherine Parish	Jamaica	After founding Seville in 1509, Spanish settlers moved to a healthier site which they named Villa de la Vega. The English renamed it Spanish Town when they conquered the island in 1655.
1536	San Pedro Sula	New Spain	Cortés	Honduras	
1539	Zuni Pueblo	New Spain	New Mexico	United States	Ferguson, T.J. (1985). A Zuni Atlas. Norman, OK: University of Oklahoma Press
1540	Compostela	New Spain	Nayarit	Mexico	Known as Capital de la Nueva Galicia Compostela (1548–1560)
1540	Childersburg		Alabama	United States	Possibly the oldest still-occupied village in eastern North America, established by Native Americans
1540	Campeche	New Spain	Campeche	Mexico	
1540	Taos Pueblo	Viceroyalty of the Indies	New Mexico	United States	One of the oldest continuously inhabited Native American settlements in the United States
1541	Morelia	New Spain	Michoacán	Mexico	Known as Valladolid until 1828
1541	Charlesbourg-Royal	New France	Quebec	Canada	First French settlement; short-lived
1542	Yuriria	New Spain	Guanajuato	Mexico	
1542	Mérida	New Spain	Yucatán	Mexico	Founded by Francisco de Montejo on the ruins of the Maya city of T'ho
1542	Guadalajara	New Spain	Jalisco	Mexico	
1542	San Miguel de Allende	New Spain	Guanajuato	Mexico	
1543	Santiago de los Caballeros de Guatemala (Antigua Guatemala)	New Spain	Guatemala	Guatemala	
1544	Ejutla	New Spain	Jalisco	Mexico	
1550	Acapulco	New Spain	Guerrero	Mexico	Discovered by Cortés in 1531; settled in 1550.
1559	Pensacola	New Spain	Florida	United States	Spanish explorer Tristán de Luna founded a short-lived settlement in 1559.
1560	Port of Spain	New Spain	Port of Spain	Trinidad And Tobago	A Spanish garrison was posted near the foot of the Laventille Hills, which today form the city's eastern boundary.
1563	Cartago	New Spain	Cartago	Costa Rica	Oldest continuously inhabited European-established settlement in Costa Rica
1563	Villa de Durango	New Spain	Durango	Mexico	Capital of the Nueva Vizcaya province of Villa New Spain
1564	Fort Caroline	New France	Florida	United States	A permanent settlement of 200 soldiers and artisans led by René Goulaine de Laudonnière, who had accompanied Ribault on a previous expedition. With help from the Timucua Indians, the colonists began building a village and fort on the river's south bank and named the area La Caroline after Charles IX of France.
1564	Villa Hermosa de San Juan Bautista	New Spain	Tabasco	México	Founded on June 24, 1564 (the feast of San Juan Bautista, hence its original name) by Diego de Quijada
1565	Saint Augustine	New Spain	Florida	United States	Oldest continuously inhabited European-established settlement in the contiguous U.S. San Agustín/St. Augustine was founded by Pedro Menéndez de Avilés.
1566	Saint Marys	New Spain	Georgia	United States	Second-oldest continuously inhabited European-established settlement in the contiguous U.S.; on the St. Mary's River
1573	San Germán	New Spain	Puerto Rico	United States	
1575	Saltillo	New Spain	Coahuila	Mexico	Oldest post-conquest settlement in northern Mexico
1575	Aguascalientes	New Spain	Aguascalientes	Mexico	
1576	León	New Spain	Guanajuato	Mexico	
1583	Harbour Grace	British America	Newfoundland and Labrador	Canada	First permanent English settlement in North America
1585	Roanoke Colony	British America	North Carolina	United States	Settlers were left on the island on August 17, 1585.
1587-1623	Mantle Site	British America	Ontario	Canada	Massive late Woodland Huron-Wendat village site, with trade links reaching as far as Newfoundland.
1596	Monterrey	New Spain	Nuevo León	Mexico	
1597	Portobelo	New Spain	Colón	Panama	
1598	Parras	New Spain	Coahuila	Mexico	
1598	Española	New Spain	New Mexico	United States	First European-founded capital of the "New World" in the United States, established by Juan de Oñate.
1598	San Juan de los Caballeros	New Spain	New Mexico	United States	With Española, the oldest European-founded settlement in the southwestern United States
1599	Tadoussac	New France	Quebec	Canada	Oldest continuously inhabited French-established settlement in the Americas, and the oldest European-established settlement in Quebec
1603	Salamanca	New Spain	Guanajuato	Mexico	
1604	Saint John	New France	New Brunswick	Canada	Founded as Saint-Jean in 1604 by the French explorer Samuel de Champlain.
1604	Canso	New France	Nova Scotia	Canada	Founded in 1604 by the French as Canseau, settled in 1518 by European fur traders and fishermen. Canso and the surrounding islands were involved in the French and English struggles to control the area.
1604	L'Île-aux-Marins	New France	Saint Pierre and Miquelon	France	Settled in 1604 by French fishermen. Today, the island is still French and is only inhabited during the summer.
1604	Saint Croix Island	New France	Maine	United States	Established in the summer of 1604 by a French expedition, led by Pierre Dugua, which included Samuel de Champlain. After the winter of 1604–1605 the survivors relocated and founded Port-Royal, Nova Scotia.
1605	Port Royal	New France	Nova Scotia	Canada	Established in the summer of 1605 by French colonizing explorers Pierre Dugua de Monts and Samuel de Champlain, who established Quebec City in 1608.
1607	Jamestown	British America	Virginia	United States	Oldest permanent European settlement in the Thirteen Colonies
1607	Popham Colony	British America	Maine	United States	Short-lived settlement, a Plymouth Company project
1607	Santa Fe	New Spain	New Mexico	United States	Oldest continuously inhabited state capital in the US
1608	Québec	New France	Quebec	Canada	Originally settled by Jacques Cartier in 1535, who abandoned it in 1536. He returned in 1541, but abandoned the site again. Samuel de Champlain established a permanent settlement on July 3–4, 1608. Only completely-garrison-walled city north of Mexico
1610	Cupids	British America	Newfoundland and Labrador	Canada	Oldest continuously occupied English settlement in Canada
1610	Hampton	British America	Virginia	United States	Oldest continuously occupied English settlement in the United States
1610	Kecoughtan	British America	Virginia	United States	
1611	Henricus	British America	Virginia	United States	
1612	St. George's	British America	St. George	Bermuda	Oldest continuously inhabited European-established settlement in Bermuda
1613	Newport News, Virginia	British America	Virginia	United States	
1614	Albany	New Netherland	New York	United States	Oldest European settlement in New York State, founded as Fort Nassau and renamed Fort Orange in 1623. First Dutch settlement in North America
1615	Taos	New Spain	New Mexico	United States	
1620	Plymouth	British America	Massachusetts	United States	Oldest town in New England and Massachusetts. Settled by Pilgrims from the Mayflower.
1622	Weymouth	British America	Massachusetts	United States	The Wessagusset Colony, resettled and renamed in 1623
1623	Dover	British America	New Hampshire	United States	Oldest settlement in New Hampshire.
1623	Gloucester	British America	Massachusetts	United States	Abandoned in 1629, but quickly resettled.
1623	Eliot	British America	Maine	United States	Part of Kittery until 1810
1624	Chelsea	British America	Massachusetts	United States	
1624	Fort Wilhelmus	New Netherland	New Jersey	United States	Short-lived factorij on what is now Burlington Island in Delaware River
1624	Fort Orange	New Netherland	New York	United States	Dutch factorij which grew to become the Capital District around Albany
1624	New Amsterdam	New Netherland	New York	United States	Present-day New York City. First settled 1624 on Governors Island, followed by Manhattan the following year.
1625	Merrymount	British America	Massachusetts	United States	Now Quincy, Massachusetts
1626	Salem	British America	Massachusetts	United States	
1626	Socorro	British America	New Mexico	United States	Originally founded as Nuestra Señora de Perpetuo Socorro; abandoned in 1680 after the Pueblo Revolt, and resettled in 1815.
1626	Fort Nassau	New Netherland	New Jersey	United States	A Dutch factorij on Big Timber Creek near what is now Gloucester City
1627	Duxbury	British America	Massachusetts	United States	
1627	Scituate	British America	Massachusetts	United States	
1627	Basseterre	French West Indies	Saint Kitts	Saint Kitts and Nevis	
1628	Bridgetown	British America	Saint Michael	Barbados	
1629	Marblehead	British America	Massachusetts	United States	First naval stronghold of the colonies
1629	Lynn	British America	Massachusetts	United States	Founded as Saugus, but different from Saugus, Massachusetts.
1629	Charlestown	British America	Massachusetts	United States	Now a neighborhood in Boston
1630	Portsmouth	British America	New Hampshire	United States	First known as Strawbery Banke.
1630	Pavonia	New Netherland	New Jersey	United States	First Dutch patroonship in New Jersey, now part of Jersey City
1630	Medford	British America	Massachusetts	United States	
1630	Watertown	British America	Massachusetts	United States	
1630	Dorchester	British America	Massachusetts	United States	Now a neighborhood in Boston
1630	Boston	British America	Massachusetts	United States	
1630	Roxbury	British America	Massachusetts	United States	Later annexed by Boston in 1868
1631	Kent Island	British America	Maryland	United States	Settled by William Claiborne in August of 1631 as a trading outpost and initially considered a part of Virginia. The island was invaded and captured by Maryland Governor, Leonard Calvert, and musketeers loyal to Lord Baltimore in early 1638. Claiborne and Virginia's claims to the island would later be nullified in the English courts in deference to the Maryland Charter.
1631	Saco	British America	Maine	United States	Settled as Winter Harbor.
1631	South Berwick	British America	Maine	United States	Settled by sailors from the Pied Cow who landed at the confluence of the Salmon Falls and Great Works Rivers
1631	Lewes	British America	Delaware	United States	Purchased in 1629 and settled as the short-lived Dutch Zwaanendael Colony in 1631. Because Lewes was Delaware's first town and because Delaware was the first state to ratify the Constitution, it is known as "the first town in the first state."
1631	Cambridge	British America	Massachusetts	United States	
1632	Williamsburg	British America	Virginia	United States	
1633	Ipswich	British America	Massachusetts	United States	
1632	St. John's	British America	Antigua	Antigua and Barbuda	
1633	Hartford	British America	Connecticut	United States	Founded as Fort Hoop by the Dutch, renamed by Thomas Hooker in 1637
1633	Windsor	British America	Connecticut	United States	First English settlement in Connecticut. Founded as Dorchester, renamed in 1637.
1634	Beauport	New France	Quebec	Canada	Became a borough of Quebec City in January 2002.
1634	Wethersfield	British America	Connecticut	United States	Founded as Watertown, renamed in 1637.
1634	Green Bay	British America	Wisconsin	United States	
1634	St. Mary's City	British America	Maryland	United States	The original settlement was the fourth oldest permanent English settlement in the United States.
1634	Trois-Rivières	New France	Quebec	Canada	
1634	Willemstad	Netherlands	Curaçao	Kingdom of the Netherlands	Formerly part of the Netherlands Antilles, now a country of the Kingdom of the Netherlands
1635	Hingham	British America	Massachusetts	United States	First discovered in 1633 and named "Bare Cove", the area was owned by the Native American Tribe Wampanoag. Hingham was settled and established by Reverend Peter Hobart and his followers in 1635; they renamed the area "Hingham", referencing Hingham, Norfolk England. It was then incorporated into the Massachusetts Bay Colony as the 12th town and decades later it was purchased officially from the local natives on July 4, 1655.
1635	Concord	British America	Massachusetts	United States	
1635	Newbury	British America	Massachusetts	United States	
1636	Springfield	British America	Massachusetts	United States	The Massachusetts Bay Colony's first Connecticut River port and its westernmost settlement, 85 miles (137 km) west of Boston Founded as Agawam Plantation by William Pynchon.
1636	Providence	British America	Rhode Island	United States	Oldest settlement in Rhode Island, founded by Roger Williams.
1637	Taunton	British America	Massachusetts	United States	
1637	Sandwich	British America	Massachusetts	United States	Oldest town on Cape Cod
1638	Rowley	British America	Massachusetts	United States	
1638	Portsmouth	British America	Rhode Island	United States	Founded by Anne Hutchinson
1638	Exeter	British America	New Hampshire	United States	One of the four original towns of New Hampshire. Revolutionary War capital of New Hampshire, and site of the ratification of the first state constitution in the North American colonies in January 1776.
1638	Hampton	British America	New Hampshire	United States	Founded by Stephen Bachiler; first known as Winnicunnet.
1638	Sillery	New France	Quebec	Canada	Now part of Quebec City
1638	Swedesboro	British America	New Jersey	United States	Nucleus of the New Sweden colony along the Delaware River into Pennsylvania and Delaware
1638	New Haven	British America	Connecticut	United States	
1638	Sainte-Foy	New France	Quebec	Canada	Merged with the City of Québec in 2002.
1638	Wilmington	British America	Delaware	United States	Grew from Fort Christina, part of the New Sweden colony; originally called Willington
Before 1639	St. Marks	New Spain	Florida	United States	Founded by the Viceroyalty of New Spain as San Marcos de Apalache.
1639	Guilford	British America	Connecticut	United States	The Quinnipiac village of Menunkatuck predated English settlement.
1639	Stratford	British America	Connecticut	United States	
1639	Milford	British America	Connecticut	United States	
1639	Newport	British America	Rhode Island	United States	
1639	Sudbury	British America	Massachusetts	United States	
1640	Southampton	British America	New York	United States	
1640	Farmington	British America	Connecticut	United States	Founded as Tunxis
1640	Braintree	British America	Massachusetts	United States	First settled in 1625 as Merrymount, resettled and incorporated in 1640.
1640	Woburn	British America	Massachusetts	United States	First settled in 1640, incorporated in 1642.
1641	Haverhill	British America	Massachusetts	United States	First settled in 1640, incorporated in 1641.
1642	Maspeth	New Netherland	New York	United States	
1642	Ville-Marie (Montréal)	New France	Quebec	Canada	
1642	Lexington	British America	Massachusetts	United States	
1642	Sorel	New France	Quebec	Canada	Present-day Sorel-Tracy
1642	Warwick	British America	Rhode Island	United States	
1643	Basse-Terre	French West Indies	Guadeloupe	France	Territorial capital
1643	Dolores Hidalgo	New Spain	Guanajuato	Mexico	
1643	Guilford	British America	Connecticut	United States	
1643	Rehoboth	British America	Massachusetts	United States	Settled 1636, incorporated 1643
1644	Hull	British America	Massachusetts	United States	
1644	Longmeadow	British America	Massachusetts	United States	Incorporated October 17, 1783.
1644	Branford	British America	Connecticut	United States	Originally Brentford
1644	Salvatierra	New Spain	Guanajuato	Mexico	
1645	Vlissingen	New Netherland	New York	United States	Present-day Flushing
1646	Andover	British America	Massachusetts	United States	The original Andover, founded by Simon and Anne Bradstreet and the Barker, Osgood, Stevens, Woodbridge and other families, split into two towns on April 7, 1855.
1646	Château-Richer	New France	Quebec	Canada	
1646	New London	British America	Connecticut	United States	Founded as Faire Harbour
1647	Kittery	British America	Maine	United States	Oldest incorporated town in Maine
1647	La Prairie	New France	Quebec	Canada	Founded as a mission by the Jesuits in 1647. The first parish was founded in 1667.
1647	Spanish Wells	British America	Eleuthera	Bahamas	
1649	Annapolis	British America	Maryland	United States	
1650	Saint-Ours	New France	Quebec	Canada	
1650	Kingston	New Netherland	New York	United States	Settled by the Dutch as Esopus, renamed in 1664 by the English.
1651	Cap-de-la-Madeleine	New France	Quebec	Canada	Became a borough of Trois-Rivières in January 2002.
1651	Medfield	British America	Massachusetts	United States	
1651	New Castle	New Netherland	Delaware	United States	Site of Tomakonck, a former native village. Settled by the Dutch as Fort Casimir; renamed New Amstel in 1654.
1651	Sainte-Anne-de-Beaupré	New France	Quebec	Canada	
1652	Natick	British America	Massachusetts	United States	Founded by John Eliot; its name derives from a Massachusett word meaning "place of hills".
1653	Lancaster	British America	Massachusetts	United States	
1654	Northampton	British America	Massachusetts	United States	Founded by a group led by William Houlton and John King.
1654	Pelham	British America	New York	United States	Founded by Thomas Pell, who purchased 9,000 acres (14 sq mi) from the Siwanoy tribe and received a land grant from the English crown.
1655	Cap-Saint-Ignace	New France	Quebec	Canada	
1655	Chelmsford	British America	Massachusetts	United States	Founded by settlers from Concord.
1655	Groton	British America	Massachusetts	United States	
1655	Billerica	British America	Massachusetts	United States	
1657	Longueuil	New France	Quebec	Canada	
1658	Harlem	British America	New York	United States	
1659	Norwichtown	British America	Connecticut	United States	Consolidated with the city of Norwich in 1952.
1659	Assonet	British America	Massachusetts	United States	Incorporated 1683
1659	Hadley	British America	Massachusetts	United States	Founded by a group led by John Russell and Nathaniel Dickinson.
1659	Ciudad Juárez	New Spain	Chihuahua	Mexico	
1660	Bergen	British America	New Jersey	United States	First chartered settlement in New Jersey, at Bergen Square, now part of Jersey City
1660	Placentia	New France	Newfoundland and Labrador	Canada	French capital until 1713, originally known as Plaisance
1660	Rye	British America	New York	United States	
1660	Wrentham	British America	Massachusetts	United States	Separated from Dedham 1660. Incorporated 1673
1661	Schenectady	British America	New York	United States	
1662	Uxbridge	British America	Massachusetts	United States	
1664	L'Ange-Gardien	New France	Quebec	Canada	
1664	Middletown	British America	New Jersey	United States	
1664	Woodbridge	British America	New Jersey	United States	Settled in 1664 and granted a royal charter on June 1, 1669, by King Charles II of England.
1665	Chambly	New France	Quebec	Canada	
1665	Port-de-Paix	French West Indies	Nord-Ouest	Haiti	
1666	Charlesbourg	New France	Quebec	Canada	Became a borough of Quebec City in 2002.
1666	Newark	British America	New Jersey	United States	
1666	Piscatawaytown	British America	New Jersey	United States	The village within the Township of Piscataway, now part of Edison
1666	Saint-Jean-sur-Richelieu	New France	Quebec	Canada	Expanded from Fort Saint-Jean.
1667	Boucherville	New France	Quebec	Canada	
1667	Mendon	British America	Massachusetts	United States	Netmocke Plantation, 1662
1668	Amesbury	British America	Massachusetts	United States	
1668	Saint-Nicolas	New France	Quebec	Canada	Merged with Lévis in 2002.
1668	Sault Ste. Marie	New France	Ontario	Canada	In 1668, French Jesuit missionaries renamed it as Sault Sainte-Marie, and established a mission settlement (present-day Sault Ste. Marie, Michigan) on the river's south bank. Later, a fur trading post was established and the settlement expanded to include both sides of the river. Sault Ste. Marie is one of the oldest French settlements in North America.
1668	Sault Ste. Marie	New France	Michigan	United States	Oldest city in Michigan
1668	Elizabethtown	British America	New Jersey	United States	designated the first capital of New Jersey by the British
1669	Neuville	New France	Quebec	Canada	
1669	Westfield	British America	Massachusetts	United States	
1669	Middleborough	British America	Massachusetts	United States	
1670	Charleston	British America	South Carolina	United States	
1670	Repentigny	New France	Quebec	Canada	
1670	Wallingford	British America	Connecticut	United States	
1670	Hatfield	British America	Massachusetts	United States	
1670	St. Pierre	New France	Saint Pierre and Miquelon	France	A report written in 1670 by the first intendant of New France, Jean Talon, which mentions the presence of thirteen fishermen and four sedentary inhabitants.
1670	Miquelon	New France	Saint Pierre and Miquelon	France	
1671	St. Ignace	New France	Michigan	United States	Founded by Jacques Marquette as the St. Ignace Mission. Second oldest city in Michigan.
1672	Varennes	New France	Quebec	Canada	
1672	Verchères	New France	Quebec	Canada	
1673	L'Ancienne-Lorette	New France	Quebec	Canada	
1673	Worcester, Massachusetts	British America	Massachusetts	United States	Incorporated as a city in 1848.
1673	Prairie du Chien	New France	Wisconsin	United States	Founded on June 17, 1673, by French Pioneers.
1674	Pointe-aux-Trembles	New France	Quebec	Canada	Now part of Montreal.
1674	Waterbury	British America	Connecticut	United States	
1674	Deerfield	British America	Massachusetts	United States	
1675	Lachine	New France	Quebec	Canada	Merged into Montreal in 2002.
1675	Lavaltrie	New France	Quebec	Canada	
1676	Contrecoeur	New France	Quebec	Canada	
1676	Loretteville	New France	Quebec	Canada	Merged with Quebec City in 2002.
1677	Sainte-Anne-de-Bellevue	New France	Quebec	Canada	
1677	Crosswicks	British America	New Jersey	United States	Settled by Quakers
1678	La Pocatière	New France	Quebec	Canada	
1678	Montmagny	New France	Quebec	Canada	
1679	Lévis	New France	Quebec	Canada	The first settlement was formerly known as Lauzon, which merged with Lévis in 1989.
1679	L'Islet	New France	Quebec	Canada	
1679	Saint-Augustin-de-Desmaures	New France	Quebec	Canada	
1680	Ysleta	New Spain	Texas	United States	
1680	South Orange	British America	New Jersey	United States	Expanded from Newark (later Orange)
1680	Creve Coeur	New France	Illinois	United States	Originally Fort Crevecoeur, later Fort Clark (1813).
1681	Baie-Saint-Paul	New France	Quebec	Canada	
1681	Berthierville	New France	Quebec	Canada	
1681	Cockburn Town	British America	Turks and Caicos Islands	United Kingdom	
1681	Bridgewater Township	British America	New Jersey	United States	
1681	Saint-François	New France	Quebec	Canada	Integrated into Laval in 1965.
1682	Moorestown	British America	New Jersey	United States	
1682	Philadelphia	British America	Pennsylvania	United States	
1682	Norfolk	British America	Virginia	United States	
1683	Dover	British America	Delaware	United States	
1683	Lachenaie	New France	Quebec	Canada	In 2001, Lachenaie merged with Terrebonne.
1682	Rivière-du-Loup	New France	Quebec	Canada	
1684	Bécancour	New France	Quebec	Canada	
1686	Arkansas Post	New France	Arkansas	United States	
1687	New Britain	British America	Connecticut	United States	
1687	Rivière-des-Prairies	New France	Quebec	Canada	Now part of the Rivière-des-Prairies–Pointe-aux-Trembles borough of Montreal.
1690	Oka	New France	Quebec	Canada	
1693	Glastonbury	British America	Connecticut	United States	Settled 1636; incorporated in 1693 as Glassenbury. Known as Glastenbury from about 1785 to 1870.)
1693	Kingston	British America	Kingston	Jamaica	
1694	Newark	British America	Delaware	United States	
1694	Santa Cruz	New Spain	New Mexico	United States	
1695	Nassau	British America	New Providence	Bahamas	
1696	Rimouski	New France	Quebec	Canada	
1696	Sault-au-Récollet	New France	Quebec	Canada	Now part of the Ahuntsic-Cartierville borough of Montreal
1698	Pensacola	New Spain	Florida	United States	Founded by Don Tristán de Luna y Arellano in 1559; abandoned in 1561. Permanently established in 1698.
1700	Mascouche	New France	Quebec	Canada	
1701	Detroit	New France	Michigan	United States	Founded in 1701 as Fort Détroit by the French explorer Antoine de la Mothe Cadillac
1701	Dracut	British America	Massachusetts	United States	
1701	Nicolet	New France	Quebec	Canada	
1702	Le Moyne	New France	Alabama	United States	Founded as Fort Louis de la Louisiane by France; abandoned in 1711.
1703	Amherst	British America	Massachusetts	United States	
1703	Kaskaskia	New France	Illinois	United States	
1703	Saint-Sulpice	New France	Quebec	Canada	
1705	Bath	British America	North Carolina	United States	Oldest incorporated town in North Carolina
1706	Albuquerque	New Spain	New Mexico	United States	
1709	Chihuahua	New Spain	Chihuahua	Mexico	
1710	Chatham	British America	New Jersey	United States	Land purchased in 1680.
1710	New Bern	British America	North Carolina	United States	Settled by German-Swiss immigrants.
1711	Mobile	New France	Alabama	United States	Le Moyne relocated to Mobile. From 1702 to 1711, it was the French colonial capital of La Louisiane.
1711	Needham	British America	Massachusetts	United States	
1711	Pointe-Claire	New France	Quebec	Canada	
1711	Beaufort	British America	South Carolina	United States	
1714	Natchitoches	New France	Louisiana	United States	Oldest settlement in the Louisiana Purchase
1714	Freehold	British America	New Jersey	United States	Originally known as Monmouth Courthouse, the site of the Battle of Monmouth
1715 (prior to)	Kekionga	British America	Indiana	United States	Capital of the Miami people
1715	Les Cèdres	New France	Quebec	Canada	
1716	Kahnawake	New France	Quebec	Canada	Homeland of Saint Kateri Tekakwitha (1656–1680).
1716	Nacogdoches	New Spain	Texas	United States	Spanish mission established in an older Caddo village.
1716	Natchez	New France	Mississippi	United States	Dates to the founding of Fort Rosalie by the French.
1716	Georgetown	British America	Maine	United States	Originally the present-day West Bath, Bath, Phippsburg, Arrowsic, Georgetown and part of Woolwich
1717	L'Assomption	New France	Quebec	Canada	Settled 1647
1717	Ouiatenon	New France	Indiana	United States	
1718	New Orleans	New France	Louisiana	United States	
1718	San Antonio	New Spain	Texas	United States	
1719	Longue-Pointe	New France	Quebec	Canada	Now part of Montreal
1719	Trenton	British America	New Jersey	United States	
1720	Saint-Laurent	New France	Quebec	Canada	Merged with Montreal in 2002.
1720	Biloxi	New France	Mississippi	United States	Founded as Fort Louis by France.
1721	Baton Rouge	New France	Louisiana	United States	
1721	Cortazar	New Spain	Guanajuato	Mexico	
1721	Saint-Jean-Port-Joli	New France	Quebec	Canada	
1722	Prairie Du Rocher	New France	Illinois	United States	
1722	Louiseville	New France	Quebec	Canada	
1723	Beaufort	British America	North Carolina	United States	
1723	Terrebonne	New France	Quebec	Canada	
1725	Concord	British America	New Hampshire	United States	
1728	Fredericksburg	British America	Virginia	United States	
1728	Nuuk	Denmark-Norway	Sermersooq	Greenland	
1729	Baltimore	British America	Maryland	United States	
1729	Lancaster	British America	Pennsylvania	United States	
1729	Pabos	New France	Quebec	Canada	Now part of Chandler.
1729	Georgetown	British America	South Carolina	United States	
1730	New Brunswick	British America	New Jersey	United States	
1732	Lanoraie	New France	Quebec	Canada	
1732	Vincennes	New France	Indiana	United States	
1732	Camden	British America	South Carolina	United States	
1732	Kingstree	British America	South Carolina	United States	
1733	Richmond	British America	Virginia	United States	
1733	Saint-Vincent-de-Paul	New France	Quebec	Canada	Integrated into Laval in 1965.
1733	Savannah	British America	Georgia	United States	
1733	Wilmington	British America	North Carolina	United States	Founded as "New Carthage" in 1733, renamed Wilmington in 1740
1735	Ste. Genevieve	New France	Missouri	United States	French colonial settlement; oldest continually-inhabited settlement in Missouri
1736	Châteauguay	New France	Quebec	Canada	
1736	Gorham	British America	Maine	United States	
1736	Augusta	British America	Georgia	United States	
1736	Darien	British America	Georgia	United States	
1736	Fort Frederica	British America	Georgia	United States	Built by the British, abandoned about 1774
1738	Pointe-du-Lac	New France	Quebec	Canada	Merged with Trois-Rivières in 2002.
1738	Saint-Joseph-de-Beauce	New France	Quebec	Canada	
1739	Saint-Mathias-sur-Richelieu	New France	Quebec	Canada	
1739	Fort Assumption	New France	Tennessee	United States	Built by France in 1739 and abandoned in 1740
1740	Belén	New Spain	New Mexico	United States	
1740	L'Île-Perrot and Notre-Dame-de-l'Île-Perrot	New France	Quebec	Canada	
1740	Cheraw	British America	South Carolina	United States	
1741	Bethlehem	British America	Pennsylvania	United States	
1741	Sainte-Geneviève and Pierrrefonds	New France	Quebec	Canada	Merged with Montreal in 2002.
1742	Les Écureuils	New France	Quebec	Canada	Now Donnacona
1745	Sainte-Marie	New France	Quebec	Canada	
1745	Sainte-Rose	New France	Quebec	Canada	Integrated into Laval in 1965.
1746	Saint-Henri	New France	Quebec	Canada	
1746	Merrimack	British America	New Hampshire	United States	
1748	Petersburg	British America	Virginia	United States	
1749	Alexandria	British America	Virginia	United States	
1749	Goliad	New Spain	Texas	United States	Expanded from Presidio La Bahía
1749	Halifax	British America	Nova Scotia	Canada	
1749	Port-au-Prince	French West Indies	Ouest	Haiti	
1749	Reynosa	New Spain	Tamaulipas	Mexico	Originally known as Villa de Nuestra Señora de Guadalupe de Reynosa.
1750	Erie	New France	Pennsylvania	United States	Expanded from the French Fort Presque Isle.
1750	Rock Island	British America	Illinois	United States	Originally the Native American Saukenuk
1751	Carlisle	British America	Pennsylvania	United States	
1751	Georgetown	British America	Maryland	United States	Became part of the District of Columbia when the district was incorporated in 1801. Georgetown and its government were incorporated into the district's government in 1871.
1751	Las Trampas	New Spain	New Mexico	United States	
1752	Portsmouth	British America	Virginia	United States	
1752	Akwesasne	New France	New York, Ontario, Quebec	Canada, United States	First known as Saint-Régis.
1752	Saint-Constant	New France	Quebec	Canada	
1753	Saint-Philippe	New France	Quebec	Canada	
1754	Augusta	British America	Maine	United States	
1754	Pittsburgh	New France	Pennsylvania	United States	Expanded from the French Fort Duquesne; replaced by the British Fort Pitt in 1758.
1755	Laredo	New Spain	Texas	United States	
1755	Charlotte	British America	North Carolina	United States	
1757	Saint-Hyacinthe	New France	Quebec	Canada	
1761	Charlottesville	British America	Virginia	United States	
1762	Shepherdstown	British America	West Virginia	United States	Originally known as Mecklenburg.
1762	Allentown	British America	Pennsylvania	United States	Incorporated as Northamptontown.
1763	St. Louis	New France	Missouri	United States	Oldest American City West of the Mississippi River
1763	Burlington	British America	Vermont	United States	
1764	Amherst	British America	Nova Scotia	Canada	
1764	Charlottetown	British America	Prince Edward Island	Canada	
1764	Opelousas	New France	Louisiana	United States	
1765	Saint-Martinville	New France	Louisiana	United States	
1765	St. Charles	New France	Missouri	United States	
1766	Moncton	British America	New Brunswick	Canada	
1766	Vergennes	British America	Vermont	United States	
1768	Beloeil	British America	Quebec	Canada	
1768	L'Acadie	British America	Quebec	Canada	Merged with Saint-Jean-sur-Richelieu in 2001.
1768	New Smyrna Beach	British America	Florida	United States	A Scottish entrepreneur established a colony of 1,225 immigrants in the largest colonization attempt in the US.
1768	Saint-Eustache	British America	Quebec	Canada	
1769	San Diego	New Spain	California	United States	Expanded from the Presidio of San Diego.
1769	Ninety Six	British America	South Carolina	United States	
1770	Monterey	New Spain	California	United States	Expanded from Presidio of Monterey; original capital of California
1770	San Blas	New Spain	Nayarit	Mexico	Spanish Naval Department headquarters
1771	Brunswick	British America	Georgia	United States	
1772	Ellicott City	British America	Maryland	United States	
1772	Morgantown	British America	West Virginia	United States	
1773	Guatemala City	New Spain	Guatemala	Guatemala	
1774	Matamoros	New Spain	Tamaulipas	Mexico	Originally known as San Juan de los Esteros Hermosos.
1774	Orizaba	New Spain	Veracruz	Mexico	
1774	Unalaska	Russian America	Alaska	United States	Oldest Russian settlement on the Aleutian Islands, dating to the 1760s. Permanent trading post established in 1774.
1775	Tucson	New Spain	Arizona	United States	Date of Spanish presidio
1775	Lexington	British America	Kentucky	United States	
1775	Boonesborough	British America	Kentucky	United States	Expanded from Fort Boonesborough, built by Daniel Boone.
1776	San Francisco	New Spain	California	United States	
1776	Fort Watauga	British America	Tennessee	United States	Abandoned in 1780
1777	San Jose	New Spain	California	United States	Originally known as El Pueblo de San José de Guadalupe, the first town in the Spanish colony of Nueva California (which became Alta California).
1778	Louisville	United States	Kentucky	United States	Expanded from Fort Nelson, established by George Rogers Clark.
1778	West Point	United States	New York	United States	Expanded from Fort Clinton.
1779	Jonesborough	United States	Tennessee	United States	First capital of the State of Franklin, in 1784
1779	Nashville	United States	Tennessee	United States	Expanded from Fort Nashborough.
1781	Montpelier	United States	Vermont	United States	
1781	Los Angeles	New Spain	California	United States	
1783	Clarksville	United Colonies	Indiana	United States	
1783	Kingston	British America	Ontario	Canada	Formerly known as Fort Frontenac. In 1673, the original fort was built and called Fort Cataraqui. It was later renamed Fort Frontenac. It was abandoned and razed in 1689, then rebuilt in 1695. Due to the various periods of abandonment, Windsor, Ontario, where pre-settlement occurred after Kingston, remains known as the oldest continually inhabited European-founded settlement in Canada west of Montreal. In 1783, to settlement for displaced British colonists, or Loyalists, the British Crown entered into an agreement with the Mississaugas to purchase land east of the Bay of Quinte.
1784	Cornwall	British North America	Ontario	Canada	Founded by a group of United Empire Loyalists led by Lieutenant-Colonel John Johnson.
1784	Frenchtown	New France	Michigan	United States	Fourth French settlement in Michigan.
1785	Harrisburg	United States	Pennsylvania	United States	
1785	Asheville	United States	North Carolina	United States	
1785	Dubuque	New France	Iowa	United States	Oldest city in Iowa, and one of the oldest European settlements west of the Mississippi River.
1785	Fredericton	British America	New Brunswick	Canada	
1785	Sydney	British North America	Nova Scotia	Canada	Former capital of the Colony of Cape Breton
1786	Columbia	United States	South Carolina	United States	
1786	Florissant	United States	Missouri	United States	Originally known as St. Ferdinand.
1786	Frankfort	United States	Kentucky	United States	
1786	Lynchburg	United States	Virginia	United States	
1786	Portland	United States	Maine	United States	
1786	Steubenville	United States	Ohio	United States	
1787	Spartanburg	United States	South Carolina	United States	
1788	Marietta	United States	Ohio	United States	First permanent American settlement in the Northwest Territory
1788	Cincinnati	United States	Ohio	United States	
1788	Charleston	United States	West Virginia	United States	Expanded from Fort Lee
1789	Santa Cruz de Nuca	New Spain	British Columbia	Canada	First European settlement in British Columbia; only Spanish settlement in Canada
1790	Hamilton	British North America	Bermuda	United Kingdom	
1790	Washington	United States	District of Columbia	United States	
1790	Vicksburg	New Spain	Mississippi	United States	Expanded from the Spanish Fort Nogales.
1791	Georgetown	United States	Delaware	United States	
1791	Santa Cruz	New Spain	California	United States	
1791	Monroe	New Spain	Louisiana	United States	Originally known as Fort Miro
1791	Kenai	Russian America	Alaska	United States	Expanded from the Russian-American Company's Fort St. Nicholas.
1791	Knoxville	United States	Tennessee	United States	
1791	Bangor	United States	Maine	United States	
1792	Kodiak	Russian America	Alaska	United States	Founded in 1792 by Alexander Baranov as the new site for Three Saints Bay, founded in 1784.
1792	Raleigh	United States	North Carolina	United States	
1793	Toronto	British North America	Ontario	Canada	Formerly known as Fort Toronto. In 1750, Fort Toronto was the second French trading post established in the Humber River area. Fort Toronto, also known as Fort Portneuf, was a French trading post that was located near the mouth of the Humber River in what is now Toronto, Ontario. The first one (known as Magasin Royal or Fort Douville) had been built in 1720 near today's Baby Point, north of the mouth of the Humber River (then known as the Tanaovate River). The French abandoned Magasin Royal by the end of the 1720s, and they did not establish another trading post in the area until the construction of Fort Toronto. Fort Toronto's immediate success in attracting First Nations traders led to the establishment of nearby Fort Rouillé in 1751 until it was destroyed in 1759.
1793	Ancaster	British North America	Ontario	Canada	Founded as a town in 1793, it immediately developed itself into one of the first significant and influential early British Upper Canada communities established during the late 18th century eventually amalgamating with the city of Hamilton in 2001.
1794	Fort Wayne	United States	Indiana	United States	
1796	Chillicothe	United States	Ohio	United States	
1796	Cleveland	United States	Ohio	United States	
1796	Dayton	United States	Ohio	United States	
1796	Youngstown	United States	Ohio	United States	
1797	Windsor	British North America	Ontario	Canada	In 1749, a French agricultural settlement was established at the site of Windsor, Ontario. The area was first named la Petite Côte ("Little Coast"—as opposed to the longer coastline on the Detroit side of the river). Later it was called La Côte de Misère ("Poverty Coast") because of the sandy soils near LaSalle. In 1797, after the American Revolution, the settlement of "Sandwich" was established. Windsor was incorporated as a village in 1854, then became a town in 1858, and gained city status in 1892. It is the oldest continually inhabited European-founded settlement in Canada west of Montreal, despite being settled after other areas in the country.
1797	Athens, Ohio	United States	Ohio	United States	
1797	Franklinton	United States	Ohio	United States	Absorbed by Columbus.
1797	Mentor	United States	Ohio	United States	
1797	Zanesville	United States	Ohio	United States	
1797	Greenville	United States	South Carolina	United States	
1798	Bowling Green	United States	Kentucky	United States	
1798	Warren	United States	Ohio	United States	
1798	Bethel, Ohio	United States	Ohio	United States	Formerly known as Denham Town, founded by Obed Denham.
1799	Hudson	United States	Ohio	United States	
1799	Potosi	United States	Missouri	United States	
1799	Elizabethton	United States	Tennessee	United States	Expanded from Fort Watauga which was abandoned
1799	Ravenna	United States	Ohio	United States	
1799	Aurora	United States	Ohio	United States	
1799	Sitka	Russian America	Alaska	United States	Original capital of Alaska; destroyed in 1802, reestablished in 1804.
1800	Binghamton	United States	New York	United States	Formerly known as Chenango Point; expanded from rural settlements into a planned city
1800	Buffalo	United States	New York	United States	Expanded from four log cabins.
1800	Hull	British North America	Quebec	Canada	Formerly known as Wright's Town
1801	Athens	United States	Georgia	United States	Named after Athens, Greece.
1801	Burrville/Clinton	United States	Tennessee	United States	Renamed Clinton in 1809
1803	Ashtabula	United States	Ohio	United States	
1803	Chicago	United States	Illinois	United States	Expanded from Fort Dearborn.
1804	Stow	United States	Ohio	United States	
1804	Milledgeville	United States	Georgia	United States	
1805	Huntsville	United States	Alabama	United States	
1807	Prince George	British North America	British Columbia	Canada	Expanded from the fur-trading post of Fort George, established by the North West Company.
1810	Manchester	United States	New Hampshire	United States	
1810	San Bernardino	New Spain	California	United States	
1811	Astoria	United States	Oregon	United States	Expanded from Fort Astoria, founded by the Pacific Fur Company.
1811	Murfreesboro	United States	Tennessee	United States	Originally named Cannonsburgh; state capital from 1818 to 1826.
1812	Columbus	United States	Ohio	United States	
1812	Kamloops	British North America	British Columbia	Canada	Expanded from the fur-trading posts of Fort Cumcloups (Fort Kamloops) and Fort She-whaps (Shuswap), founded by the Pacific Fur and North West Companies.
1815	Hamilton	British North America	Ontario	Canada	George Hamilton, a settler and local politician, established a town site in the northern portion Barton Township after the war in 1815.
1815	Pickerington	United States	Ohio	United States	
1815	Jonesboro	United States	Arkansas	United States	
1816	Chattanooga	United States	Tennessee	United States	Originally named Ross's Landing.
1816	Cambridge	British North America	Ontario	Canada	Originally named Shades Mill; renamed Galt in 1827. Galt merged with the towns of Preston and Hespeler, the village of Blair and parts of Waterloo township to form Cambridge in 1973. Oldest settled area in the Waterloo Regional Municipality
1816	Saginaw	United States	Michigan	United States	
1817	Fort Smith	United States	Arkansas	United States	
1817	Milan	United States	Ohio	United States	
1818	Pontiac	United States	Michigan	United States	Arrival of first settlers in Michigan's first inland settlement; recognized by the state legislature in 1837, and incorporated as a city in 1861.
1818	Medina	United States	Ohio	United States	
1818	Columbia	United States	Missouri	United States	
1818	Jim Thorpe	United States	Pennsylvania	United States	Formerly known as Mauch Chunk and burial place of Native American athlete Jim Thorpe
1819	Memphis	United States	Tennessee	United States	Expanded from the 1739 French Fort de l'Assomption which was not resettled for 79 years
1819	Chapel Hill	United States	North Carolina	United States	
1819	Montgomery	United States	Alabama	United States	Expanded from the 1540 French settlement, Fort Toulouse.
1819	Springfield	United States	Illinois	United States	
1819	Tuscaloosa	United States	Alabama	United States	
1820	South Bend	United States	Indiana	United States	Formerly named Big St. Joseph Station.
1820	Oliver's Grove	United States	Minnesota	United States	Near the confluence of the Mississippi, St. Croix, and Vermillion Rivers; established as a trading post and a military detachment from Fort Snelling.
1821	Alexandria	British North America	British Columbia	Canada	Expended from the fur-trading post of Fort Alexandria, founded by the North West Company.
1821	Bridgeport	United States	Connecticut	United States	
1821	Little Rock	United States	Arkansas	United States	
1821	Indianapolis	United States	Indiana	United States	
1822	Jacksonville	United States	Florida	United States	
1822	Jackson	United States	Mississippi	United States	
1823	Sonoma	First Mexican Republic	California	United States	Founded as Mission San Francisco Solano.
1823	Peoria	United States	Illinois	United States	Founded as Peoria in 1823.
1823	Tampa	United States	Florida	United States	Expanded from Fort Brooke.
1824	Ann Arbor	United States	Michigan	United States	
1824	Tallahassee	United States	Florida	United States	
1824	Victoria	First Mexican Republic	Texas	United States	
1825	Akron	United States	Ohio	United States	
1825	Vancouver	United States	Washington	United States	Expanded from Fort Vancouver.
1825	Grand Rapids	United States	Michigan	United States	
1825	Irapuato	First Mexican Republic	Guanajuato	Mexico	
1826	London	British North America	Ontario	Canada	
1826	Ottawa	British North America	Ontario	Canada	Originally known as Bytown.
1826	Wabasha	United States	Minnesota	United States	Oldest city in Minnesota
1827	Gonzales	United States	Texas	United States	Founded in 1825, abandoned shortly after, refounded in 1827
1827	Mineral Point	United States	Wisconsin	United States	Third-oldest city in Wisconsin
1827	Guelph	British North America	Ontario	Canada	
1827	Oakville	British North America	Ontario	Canada	
1827	St. Andrews	United States	Florida	United States	Now part of Panama City
1827	Langley	British North America	British Columbia	Canada	
1828	Key West	United States	Florida	United States	
1828	Columbus	United States	Georgia	United States	
1829	Oregon City	United States	Oregon	United States	
1829	Bainbridge	United States	Georgia	United States	
1833	Milwaukee	United States	Wisconsin	United States	
1833	Kitchener	British North America	Ontario	Canada	Formerly Berlin; renamed in 1916.
1833	Santa Rosa	Centralist Republic of Mexico	California	United States	
1835	Austin	Centralist Republic of Mexico	Texas	United States	
1835	Kenosha	United States	Wisconsin	United States	Originally named Southport; renamed in 1850.
1836	Shreveport	United States	Louisiana	United States	
1836	Madison	United States	Wisconsin	United States	
1836	Tulsa	Muscogee (Creek) Confederacy	Oklahoma	United States	Originally known as Lochapoka.
1837	Lansing	United States	Michigan	United States	
1837	Houston	Republic of Texas	Texas	United States	
1837	Oxford	United States	Mississippi	United States	
1837	Toledo	United States	Ohio	United States	
1839	Sacramento	Mexico	California	United States	
1841	Dallas	Republic of Texas	Texas	United States	
1841	Racine	United States	Wisconsin	United States	
1843	Atlanta	United States	Georgia	United States	
1843	Des Moines	United States	Iowa	United States	
1843	Victoria	British North America	British Columbia	Canada	Incorporated in 1862.
1844	Chagrin Falls	United States	Ohio	United States	
1844	Redding	Mexico	California	United States	Originally known as Shasta.
1845	Portland	United States	Oregon	United States	
1847	Brantford	United States	Ontario	Canada	Originally known as Brant's Ford.
1847	Salt Lake City	United States	Utah	United States	Originally known as Great Salt Lake City.
1847	Harrisburg	United States	Illinois	United States	
1847	Napa	United States	California	United States	Founded during the Mexican-American War but after the US Conquest of Alta California.
1848	Mesilla	Mexico	New Mexico	United States	
1849	Las Cruces	Mexico	New Mexico	United States	
1849	Provo	United States	Utah	United States	Expanded from Fort Utah.
1850	Kansas City	United States	Missouri	United States	Originally named Kansas.
1850	Phoenix	United States	Oregon	United States	
1851	Cedar City	United States	Utah	United States	
1851	La Crosse	United States	Wisconsin	United States	
1851	Seattle	United States	Washington	United States	
1851	Vallejo	United States	California	United States	Originally part of Rancho Suscol granted to Mariano Guadalupe Vallejo in 1843.
1852	Oakland	United States	California	United States	
1852	Roanoke	United States	Virginia	United States	founded in 1852 as Big Lick, renamed Roanoke in 1884
1854	Gainesville	United States	Florida	United States	
1854	Omaha	United States	Nebraska	United States	
1854	Saint Paul	United States	Minnesota	United States	
1854	Topeka	United States	Kansas	United States	
1854	Versailles	United States	Missouri	United States	
1855	Champaign	United States	Illinois	United States	Originally named West Urbana.
1856	College Park	United States	Maryland	United States	
1856	Fresno	United States	California	United States	Originally part of Millerton from 1856-1872.
1856	Lincoln	United States	Nebraska	United States	Originally named Lancaster.
1856	O'Fallon	United States	Missouri	United States	
1857	Appleton	United States	Wisconsin	United States	
1858	Carson City	United States	Nevada	United States	
1858	Denver	United States	Colorado	United States	
1858	Boulder	United States	Colorado	United States	
1858	New Westminster	British North America	British Columbia	Canada	
1859	Olympia	United States	Washington	United States	
1860	Bakersfield	United States	California	United States	Originally known as Kern Island and then Baker's Field.
1861	St. George	United States	Utah	United States	
1862	Boise	United States	Idaho	United States	
1862	Prince Albert	British North America	Saskatchewan	Canada	Originally known as Isbister's Settlement.
1864	Salinas	United States	California	United States	
1865	Idaho Falls	United States	Idaho	United States	Originally known as Taylor's Crossing and then Eagle Rock
1865	Sioux Falls	United States	South Dakota	United States	Expanded from Fort Dakota.
1867	Cheyenne	United States	Wyoming	United States	
1867	Minneapolis	United States	Minnesota	United States	
1867	Vancouver	British North America	British Columbia	Canada	Originally known as Gastown.
1868	Davis	United States	California	United States	Originally known as Davisville.
1868	Elko	United States	Nevada	United States	
1868	Phoenix	United States	Arizona	United States	
1870	Wichita	United States	Kansas	United States	
1871	Birmingham	United States	Alabama	United States	
1871	Longmont	United States	Colorado	United States	Originally formed as the Chicago-Colorado Colony.
1871	Colorado Springs	United States	Colorado	United States	Originally named Fountain Colony.
1871	Fargo	United States	North Dakota	United States	Originally named Centralia.
1872	Anniston	United States	Alabama	United States	
1872	Dodge City	United States	Kansas	United States	
1873	Winnipeg	Canada	Manitoba	Canada	Formerly known as Fort Rouge. In 1738, Fort Rouge was built on the Assiniboine River in Manitoba, Canada, on the site of what is now the city of Winnipeg. Its exact location is unknown. Its name in English means "red fort". The fort seems to have had a primary purpose as a depot and was abandoned by 1749.
1874	Pasadena	United States	California	United States	
1875	Orlando	United States	Florida	United States	
1877	Billings	United States	Montana	United States	
1878	Moab	United States	Utah	United States	
1879	Aspen	United States	Colorado	United States	Originally known as Ute City.
1879	Spokane	United States	Washington	United States	
1880	Durango	United States	Colorado	United States	
1881	Brandon	Canada	Manitoba	Canada	
1882	Grand Junction	United States	Colorado	United States	
1882	Regina	British North America	Saskatchewan	Canada	
1883	Grants Pass	United States	Oregon	United States	Originally known as Grant's Pass, including the apostrophe
1883	Saskatoon	British North America	Saskatchewan	Canada	
1884	Calgary	British North America	Alberta	Canada	Formerly known as Fort Calgary. In 1875, Fort Brisebois was established, after the outpost's first commander. It was renamed Fort Calgary in June 1876.
1885	Ruston	United States	Louisiana	United States	
1886	Nelson	Canada	British Columbia	Canada	
1886	Takoma Park	United States	Maryland	United States	
1887	Gulfport	United States	Mississippi	United States	
1889	Clemson	United States	South Carolina	United States	Originally known as Calhoun.
1889	Norman	United States	Oklahoma	United States	
1889	Pocatello	United States	Idaho	United States	Formely served as a waystation to allow access through the Portneuf Gap to the south.
1889	Oklahoma City	United States	Oklahoma	United States	
1889	Tijuana	Mexico	Baja California	Mexico	Tijuana derives from the Kumeyaay Tiwan ("by the sea")
1890	Lethbridge	British North America	Alberta	Canada	Formerly known as Fort Whoop-Up. In 1869, Fort Hamilton was first built near what is now Lethbridge, Alberta. A second, more secure fort was built, which was later nicknamed Fort Whoop-Up.
1892	Edmonton	British North America	Alberta	Canada	Formerly known as Fort Edmonton. In 1795, Fort Edmonton was established on the river's north bank as a major trading post for the HBC, near the mouth of the Sturgeon River close to present-day Fort Saskatchewan. Fort Edmonton was the name of a series of trading posts of the Hudson's Bay Company (HBC) from 1795 to 1914. The fifth and final Fort Edmonton, 1830–1914, was the one that evolved into present-day Edmonton.
1892	Grottoes	United States	Virginia	United States	
1893	Kamloops	Canada	British Columbia	Canada	From the Shuswap Tk'emlups ("meeting of the waters")
1894	Yorkton	British North America	Saskatchewan	Canada	In 1882, a group of businessmen and investors formed the York Farmers Colonization Company.
1894	Palo Alto	United States	California	United States	
1894	Tempe	United States	Arizona	United States	
1896	Dawson City	British North America	Yukon	Canada	Capital of the Yukon Territory until 1952
1896	Miami	United States	Florida	United States	
1896	State College	United States	Pennsylvania	United States	
1899	Estevan	British North America	Saskatchewan	Canada	In 1892, the first settlers arrived in what was to become Estevan. It was incorporated as a village in 1899, and later became a town in 1906.
1901	Twin Falls	United States	Idaho	United States	
1905	Cranbrook	Canada	British Columbia	Canada	
1903	Moose Jaw	British North America	Saskatchewan	Canada	In 1882, settlement began there and the city was incorporated in 1903.
1903	Swift Current	British North America	Saskatchewan	Canada	In 1883, the settlement of Swift Current was established. On September 21, 1903, the Hamlet of Swift Current became a village and on March 15, 1907, Swift Current became a town when the population reached 550 people.
1905	Las Vegas	United States	Nevada	United States	
1906	Virginia Beach	United States	Virginia	United States	
1906	North Battleford	Canada	Saskatchewan	Canada	In 1875, permanent European settlement started in the area centred around the town of Battleford, and located on the south side of the North Saskatchewan River.
1911	The Pas	Canada	Manitoba	Canada	Expanded from Fort Paskoyac.
1914	Anchorage	United States	Alaska	United States	
1915	Prince George	Canada	British Columbia	Canada	Expanded from Fort George.
1916	Truth Or Consequences	United States	New Mexico	United States	Originally named Hot Springs.
1934	Yellowknife	Canada	Northwest Territories	Canada	
1942	Iqaluit	Canada	Nunavut	Canada	
1950	Alert	Canada	Nunavut	Canada	World's northernmost permanently-inhabited place
1956	Corner Brook	Canada	Newfoundland and Labrador	Canada	
1970	Cancún	Mexico	Quintana Roo	Mexico	Planned balneario
2002	Gatineau	Canada	Quebec	Canada	Formed by merging five cities, including Hull.

== See also ==
- List of cities in the Americas by year of foundation
- List of Hudson's Bay Company trading posts
- List of French forts in North America
- Former colonies and territories in Canada
- Timeline of the European colonization of North America
