= Timeline of the European colonization of North America =

This is a chronology and timeline of the European colonization of the Americas, with founding dates of selected European settlements.

== Pre–Columbus ==
- 986: Norsemen settle Greenland and Bjarni Herjólfsson sights coast of North America, but doesn't land (see also Norse colonization of the Americas).
- c. 1021: Norse settle briefly in L'Anse aux Meadows in Newfoundland.
- c. 1450: Norse colony in Greenland dies out.

== 15th century ==
- 1492: Columbus sets sail aboard the Niña, Pinta, and Santa Maria.
- 1492: Columbus reaches the Bahamas, Cuba and Hispaniola.
- 1492: La Navidad is established on the island of Hispaniola; it was destroyed by the following year.
- 1493: The colony of La Isabela is established on the island of Hispaniola.
- 1493: Columbus arrives in Puerto Rico
- 1494: Columbus arrives in Jamaica.
- 1496: Santo Domingo, the first European permanent settlement, is built.
- 1497: John Cabot reaches Newfoundland.
- 1498: In his third voyage, Columbus reaches Trinidad and Tobago.
- 1498: La Isabela is abandoned by the Spanish.
- 1499: João Fernandes Lavrador maps Labrador and Newfoundland

== 16th century ==
- 1501: Corte-Real brothers explore the coast of what is today the Canadian province of Newfoundland and Labrador
- 1502: Columbus sails along the mainland coast south of Yucatán, and reaches present-day Honduras, Nicaragua, Costa Rica and Panama
- 1503: Las Tortugas noted by Columbus in passage through the Western Caribbean present-day Cayman Islands
- 1508: Ponce de León founds Caparra on San Juan Bautista (now Puerto Rico)
- 1511: Conquest of Cuba begins
- 1513: Ponce de León in Florida
- 1513: Núñez de Balboa claims the Pacific Ocean and its shores for Spain
- 1515: Conquest of Cuba completed
- 1517: Francisco Hernández de Córdoba lands on the Yucatán Peninsula
- 1519: Founding of Villa Rica de la Vera Cruz (Veracruz)
- 1519: Álvarez de Pineda explores the Gulf Coast of the United States
- 1519: Founding of Panama City by Pedro Arias Dávila
- 1521: Hernán Cortés completes the conquest of the Aztec Empire.
- 1521: Juan Ponce de León tries and fails to settle in Florida.
- 1524: Pedro de Alvarado conquers present-day Guatemala and El Salvador.
- 1524: Giovanni da Verrazzano sails along most of the east coast.
- 1525: Estêvão Gomes enters Upper New York Bay and reaches Nova Scotia
- 1526: Lucas Vázquez de Ayllón briefly establishes the failed settlement of San Miguel de Gualdape in South Carolina, the first site of enslavement of Africans in North America and of the first slave rebellion.
- 1527: Fishermen are using the harbor at St. John's, Newfoundland and other places on the coast.
- 1531: Spanish found Puebla de Zaragoza and Santiago de Querétaro.
- 1535: Jacques Cartier reaches Quebec.
- 1536: Cabeza de Vaca reaches Mexico City after wandering through North America.
- 1538: Failed Huguenot settlement on St. Kitts in the Caribbean (destroyed by the Spanish).
- 1539: Hernando de Soto explores the interior from Florida to Arkansas.
- 1539: Francisco de Ulloa explores the Baja California peninsula.
- 1540: Coronado travels from Mexico to eastern Kansas.
- 1540: López de Cárdenas reaches the Grand Canyon (the area is ignored for the next 200 years).
- 1541: Spanish found Nueva Ciudad de Mechuacán (Morelia)
- 1541: Failed French settlement at Charlesbourg-Royal (Quebec City) by Cartier and Roberval.
- 1542: Juan Rodriguez Cabrillo reaches the California coast.
- 1559: Failed Spanish settlement at Pensacola, Florida.
- 1562: Failed Huguenot settlement in South Carolina (Charlesfort-Santa Elena site).
- 1564: French Huguenots at Jacksonville, Florida (Fort Caroline).
- 1565: Spanish slaughter French 'heretics' at Fort Caroline.
- 1565: Spanish found Saint Augustine, Florida. (Mission Nombre de Dios)
- 1566–1587: Spanish in South Carolina (Charlesfort-Santa Elena site).
- 1568: Dutch revolt against Spain begins. The economic model developed in the Netherlands would define colonial policies in the next two centuries.
- 1570: Failed Spanish settlement on Chesapeake Bay (Ajacán Mission).
- 1576: Spanish found León de los Aldama.
- 1576: Martin Frobisher reaches the coast of Labrador and Baffin Island.
- 1579: Sir Francis Drake claims New Albion.
- 1583: England formally claims Newfoundland (Humphrey Gilbert).
- 1585: Roanoke Colony founded by English on Roanoke Island, North Carolina, failed in 1587
- 1598: Failed French settlement on Sable Island off Nova Scotia.
- 1598: Spanish settlement in Northern New Mexico.
- 1600: By 1600 Spain and Portugal were still the only significant colonial powers. North of Mexico the only settlements were Saint Augustine and the isolated outpost in northern New Mexico. Exploration of the interior was largely abandoned after the 1540s. Around Newfoundland 500 or more boats annually were fishing for cod and some fishermen were trading for furs, especially at Tadoussac on the Saint Lawrence.

== 17th century ==
Early European Settlements in North America
Year	Settlement	Nationality / Notes
1604	St. Croix Island	French
1605	Port Royal (Annapolis Royal)	French
1607	Jamestown	English, first permanent English settlement
1607	Popham Colony	English
1608	Quebec	French
1609	New York Harbor	Dutch
1610	Cuper's Cove	English
1610	Kecoughtan, Virginia	English
1610	Santa Fe	Spanish
1611	Henricus	English
1612	Bermuda	English
1615	Fort Nassau	Dutch
1615	Renews, Newfoundland	English
1618	Bristol's Hope	English
1620	St. John's, Newfoundland	English
1620	Plymouth Colony	English
1621	Nova Scotia	Scottish
1622	Province of Maine	English
1623	Portsmouth	English
1623	Stage Point	English
1623	Dover	English
1623	Pannaway	English
1623	New Castle	English
1623	Fort Nassau	Dutch
1624	St. Kitts	English
1624	Governors Island	Dutch
1624	New Amsterdam	Dutch
1625	Cape Breton	Scottish
1626	Salem	English
1630	Massachusetts Bay Colony	English
1630	Pavonia	Dutch
1631	Saint John, New Brunswick	English
1632	Williamsburgh	English
1633	Fort Hoop	Dutch
1633	Windsor, Connecticut	English
1634	Maryland Colony	English
1634	Wethersfield	English
1634	La Baye (Green Bay)	French
1635	Territory of Sagadahock	English
1635	Saybrook Colony	English
1636	Providence Plantations	English
1636	Connecticut Colony	English
1638	New Haven Colony	English
1638	Fort Christina	Swedish
1638	Exeter	English
1638	Hampton, New Hampshire	English
1639	Bridgeport, Connecticut	English
1639	Newport	English
1639	San Marcos	Spanish
1640	New Stockholm	Swedish
1640	Swedesboro	Swedish
1642	Montreal	French
1642	Upland	Swedish
1651	Fort Casimir	Dutch
1652	York, Maine	
1653	Biddeford, Maine	
1658	Scarborough, Maine	
1660	Bergen	Dutch
1665	Elizabethtown	English
1666	Newark	English
1668	Sault Ste. Marie (Michigan)	French
1669	English Neighborhood	Dutch, English
1670	Charleston	English
1671	St. Ignace	French
1673	Prairie du Chien	French
1678	New Paltz, New York	French
1679	Acquackanonk	Dutch
1680	Fort Crevecoeur (Peoria, Illinois)	French
1680	El Paso	Spanish
1682	Pennsylvania	English
1683	Fort Saint Louis (Illinois)	French
1683	East New Jersey	Scottish
1684	Stuarts Town, Carolina	Scottish
1685	Fort Saint Louis (Texas)	French
1686	Arkansas Post	French
1691	Fort Pimiteoui	French
1696	Dorchester, South Carolina	English from Massachusetts
1698	Pensacola, Florida	Spanish
1699	Louisiana	French

== 18th century ==
Year	Settlement	Origin
1701	Detroit	French
1702	Mobile	French
1706	Albuquerque	Spanish
1711	Beaufort, South Carolina	English
1714	Natchitoches	French
1714	Germanna, Virginia	Germans from Hessen-Nassau
1716	Natchez	French
1717	Germanna, Virginia	Germans from Baden-Württemberg
1718	New Orleans	French
1718	San Antonio	Spanish
1721	Germanna, Virginia	Germans
1721	Greenland	Danish
1729	George Town, South Carolina	English and French Huguenots
1729	Baltimore	British
1733	Province of Georgia	British
1734	Culpeper, Virginia	Germans
1738	Culpeper, Virginia; some to Bethlehem, Pennsylvania	Germans
1741	Guanajuato	Spanish
1763	St. Louis (Missouri)	French
1769	San Diego	Spanish
1770	Monterey	Spanish
1775	Tucson	Spanish
1776	San Francisco	Spanish
1777	San Jose	Spanish
1781	Los Angeles	Spanish
1784	Kodiak Island	Russian
1791	Santa Cruz	Spanish
