= Spruce beer =

Beverage flavored with spruce

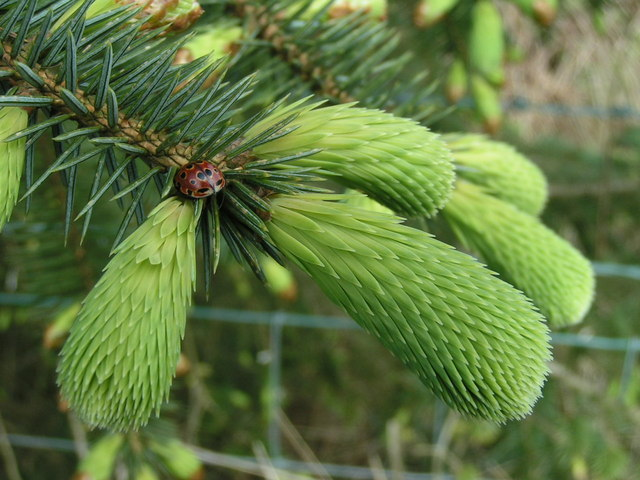
Spring growth on a spruce tree

Spruce beer is a beverage flavored with the buds, needles, or essence of spruce trees. Spruce beer can refer to either alcoholic or non-alcoholic beverages.

A number of flavors are associated with spruce-flavored beverages, ranging from floral, citrus, and fruity, to cola-like flavors to resinous and piney. This diversity in flavor likely comes from the choice of spruce species, the season in which the spruce ingredients are harvested, and the manner of preparation.

Using evergreen needles to create beverages was practiced in both Northern Europe and North America. Certain Indigenous peoples of North America used the drink as a cure for scurvy during the winter months when fresh fruits were not available, as the fresh shoots of many spruces and pines are a natural source of vitamin C. It may also have been brewed in Scandinavia prior to European contact with the Americas, but most French and British explorers were ignorant of its use as a treatment for scurvy when they arrived in North America. Jacques Cartier and his explorers were exposed to it as a tea when they arrived in Stadacona in what is now Quebec in 1535. European sailors adopted the practice and subsequently spread it across the world.

== History ==
=== North America and the Pacific ===
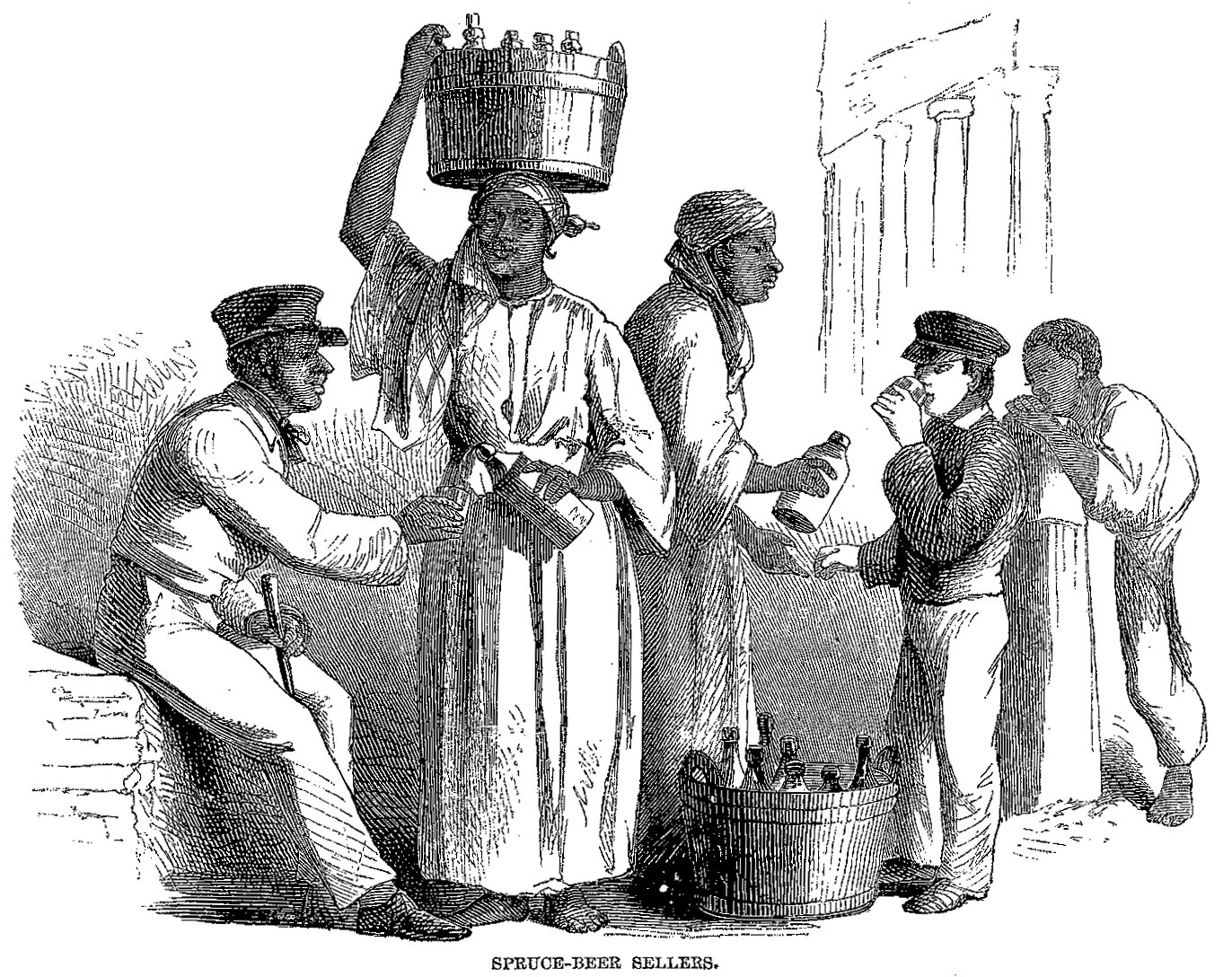
Spruce beer sellers in Jamaica, c. 1861

In 1536, the French explorer Jacques Cartier, exploring the St. Lawrence River, used the local natives' knowledge to save his men who were dying of scurvy. He boiled the needles of a tree the St. Lawrence Iroquoians called the aneda (probably Thuja occidentalis, commonly known as "eastern white cedar" and "arborvitae") to make a tea that was later shown to contain 50 mg of vitamin C per 100 grams. Such treatments were not available aboard ship, where the disease was most common. When Samuel de Champlain arrived 72 years later, he could not ask the locals which tree should be used, as the St. Lawrence Iroquoians had disappeared. This method of treating scurvy using evergreen-needle beverages was later picked up by the British Royal Navy, and spruce was regularly added to ship-brewed beer during eighteenth century explorations of the West Coast of North America and the wider Pacific, including New Zealand. Jane Austen, who had two brothers in the Royal Navy, refers to spruce beer in Chapter 40 of Emma.

Alcoholic spruce beer was common in the colonial United States and eastern Canada, made from red or black spruce. An American recipe from the 1796 edition of American Cookery by Amelia Simmons states:

Take four ounces [110 g] of hops, let them boil half an hour in one gallon [3.8 L] of water, strain the hop water then add sixteen gallons [61 L] of warm water, two gallons [7.6 L] of molasses, eight ounces [230 g] of essence of spruce, dissolved in one quart [0.95 L] of water, put it in a clean cask, then shake it well together, add half a pint [240 ml] of emptins, then let it stand and work one week, if very warm weather less time will do, when it is drawn off to bottle, add one spoonful of molasses to every bottle.

The Daily Order (11 June 1759) for the Highland Regiment in North America stipulated that: "Spruce beer is to be brewed for the health and conveniency of the troops which will be served at prime cost. Five quarts of molasses will be put into every barrel of Spruce Beer. Each gallon will cost nearly three coppers".

A Canadian recipe using similar ingredients for an unfermented tea from 1757 states:

It is made of the tops and branches of the spruces-tree, boiled for three hours, then strained into casks, with a certain quantity of molasses; and, as soon as cold, it is fit for use [...]

Today Sitka spruce, native to the northwest coast of North America, tends to be favored, although other species of spruce have also been used. Lighter, more citrus-like flavors are produced by using the bright green fresh spring growth before the new needles and twigs harden and become woody. Sitka spruce trees on the north-central Oregon Coast develop spring growth in early to mid-May.

== Modern types ==
=== Spruce as flavoring in barley-based beer ===
Spruce or other evergreens have sometimes been used as a flavoring ingredient in beer, such as Alba Scots Pine Ale, the Alaskan Brewing Company's Winter Ale, Beau's Brewery's Spruce Moose Pale Ale, and Yards Brewing Company's Poor Richard's Tavern Spruce. Banded Brewing in Biddeford, Maine brews a pale ale named Greenwarden every spring with Maine foraged white spruce tips. Portsmouth, New Hampshire's Earth Eagle Brewings combines locally foraged pine and spruce tips in their seasonal Connie Ferale amber. Tamworth Distilling in Tamworth, New Hampshire distills a spruce gin from foraged spruce tips also.

=== Re-creations of historic recipes ===
Very few modern beers are actually termed "spruce beer"; those that exist are often express attempts to create a historical recipe, which may be sugar-based or barley-based. One is Wigram Brewing Company's Spruce Beer, which is based on Captain Cook's first beer brewed in New Zealand in 1773; similarly, Yards Brewing Company says its Poor Richard's Tavern Spruce Ale is based upon a recipe for spruce beer recorded by Benjamin Franklin.

=== Spruce-flavored fermented beverages ===
Alcoholic spruce beer may also be made from sugar and flavoring from the spruce tree. Leaves, small branches, or extracted essence of spruce are boiled with sugar and fermented with yeast. Two different sources of sugar may be used, either molasses or white refined sugar. A recipe for home-brewing spruce beer of this type appeared in 1974 in Cape Breton's Magazine.

=== Soft drinks ===
In the Canadian provinces of Newfoundland and Quebec, where it is known in French as bière d'épinette, spruce beer may refer to either an artificially flavored non-alcoholic carbonated soft drink, or to genuine spruce beer. The latter is now made only by a few microbreweries.
