= Grand Portage State Park =

State park in Minnesota, United States

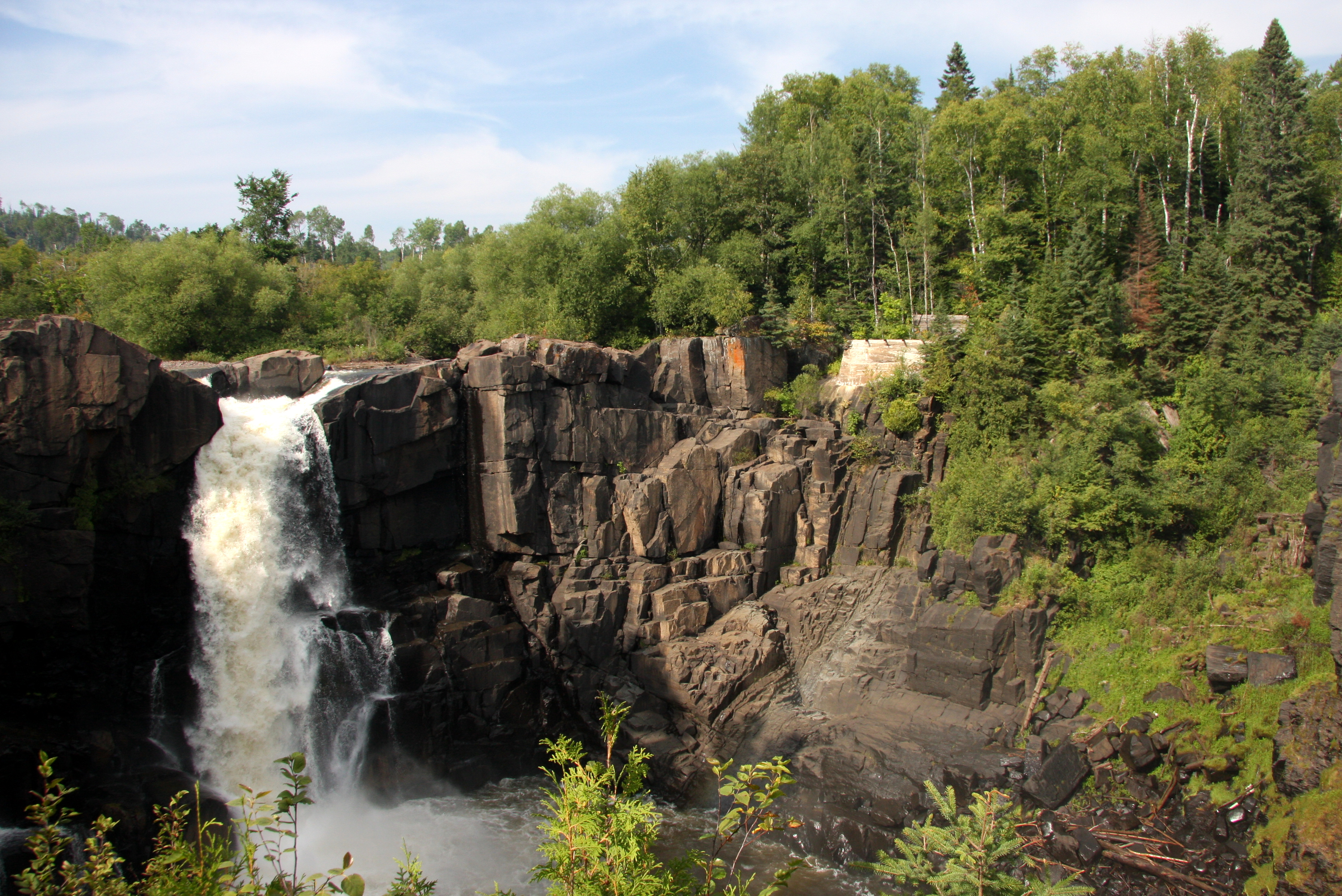
- High Falls of the Pigeon River in Grand Portage State Park

- Location within Minnesota Location within the United States
- Location: Cook, Minnesota, United States
- Coordinates: 48°0′37″N 89°36′43″W
- Area: 278 acres (113 ha)
- Elevation: 846 ft (258 m)
- Established: 1989
- Governing body: Minnesota Department of Natural Resources, Grand Portage Indian Reservation

Grand Portage State Park is a state park at the northeastern tip of the U.S. state of Minnesota, on the Canada–United States border. It contains a 120-foot (37 m) waterfall, the tallest in the state (though it is on the border with Canada and thus partially in Ontario), on the Pigeon River. The High Falls and other waterfalls and rapids upstream necessitated a historically important portage on a fur trade route between the Great Lakes and inland Canada. This 8.5-mile (13.7 km) path as well as the sites of historic forts at either end are preserved in nearby Grand Portage National Monument.

The state park, held by the surrounding Grand Portage Indian Reservation and leased to the state of Minnesota for $1 a year, is the only U.S. state park jointly managed by a state and a Native American band. It is also the only Minnesota state park not owned by the state.

== Natural history ==
=== Geology ===
During the Paleoproterozoic era from 2.2 to 1.9 billion years ago, mud and muddy sand accumulated on the bed of a shallow sea. These sediments compacted into layers of shale and graywacke. Dubbed the Rove Formation, they are among the oldest unmetamorphosed sedimentary rock on earth. 1.1 billion years ago the North American Plate began to crack in the middle, and lava flowed out of this Midcontinent Rift System creating the distinctive basalt of Lake Superior's North Shore (and Interstate Park to the south). In what is now Grand Portage State Park, upwelling magma did not reach the surface but intruded into fractures in the Rove Formation, cooling more slowly into diabase rather than basalt. One set of intrusions formed northeast-to-southwest trending sills while a later event formed northwest-to-southeast trending dikes. Together they are known as the Logan Intrusions after Canadian geologist William Edmond Logan.

From 2 million years ago to 10,000 years ago a series of glacial periods repeatedly covered the region with ice, scouring the bedrock and scooping out a great basin. The hard diabase intrusions were more resistant to the ice and survived as a network of ridges. At the end of the last glacial period the basin filled with meltwater, forming Glacial Lake Minong, Lake Superior's precursor. Freed from the weight of the glaciers, the surrounding land gradually rose. This post-glacial rebound plus draining of the lake caused the shoreline to recede, first exposing the ridges of the park as islands, then leaving the entire area above water. The stages of shoreline recession are revealed by lake terraces composed of beach gravels. The sharp drop from the surrounding land to the lake produces the numerous waterfalls for which the North Shore is famous.

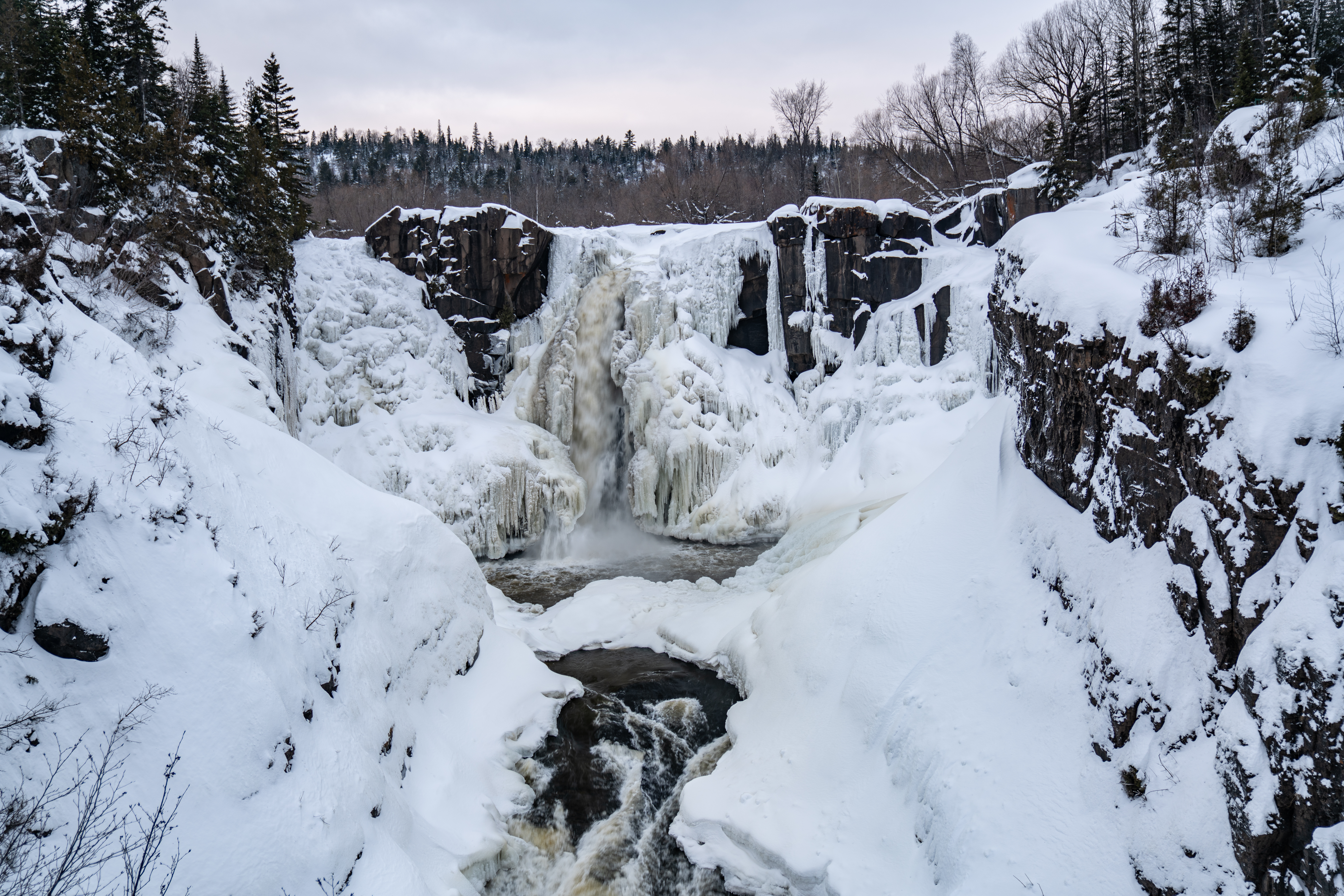
Winter Sunset at High Falls - Grand Portage State Park

The Pigeon River cut its course through soft sediments and glacial till. However it intersected two erosion-resistant dikes which created the High Falls and farther upstream the Middle Falls, which cascades 10 feet (3 m) then drops a further 20 feet (6 m). Below the High Falls the river has carved a deep gorge through the shale and greywacke of the Rove Formation. The U.S. Geological Survey estimated that 3,200 US gallons (12,000 L) of water flow over High Falls every second. On sunny days rainbows are often visible in the falls' mist. In winter ice can form on the falls 10 to 20 feet (3 to 6 m) thick, but water continues to flow underneath.

=== Flora ===
A mixed hardwood forest covers most of the park, chiefly paper birch and quaking aspen with occasional white spruce, eastern white pine, balsam fir, northern white cedar, poplar, and black ash. A more boreal forest appears on ridges and slopes, with black spruce joining the previously listed conifers intermixed with additional birch and aspen. Bottomlands near the river support black and green ash as well as white cedar, white spruce, and yellow birch.

=== Fauna ===
Mammalian species of this park include white-tailed deer, moose, Canadian lynx, black bear, red fox, porcupine, pine marten, river otter, beaver, snowshoe hare, skunk, and red squirrel with the occasional coyote and timber wolf. Waterfowl and raptors such as osprey frequent the Pigeon River, which also attracts walleye, northern pike, and rainbow smelt for their spring spawning.

== Cultural history ==
=== Early history ===
At the beginning of historical times Grand Portage and the Pigeon River lay along the border between Dakota land to the south and Cree to the north. By the early eighteenth century Ojibwe arrived in the area, expanding as middlemen in the fur trade with the French.

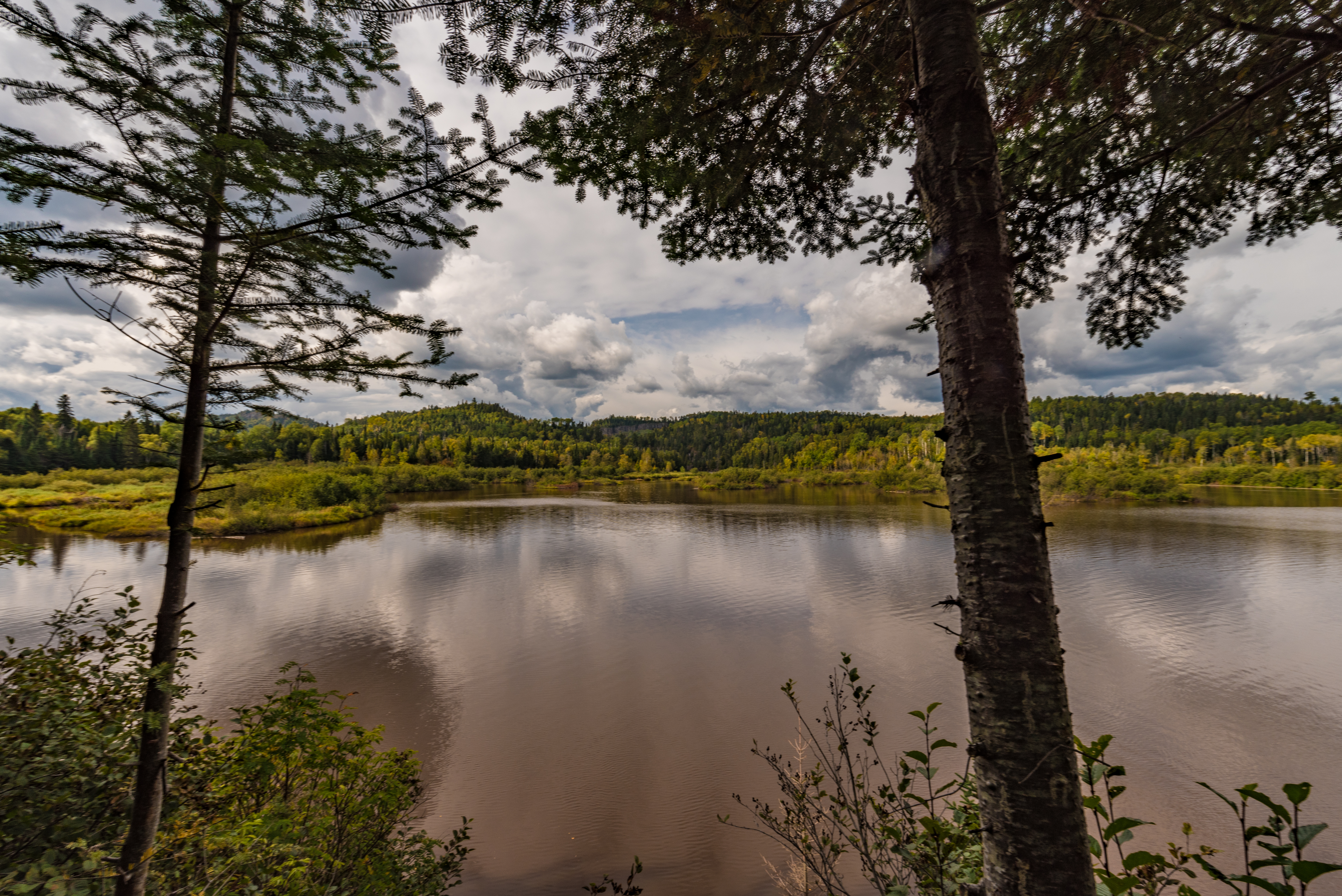
Pigeon River - above the rapids - Grand Portage State Park

The Pigeon River, an otherwise useful route from the Great Lakes to inland Canada, was impassable over its last 22 miles (35 km) due to the waterfalls and rapids. To avoid this stretch early native inhabitants developed a footpath known as Kitchi Onigaming in the Ojibwe language, a name translated by French commercial explorers as Grand Portage, or "the Great Carrying Place." While busy outposts sprang up at either end of the Grand Portage and along routes in the interior, the future Grand Portage State Park remained largely undeveloped.

The region was claimed by the French, then passed to the British following the French and Indian War under the 1763 Treaty of Paris. Following the independence of the United States the Arrowhead Region of Minnesota was disputed with British Canada. In 1842 the Webster–Ashburton Treaty finally settled the Pigeon River as the international border. When the U.S. began negotiating the 1854 Treaty of La Pointe with the region's Ojibwe, hard-bargaining Grand Portage band leaders such as Adikoons secured a reservation within their traditional territory instead of being displaced west.

The future state park was originally part of the reservation, but became tax-forfeit and was bought by whites. In the 1890s the Alger, Smith and Company began logging on both sides of the border. In 1899 a series of sluices, dams, and flumes were built to float the logs safely around the waterfalls and gorges; remains of the wooden timber slide around the High Falls are still visible on the Canadian side. The Pigeon River Lumber Company began operations in 1900 and within a few years the two companies had stripped the land of salable timber and moved away, leaving the area afflicted with unemployment, forest fires, and poor hunting. In the early twentieth century a remote fishing resort was located within the future park. In the 1930s plans were made to route Highway 61 across the Pigeon River at the High Falls, but conservation groups like the Izaak Walton League opposed the plan and the bridge and border crossing were ultimately built farther downstream in 1966.

=== State park creation ===
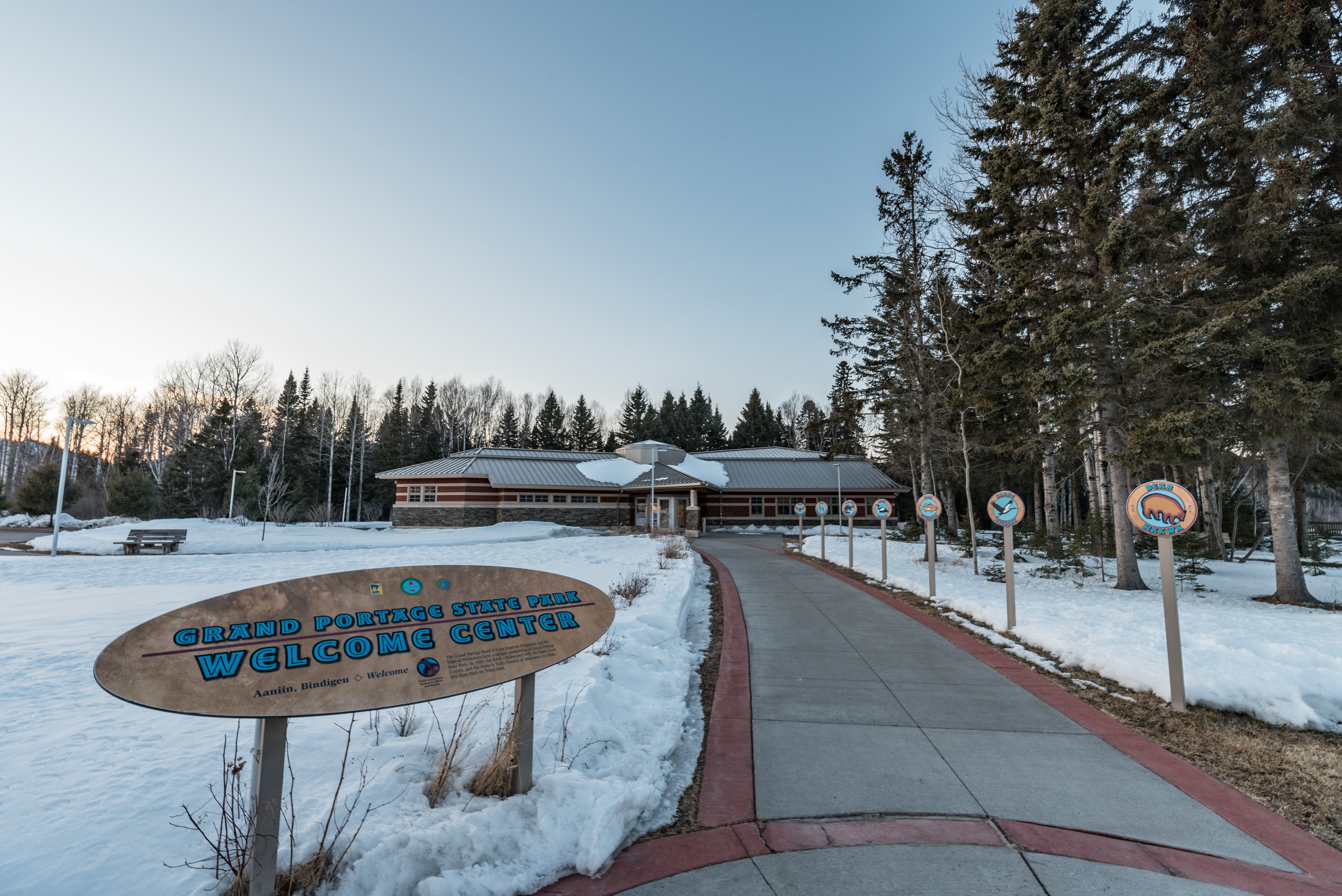
Grand Portage State Park Rest Area and Welcome Center

The land adjoining High and Middle Falls was purchased as a possible commercial property by Lloyd K. Johnson, a white attorney and land speculator from Duluth, who held onto it for decades. In 1985 a park advocacy group, the Minnesota Parks and Trails Council, suggested complementing Ontario's Pigeon River Provincial Park with a Minnesota state park. Johnson, who in the 1930s and 40s had sold hundreds of thousands of acres to the U.S. Forest Service to help create Superior National Forest and the Boundary Waters Canoe Area Wilderness, agreed to sell 178 acres (72 ha) and donate a further 129 acres (52 ha). The Parks and Trails Council raised Johnson's asking price of $250,000 through contributions from individuals and foundations and completed the sale in 1988.

The park is the only one in the country co-managed by a state and an Indian tribe, and the only Minnesota state park not owned by the state. Since the land was within the Grand Portage Indian Reservation, the state park bill was drafted with several provisions establishing a novel collaboration. Legislation establishing the park passed unanimously in both houses of the Minnesota Legislature in 1989. The Parks and Trails Council sold the land to the Minnesota Department of Natural Resources (DNR) for $316,000, an amount well under its appraised value. The DNR then began the complicated process of transferring the land to the Bureau of Indian Affairs, which would hold it in trust for the Grand Portage Band of Chippewa, who in turn would lease the park back to the DNR for $1 a year. Grand Portage State Park finally opened to the public in September 1994. It took so long to finalize the land deal that another entire Minnesota state park, Glendalough, had been authorized, developed, and dedicated in the meantime.

As a result of the COVID-19 pandemic in the United States, the Minnesota Department of Natural Resources temporarily closed Grand Portage State Park on April 10, 2020 at the request of the Grand Portage Band of Lake Superior Chippewa.

== Recreation ==
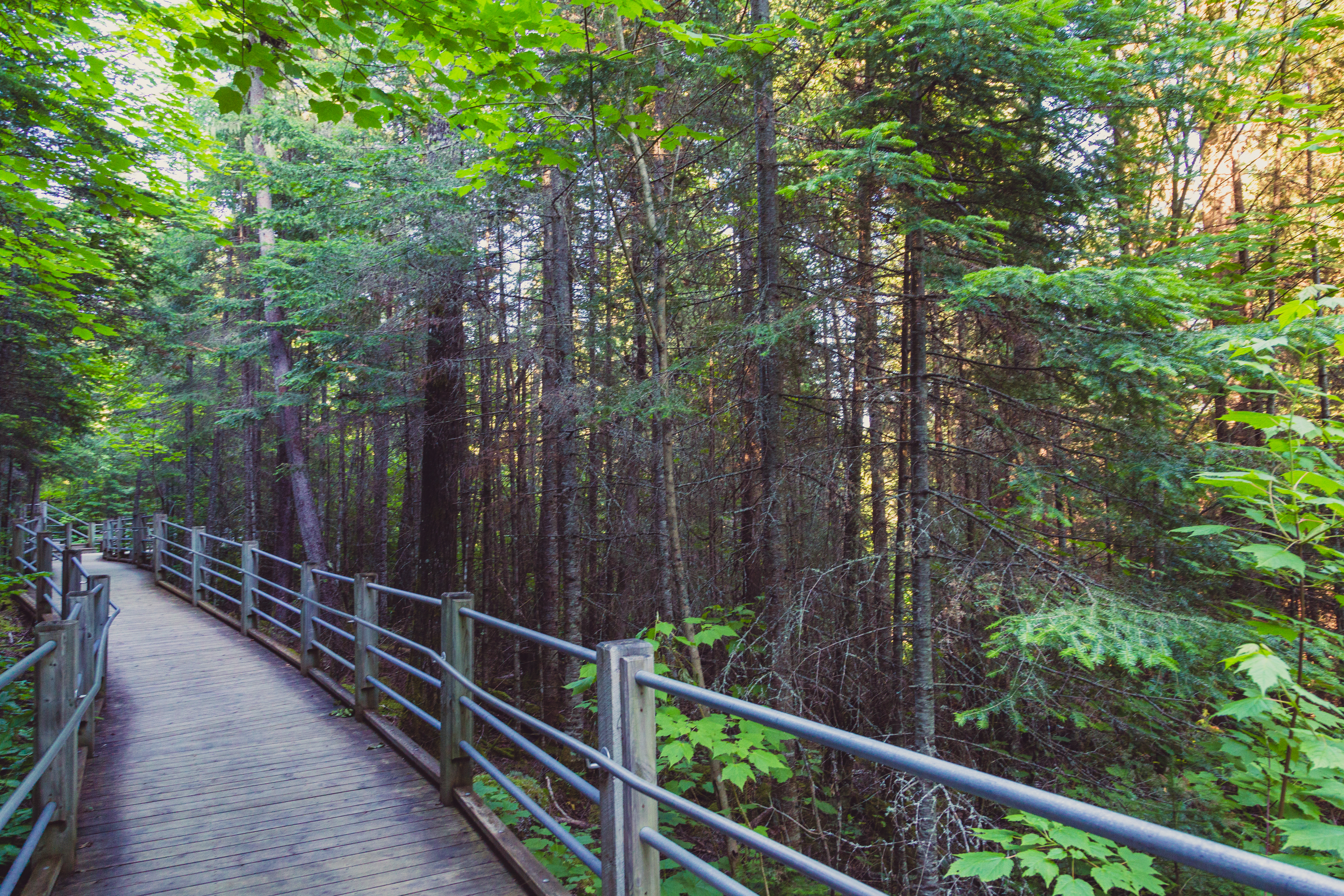
Grand Portage State Park High Falls boardwalk

The High Falls is at the end of a gentle 0.5-mile (0.8 km) paved trail and boardwalk. Three wooden decks provide different angles to view the falls. A further 3.5 miles (5.6 km) of hiking trail leads to the 30-foot (9 m) Middle Falls and provides distant views of Lake Superior and Isle Royale from hilltops. A 0.2-mile (0.3 km) path leads from the park office through the picnic area to a historic marker commemorating the Webster-Ashburton Treaty. In winter all of the trails are open for snowshoeing.

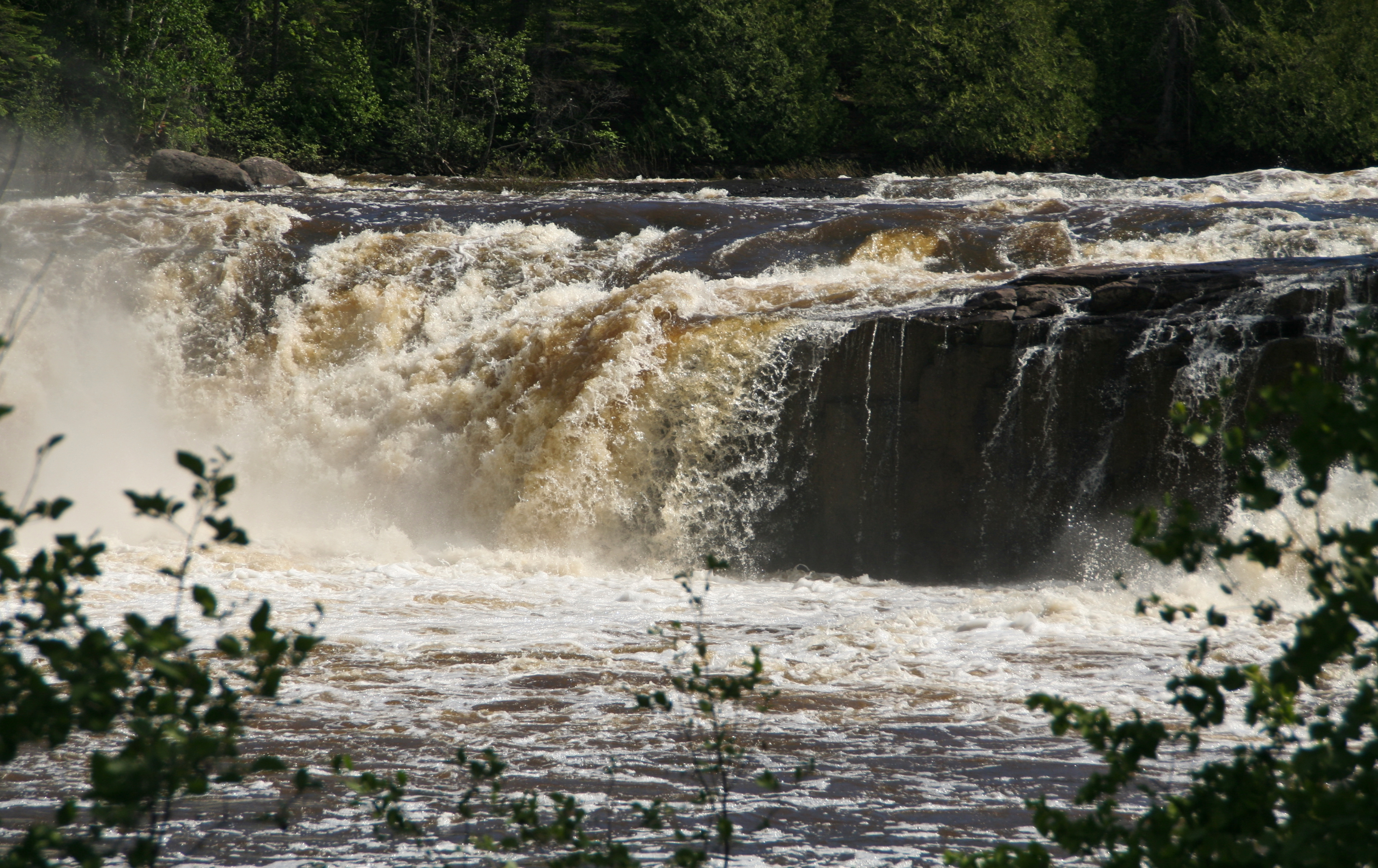
Middle Falls on the Pigeon River

Grand Portage State Park is developed for day-use only. The closest camping is in Ontario's adjacent Pigeon River Provincial Park or in the unincorporated community of Grand Portage, Minnesota.

The park emphasizes interpretation of Ojibwe cultural heritage, as a counterpoint to fur trade and natural history interpretation at nearby parks. Many park employees have been members of the Grand Portage Band.

The state park is located at the northern terminus of scenic Minnesota Highway 61. The park's seasonal visitor center was replaced in September 2010 with a 5,800-square-foot (540 m^{2}) combination visitor center, state travel information center, and highway rest area. It is staffed by Grand Portage Band members and contains exhibits interpreting Ojibwe life. The new facility complements the large travel center in Gooseberry Falls State Park, bookending the eight state parks along Minnesota's North Shore.

== International border ==
Grand Portage State Park follows two miles (3.2 km) of the Pigeon River, which marks the Canada – United States border. The U.S. Customs border checkpoint is visible from the park entrance and in fact sits within the park's authorized boundaries.

In September 2008 the park's rugged terrain defeated a rare illegal border crossing. Two Eastern Europeans were dropped off by a paid accomplice on the Canadian side of the border and waded across the Pigeon River near Middle Falls. They were supposed to hike through the park and rejoin their accomplice—who drove around through the checkpoint—in the parking lot. Instead the rough terrain exhausted them and they fled from the woods toward a nearby duty-free shop in front of Border Patrol officers, who took them into custody and alerted other agents who arrested the waiting driver.

Since the High Falls of the Pigeon River is shared with Ontario, the 70-foot (21 m) High Falls on the Baptism River in Tettegouche State Park is often touted as "the highest waterfall entirely within Minnesota."
