= Grand Portage National Monument =

- U.S. National Register of Historic Places
- U.S. Historic district
- U.S. National Monument
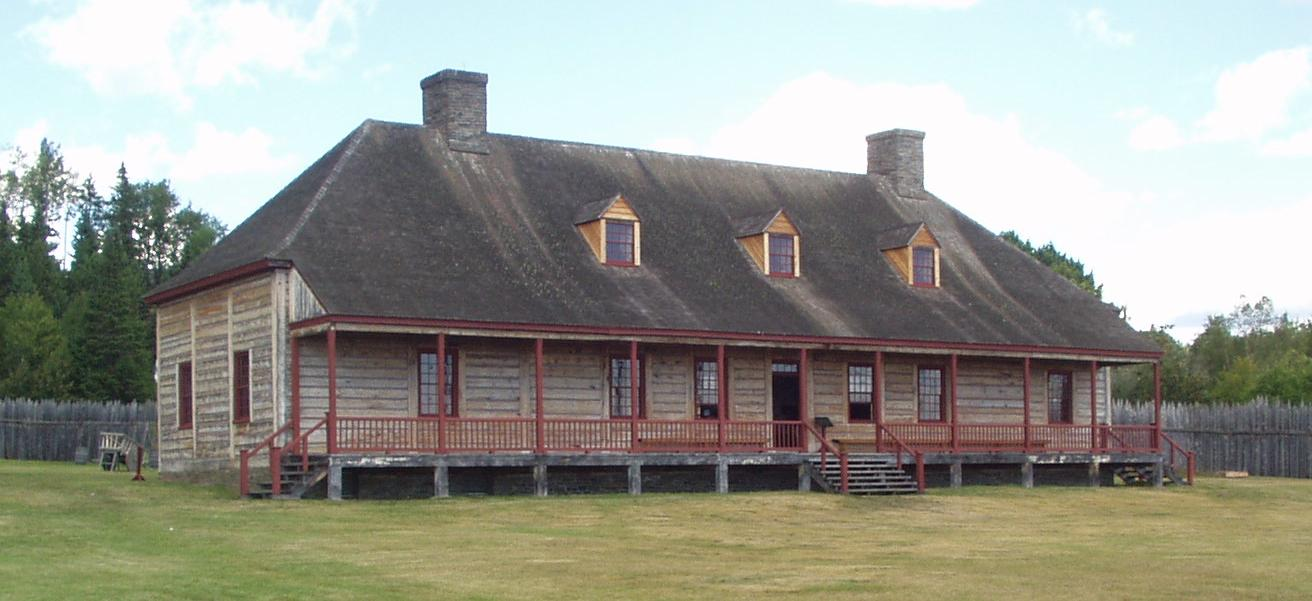
- The Great Hall at Grand Portage

- Location within Minnesota Location within the United States
- Interactive map of Grand Portage National Monument
- Location: Cook County, Minnesota
- Nearest city: Grand Portage
- Coordinates: 47°59′47″N 89°44′03″W
- Area: 710 acres (2.9 km^{2})
- Visitation: 85,734 (2025)
- Website: Grand Portage National Monument
- NRHP reference No.: 66000111

Significant dates
- Designated HD: October 15, 1966
- Designated NMON: January 27, 1960

Grand Portage National Monument is a United States National Monument located on the north shore of Lake Superior in northeastern Minnesota that preserves a vital center of fur trade activity and Anishinaabeg Ojibwe heritage. The area became one of the British Empire's four main fur trading centers in North America, along with Fort Niagara, Fort Detroit, and Michilimackinac.

The Grand Portage is an 8.5-mile (13.7 km) (2720 rod) footpath which bypasses a set of waterfalls and rapids on the last 20 miles (32 km) of the Pigeon River before it flows into Lake Superior. This path is part of the historic trade route of the French-Canadian voyageurs and coureur des bois between their wintering grounds and their depots to the east.

Composed of the Pigeon River and other strategic interior streams, lakes, and portages, this route was of enormous importance in pre-industrial times. It provided quick water access from Canada's settled areas and Atlantic ports to the fur-rich Rupert's Land and the North-Western Territory. Some 50 miles (80 km) upstream from Lake Superior, this trade route crosses the Height of Land Portage, on the Northern continental divide, and connects South Lake in the Pigeon River/Great Lakes watershed with North Lake of the Rainy River watershed. Grand Portage therefore was an essential link between the drainage basin of the Nelson River to Hudson Bay and that of the Saint Lawrence River to the Atlantic Ocean.

== History ==
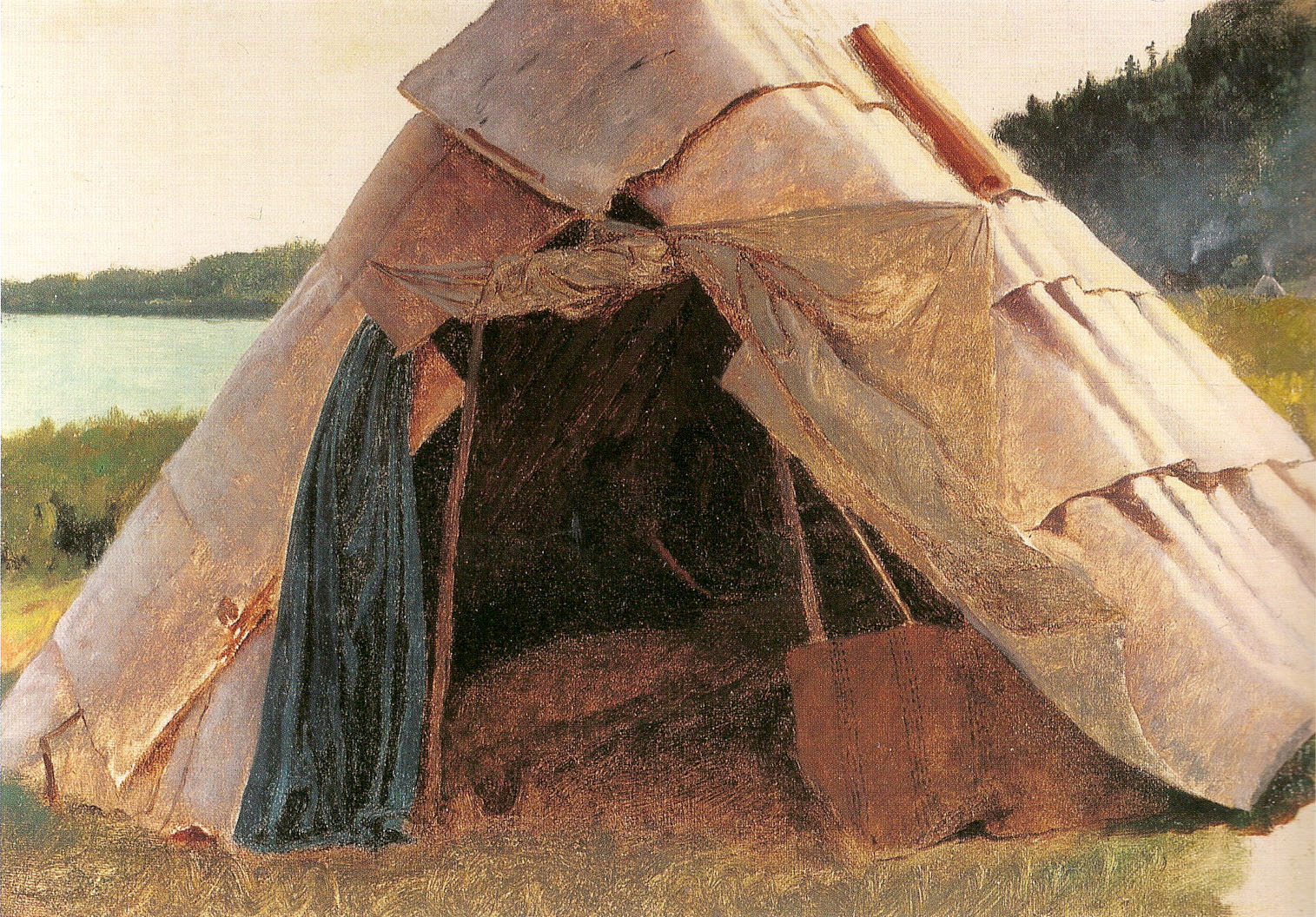
Ojibwe Wigwam at Grand Portage, painted by Eastman Johnson in 1857

As early as 2,000 years ago, Native American Nations probably used Gichi-onigaming, or "the Great Carrying Place", to travel from summer homes on Lake Superior to winter hunting grounds in the interior of Minnesota and Ontario. In 1729 Cree guide Auchagah drew a map for Pierre Gaultier de Varennes, sieur de La Vérendrye, one of the early French fur traders, showing how to reach the "western sea" of Lake Winnipeg. In time, Grand Portage became the gateway into rich northern fur-bearing country, where it connected remote interior outposts to lucrative international markets.

The Grand Portage trail is an 8.5-mile (13.7 km) trail connecting Grand Portage with Fort Charlotte on the Pigeon River. Voyageurs from the Rupert's Land would carry their furs by canoe to Fort Charlotte, and portage the bundles of fur to Grand Portage. There they met traders from Montreal, and exchanged the furs for trade goods and supplies. Each canoe "brigade" then returned to its starting place. The fur traders built Fort Charlotte as a trading fort at Grand Portage. There they built the Grand Hall in the French colonial style, which housed their meetings, a general store, and other facilities.

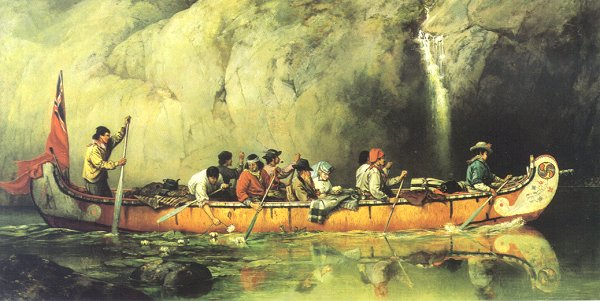
Canoe Manned by Voyageurs Passing a Waterfall (Ontario) painted by Frances Anne Hopkins in 1869

British operations in Grand Portage came under pressure after the signing of the Jay Treaty in 1795, the finalization of western portion of the U.S./Canada border in 1818, and gradual settlement of the Minnesota Territory by U.S. settlers. In mid-July 1802, partners of the North West Company, the most successful fur trade company in North America, met in their Grand Hall at Grand Portage. They voted to move their summer headquarters from the protected shores of Lake Superior's Grand Portage Bay 50 miles (80 km) north to the mouth of the Kaministiquia River. Almost from the time the British Nor'Westers had organized at Grand Portage in the mid-1780s, an emerging United States wanted them to stop competing with Americans in this territory.

The July vote meant that the North West Company would tear down its 18 buildings and transport the materials north in company schooners for use in constructing the planned new Fort William, far from U.S. soil. The buildings were constructed from native squared spruce, pine and birch and were surrounded by more than 2,000 cedar pickets.

In 1854 the Ojibwe signed a treaty with the U.S. establishing Grand Portage as part of their reservation. A school was established to educate the tribe members and a post office was created in 1856. In 1887 the government chose to abolish the reservation, opening it to general settlement.

In 1951 the property was designated as the Grand Portage National Historic Site and opened for visitors. In 1958, it was designated a National Monument. The portage trail has also been separately designated a Minnesota State Historic Site. The monument's 710 acres (2.9 km^{2}) lie entirely within the boundaries of the Grand Portage Indian Reservation. The depot was reconstructed to allow celebration of the fur trade and Ojibwe lifeways. It was added to the National Register of Historic Places in 1966.

== Attractions and events ==
The portage trail exists in much the same location and condition as in historic times. Visitors can hike 8.5 miles (13.7 km) from Lake Superior to the Pigeon River.

Volunteers and park staff at the monument dress in period attire. They staff the Kitchen, Great Hall, Canoe Warehouse, Ojibwe Village and Voyageur Encampment in and around the Stockade, and explain and interpret what life was like at the trading post at the turn of the 18th century. During the second weekend of August, the Grand Portage National Monument hosts a rendezvous re-enactment. At the same time, the Grand Portage Indian Reservation holds a pow wow, which attracts many Native American visitors. The Rendezvous and Pow Wow coincide with the Perseid meteor shower.

The four corner rooms off of the Great Hall are each decorated to represent a different aspect of the fur trade, including a shareholder's bedroom, a trading post with examples of furs and goods that would have been exchanged, a London streetscape with finished goods made from the furs that came through Grand Portage, and a hatter's shop showing the steps of turning beaver pelts into fine felt hats.

== Grand Portage National Monument Heritage Center ==
Grand Portage Indian Reservation (shown in taupe) and the Grand Portage National Monument (shown in green)

Opened in 2007, the Grand Portage National Monument Heritage Center features exhibit galleries about Ojibwe culture and the fur trade, a bookstore, multi-media programs, park offices, archives and a classroom. The center is a collaboration between the National Park Service and the Grand Portage Band of Lake Superior Chippewa. It overlooks the reconstructed fur trading post.

== Grand Portage ==
=== Voyageur route ===
This section covers the voyageur route from Grand Portage westward to the juncture of the route from Fort William at Lac La Croix. The Pigeon River is about 3 miles (5 km) directly north of the reconstructed fort. The Pigeon flows basically east and enters Lake Superior at a bay about 5 miles (8 km) east northeast. The portage trail meets the Pigeon about 9 miles (14 km) northwest at the former Fort Charlotte. The portage existed to bypass the river east of Fort Charlotte. From Fort Charlotte the canoe route then went west up the Pigeon past the mouth of the Arrow River to the east-west Mountain Lake. The old Native American route went north, with a drop of 125 feet (38 m), to the east-west Arrow Lake. The voyageurs, with their heavy freight canoes, cut a new route that ran west over the Petit Neuf or Watape Portage to Watape Lake which is in the Arrow River drainage. Then through the Petit Detroit to Rove Lake and the Grand Neuf or Long Portage to Rose Lake at the west end of Arrow Lake. From Rose Lake up the Arrow to South Lake. From South Lake north over the 700-yard Height of Land Portage to North Lake whose waters flow west to Lake Winnipeg. From here the route went west down through several rivers and numerous lakes to Lac La Croix where the route from Fort William came in. Lac La Croix is about 100 miles (160 km) west of Grand Portage and about 66 miles (106 km) west of Height of Land Portage.

=== Trail today ===
The Grand Portage was developed in order to avoid numerous short portages. Beginning at the stockade on Grand Portage Bay of Lake Superior, the 8.5-mile (13.7 km) trail leads westward into the wilderness to a mid-point on the Pigeon River, bypassing numerous rapids and a variety of waterfalls. (The most notable are Middle Falls and Pigeon Falls. Both are part of the Grand Portage State Park and are within the Rove Formation. Middle Falls is most easily seen from Pigeon River Provincial Park on the Canadian side of the border.)

The portage begins on Lake Superior, elevation 600 feet (180 m), rising as it moves westward through two notches in the Sawtooth Mountain range. It briefly levels off around 1,000 feet (300 m) after 2.6 miles (4.2 km). Another 1.5 miles (2.4 km) you reach the inland county highway. From here, the trail is more level, rising to 1,300 feet (400 m), the highest location on the trail, before dropping back to 1,260 feet (380 m) at Fort Charlotte on the Pigeon River. The trail's high point is the head of a drainage flowing to the Pigeon River at Fort Charlotte. The headwaters has become a large beaver pond. The dam is located along the trail route and has a boardwalk atop it, added for modern visitors.

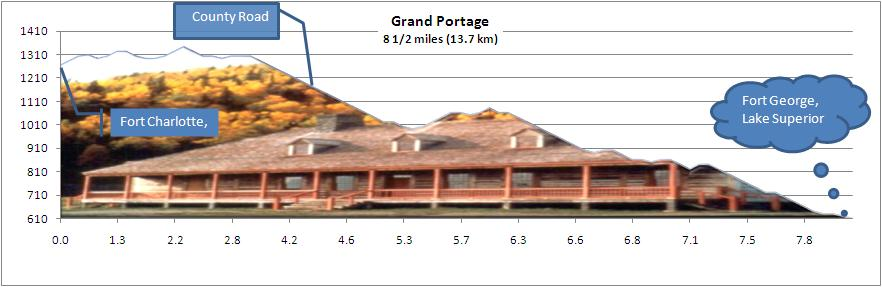
Trail contours of the Grand Portage. The vertical scale is exaggerated 30 times the horizontal scale.

== Archeology ==
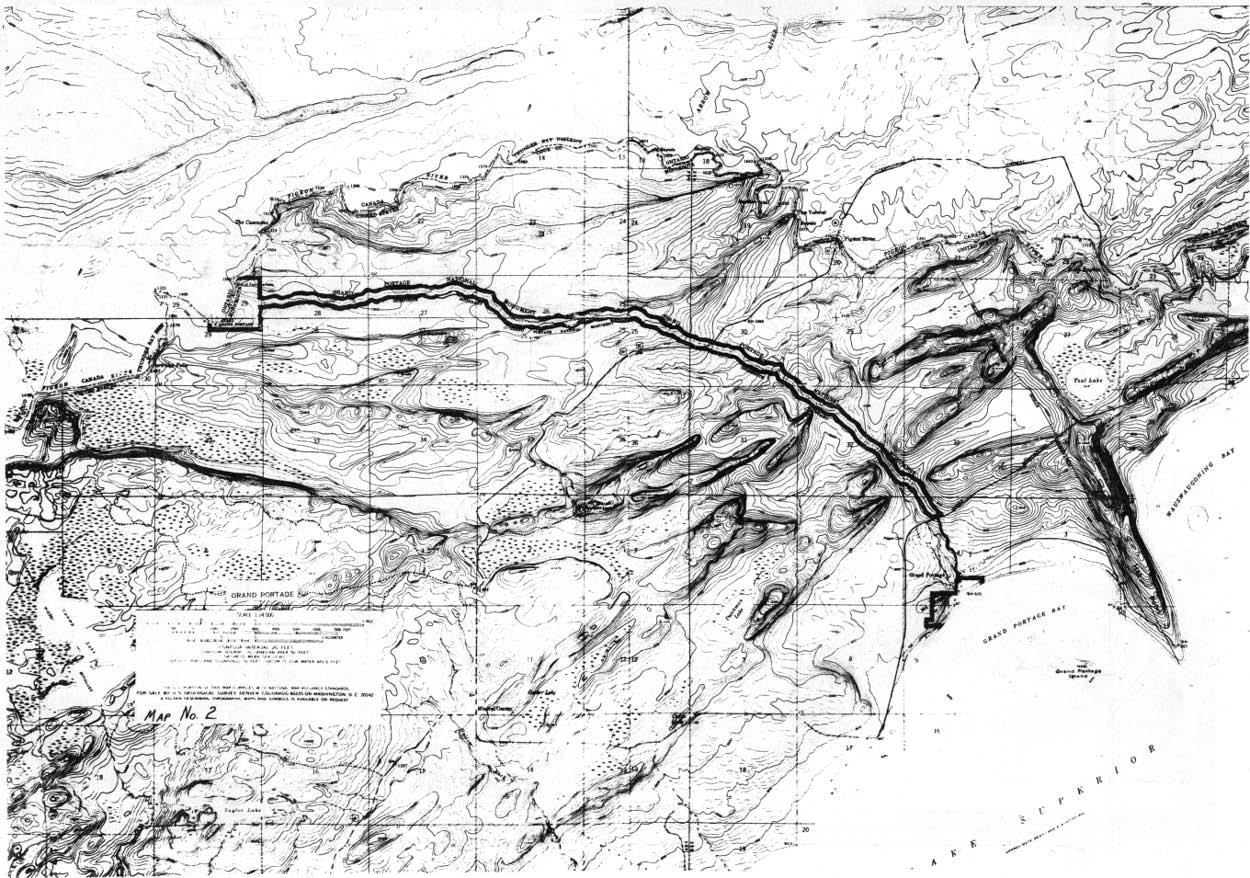
The Route of the Portage

Almost all the information known about the physical layout of Grand Portage National Monument comes from archeological studies.

- Cooper, David J., Of Sextants and Satellites: David Thompson and the Grand Portage GIS Study CRLS Colloquium, Kenora, Ontario, Canada, 2004.
- Hamilton, Scott, Graham, James, Norris, Dave, "If These Walls Could Speak:" Using GIS to Explore the Fort at Grand Portage National Monument, Department of Anthropology, Lakehead University, Thunder Bay Ontario, Canada, 2004.
- Birk, Douglas A., Archeologist/Historian, Grand Portage National Monument Maintenance Area Preliminary Survey, February 2006.
- Clark, Caven, Ph.D., Late Prehistoric Cultural Affiliation Study, Grand Portage National Monument, Prepared by Archeological Consulting Services, Ltd., Tempe, Arizona, November 9, 1999
- Woolworth, Alan R., An Historical Study of the Grand Portage, Grand Portage National Monument, Minnesota, Minnesota Historical Society, St. Paul, Minnesota, 1993
- Woolworth, Alan. Archaeological Excavations at the North West Company's Depot, Grand Portage, Minnesota in 1970–1971 (1975)
- Woolworth, Alan. Archaeological Excavations at Grand Portage National Monument: 1963–1964 Field Season (1969)
- Woolworth, Alan. Archaeological Excavations at Grand Portage National Monument: 1962 Field Season (1968)
- Woolworth, Alan. Archaeological Excavations at the North West Company's Fur Trade Post, Grand Portage, Minnesota, in 1936–1937 (1963)

== Route west ==
John McDonell, a clerk for the North West Company, identified the routes between Grand Portage and Rainy Lake in the 1790s. Henry Hind in 1860 traced the route and provided more details than provided by McDonell.

Name	Length	Distance from Lake Superior	Comments
Grand Portage	8.16 miles	8.16 miles	
Pigeon River	1.52	9.66	
Partridge Portage	0.25	9.91	
Pigeon River	4.25	14.16	
Décharge	0.25	14.41	
Pigeon River	1.75	16.16	
Décharge	0.35	16.51	
Pigeon River	3.13	19.64	
Fowl Portage	1.13	20.77	
Fowl Lake	4.55	25.32	
Moose Portage	0.41	25.73	
Moose Lake	4.25	29.98	
Great Cherry Portage	0.48	30.46	
Lake	0.25	30.71	now known as "Vaseux Lake"
Mud Portage	0.15	30.86	now known as "Vaseux Portage"
Lake	0.30	31.16	now known as "Fan Lake"
Lesser Cherry Portage	0.13	31.29	
Mountain Lake	7.81	39.10	
Watap Portage	0.30	39.40	
Watap Lake	3.70	43.10	western part now known as "Rove Lake"
Great New Portage	1.46	44.56	now known as "Long Portage"
Rose Lake	3.0	47.56	
Portage	0.01	47.57	
Mud Lake	2.62	50.19	now known as "Rat Lake"
Portage	0.21	50.40	
South Lake	2.84	53.24	
Height of Land Portage	0.26	53.50 miles (86.10 km)	
Gun Flint Lake E.	2.77	56.27	now known as "North Lake"
Décharge	0.01	56.28	
Gun Flint Lake W.	8.92	65.20	now known as simply "Gunflint Lake"
Rpd	0.01	65.21	
Lake Strait	0.25	65.46	
Little Rock Portage	0.02	65.48	
Lake Strait	0.75	66.23	
Rapid	0.01	66.24	
Lake Strait	0.25	66.49	
Mid-Fall Portage	0.06	66.55	
Lake Strait	0.25	66.80	
Island Portage	0.29	67.09	
Lake	1.35	68.44	
Rapid	0.02	68.46	
Lake	0.85	69.31	
Rapid	0.07	69.38	
Lake Strait	0.75	70.13	
Rapid	0.05	70.18	
Lake Strait	0.50	70.68	
Rapid	0.40	70.72	
Lake Strait	0.20	70.84 [sic]	
Rapid	0.01	70.85	
Lake Strait	0.45	71.05	
Rapid	0.01	71.06	
Lake Strait	0.70	71.51 [sic]	
Rapid	0.02	71.53	
Lake	5.35	76.88	
Décharge	0.05	76.93	
Lake Strait	—	77.63	
Portage	0.01	77.64	
Lake Seiganagh	10.07	87.71	
Portage	0.01	87.72	
Swamp Lake	0.82	88.54	
Swamp Portage	0.24	88.78	
Cypress Lake	5.35	94.13	
Portage	0.02	94.15	
Knife Lake	10.70	104.85	
Portage	0.04	104.89	
Lake Strait	0.20	105.09	
Portage	0.09	105.18	
Lake	0.60	105.78	
Carp Portage	0.15	105.93	
Birch Lake	4.0	109.03	
Portage	0.11	110.04 [sic]	
Basswood Lake	16.00	126.04	
Portage	0.10	126.14	
Lake Strait	0.25	126.39	
Fir Portage	0.20	126.59	
Lake Strait	0.22	126.81	
Rapid	0.04	126.85	
Lake Strait	0.35	127.20	
Rapid	0.02	127.22	
Lake Strait	1.50	128.72	
Portage	0.07	128.79	
Lake	0.65	129.44	
Portage	0.09	129.53	
Crooked Lake	16.80	146.33	
Curtain-Fall Portage	0.10	146.43	
Rapid	0.03	146.46	
Iron Lake	4.50	150.96	
Bottle Portage	0.25	151.21	
Nequaquon Lake	22.10	173.31	
Portage	0.02	173.43	
Lake	5.60	179.03	
Portage	0.15	179.18	
Lake Strait	0.50	179.68	
Portage	0.04	179.72	
Loon's Narrows	7.60	187.32	
Sand Point Lake	9.67	196.99	
Nameukan Lake	5.20	202.19	
Nu. Portage	0.08	202.27	
Lakelet	0.25	202.52	
Portage	0.14	202.66	
Lake Strait	5.20	207.86 miles (334.52 km)	

== Image gallery ==
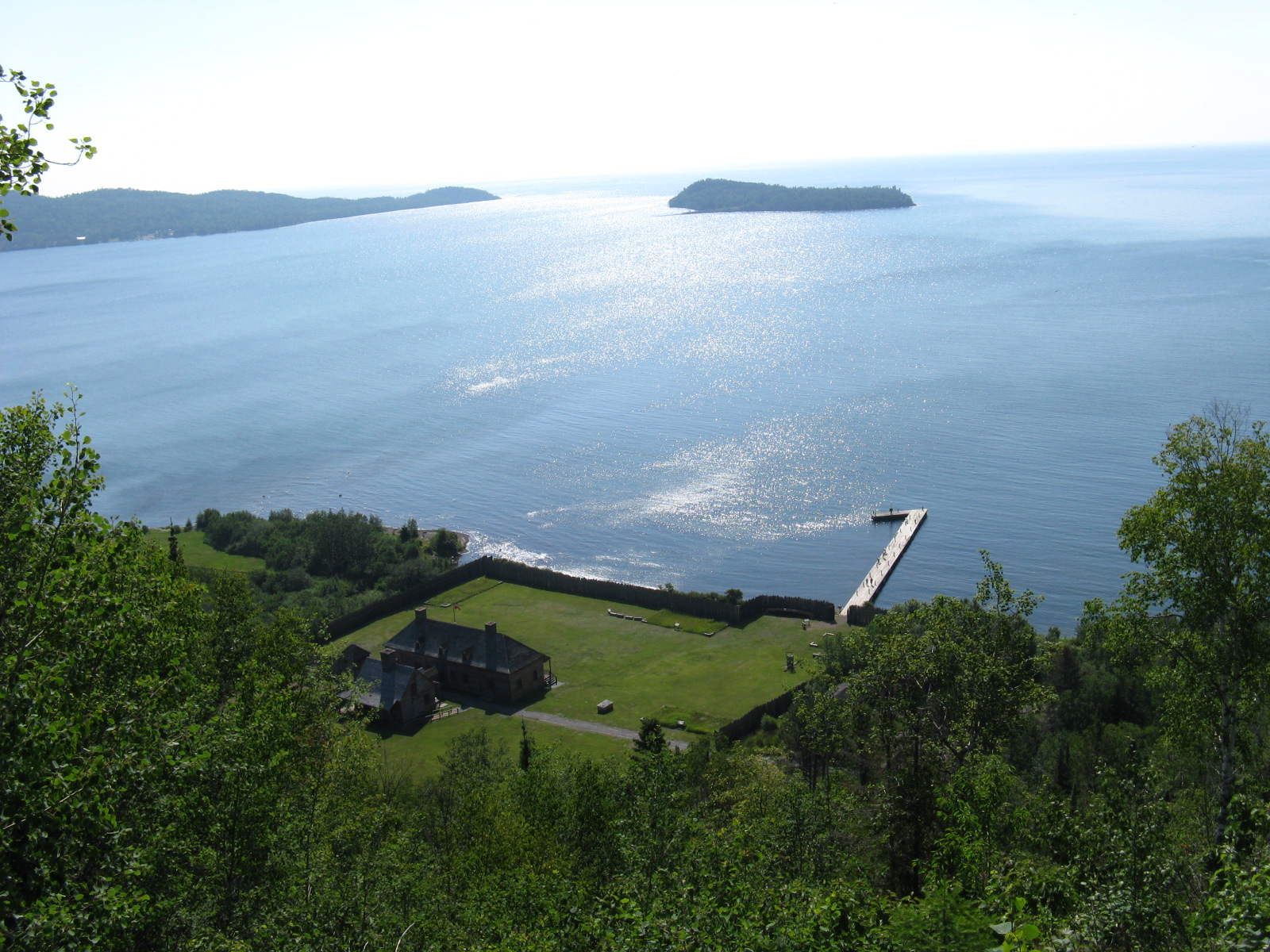
The Grand Portage depot and dock as seen from the top of Mount Rose

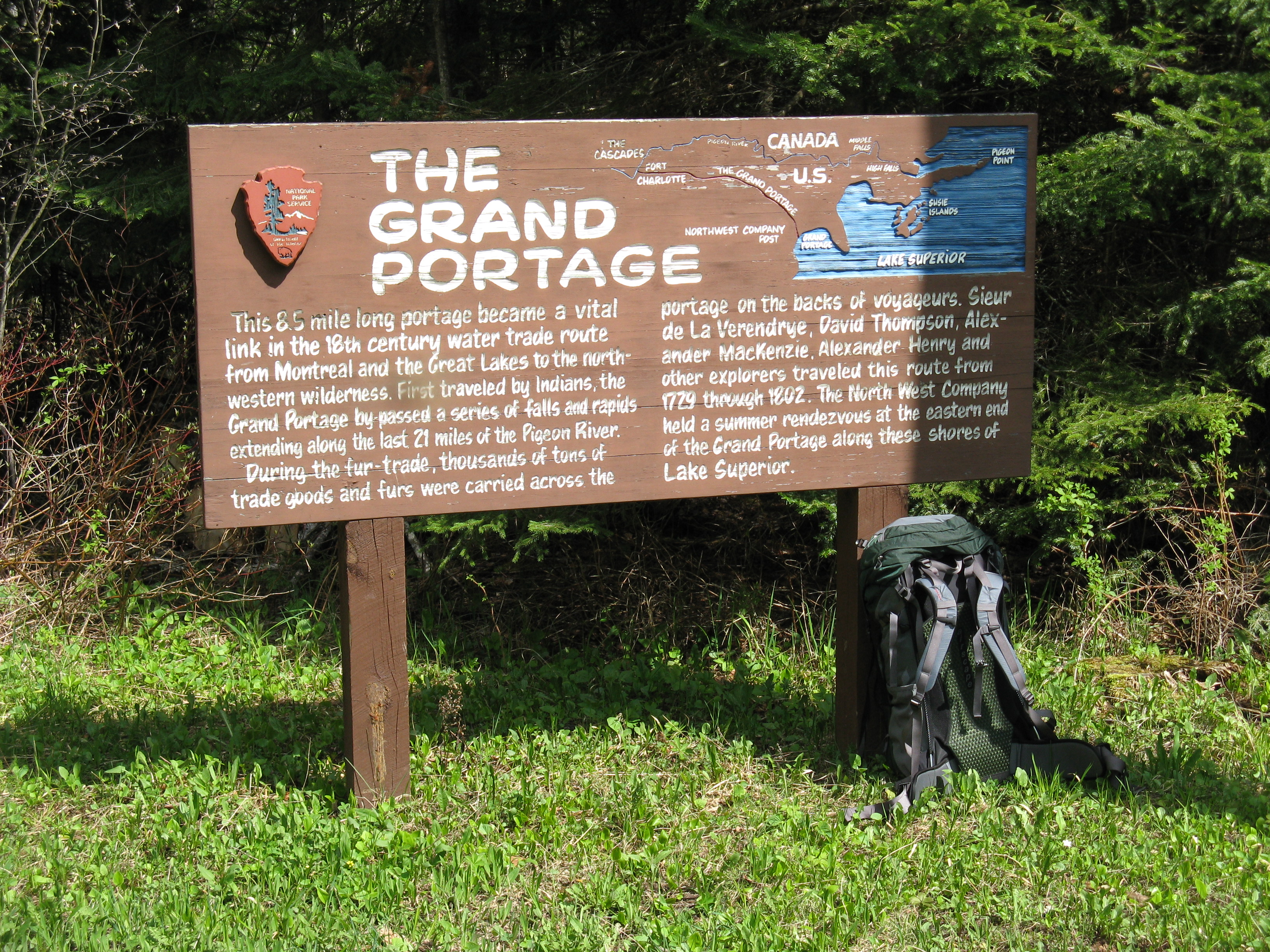
Informational sign located at the midway point of the Grand Portage Trail

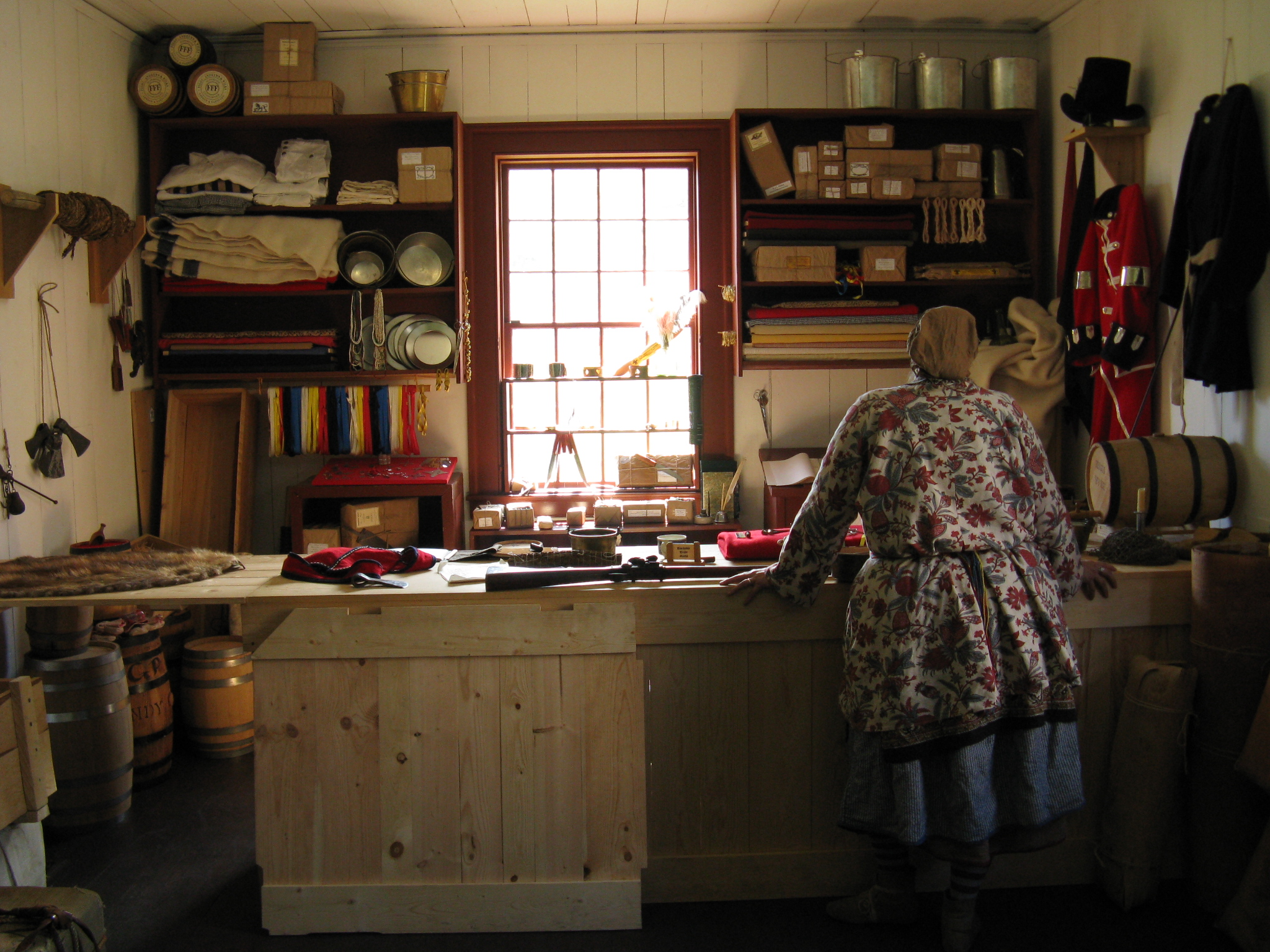
A visiting reenactor in the reconstructed trade shop located in the Great Hall

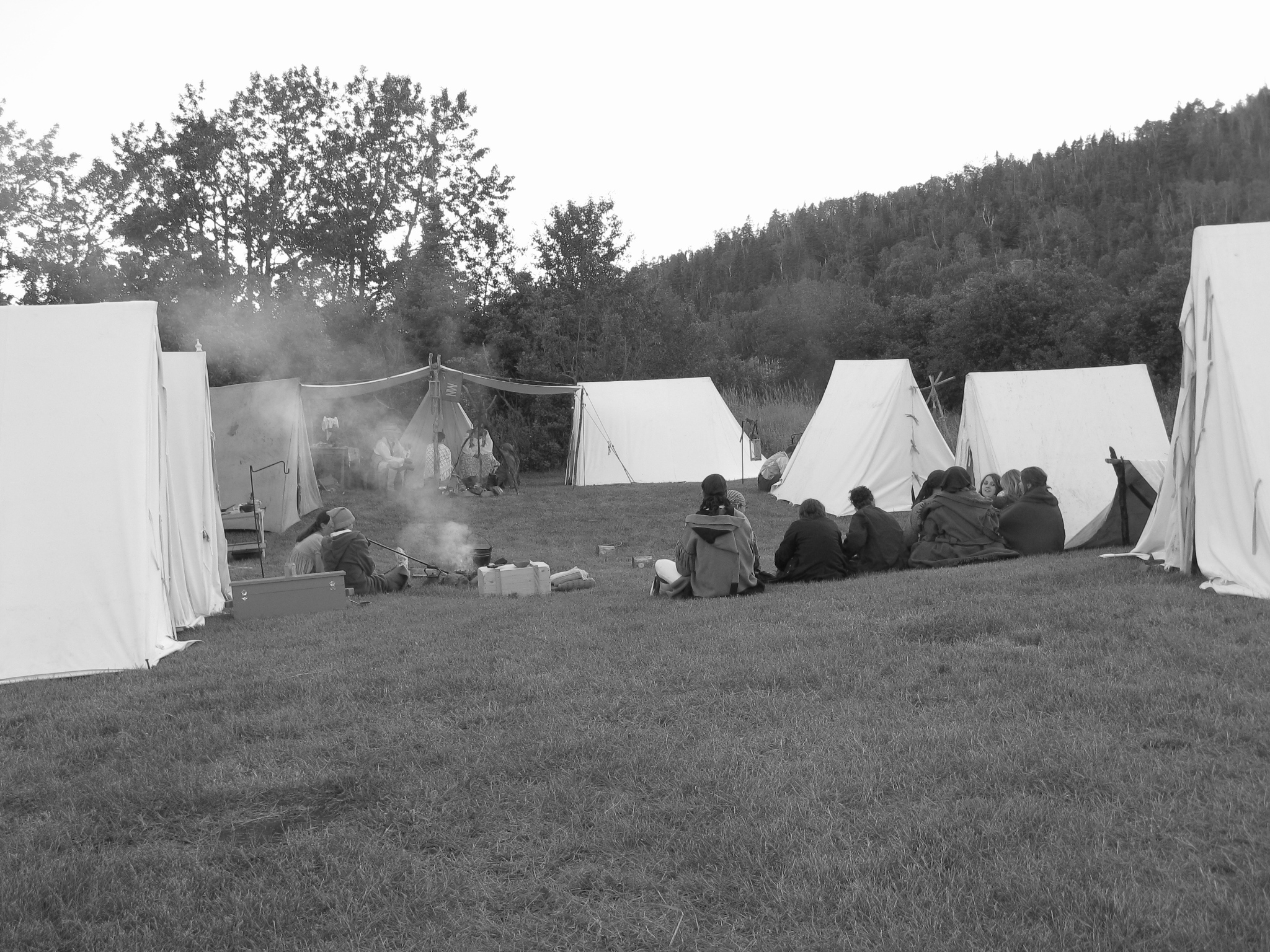
Rendezvous camp at Grand Portage August 2008

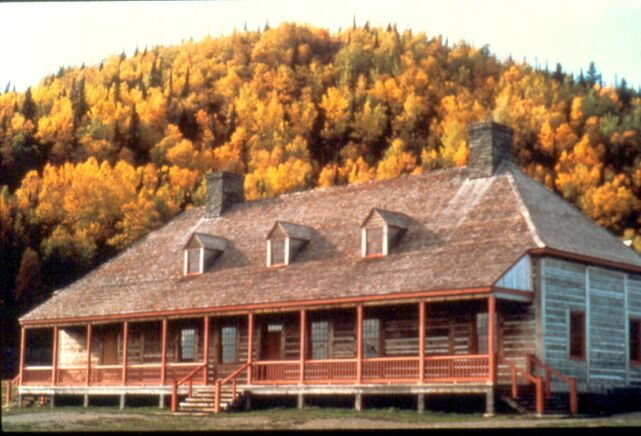
Great Hall in the fall of 1983. Mount Rose rises behind the hall.

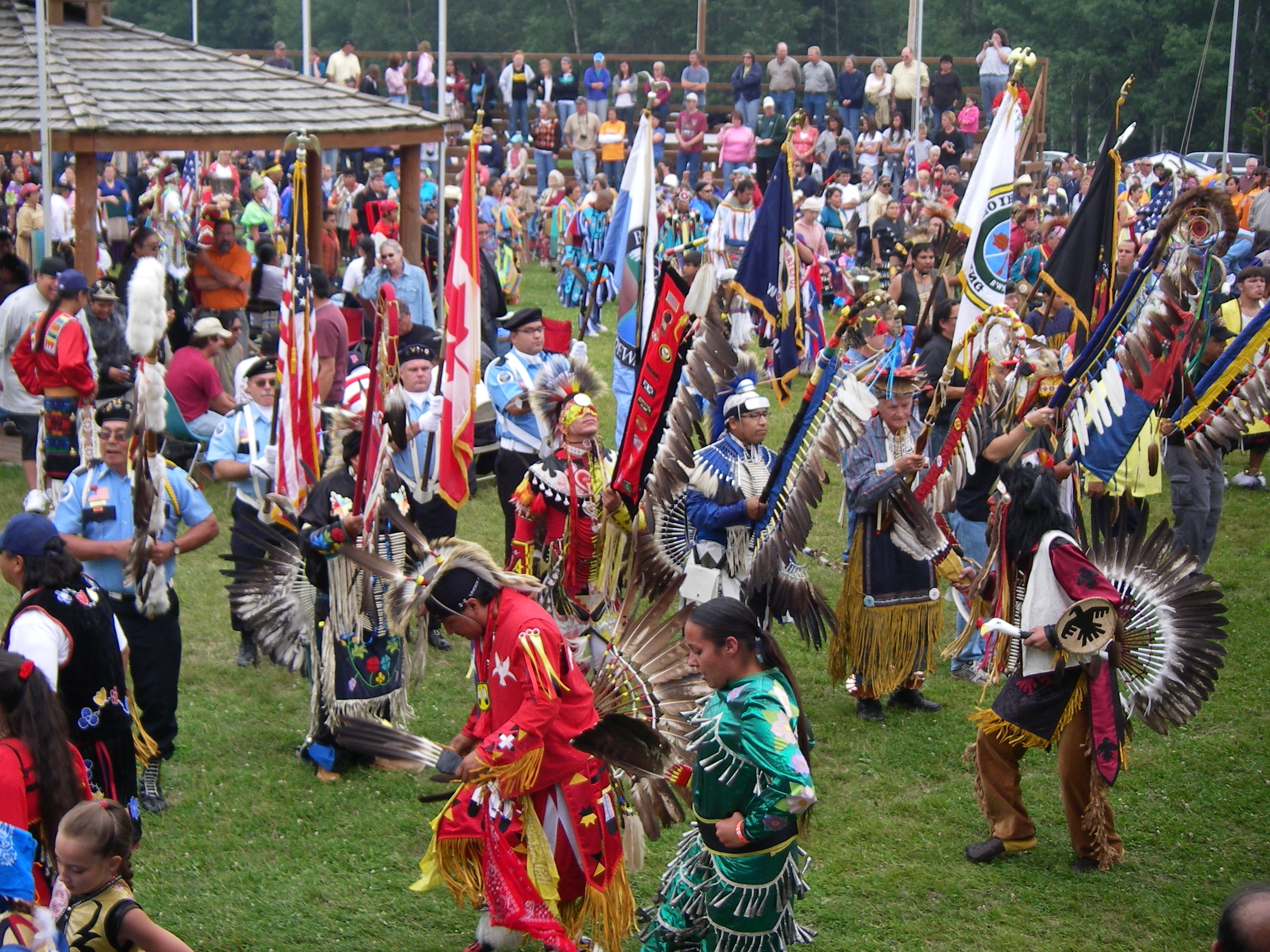
Lake Superior Band of Chippewa Pow Wow at the Grand Portage Indian Reservation in 2009

== See also ==
- List of national monuments of the United States
- Coureur des bois
- Fur trade
- Fort William Historical Park
- Grand Portage, Minnesota – Unorganized Territory of Cook County
- Grand Portage Indian Reservation
- Grand Portage State Park, Minnesota
- Grand Portage (community), Minnesota – Unincorporated community located within both the reservation and unorganized territory
- Indiana Dunes National Lakeshore and the Joseph Bailly Homestead
- Isle Royale National Park
- Joseph Bailly
- North West Company
- Pigeon River
- Territorial era of Minnesota
- Voyageurs
- Witch Tree
