= St. Lawrence Iroquoians =

Indigenous people of east-central North America (c. 1300s to 1580)

Total population
- 0

Regions with significant populations
- St. Lawrence River

Languages
- Laurentian

The St. Lawrence Iroquoians were an Iroquoian Indigenous people who existed until about the late 16th century. They concentrated along the shores of the St. Lawrence River in present-day Quebec and Ontario, Canada, and in the American states of New York and northernmost Vermont. They spoke the Laurentian language, a branch of the Iroquoian family.

The Pointe-à-Callière Museum estimated their numbers as 120,000 people in 25 nations occupying an area of 230,000 square kilometres (89,000 sq mi). However, many scholars believe that this estimate of the number of St. Lawrence Iroquoians and the area they controlled is too expansive. The current archaeological evidence indicates that the largest known village had a population of about 1,000 and their total population was 8,000–10,000. The traditional view is that they disappeared because of late 16th-century warfare by the Mohawk nation of the Haudenosaunee or Iroquois League, which wanted to control trade with Europeans in the valley.

Knowledge about the St. Lawrence Iroquoians has been constructed from the studies of surviving oral accounts of the historical past from the current Native people, writings of the French explorer Jacques Cartier, earlier histories, and anthropologists' and other scholars' work with archaeological and linguistic studies since the 1950s.

Archaeological evidence has established that the St. Lawrence Iroquoians were a people distinct from the other regional Iroquoian peoples, the Five Nations of the Haudenosaunee and the Wendat (Huron). However, recent archaeological finds suggest distinctly separate groups may have existed among the St. Lawrence Iroquoians as well. The name "St Lawrence Iroquoians" refers to a geographic area in which the inhabitants shared some cultural traits, including a common language, but were not politically united.

The name of the country of Canada is probably derived from the Iroquoian word kanata, which means village or settlement.

== Historical issues ==
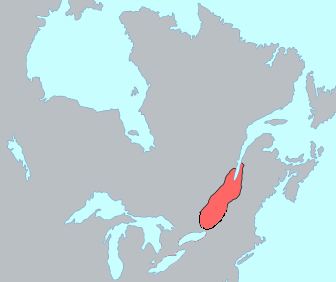
Territory occupied by the St. Lawrence Iroquoians, circa 1535

For years historians, archeologists and related scholars debated the identity of the Iroquoian cultural group in the St. Lawrence valley which Jacques Cartier and his crew recorded encountering in 1535–36 at the villages of Stadacona and Hochelaga. An increasing amount of archaeological evidence collected since the 1950s has settled some of the debate. Since the 1950s, anthropologists and some historians have used definitive linguistic and archaeological studies to reach consensus that the St. Lawrence Iroquoians were peoples distinct from nations of the Haudenosaunee Confederacy or the Wendat. Since the 1990s, they have concluded that there may have been as many as 25 tribes among the St. Lawrence Iroquoians, who numbered anywhere from 8,000 to 10,000 people. They lived in the river lowlands and east of the Great Lakes, including in present-day northern New York and Vermont.

Before this, some scholars argued that the people were the ancestors or direct relations of historic Iroquoian groups in the greater region, such as the Wendat or Mohawk, Onondaga or Oneida of the Five Nations of the Haudenosaunee encountered by later explorer Samuel de Champlain. Since the 18th century, several theories have been proposed for the identity of the St. Lawrence River peoples. The issue is important not only for historical understanding but because of Haudenosaunee and other indigenous land claims.

In 1998, James F. Pendergast, a Canadian archeologist, summarized the four major theories with an overview of evidence:

- Huron-Mohawk Option:
  Several historians combined data from early French reports, vocabulary lists, and oral histories of accounts by Native tribes to theorize the early inhabitants were Iroquoian-speaking Wendat (Huron) or Mohawk, two tribes well known in later colonial history. There has not been sufficient documentation to support this conclusion according to 20th-century standards. In addition, archaeological finds and linguistic studies since the 1950s have discredited this theory.
- Mohawk Identity Option:
  Based in part on material from the 18th century, Mark Cleland Baker and Lars Sweenburg developed a theory that the Mohawk (in some cases, they also postulated Onondaga and Oneida) had migrated and settled in the St. Lawrence River valley before relocating to their historic territory of present-day New York. Pendergast says that attribution of Stadacona or Hochelaga as Mohawk, Onondaga or Oneida has not been supported by the archaeological data.
  "Since the 1950s a vast accumulation of archaeological material from Ontario, Quebec, Vermont, Pennsylvania and New York State consistently has provided compelling evidence to demonstrate that neither the Mohawk, the Onondaga, nor the Oneida homelands originated in the St Lawrence Valley."
- Laurentian Iroquoian and Laurentian Iroquois Identity: based on language studies, with material added since 1940;

and

- St. Lawrence Iroquoian and St. Lawrence Iroquois Identity:

Since the 1950s, anthropologists, archaeologists, linguists and ethnohistorians have combined multidisciplinary research to conclude that "a wholly indigenous and discrete Iroquoian people were present in the St Lawrence Valley when Cartier arrived. The current anthropological convention is to designate these people St Lawrence Iroquoians, all the while being aware that on-going archaeological research indicates that several discrete Iroquoian political entities were present in a number of widely dispersed geographical regions on the St Lawrence River axis."

As noted, anthropologists and some historians have used definitive linguistic and archaeological studies to reach consensus that the St. Lawrence Iroquoians were a people distinct from nations of the Haudenosaunee Confederacy or the Wendat, and likely consisted of numerous groups. Pendergast notes that while Iroquoians and topical academics have mostly reached consensus on this theory, some historians have continued to publish other theories and ignore the archaeological evidence. The St. Lawrence Iroquoians did share many cultural, historical, and linguistic aspects with other Iroquoian groups; for example, their Laurentian languages were part of the Iroquoian family and aspects of culture and societal structure were similar.

The St. Lawrence Iroquoians appear to have disappeared from the St. Lawrence valley some time prior to 1580. Champlain reported no evidence of Native habitation in the valley. By then the Haudenosaunee used it as a hunting ground and avenue for war parties.

As the historian Pendergast argues, the determination of identity for the St. Lawrence Iroquoians is important because, "our understanding of relations between Europeans and Iroquoians during the contact era throughout Iroquoia hinges largely upon the tribe or confederacy to which Stadacona and Hochelaga are attributed."

== Culture and subsistence ==
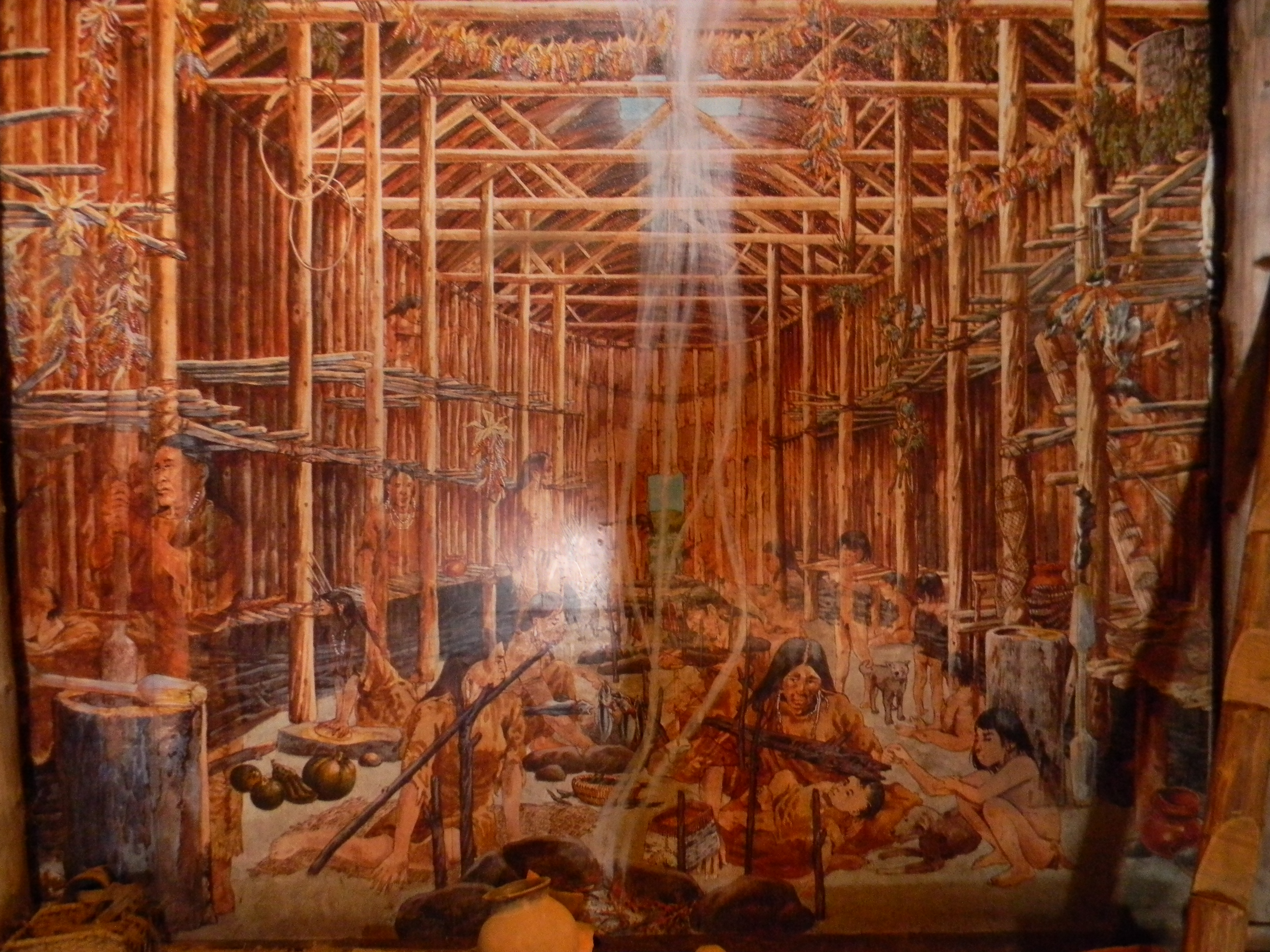
An artist's conception of the interior of an Iroquoian longhouse.

Prehistoric Iroquoian culture and maize agriculture in Canada is first detected by archaeologists in 500 CE at the Princess Point site in Hamilton, Ontario. Iroquoian culture is detected in the Saguenay River region of Quebec in about 1000 CE. By 1250 or 1300 maize was being grown in what would become the Quebec City area. By about 1300, four distinct subculture areas of St. Lawrence Iroquoian culture existed: (1) Jefferson County, New York with a population of about 2,500; Grenville County, Ontario with a population of 2,500; the Lake St. Francis basin west of Montreal with a population of 1,000; and the Montreal and Quebec city areas with a population of 2,000 to 3,000. There were also settlements in northernmost Vermont and neighboring Ontario near Lake Champlain.

Most of the St. Lawrence Iroquoian villages were located in inland locations a few kilometers (miles) from the river itself. By the end of the 15th century they were encircled by earthworks and palisades, indicating a need for defense. The villages usually were 2 hectares (4.9 acres) to 3.25 hectares (8.0 acres) in area. Inside the palisades the St. Lawrence people lived in longhouses, typical of other neighboring Iroquoian peoples. The longhouses were 18 metres (59 ft) to 41 metres (135 ft) in length and each housed several families. Archaeologists have estimated that villages had an average population of 150-250 people although a few larger villages housed considerably more.

The Iroquoians occupied their villages for ten or more years until their longhouses deteriorated and the fertility of the soil for their crops declined. Then, they built a new village and cleared land for crops, usually only a few miles from their previous home. The frequent changes of location has given problems to archaeologists in estimating the numbers on the St. Lawrence Iroquoian people. Dating techniques may not be precise enough to determine whether villages were occupied simultaneously or sequentially.

In addition to the characteristic villages, the St. Lawrence Iroquoian peoples had "a mixed economy, in which they drew their subsistence from growing maize, squash, and beans, hunting, fishing, and gathering. These nations also had in common a matrilineal, clan-based social organization, and a political system sufficiently structured to permit confederation at times. Most of them engaged in guerrilla warfare, grew and used tobacco, and produced pottery vessels." Some of the oldest Iroquoians artifacts found surrounding what is now Quebec City include copper axe heads from c.1000-400 BCE and terracotta vessels from c.1350-1600. Sunflowers were also grown for their oily seeds. Investigations at several former settlements have indicated that their most important foods were maize and fish. They hunted white-tailed deer and other game.

In 1535, French explorer Jacques Cartier commented on cultural differences between the people of Hochelaga (Montreal area) and Stadacona (Quebec area). Cartier described the large and productive maize fields surrounding Hochelaga, and said its inhabitants were sedentary, as compared to the people of Stadacona who were migratory. The Stadaconans were closer to the salt-water resources (fish, seals, and whales) of the lower St. Lawrence River and the Gulf of St Lawrence and ranged widely in their birch bark canoes in search of marine animals. Moreover, the Quebec area was the most northerly location in northeastern North America in which agriculture was practiced, especially during the cooler temperatures of the Little Ice Age in the 16th century. For Stadaconans, depending on agriculture was a riskier subsistence strategy than for the people of Hochelaga and they probably relied less on agriculture and more on exploitation of sea mammals, fishing, and hunting.

The St. Lawrence Iroquoians were not united politically and villages and cultural groups may have been unfriendly and competitive with each other, as well as being hostile to the neighboring Algonquian peoples and other Iroquoian groups.

== European contacts ==
Breton, Basque, and English fishermen may have come into contact with the St. Lawrence Iroquoians early in the 16th century. French navigator Thomas Aubert visited the area in 1508 and sailed 80 leagues, perhaps 350 kilometres (220 miles), through the Gulf of St Lawrence and into the St. Lawrence River. He took back to France seven natives, possibly Iroquoians, whom he had captured during his voyage.

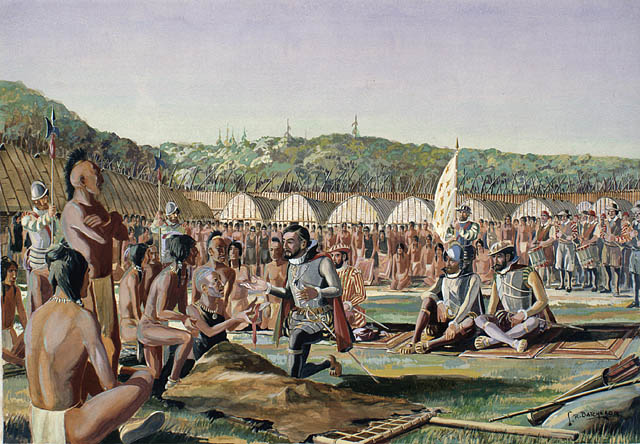
Jacques Cartier at Hochelaga.

Jacques Cartier was the first European definitively known to have come in contact with the St. Lawrence Iroquoians. In July 1534, during his first voyage to the Americas, Cartier met a group of more than 200 Iroquoians, men, women, and children, camped on the north shore of Gaspe Bay in the Gulf of St Lawrence. They had traveled in 40 canoes to Gaspé to fish for Atlantic mackerel which abounded in the area. They were more than 600 kilometres (370 mi) from their home of Stadacona, on the site of present day Quebec City. In the Iroquoian language, Stadacona means "high rock" to reflect the topography of the city.The Stadaconians met the French "very familiarly" probably indicating previous trading contacts with Europeans.

In his follow-up expedition of 1535 and 1536, Cartier visited several Iroquoian villages north of Île d'Orléans (near present-day Quebec), including the villages of Stadacona and Hochelaga in the vicinity of modern-day Montreal. Archaeologists in the 20th century have unearthed similar villages further southwest, near the eastern end of Lake Ontario and are finding evidence of additional discrete groups of St. Lawrence Iroquoians.

At just about the period Jacques Cartier contacted them, Basque whalers started to frequent the area in yearly campaigns (peaking at around 1570–80), holding friendly commercial relations with Saint Lawrence Iroquoians and other natives. The Basques referred to them as Canaleses, probably derived from the Iroquoian word "kanata" which means settlement or village. Basques and American natives of the Labrador-Saint Lawrence area developed a simplified language for the mutual understanding, but it shows a strong Mi'kmaq imprint.

== Demise ==
The archaeologist Anthony Wonderley found 500-year-old ceramic pipes in present-day Jefferson County, New York that were associated with the St. Lawrence Iroquoians and the tribes of the Haudenosaunee. Their use appear to have been related to diplomatic visits among the peoples, and he suggests they indicate a territory of interaction that may have preceded the Haudenosaunee confederacy. Related design elements and long recounting in Haudenosaunee oral histories have been significant.

By the time the explorer Samuel de Champlain arrived and founded Quebec in 1608, he found no trace of the St. Lawrence Iroquoians and settlements visited by Cartier some 75 years earlier. Historians and other scholars have developed several theories about their disappearance: devastating wars with the Haudenosaunee to the south or with the Wendats to the west, the impact of epidemics of Old World diseases, or their migration westward toward the shores of the Great Lakes. Innis guessed that the northern hunting Indians around Tadoussac traded furs for European weapons and used these to push the farming Indians south.

Archaeological evidence and the historical context of the time point most strongly to wars with the neighbouring Haudenosaunee state, particularly the Mohawk. Located in eastern and central New York, they had the most to gain in war against the St. Lawrence Iroquians, as they had the least advantageous territorial position in the area in relation to hunting and the fur trade along the St. Lawrence River. French trading was then based at Tadoussac, downstream at the mouth of the Saguenay River, within the territory of the Innu. The Mohawk wanted to get more control of the St. Lawrence trade routes connecting to the Europeans. During this period, Champlain reported that the Algonquian peoples were fearful of the powerful Haudenosaunee. The anthropologist Bruce G. Trigger believes the political dynamics were such that the Huron were unlikely to enter Haudenosaunee territory to carry out an attack against the St. Lawrence people to the north. In the mid- to late-16th century, the St. Lawrence Valley was likely an area of open conflict among tribes closer to the river. Because nothing remained of their settlements, the St. Lawrence Iroquoians appeared to have been overwhelmed by other groups. Some St. Lawrence Iroquoian survivors may have joined the neighbouring Mohawk and Algonquin tribes, by force or by mutual agreement.

By the time Champlain arrived, the Algonquins and Mohawks were both using the Saint-Lawrence Valley for hunting grounds, as well as a route for war parties and raiding. Neither nation had any permanent settlements upriver above Tadoussac, the trading post in the lower St. Lawrence Valley which had been important for years in the fur trade.

== Historical debates ==
Although historians and other scholars have been studying the St. Lawrence Iroquoians for some time, such knowledge has been slower to be part of common historical understanding. The hypothesis about the St. Lawrence Iroquoians helps explain apparent contradictions in the historical record about French encounters with natives in this area.

The origins of the word canada, from which the nation derived its name, offers an example of the changes in historical understanding required by new evidence. By canada, the St. Lawrence Iroquoians of Stadacona meant "village" in their language. Cartier wrote, "[I]lz (sic) appellent une ville Canada (they call a village 'Canada')". Cartier applied the word to both the region near Stadacona and the St. Lawrence River that flows nearby.

Both the Canadian Encyclopedia (1985) and various publications of the Government of Canada, such as "The Origin of the Name Canada" published by the Department of Canadian Heritage, suggest instead the former theory that the word "Canada" stems from a Huron-Iroquois word, kanata, that also meant "village" or settlement.

The account of Canada's name origin reflects theories first advanced in the 18th and 19th centuries. General texts have not kept up with the discrediting of such earlier theories by the linguistic comparative studies of the later 20th century. For instance, the "Huron-Iroquois theory" of word origin appeared in the article on "Canada" in the Encyclopædia Britannica of 1996.

The earlier mystery of annedda also shows how historical understanding has been changed by recent research. When Cartier's crew suffered scurvy during their first winter in Canada, the St. Lawrence Iroquoians provided them with a remedy, an herbal infusion made of the annedda. The French recorded this as the St. Lawrence Iroquoian name of the white cedar of the region. Cartier noted the word in his journal. On a later expedition when Champlain asked for the same remedy, the natives he met did not know the word annedda. This fact confused many historians. Given new evidence, it appears that Champlain met Five Nations Haudenosaunee who, although related, did not speak the same language as the St. Lawrence Iroquoians—thus, they did not know the word annedda and its reference.

Archaeologists have not determined the exact location of Hochelaga. In the early 20th century historians debated this vigorously and the reasons for its disappearance, but changing interests in the field led in other directions. In the late 20th century, First Nations activism, as well as increased interest in history of indigenous peoples renewed attention to the early St. Lawrence Iroquoian villages.

== Language ==
Linguistic studies indicate that the St. Lawrence Iroquoians probably spoke several distinct dialects of their language, often referred to as Laurentian. It is one of several languages of the Iroquoian language family, which includes Mohawk, Huron-Wyandot and Cherokee. Jacques Cartier made sparse records during his voyage in 1535-1536. He compiled two vocabulary lists totaling about 200 words. The St. Lawrence Iroquoians may have spoken two or more distinct languages in a territory stretching over 600 km, from Lake Ontario to east of Île d'Orléans.

== Legacy and honours ==
Extensive archaeological work in Montreal has revealed the 1,000-year history of human habitation on the site. In 1992 a new museum, Pointe-à-Callière (Montreal Museum of Archaeology and History), opened here to preserve the archaeology and mark new understandings of the city and the St. Lawrence Iroquoians.

Major exhibits have displayed the increasing knowledge about the St. Lawrence Iroquoians:

- 1992, Wrapped in the Colours of the Earth: Cultural Heritage of the First Nations, McCord Museum, Montreal, Quebec
- 2006-2007, The Saint Lawrence Iroquoians: Corn People, Pointe à Callière, Montreal Museum of Archaeology and History, Montreal, Quebec. (The exhibition catalogue was published as a book under the same name.)

== See also ==
- Haudenosaunee settlement of the north shore of Lake Ontario
- Pre-contact Indigenous Culture and the City’s Founding (1608) in Quebec City Art & Artists: An Illustrated History by Michèle Grandbois, 2025. Toronto: Art Canada Institute.
