= Witch Tree =

Sacred tree in Ojibwe culture

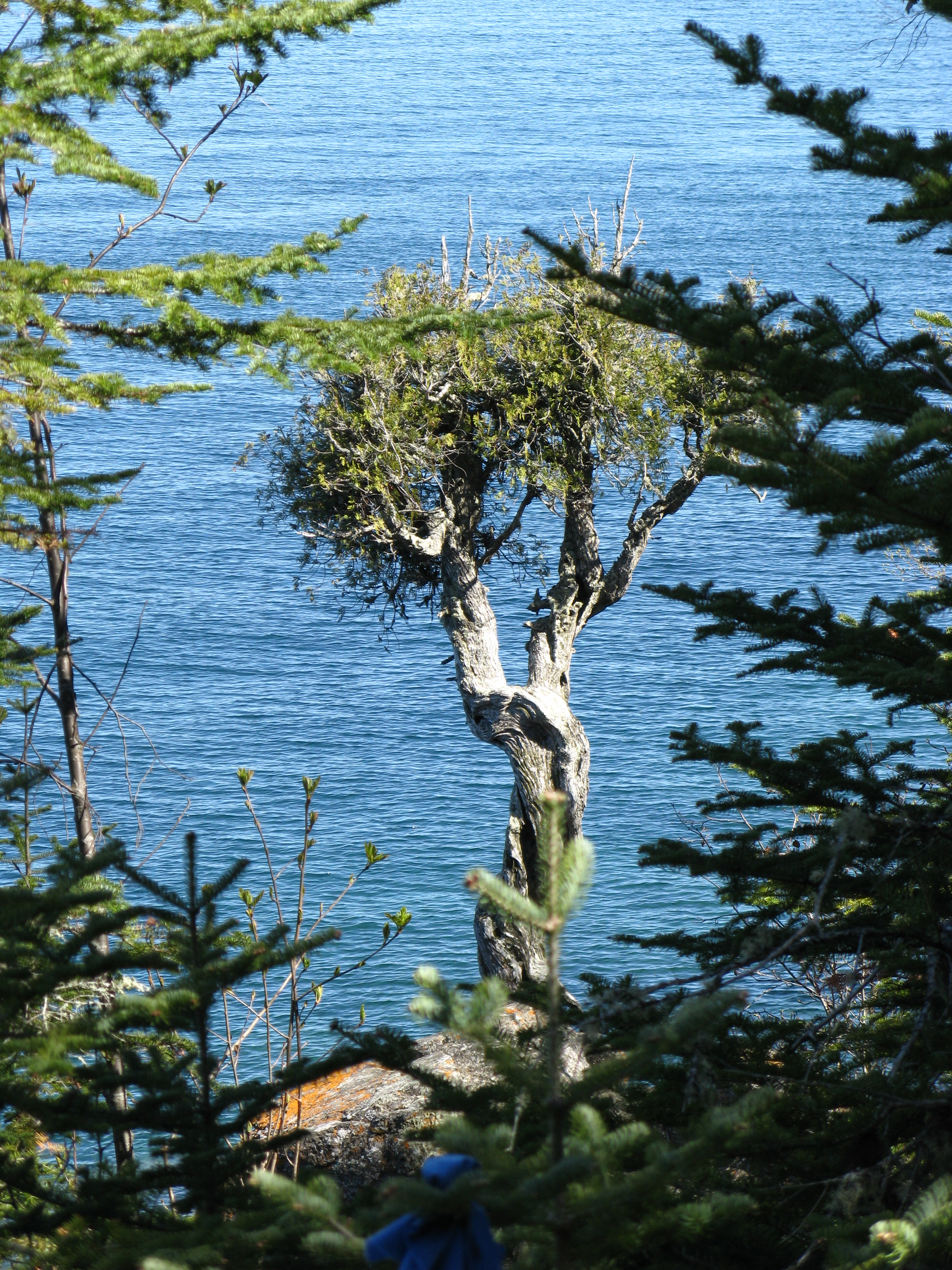
- Interactive map of Witch Tree
- Location: Grand Portage, Minnesota, USA
- Nearest city: Grand Marais, MN
- Coordinates: 47°57′30″N 89°38′30″W
- Governing body: Grand Portage Reservation Tribal Council

The Witch Tree as it is commonly known, also called Manidoo-giizhikens, or Little Cedar Spirit Tree by the Ojibwe First Nation tribe is an ancient Thuja occidentalis (Eastern White Cedar) growing on the shore of Lake Superior in Cook County, Minnesota. The earliest written records of the tree by Europeans in the Americas are by French explorer Sieur de la Verendrye in 1731, who commented on the tree as a mature tree at that time, making it over 300 years old. The tree is held sacred by the Ojibwe, who traditionally leave offerings of tobacco to ensure a safe journey on Lake Superior. Due to its sacred nature and vandalism problems in the past, the tree is considered off limits to visitors unless accompanied by a local Ojibwe band member.

The tree is small for a mature conifer, as it is growing out of bare rock on the shoreline. Its gnarled, stunted, and twisting branches have been the subject of many photographs.

== See also ==
- List of individual trees
- Grand Portage National Monument
