= Baptism River =

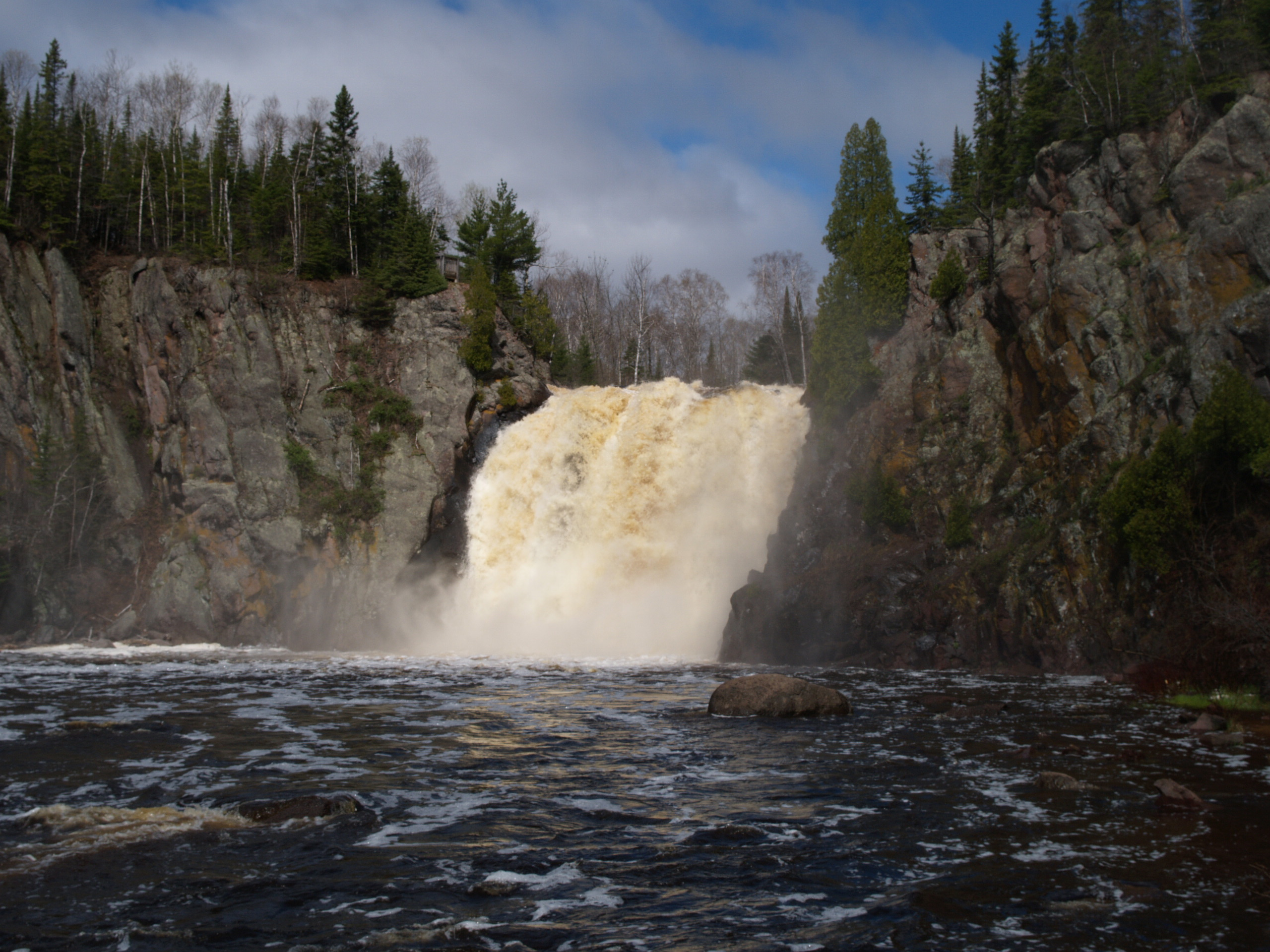
- High Falls on the Baptism River, Tettegouche State Park

- Mouth of the Baptism River

Location
- Country: United States
- State: Minnesota
- County: Lake County

Physical characteristics
- Source
  - location: Finland, Minnesota
  - coordinates: 47°24′48″N 91°14′38″W
  - elevation: 1,290 feet (390 m)
- Mouth
  - location: Lake Superior
  - coordinates: 47°20′10″N 91°11′52″W
  - elevation: 600 feet (180 m)
- Length: 8.8 miles (14.2 km)
- Basin size: 53,900 acres (218 km^{2})

Basin features
- Tributaries
  - left: East Branch Baptism River, Sawmill Creek, Leskinen Creek, Finland Creek, Oliver Creek
  - right: West Branch Baptism River, Lindstrom Creek, Crown Creek
- Waterfalls: High Falls, Two Step Falls, Illgen Falls

The Baptism River is an 8.8-mile-long (14.2 km) river of the U.S. state of Minnesota. The river source is the confluence of the East Branch Baptism River and the West Branch Baptism River just south of the community of Finland.

The High Falls of the Baptism River, in Tettegouche State Park, is the highest waterfall entirely within the state of Minnesota at 60 feet (18 m). The High Falls on the Pigeon River is higher, but is on the border with Ontario.

== Habitat ==
The Baptism River is a designated trout stream with populations of brook, brown and rainbow trout, as well as Chinook salmon.

== See also ==
- List of rivers of Minnesota
