= Aneda =

Evergreen tree used as a scurvy remedy

The evergreen aneda (spelled either this way or as annedda by different 16th- to 17th-century sources) was used by Jacques Cartier and his men as a remedy against scurvy in the winter of 1535–1536. It is generally believed to have been Thuja occidentalis, a common tree in Quebec. However, historian Jacques Mathieu has argued at length that aneda was more likely Abies balsamea, given that tree's role as a traditional remedy and given the much higher vitamin C content of its needles. Samuel de Champlain, around 1608, was unable to find the remedy, and some have supposed that the Indians had lost their knowledge of it in the intervening 72 years. However, a more common explanation is that the St. Lawrence Iroquoians whom Cartier met did not speak the same language as the Hurons or Iroquois living in the area at the time of Champlain, and so the term 'annedda' meant nothing to the latter group.
