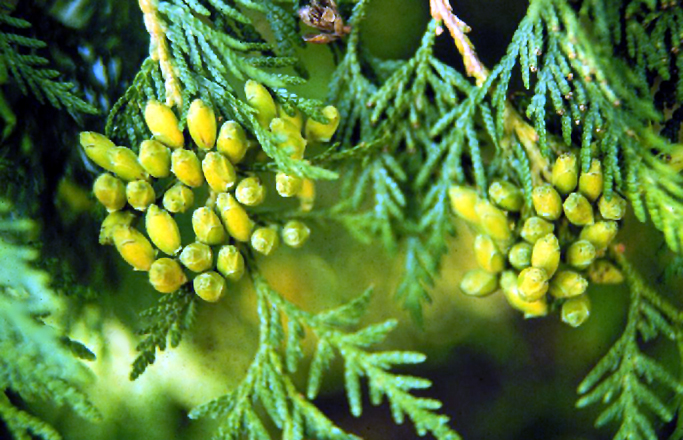
- Leaves and immature cones

Conservation status
- Least Concern (IUCN 3.1)

Scientific classification
- Kingdom: Plantae
- Clade: Tracheophytes
- Clade: Gymnosperms
- Division: Pinophyta
- Class: Pinopsida
- Order: Cupressales
- Family: Cupressaceae
- Genus: Thuja
- Species: T. occidentalis

Binomial name
- Thuja occidentalis L.
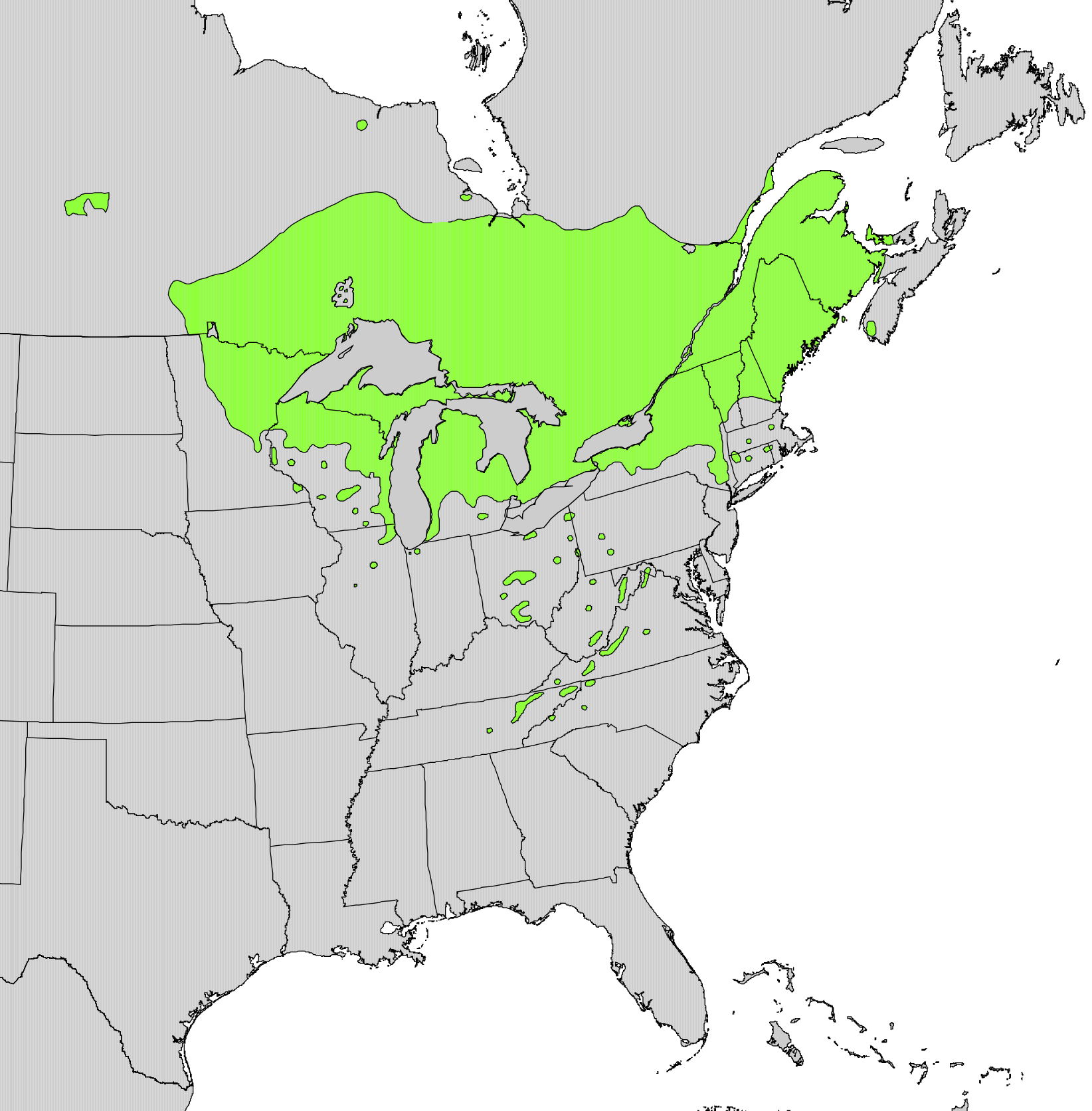
- Natural range

= Thuja occidentalis =

Species of coniferous tree

Thuja occidentalis, also known as northern white-cedar, eastern white-cedar, or eastern arborvitae, is a coniferous tree in the cypress family, Cupressaceae, which is native to eastern Canada and much of the north-central and northeastern United States. It is widely cultivated as an ornamental plant. It is not to be confused with Juniperus virginiana (eastern red cedar).

== Common names ==
Its additional common names include swamp cedar, American arborvitae, and eastern arborvitae. The name arborvitae is particularly used in the horticultural trade in the United States; it is Latin for 'tree of life' due to the supposed medicinal properties of the sap, bark, and twigs. It is sometimes called white-cedar (hyphenated) or whitecedar (one word) to distinguish it from Cedrus, the true cedars.

== Description ==
Unlike the closely related western red cedar (Thuja plicata), northern white cedar is only a small or medium-sized tree, growing to a height of 15 m (49 ft) tall with a 0.9 m (3.0 ft) trunk diameter, exceptionally to 38 metres (125 ft) tall and 1.8 metres (5.9 ft) diameter. The tree is often stunted or prostrate in less favorable locations. The bark is red-brown, furrowed and peels in narrow, longitudinal strips. Northern white cedar has fan-like branches and scaly leaves. The foliage forms in flat sprays with scale-like leaves 3–5 millimetres (1/8–3/16 in) long.

The seed cones are slender, yellow-green, ripening to brown, 9–14 millimetres (3/8–9/16 in) long and 4–5 millimetres (5/32–3/16 in) broad, with six to eight overlapping scales. They contain about eight seeds each. The branches may take root if the tree falls.

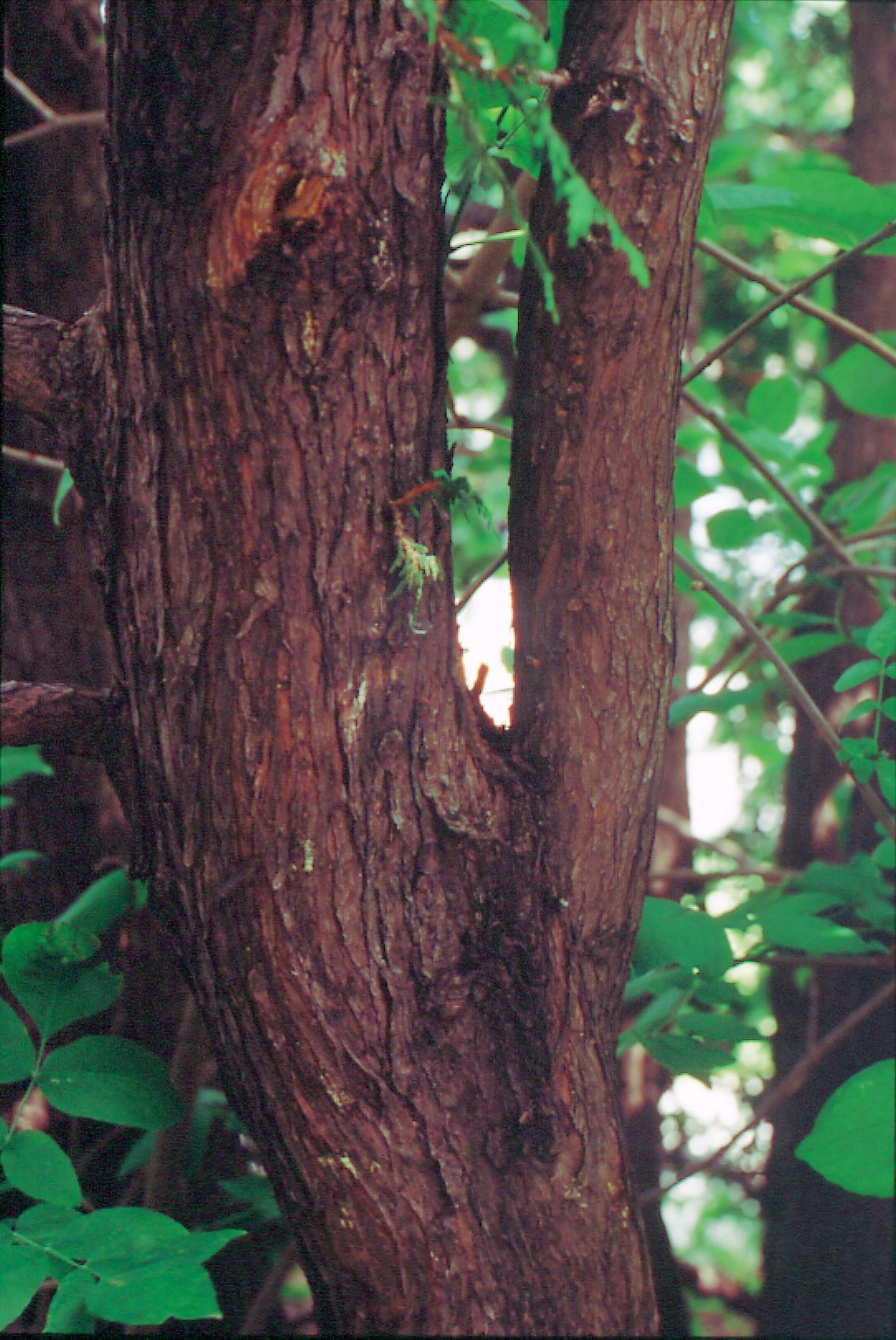
Trunk

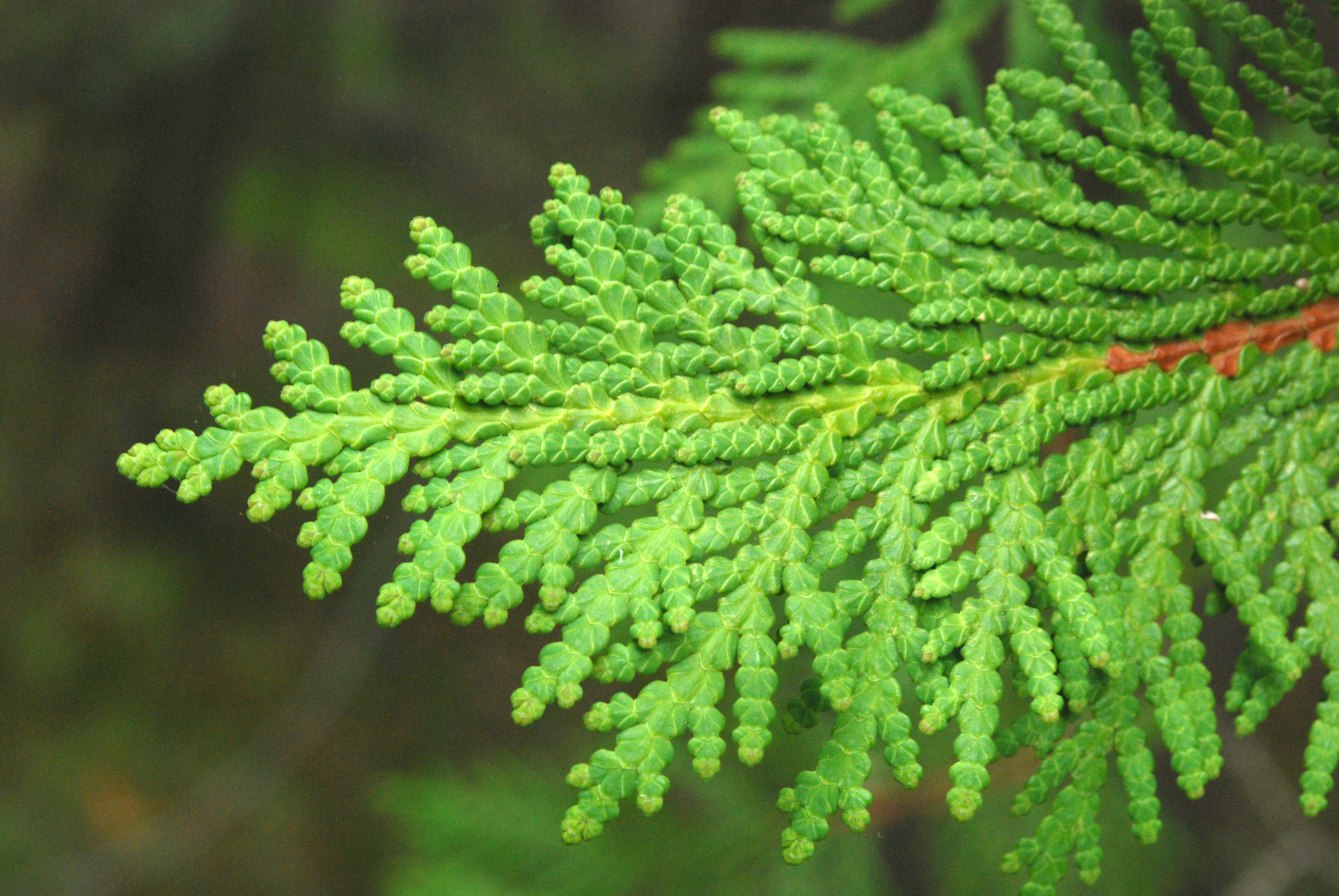
Foliage

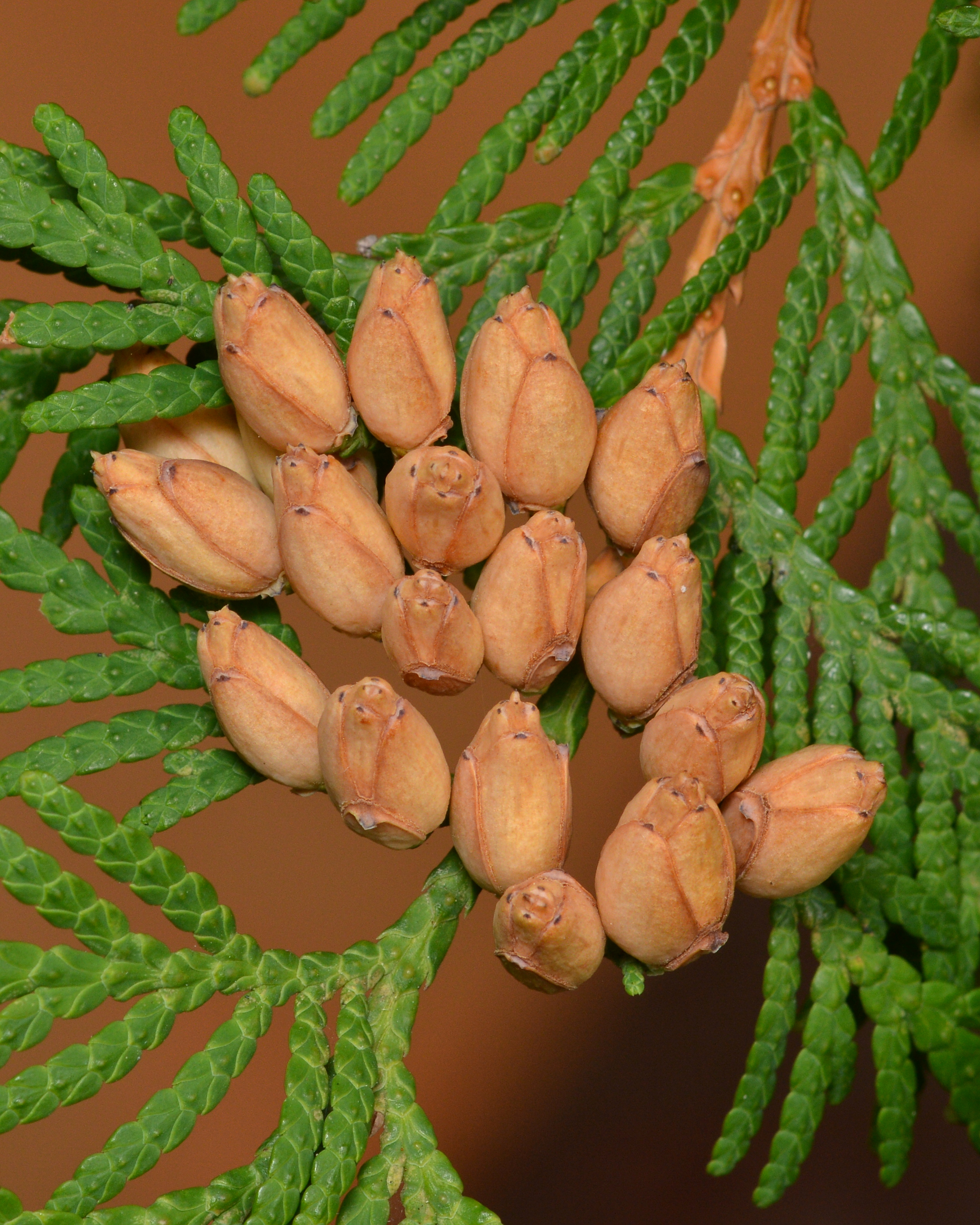
Cones

== Taxonomy ==
The species was first described by Carl Linnaeus in 1753. Over 30 synonyms are listed in Kew's Plants of the World Online database.

== Distribution ==
Northern white cedar is native to an area in the southern part of eastern Canada and the adjacent part of the northern United States. It extends from southeastern Manitoba east throughout the Great Lakes region and into Ontario, Québec, New York, Vermont, New Hampshire, Maine, Prince Edward Island, New Brunswick, and Nova Scotia. Isolated populations occur in west-central Manitoba, and to the south in Massachusetts, Connecticut, Ohio, and Illinois and in the Appalachian Mountains of Kentucky, Tennessee, North Carolina, Pennsylvania, Maryland, Virginia, and West Virginia. In Canada, its range reaches the Arctic treeline and the southern tip of Hudson Bay. It grows mainly in places with cooler summers, with a typical temperature of 16 to 22 °C (61 to 72 °F) in July, and a shorter growing season, from 90 to 180 days.

== Ecology ==
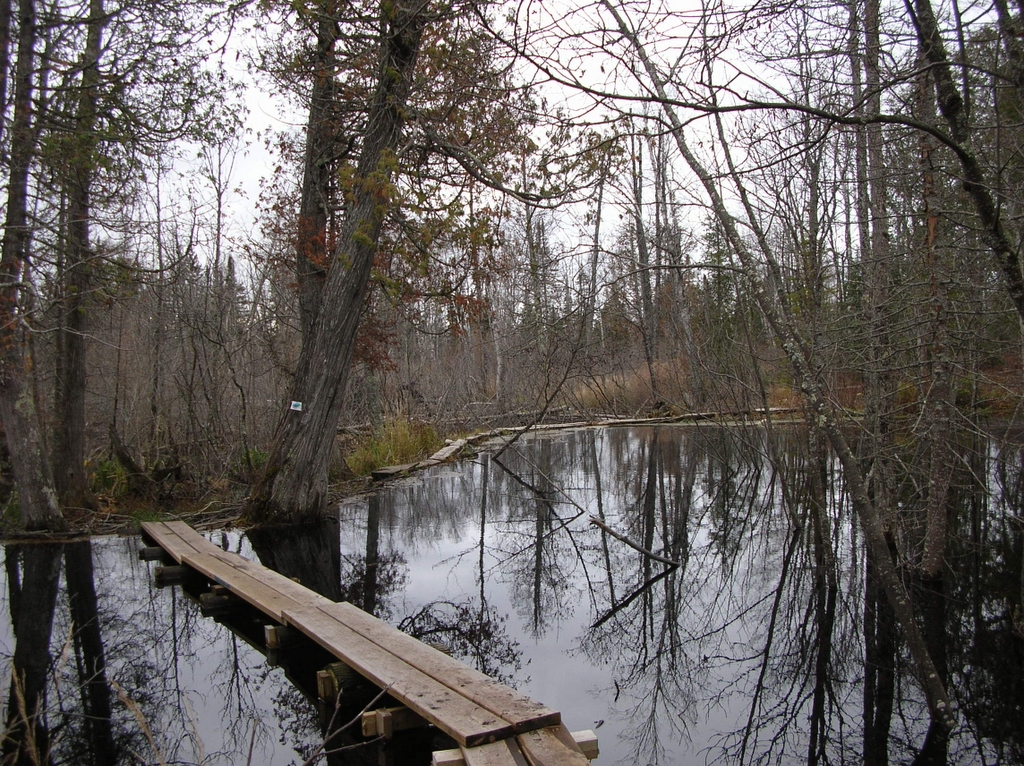
A swamp along the Superior Hiking Trail in November with a smattering of evergreen white cedars (left) and other trees and shrubs

Northern white cedar grows naturally in wet forests, being particularly abundant in coniferous swamps, where other larger and faster-growing trees cannot compete successfully. It also occurs on other sites with reduced tree competition, such as cliffs. Although not currently listed as endangered, wild white cedar populations are threatened in many areas by high deer numbers; deer find the soft evergreen foliage a very attractive winter food and strip it rapidly. The largest known specimen is 34 m (112 ft) tall and 175 cm (69 in) diameter, on South Manitou Island within Leelanau County, Michigan. Northern white cedars can be very long-lived trees in certain conditions, with notably old specimens growing on cliffs where they are inaccessible to deer and wildfire. As of 2008, the oldest known living specimen was 1,141 years old, but a dead specimen with 1,653 growth rings has been found. Despite their age, these very old trees are small and stunted due to the difficult growing conditions. These individuals' long lifespans have been attributed to their slow growth and their ability to survive when different sections of the tree are damaged or killed. The Witch Tree, a T. occidentalis growing out of a cliff face on Lake Superior in Minnesota, was described by the French explorer Sieur de la Verendrye as being a mature tree in 1731; it is still alive today.

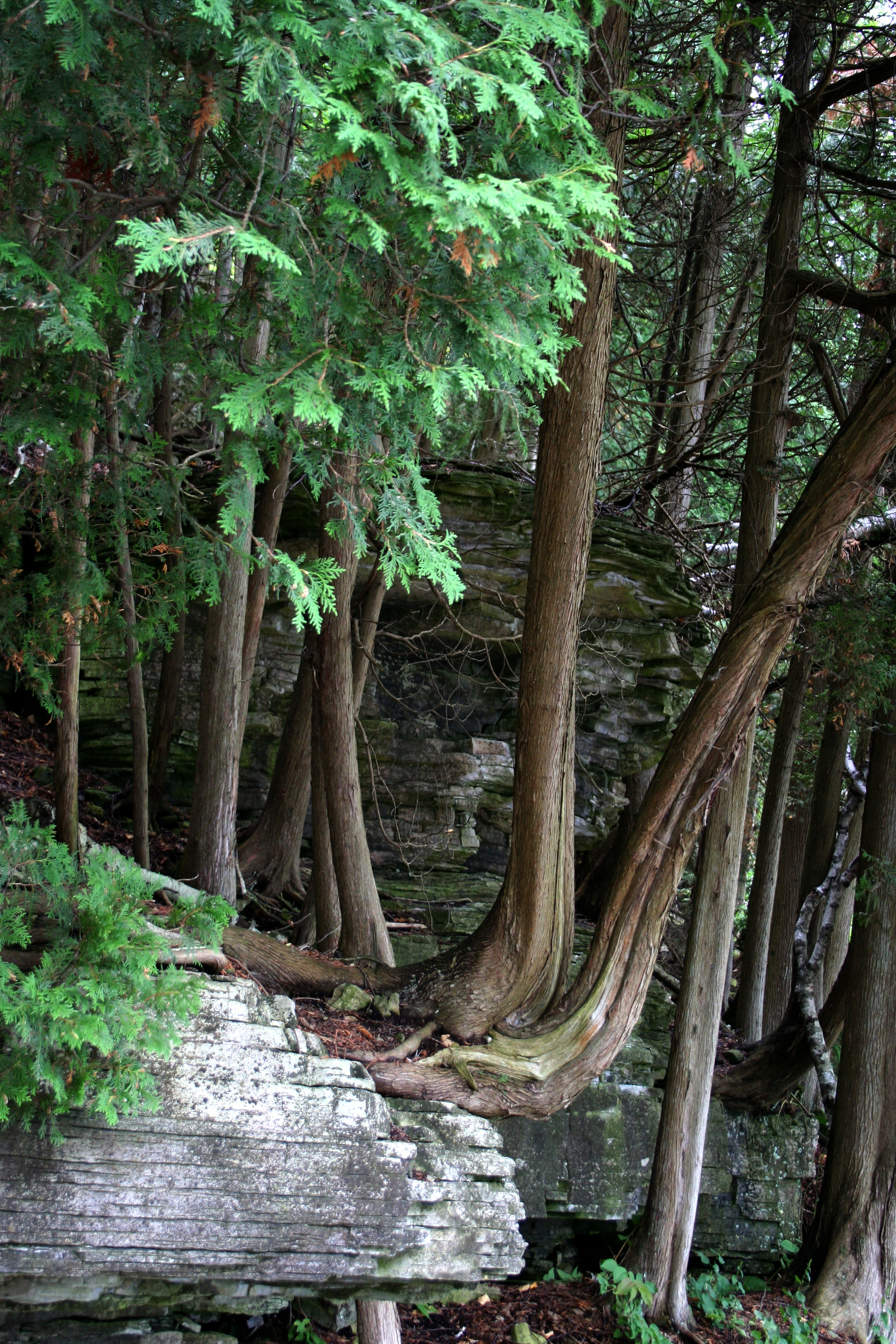
Old trees growing on a rock ledge in Potawatomi State Park, Wisconsin

Specimens found growing on cliff faces in southern Ontario are the oldest trees in Eastern North America and all of Canada, having achieved ages in excess of 1,653 years.

Wild type eastern white cedar is rare in Nova Scotia, which is situated in the eastern limit of the tree's natural range. Only 34 natural stands of the tree are known from the province. Due to its rarity, eastern white cedar is listed as vulnerable under the Nova Scotia Endangered Species Act.

== Uses ==
Thuja occidentalis is commercially used for rustic fencing and posts, lumber, poles, shingles, and in the construction of log cabins. It is the preferred wood for the structural elements, such as ribs and planking, of birchbark canoes and the planking of wooden canoes.

The essential oil within the plant has been used for cleansers, disinfectants, hair preparations, insecticides, liniment, room sprays, and soft soaps. The Ojibwa reportedly made a soup from the inner bark of the soft twigs. Others have used the twigs to make teas to relieve constipation and headache.

Eastern white cedar – as arborvitae – is a popular ornamental plant used in both residential and commercial landscapes.

Thuja occidentalis has important uses in traditional Ojibwe culture. Honoured with the name Nookomis Giizhik (Grandmother Cedar), the tree is the subject of sacred legends and is considered a gift to humanity for its myriad of uses, among them crafts, construction, and medicine. It is one of the four plants of the Ojibwe medicine wheel, associated with the north. The foliage is rich in vitamin C and is believed to be the annedda, which cured the scurvy of Jacques Cartier and his party in the winter of 1535–1536. Due to the presence of the neurotoxic compound thujone, internal use can be harmful if used for prolonged periods or while pregnant.

== Cultivation ==
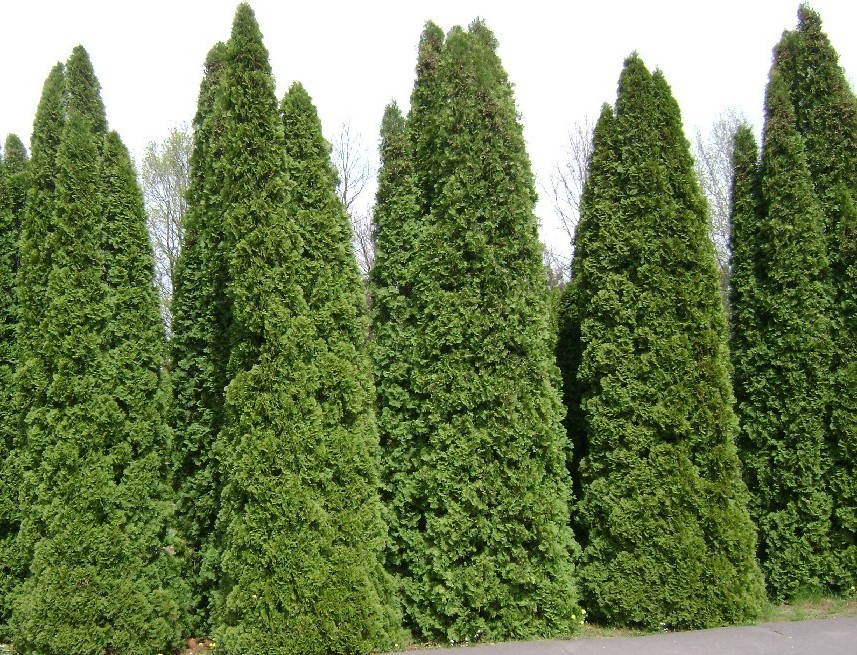
A grove of a columnar ornamental variety in Powsin Botanical Garden, Warsaw, Poland

T. occidentalis is widely used as an ornamental tree, particularly for screens and hedges, in gardens, parks, and cemeteries. Over 300 cultivars exist, showing great variation in colour, shape, and size, with some of the more common ones being 'Degroot's Spire', 'Ellwangeriana', 'Hetz Wintergreen', 'Lutea', 'Rheingold', 'Smaragd' (or 'Emerald Green'), 'Techny', and 'Wareana'. It was introduced into Europe as early as 1540.

These cultivars have gained the Royal Horticultural Society's Award of Garden Merit:

- 'Danica'
- 'Golden Tuffet'
- 'Holmstrup'
- 'Rheingold'
- 'Smaragd'

== See also ==
- Chamaecyparis thyoides
