= History of Canada =

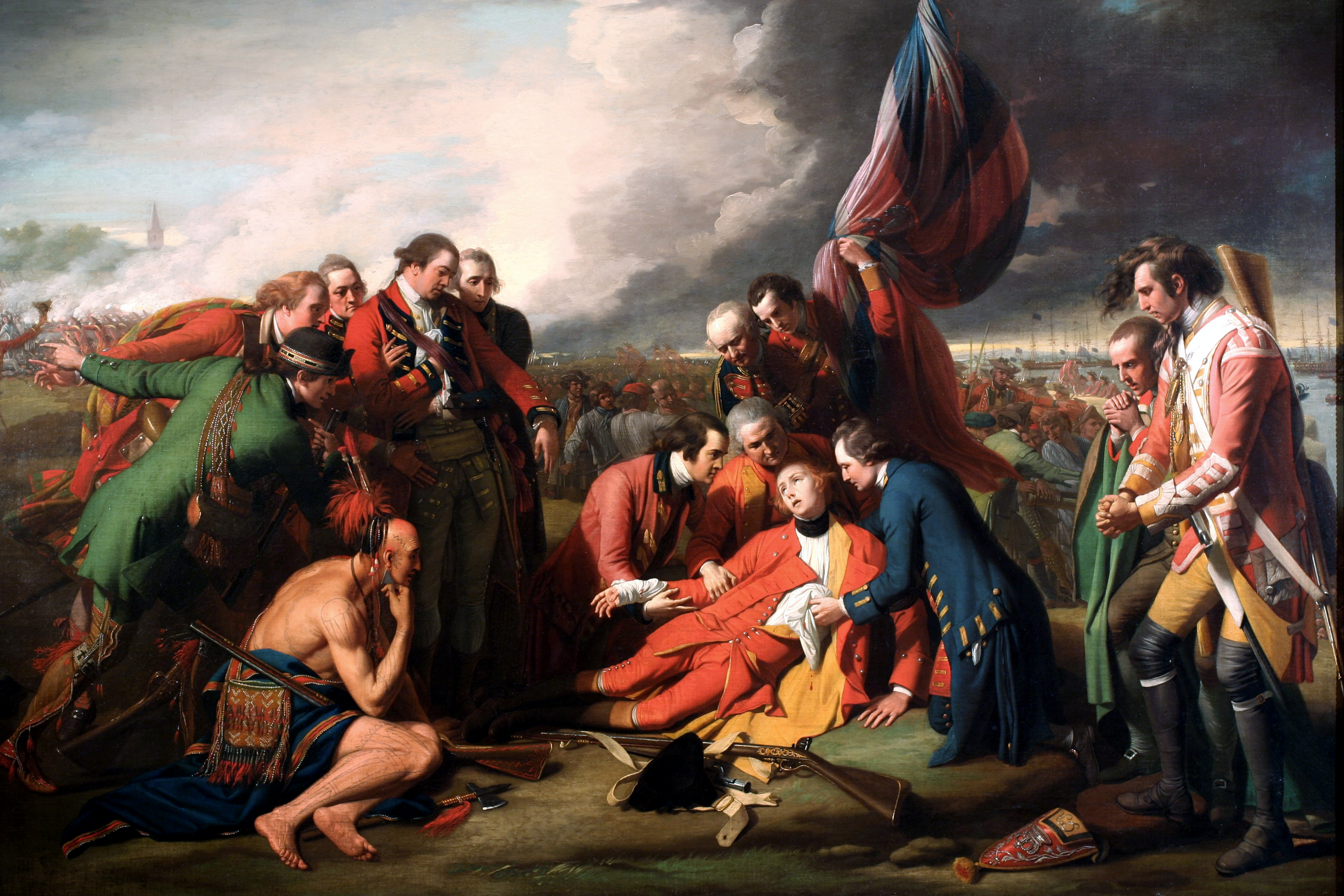
The Battle of the Plains of Abraham was a pivotal battle during the French and Indian War over the fate of New France, influencing the later creation of Canada. The painting shows the death of General James Wolfe in 1759.

The history of Canada covers the period from the arrival of the Paleo-Indians to North America thousands of years ago to the present day. The lands encompassing present-day Canada have been inhabited for millennia by Indigenous peoples, with distinct trade networks, spiritual beliefs, and styles of social organization. Some of these older civilizations had long faded by the time of the first European arrivals and have been discovered through archaeological investigations.

From the late 15th century, French and British expeditions explored, colonized, and fought over various places within North America in what constitutes present-day Canada. The colony of New France was claimed in 1534 by Jacques Cartier, with permanent settlements beginning in 1608. France ceded nearly all its North American possessions to Great Britain in 1763 at the Treaty of Paris after the Seven Years' War. The now British Province of Quebec was divided into Upper and Lower Canada in 1791. The two provinces were united as the Province of Canada by the Act of Union 1840, which came into force in 1841. In 1867, the Province of Canada was joined with two other British colonies of New Brunswick and Nova Scotia through Confederation, forming a self-governing entity. "Canada" was adopted as the legal name of the new country and the word "Dominion" was conferred as the country's title. Over the next eighty-two years, Canada expanded by incorporating other parts of British North America, finishing with Newfoundland and Labrador in 1949.

Although responsible government had existed in British North America since 1848, Britain continued to set its foreign and defence policies until the end of World War I. The Balfour Declaration of 1926, the 1930 Imperial Conference and the passing of the Statute of Westminster in 1931 recognized that Canada had become co-equal with the United Kingdom. The Patriation of the Constitution in 1982 marked the removal of legal dependence on the British parliament. Canada currently consists of ten provinces and three territories and is a parliamentary democracy and a constitutional monarchy.

Over centuries, elements of Indigenous, French, British and more recent immigrant customs have combined to form a Canadian culture that has also been strongly influenced by its linguistic, geographic and economic neighbour, the United States. Since the conclusion of the Second World War, Canada's strong support for multilateralism and internationalism has been closely related to its peacekeeping efforts.

== Indigenous peoples ==
=== Indigenous societies ===
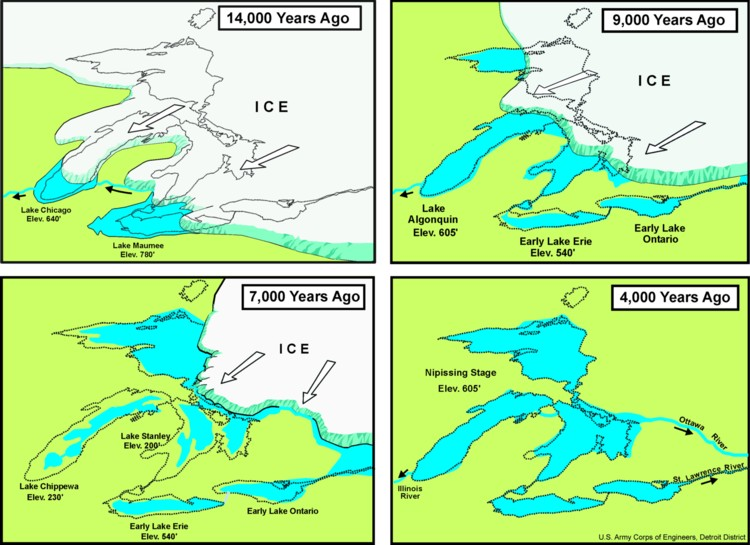
The Great Lakes are estimated to have been formed at the end of the last glacial period (about 10,000 years ago), when the Laurentide ice sheet receded.

Archaeological and Indigenous genetic evidence indicates that North and South America were the last continents into which humans migrated. During the Wisconsin glaciation, which began 100,000–75,000 years ago and ended about 11,000 years ago, falling sea levels allowed people to move gradually across the Bering land bridge (Beringia), from Siberia into northwest North America. At that point, they were blocked by the Laurentide ice sheet, then covering most of Canada, confining them to Alaska and the Yukon for thousands of years. The exact dates and routes of the peopling of the Americas are the subject of an ongoing debate.

About 16,000 years ago, the glacial melt allowed people to move by land south and east out of Beringia, and into Canada. The Haida Gwaii islands, Old Crow Flats, and the Bluefish Caves contain some of the earliest Paleo-Indian archeological sites in Canada. Ice Age hunter-gatherers of this period left lithic flake fluted stone tools and the remains of large butchered mammals.

The North American climate stabilized around 8000 BC (10,000 years ago). Climatic conditions were similar to modern patterns; however, the receding glacial ice sheets still covered large portions of the land, creating lakes of meltwater. Most population groups during the Archaic periods were still highly mobile hunter-gatherers. However, individual groups started to focus on resources available to them locally; thus with the passage of time, there is a pattern of increasing regional generalization (i.e.: Paleo-Arctic, Plano and Maritime Archaic traditions).

The Woodland cultural period dates from about 2000 BC to 1000 AD and is applied to the Ontario, Quebec, and Maritime regions. The introduction of pottery distinguishes the Woodland culture from the previous Archaic-stage inhabitants. The Laurentian-related people of Ontario manufactured the oldest pottery excavated to date in Canada.

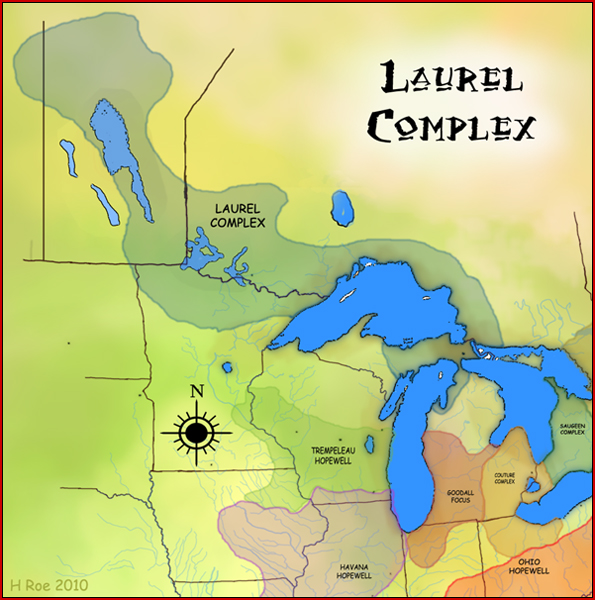
Laurel complex in present day northern Ontario and Manitoba

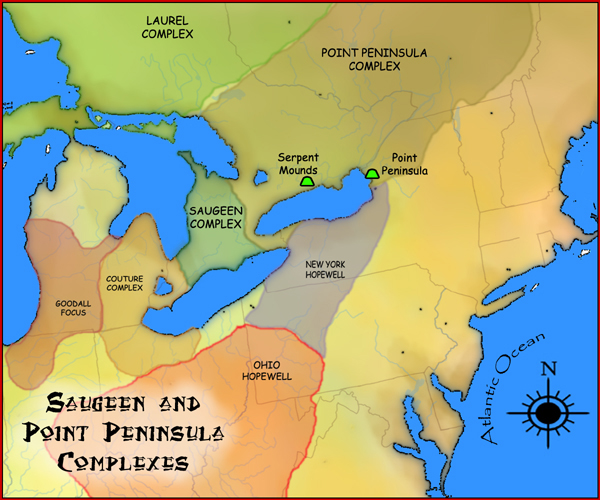
Complexes in present day southern Ontario and southwestern Quebec

Local cultural expressions of the Hopewell tradition during the Middle Woodland period

The Hopewell tradition is an Indigenous culture that flourished along American rivers from 300 BC to 500 AD. At its greatest extent, the Hopewell Exchange System connected cultures and societies to the peoples on the Canadian shores of Lake Ontario. Canadian expression of the Hopewellian peoples encompasses the Point Peninsula, Saugeen, and Laurel complexes.

The eastern woodland areas of what became Canada were home to the Algonquian and Iroquoian peoples. The Algonquian language is believed to have originated in the western plateau of Idaho or the plains of Montana and moved with migrants eastward, eventually extending in various manifestations all the way from Hudson Bay to what is today Nova Scotia in the east and as far south as the Tidewater region of Virginia.

Speakers of eastern Algonquian languages included the Mi'kmaq and Abenaki of the Maritime region of Canada and likely the extinct Beothuk of Newfoundland. The Ojibwa and other Anishinaabe speakers of the central Algonquian languages retain an oral tradition of having moved to their lands around the western and central Great Lakes from the sea, likely the Atlantic coast. According to oral tradition, the Ojibwe formed the Council of Three Fires in 796 AD with the Odawa and the Potawatomi.

The Five Nations of the Iroquois (Haudenosaunee) were centred from at least 1000 AD in northern New York, but their influence extended into what is now southern Ontario and the Montreal area of modern Quebec. They spoke varieties of Iroquoian languages. The Iroquois Confederacy, according to oral tradition, was formed in 1142 AD. In addition, there were other Iroquoian-speaking peoples in the area, including the St. Lawrence Iroquoians, the Erie, and others.

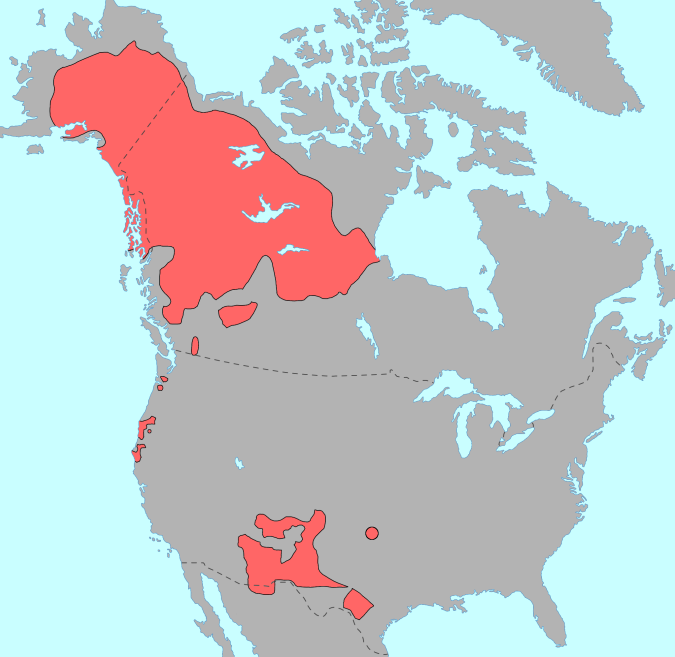
Pre-Columbian distribution of Na-Dene languages in North America.

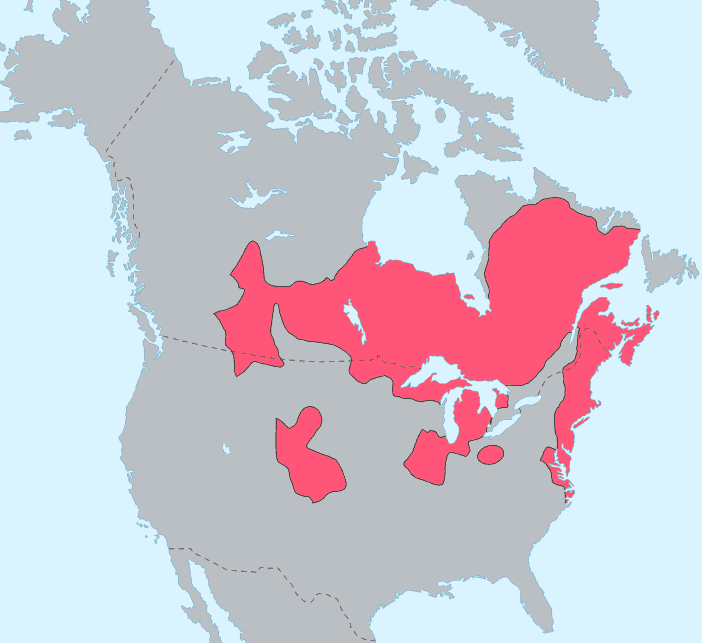
Pre-Columbian distribution of Algonquian languages in North America.

On the Great Plains, the Cree or Nēhilawē (who spoke a closely related Central Algonquian language, the plains Cree language) depended on the vast herds of bison to supply food and many of their other needs. To the northwest were the peoples of the Na-Dene languages, which include the Athapaskan-speaking peoples and the Tlingit, who lived on the islands of southern Alaska and northern British Columbia. The Na-Dene language group is believed to be linked to the Yeniseian languages of Siberia. The Dene of the western Arctic may represent a distinct wave of migration from Asia to North America.

The Interior of British Columbia was home to the Salishan language groups such as the Shuswap (Secwepemc), Okanagan and southern Athabaskan language groups, primarily the Dakelh (Carrier) and the Tsilhqot'in. The inlets and valleys of the British Columbia Coast sheltered large, distinctive populations, such as the Haida, Kwakwaka'wakw and Nuu-chah-nulth, sustained by the region's abundant salmon and shellfish. These peoples developed complex cultures dependent on the western red cedar that included wooden houses, both seagoing whaling and war canoes, elaborately carved potlatch items, and totem poles.

In the Arctic Archipelago, the distinctive Paleo-Eskimos known as Dorset peoples, whose culture has been traced back to around 500 BC, were replaced by the ancestors of today's Inuit by 1500 AD. This transition is supported by archeological records and Inuit mythology that tells of having driven off the Tuniit or 'first inhabitants'. Inuit traditional laws are anthropologically different from Western law. Customary law was non-existent in Inuit society before the introduction of the Canadian legal system.

=== European contact ===
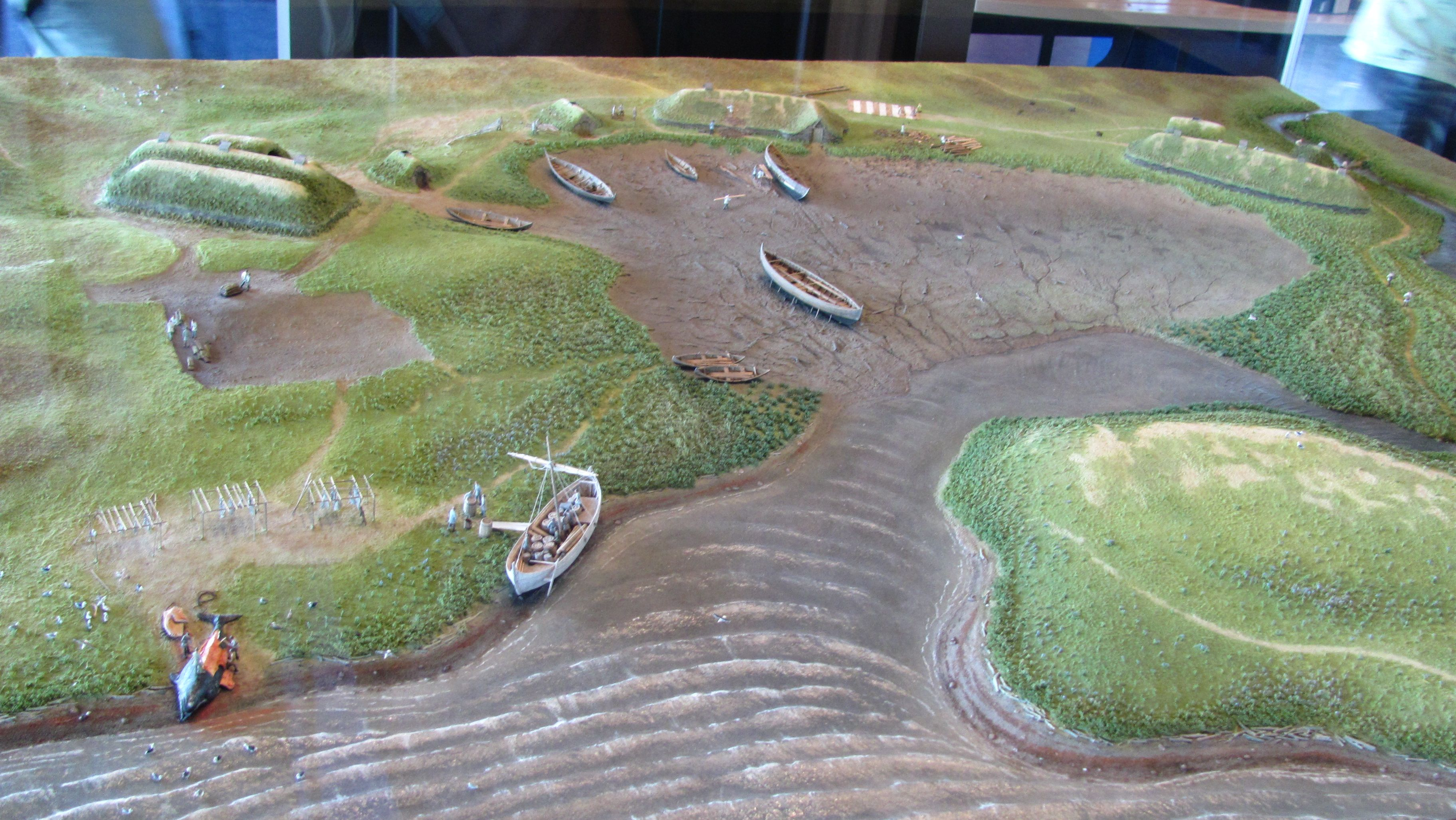
A model of the Norse settlement at L'Anse aux Meadows on the island of Newfoundland. The Norse settlement dates to c. 1000 AD.

The Norse, who had settled Greenland and Iceland, arrived around 1000 AD and built a small settlement at L'Anse aux Meadows at the northernmost tip of Newfoundland (carbon dating estimate 990 – 1050 AD). L'Anse aux Meadows, the only confirmed Norse site in North America outside of Greenland, is also notable for its connection with the attempted settlement of Vinland by Leif Erikson around the same period or, more broadly, with Norse exploration of the Americas.

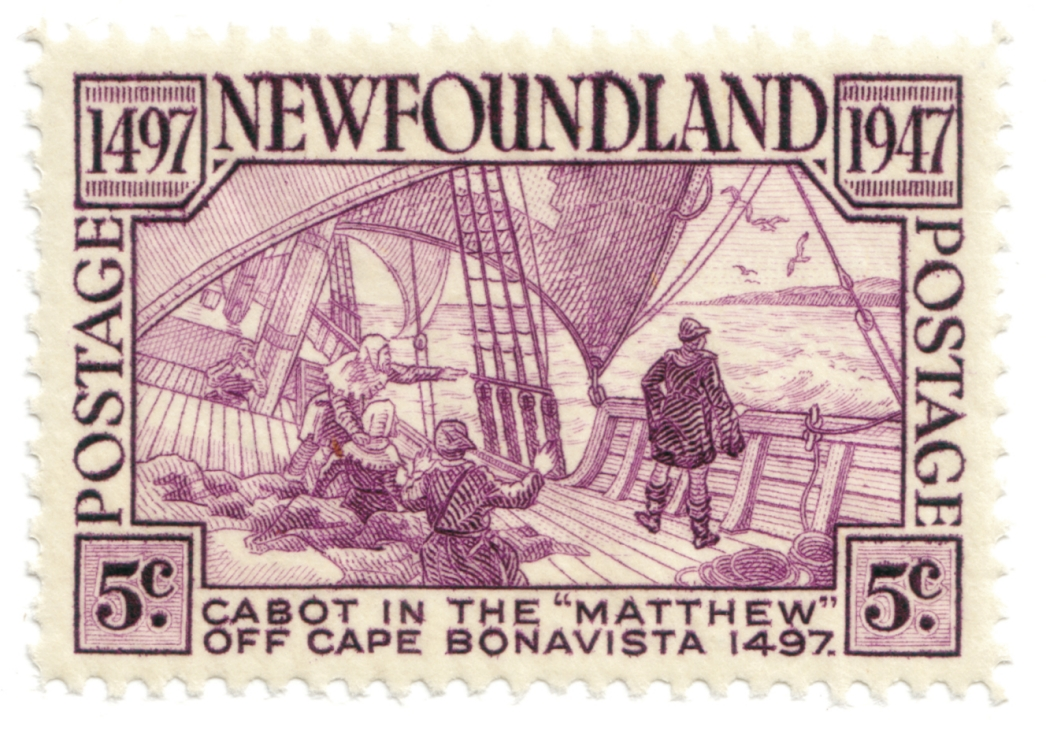
A commemorative stamp from 1947, depicting John Cabot aboard the Matthew off Cape Bonavista during his 1497 voyage

Under letters patent from King Henry VII of England, the Italian John Cabot became the first European known to have landed in Canada after the Viking Age. Records indicate that on June 24, 1497, he sighted land at a northern location believed to be somewhere in the Atlantic provinces. Official tradition deemed the first landing site to be at Cape Bonavista, Newfoundland, although other locations are possible. After 1497 Cabot and his son Sebastian Cabot continued to make other voyages to find the Northwest Passage, and other explorers continued to sail out of England to the New World, although the details of these voyages are not well recorded.

Based on the Treaty of Tordesillas, the Spanish Crown claimed it had territorial rights in the area visited by John Cabot in 1497 and 1498 AD. However, Portuguese explorers like João Fernandes Lavrador would continue to visit the north Atlantic coast, which accounts for the appearance of "Labrador" on maps of the period. In 1501 and 1502 the Corte-Real brothers explored Newfoundland (Terra Nova) and Labrador claiming these lands as part of the Portuguese Empire. In 1506, King Manuel I of Portugal created taxes for the cod fisheries in Newfoundland waters. João Álvares Fagundes and Pero de Barcelos established fishing outposts in Newfoundland and Nova Scotia around 1521 AD; however, these were later abandoned, with the Portuguese colonizers focusing their efforts on South America. The extent and nature of Portuguese activity on the Canadian mainland during the 16th century remains unclear and controversial.

== Canada under French rule ==
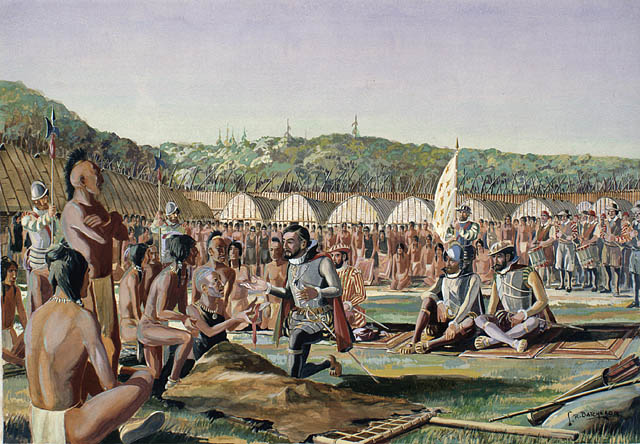
Jacques Cartier meeting with the St. Lawrence Iroquois at Hochelaga during his second voyage in 1535

French interest in the New World began with Francis I of France, who in 1524 sponsored Giovanni da Verrazzano's navigation of the region between Florida and Newfoundland in hopes of finding a route to the Pacific Ocean. Although the English had laid claims to it in 1497 when John Cabot made landfall somewhere on the North American coast (likely either modern-day Newfoundland or Nova Scotia) and had claimed the land for England on behalf of King Henry VII, these claims were not exercised and England did not attempt to create a permanent colony.

Jacques Cartier planted a cross in the Gaspé Peninsula in 1534 and claimed the land in the name of Francis I of France, and the following summer the region called "Canada" was created. Cartier had sailed up the St. Lawrence river as far as the Lachine Rapids, to the spot where Montreal now stands. Permanent settlement attempts by Cartier at Charlesbourg-Royal in 1541, at Sable Island in 1598 by Marquis de La Roche-Mesgouez, and at Tadoussac, Quebec in 1600 by François Gravé Du Pont all eventually failed. Despite these initial failures, French fishing fleets visited the Atlantic coast communities and sailed into the St. Lawrence River, trading and making alliances with First Nations, as well as establishing fishing settlements such as in Percé (1603). As a result of France's claim and activities in the colony of Canada, the name Canada was found on international maps showing the existence of this colony within the St. Lawrence river region.

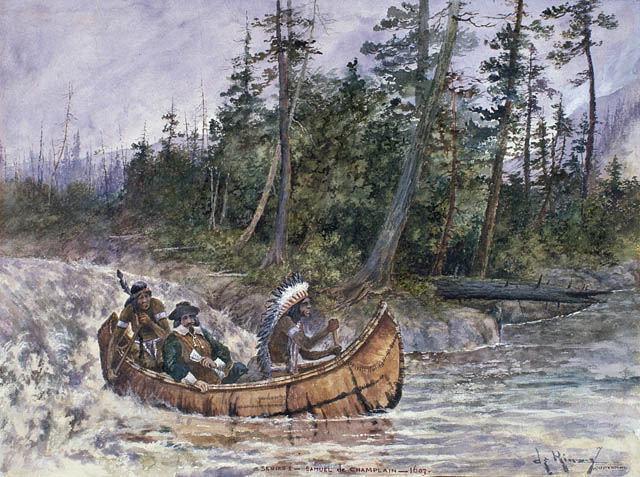
Samuel de Champlain with two Innu guides in 1603

In 1604, a North American fur trade monopoly was granted to Pierre Du Gua, Sieur de Mons. The fur trade became one of the main economic ventures in North America. Du Gua led his first colonization expedition to an island located near the mouth of the St. Croix River. Among his lieutenants was a geographer named Samuel de Champlain, who promptly carried out a major exploration of the northeastern coastline of what is now the United States. In the spring of 1605, under Samuel de Champlain, the new St. Croix settlement was moved to Port Royal (today's Annapolis Royal, Nova Scotia). Samuel de Champlain also landed at Saint John Harbour on June 24, 1604 (the feast of St. John the Baptist) and is where the city of Saint John, New Brunswick, and the Saint John River gets their name.

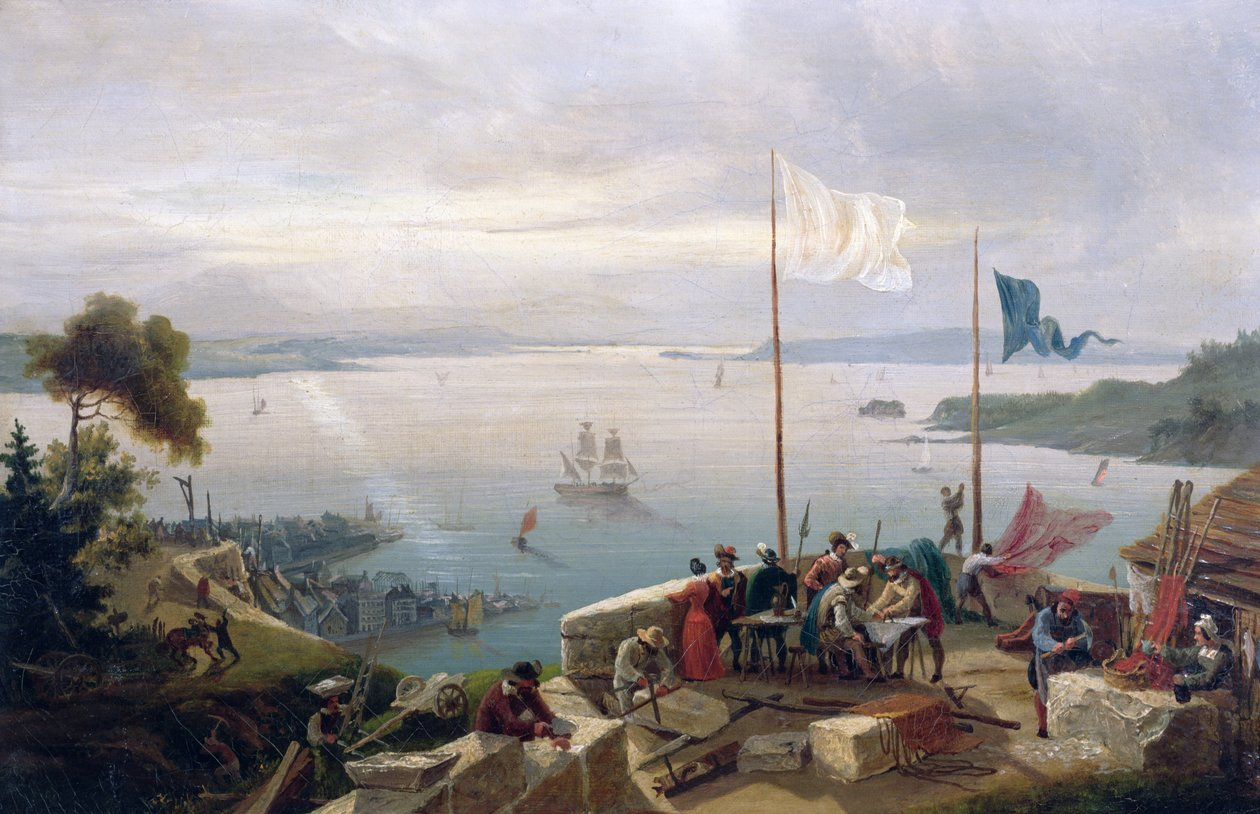
The establishment of Quebec City in 1608, with Samuel de Champlain and his party depicted in the bottom foreground.

In 1608 Champlain founded what is now Quebec City, one of the earliest permanent settlements, which would become the capital of New France. He took personal administration over the city and its affairs and sent out expeditions to explore the interior. Champlain became the first known European to encounter Lake Champlain in 1609. By 1615, he had travelled by canoe up the Ottawa River through Lake Nipissing and Georgian Bay to the centre of Huron country near Lake Simcoe. During these voyages, Champlain aided the Wendat people (aka "Hurons") in their battles against the Iroquois Confederacy. As a result, the Iroquois would become enemies of the French and be involved in multiple conflicts (known as the French and Iroquois Wars) until the signing of the Great Peace of Montreal in 1701.

The English, led by Humphrey Gilbert, had claimed St. John's, Newfoundland, in 1583 as the first North American English colony by royal prerogative of Queen Elizabeth I. In the reign of King James I, the English established additional colonies in Cupids and Ferryland, Newfoundland, and soon after established the first successful permanent settlements of Virginia to the south. On September 29, 1621, a charter for the foundation of a New World Scottish colony was granted by King James to William Alexander. In 1622, the first settlers left Scotland. They initially failed and permanent Nova Scotian settlements were not firmly established until 1629 during the end of the Anglo-French War. These colonies did not last long except the fisheries in Ferryland under David Kirke. In 1631, under Charles I of England, the Treaty of Suza was signed, ending the war and returning Nova Scotia to the French. New France was not fully restored to French rule until the 1632 Treaty of Saint-Germain-en-Laye. This led to new French immigrants and the founding of Trois-Rivières in 1634.

Map of North America in 1702, showing areas occupied by European settlements. By the 18th century, the British and French had several competing claims in northern America.

After Champlain's death in 1635, the Roman Catholic Church and the Jesuit establishment became the most dominant force in New France and hoped to establish a utopian European and Aboriginal Christian community. In 1642, the Sulpicians sponsored a group of settlers led by Paul Chomedey de Maisonneuve, who founded Ville-Marie, the precursor to present-day Montreal. In 1663 the French crown took direct control of the colonies from the Company of New France.

Although immigration rates to New France remained very low under direct French control, most of the new arrivals were farmers, and the rate of population growth among the settlers themselves had been very high. The women had about 30 per cent more children than comparable women who remained in France. Yves Landry says, "Canadians had an exceptional diet for their time." This was due to the natural abundance of meat, fish, and pure water; the good food conservation conditions during the winter; and an adequate wheat supply in most years. The 1666 census of New France was conducted by France's intendant, Jean Talon, in the winter of 1665–1666. The census showed a population count of 3,215 Acadians and habitants (French-Canadian farmers) in the administrative districts of Acadia and Canada. The census also revealed a great difference in the number of men at 2,034 versus 1,181 women.

=== Wars during the colonial era ===
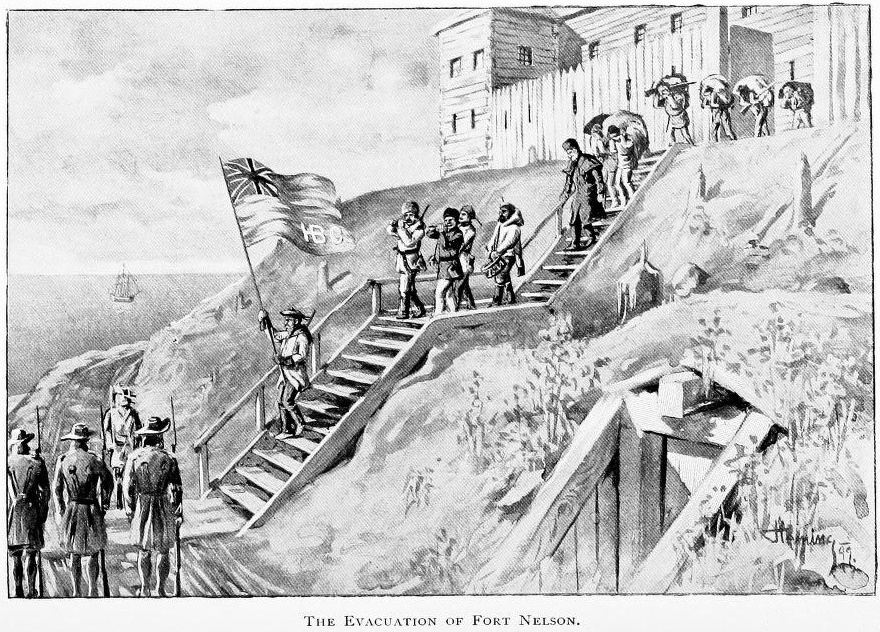
Hudson's Bay Company personnel surrender Fort Nelson to French forces after the Battle of Hudson's Bay

By the early 1700s, the New France settlers were well established along the shores of the St. Lawrence River and parts of Nova Scotia, with a population of around 16,000. However, new arrivals stopped coming from France in the proceeding decades, meaning that the English and Scottish settlers in Newfoundland, Nova Scotia, and the southern Thirteen Colonies outnumbered the French population approximately ten to one by the 1750s.

From 1670, through the Hudson's Bay Company, the English also laid claim to Hudson Bay and its drainage basin, known as Rupert's Land, establishing new trading posts and forts, while continuing to operate fishing settlements in Newfoundland. French expansion along the Canadian canoe routes challenged the Hudson's Bay Company claims, and in 1686, Pierre Troyes led an overland expedition from Montreal to the shore of the bay, where they managed to capture a handful of outposts. La Salle's explorations gave France a claim to the Mississippi River Valley, where fur trappers and a few settlers set up scattered forts and settlements.

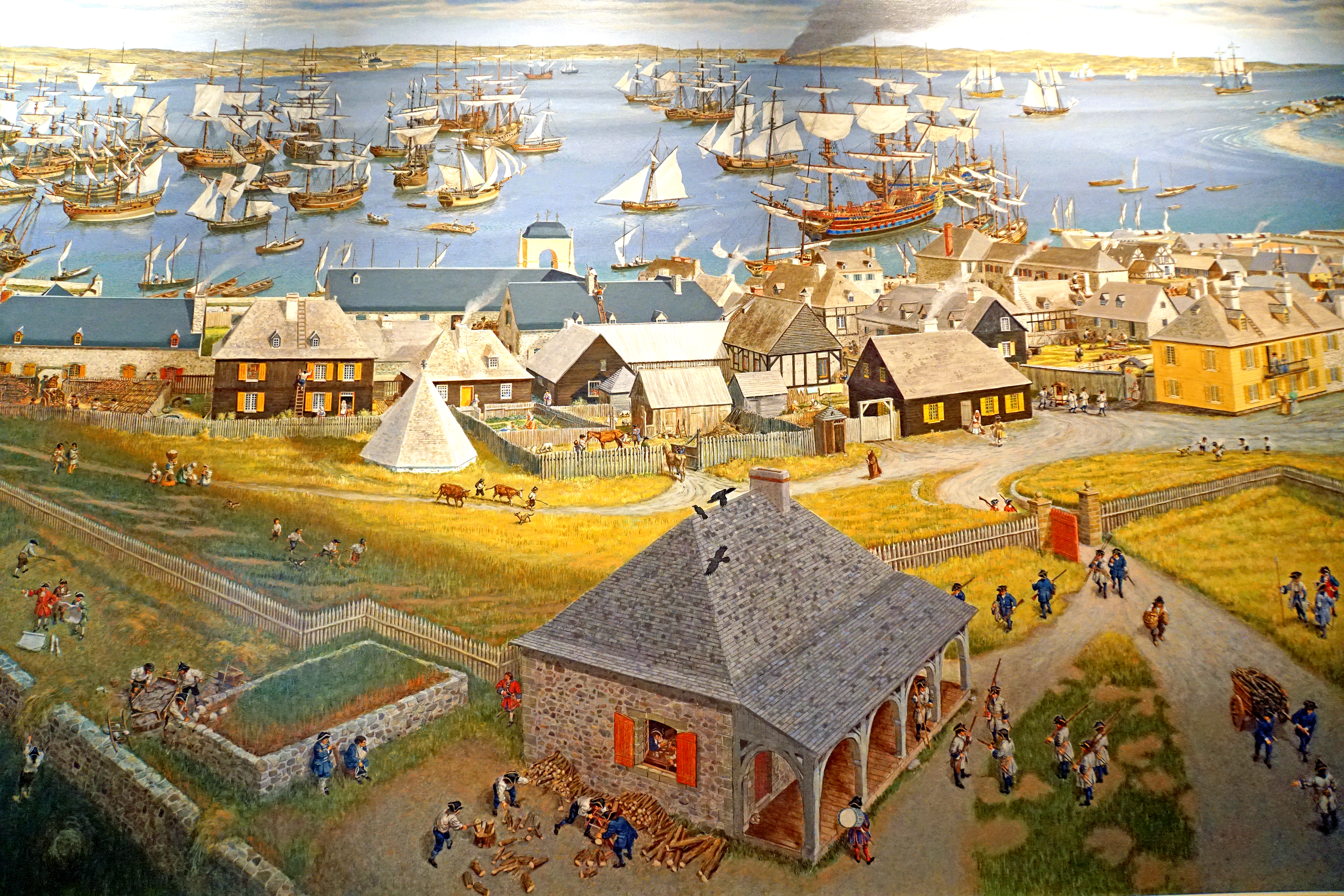
The port inside the Fortress of Louisbourg. The French built the fortress during the mid-18th century to protect the Acadian colony on Île-Royale.

There were four French and Indian Wars and two additional wars in Acadia and Nova Scotia between the Thirteen American Colonies and New France from 1688 to 1763. During King William's War (1688 to 1697), military conflicts in Acadia included the Battle of Port Royal (1690); a naval battle in the Bay of Fundy (Action of July 14, 1696); and the Raid on Chignecto (1696). The Treaty of Ryswick in 1697 ended the war between the two colonial powers of England and France for a brief time. During Queen Anne's War (1702 to 1713), the British Conquest of Acadia occurred in 1710, resulting in Nova Scotia (other than Cape Breton) being officially ceded to the British by the Treaty of Utrecht, including Rupert's Land, which France had conquered in the late 17th century (Battle of Hudson's Bay). As an immediate result of this setback, France founded the powerful Fortress of Louisbourg on Cape Breton Island.

Louisbourg was intended to serve as a year-round military and naval base for France's remaining North American empire and to protect the entrance to the St. Lawrence River. Father Rale's War resulted in both the fall of New France's influence in present-day Maine and the British recognition that it would have to negotiate with the Mi'kmaq in Nova Scotia. During King George's War (1744 to 1748), an army of New Englanders led by William Pepperrell mounted an expedition of 90 vessels and 4,000 men against Louisbourg in 1745. Within three months the fortress surrendered. The return of Louisbourg to French control by the peace treaty prompted the British to found Halifax in 1749 under Edward Cornwallis. Despite the official cessation of war between the British and French empires with the Treaty of Aix-la-Chapelle, the conflict in Acadia and Nova Scotia continued as Father Le Loutre's War.

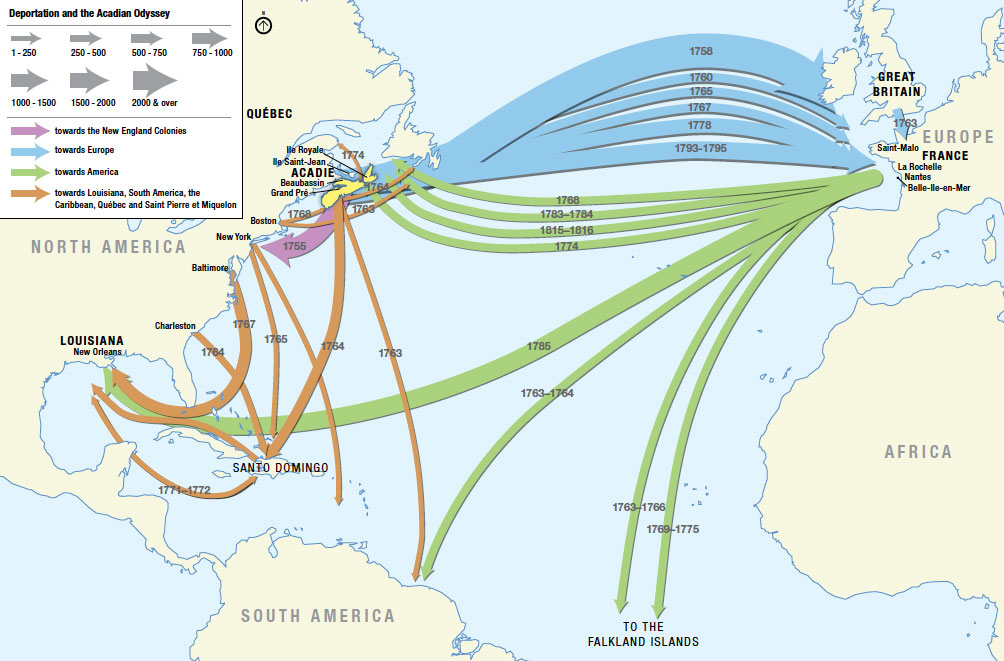
A migratory map showing the movements of Acadian deportees during the Great Upheaval

The British ordered the Acadians expelled from their lands in 1755 during the French and Indian War, an event called the Expulsion of the Acadians or le Grand Dérangement. The "expulsion" resulted in approximately 12,000 Acadians being shipped to destinations throughout Britain's North America and to France, Quebec and the French Caribbean colony of Saint-Domingue. The first wave of the expulsion of the Acadians began with the Bay of Fundy Campaign (1755) and the second wave began after the final Siege of Louisbourg (1758). Many of the Acadians settled in southern Louisiana, creating the Cajun culture there. Some Acadians managed to hide and others eventually returned to Nova Scotia, but they were far outnumbered by a new migration of New England Planters who settled on the former lands of the Acadians and transformed Nova Scotia from a colony of occupation for the British to a settled colony with stronger ties to New England. Britain eventually gained control of Quebec City after the Battle of the Plains of Abraham and the Battle of Fort Niagara in 1759, and finally captured Montreal in 1760.

== Canada under British rule ==
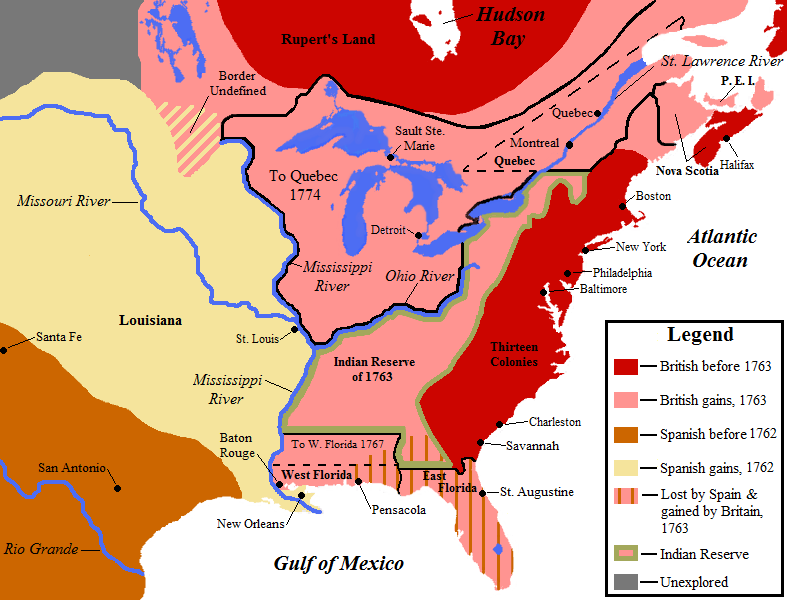
Map showing British territorial gains following the Seven Years' War. Treaty of Paris gains in pink, and Spanish territorial gains after the Treaty of Fontainebleau in yellow.

As part of the terms of the Treaty of Paris (1763), signed after the defeat of New France in the Seven Years' War, France renounced its claims to territory in mainland North America, except for fishing rights off Newfoundland and the two small islands of Saint Pierre and Miquelon where its fishermen could dry their fish. France had already secretly transferred its vast Louisiana territory to Spain under the Treaty of Fontainebleau (1762) in which King Louis XV of France had given his cousin King Charles III of Spain the entire area of the drainage basin of the Mississippi River from the Great Lakes to the Gulf of Mexico and from the Appalachian Mountains to the Rocky Mountains. France and Spain kept the Treaty of Fontainebleau secret from other countries until 1764. However under the Treaty of Paris, the eastern side of the Mississippi river basin became British territory. Great Britain returned to France its most important sugar-producing colony, Guadeloupe, which the French considered more valuable than Canada. (Guadeloupe produced more sugar than all the British islands combined, and Voltaire had notoriously dismissed Canada as "Quelques arpents de neige", "A few acres of snow").

Following the Treaty of Paris, King George III issued the Royal Proclamation of 1763. The proclamation organized Great Britain's new North American empire and stabilized relations between the British Crown and Aboriginal peoples, formally recognizing aboriginal title, regulated trade, settlement, and land purchases on the western frontier. In the former French territory, the new British rulers of Canada first abolished and then later reinstated most of the property, religious, political, and social culture of the French-speaking habitants, guaranteeing the right of the Canadiens to practice the Catholic faith and to the use of French civil law (now Quebec Civil Code) in the Quebec Act of 1774, passed by the British Parliament.

=== American Revolution and the Loyalists ===
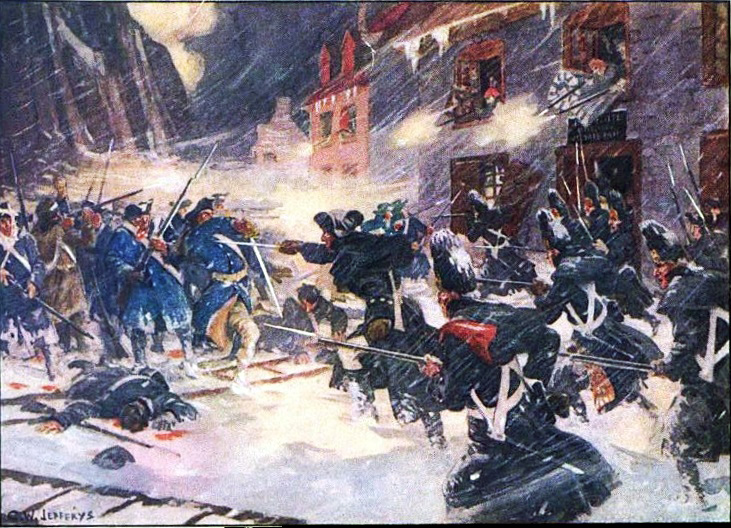
British soldiers and the Canadian militia repel an American column during the Battle of Quebec

During the American Revolution, there was some sympathy for the American cause among the Acadians and the New Englanders in Nova Scotia. Neither party joined the rebels, although several hundred individuals joined the revolutionary cause. An invasion of Quebec by the Continental Army in 1775, with a goal to take Quebec from British control, was halted at the Battle of Quebec by Guy Carleton, with the assistance of local militias. The defeat of the British army during the Siege of Yorktown in October 1781 signalled the end of Great Britain's struggle to suppress the American Revolution.

When the British evacuated New York City in 1783, they took many Loyalist refugees to Nova Scotia, while other Loyalists went to southwestern Quebec. So many Loyalists arrived on the shores of the St. John River that a separate colony—New Brunswick—was created in 1784; followed in 1791 by the division of Quebec into the largely French-speaking Lower Canada (French Canada) along the St. Lawrence River and the Gaspé Peninsula and an anglophone Loyalist Upper Canada, with its capital settled by 1796 in York (present-day Toronto). After 1790, most of the new settlers were American farmers searching for new lands; although generally favourable to republicanism, they were relatively non-political and stayed neutral in the War of 1812. In 1785, Saint John, New Brunswick became the first incorporated city in what would later become Canada.

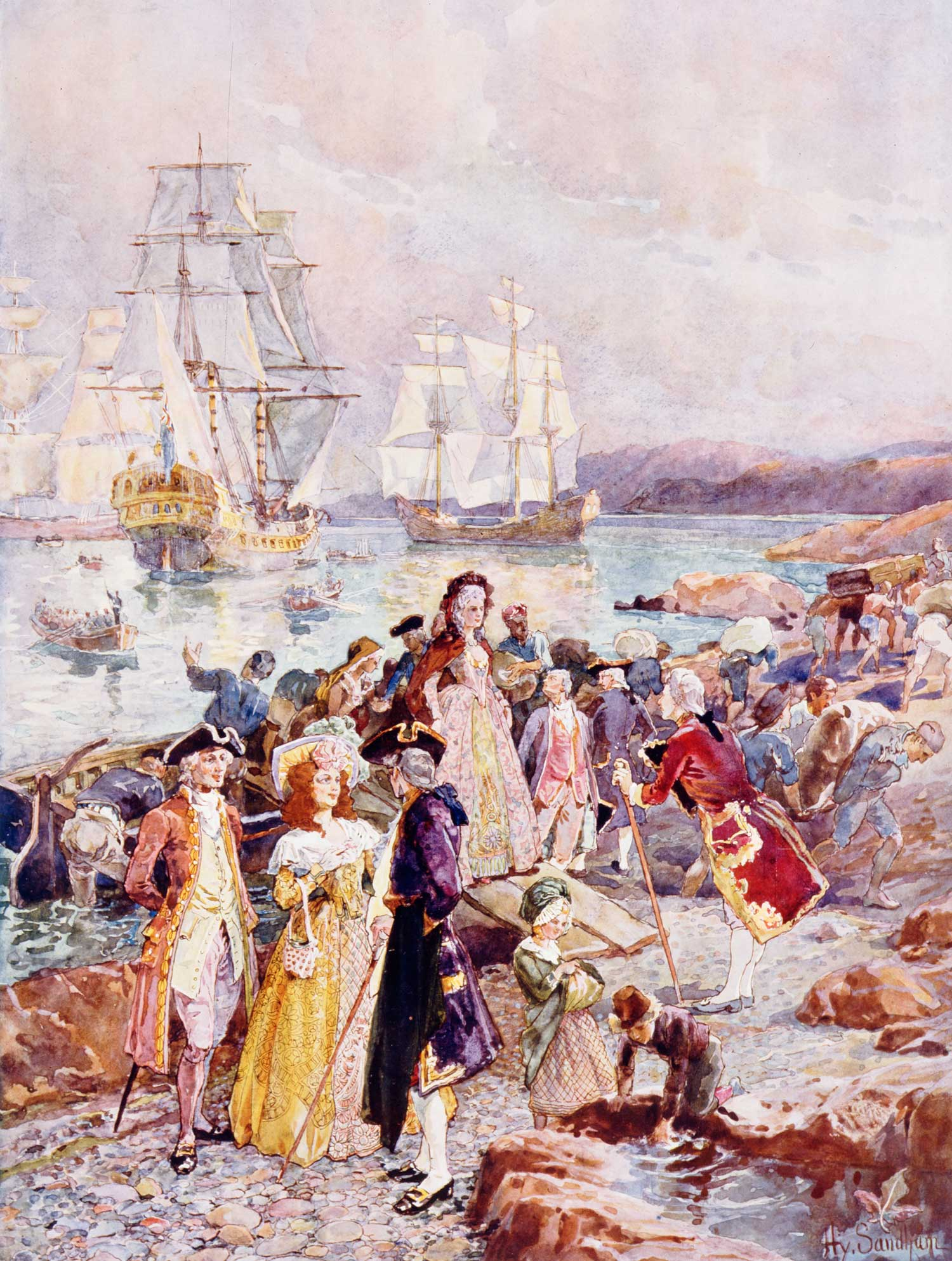
Landing of loyalist migrants to New Brunswick, 1783. After the American Revolutionary War, the remaining British North American colonies saw an influx of loyalist migrants.

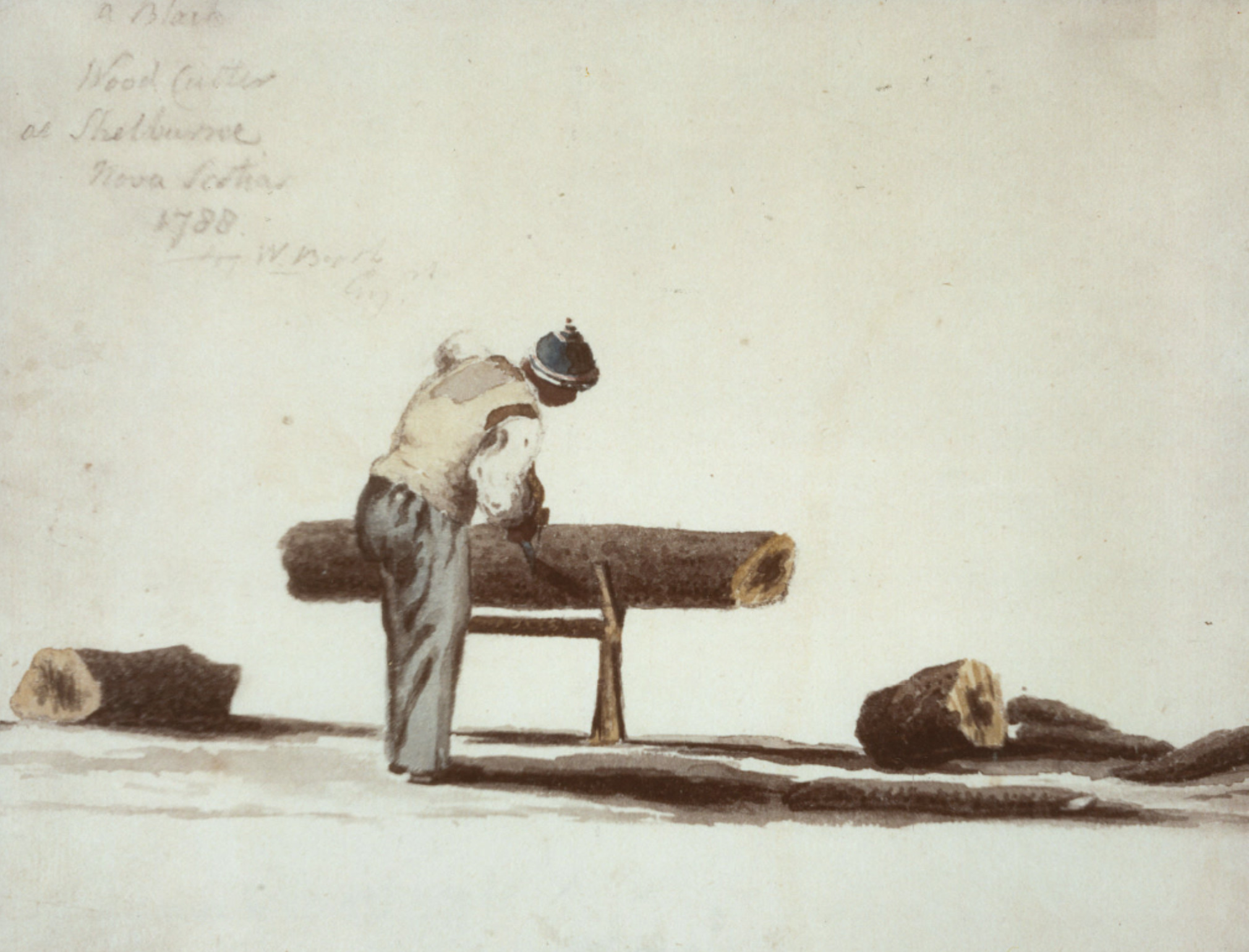
1788 illustration of a Black woodcutter in Shelburne, Nova Scotia

The signing of the Treaty of Paris in 1783 formally ended the war. Great Britain made several concessions to the US at the expense of the North American colonies. Notably, the borders between Canada and the United States were officially demarcated; all land south and west of the Great Lakes, which was formerly a part of the Province of Quebec and included modern-day Michigan, Wisconsin, Illinois, Indiana and Ohio, was ceded to the Americans. Fishing rights were also granted to the United States in the Gulf of St. Lawrence and on the coast of Newfoundland and the Grand Banks. The British ignored part of the treaty and maintained their military outposts in the Great Lakes areas it had ceded to the U.S., and they continued to supply their native allies with munitions. The British evacuated the outposts with the Jay Treaty of 1795, but the continued supply of munitions irritated the Americans in the run-up to the War of 1812.

Canadian historians have had mixed views on the long-term impact of the American Revolution. Arthur Lower in the 1950s provided the long-standard historical interpretation that for English Canada the results were counter-revolutionary:

[English Canada] inherited, not the benefits, but the bitterness of the Revolution…. English Canada started its life with as powerful a nostalgic shove backward into the past as the Conquest had given to French Canada: two little peoples officially devoted to counter-revolution, to lost causes, to the tawdry ideals of a society of men and masters, and not to the self-reliant freedom alongside of them.

Recently Michel Ducharme has agreed that Canada did indeed oppose "republican liberty", as exemplified by the United States and France. However, he says it did find a different path forward when it fought against British rulers after 1837 to secure "modern liberty". That form of liberty focused not on the virtues of citizens but on protecting their rights from infringement by the state.

=== War of 1812 ===
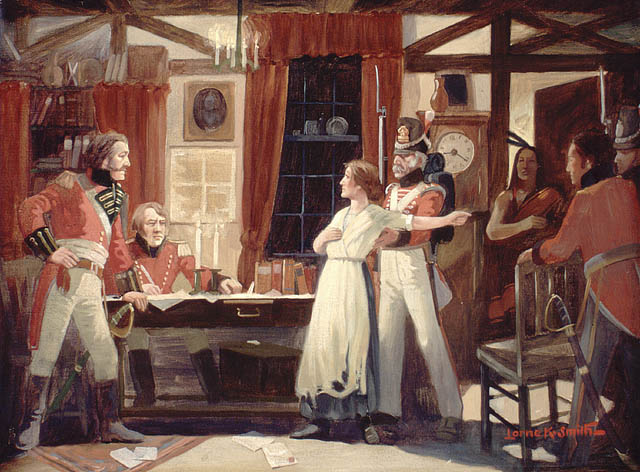
Loyalist Laura Secord warning the British Lieutenant James FitzGibbon and First Nations of an impending American attack at Beaver Dams, 1813

The War of 1812 was fought between the United States and the British, with the British North American colonies being heavily involved. Greatly outgunned by the British Royal Navy, the American war plans focused on an invasion of Canada (especially what is today eastern and western Ontario). The American frontier states voted for war to suppress the First Nations raids that frustrated the settlement of the frontier. The war on the border with the United States was characterized by a series of multiple failed invasions and fiascos on both sides. American forces took control of Lake Erie in 1813, driving the British out of western Ontario, killing the Shawnee leader Tecumseh, and breaking the military power of his confederacy. The war was overseen by British army officers like Isaac Brock and Charles de Salaberry with the assistance of First Nations and loyalist informants, most notably Laura Secord.

The War ended with no boundary changes thanks to the Treaty of Ghent of 1814, and the Rush–Bagot Treaty of 1817. A demographic result was the shifting of the destination of American migration from Upper Canada to Ohio, Indiana and Michigan, without fear of Indigenous attacks. After the war, supporters of Britain tried to repress the republicanism that was common among American immigrants to Canada. The troubling memory of the war and the American invasions etched itself into the consciousness of Canadians as a distrust of the intentions of the United States towards the British presence in North America.^{pp. 254–255}

=== Rebellions and the Durham Report ===
Leaders of the Patriote movement and their followers during the Assembly of the Six Counties in 1837.

The rebellions of 1837 against the British colonial government took place in both Upper and Lower Canada. In Upper Canada, a band of Reformers under the leadership of William Lyon Mackenzie took up arms in a disorganized and ultimately unsuccessful series of small-scale skirmishes around Toronto, London, and Hamilton.

In Lower Canada, a more substantial rebellion occurred against British rule. Both English- and French-Canadian rebels, sometimes using bases in the neutral United States, fought several skirmishes against the authorities. The towns of Chambly and Sorel were taken by the rebels, and Quebec City was isolated from the rest of the colony. Montreal rebel leader Robert Nelson read the "Declaration of Independence of Lower Canada" to a crowd assembled at the town of Napierville in 1838. The rebellion of the Patriote movement was defeated after battles across Quebec. Hundreds were arrested, and several villages were burnt in reprisal.

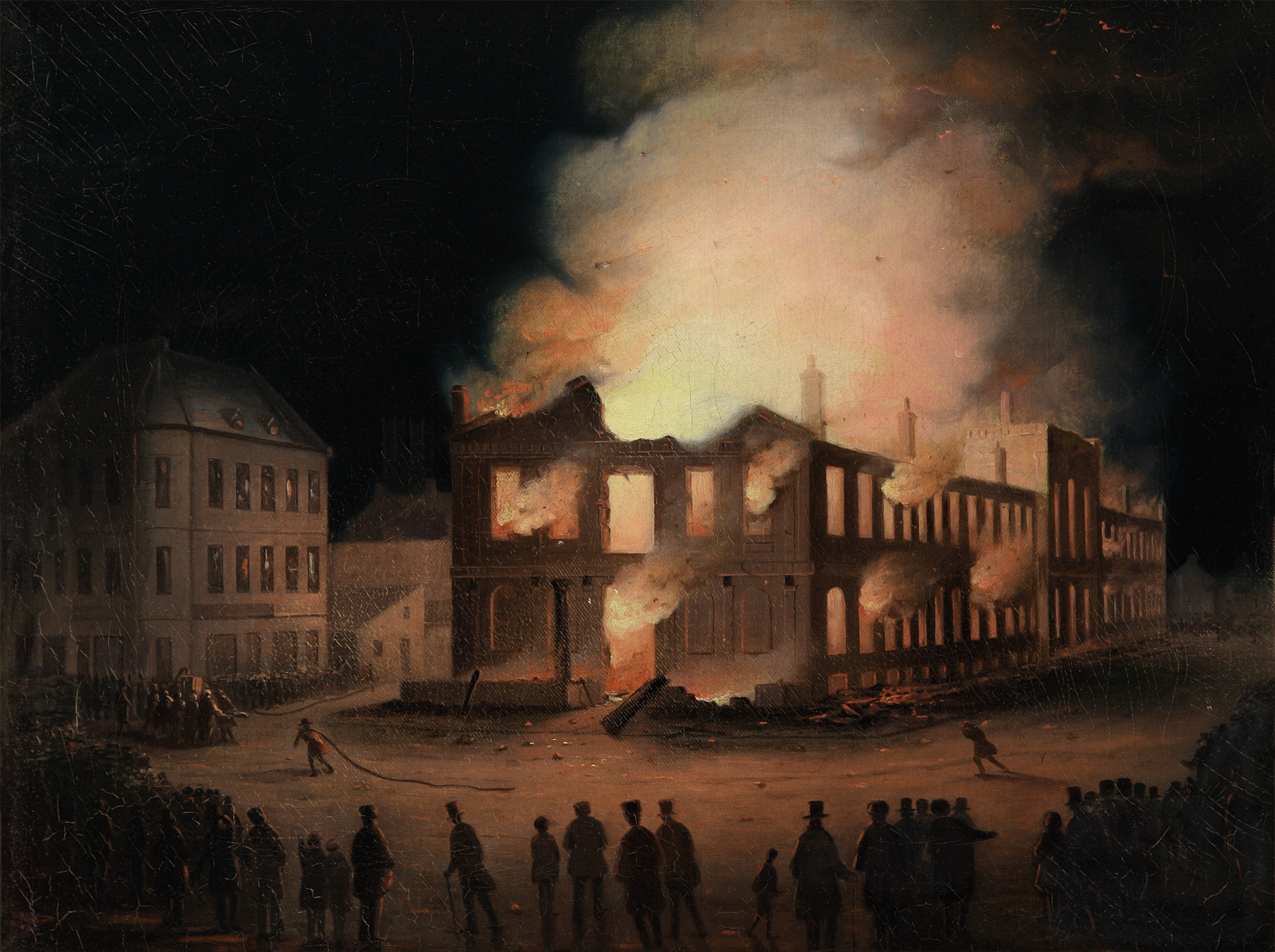
The burning of the Parliament Buildings in Montreal in 1849. Painting by Joseph Légaré, c. 1849.

The British government then sent Lord Durham to examine the situation; he stayed in Canada for five months before returning to Britain, bringing with him his Durham Report, which strongly recommended responsible government. A less well-received recommendation was the amalgamation of Upper and Lower Canada for the deliberate assimilation of the French-speaking population. The Canadas were merged into a single colony, the United Province of Canada, by the 1840 Act of Union, and responsible government was achieved in 1848, a few months after it was accomplished in Nova Scotia. The parliament of United Canada in Montreal was set on fire by a mob of Tories in 1849 after the passing of an indemnity bill for the people who suffered losses during the rebellion in Lower Canada.

Between the Napoleonic Wars and 1850, some 800,000 immigrants came to the colonies of British North America, mainly from the British Isles, as part of the great migration of Canada. These included Gaelic-speaking Highland Scots displaced by the Highland Clearances to Nova Scotia and Scottish and English settlers to the Canadas, particularly Upper Canada. The Irish Famine of the 1840s significantly increased the pace of Irish Catholic immigration to British North America, with over 35,000 distressed Irish landing in Toronto alone in 1847 and 1848.

=== Pacific colonies ===
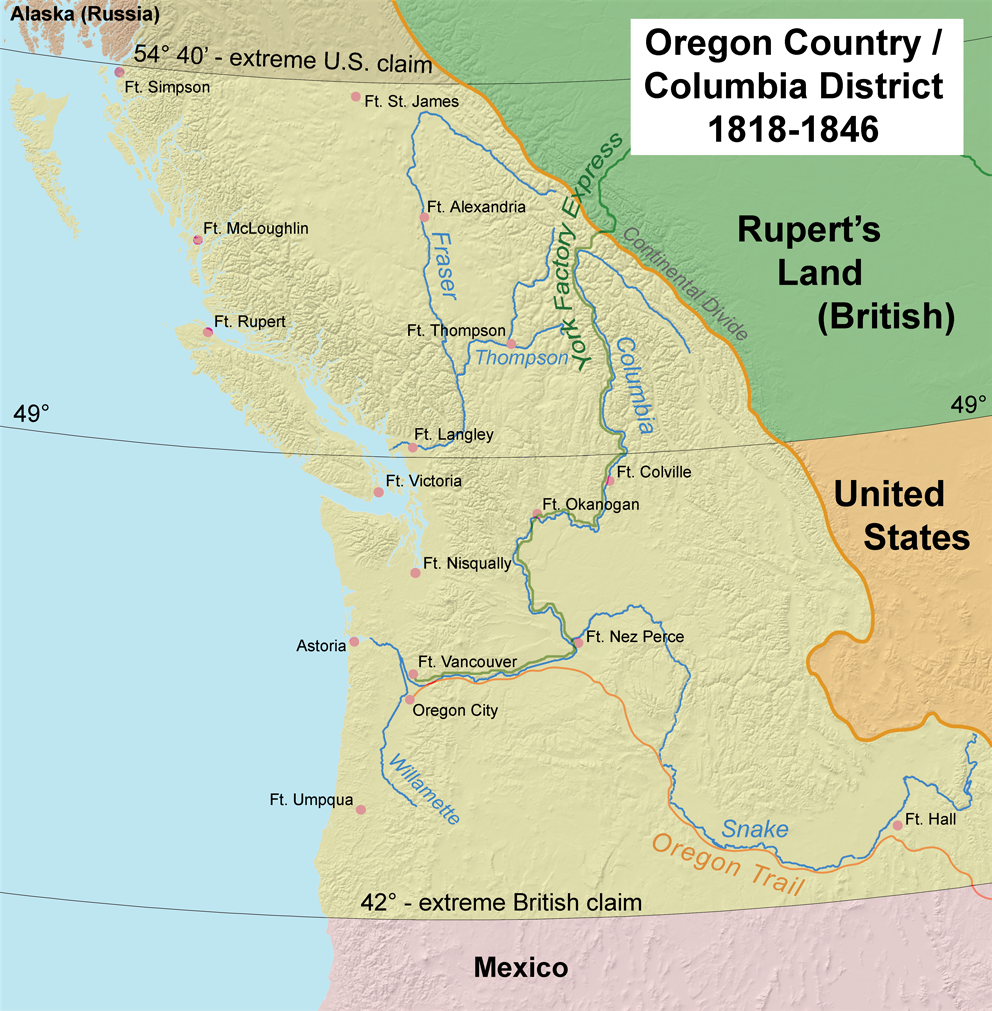
Map of the Columbia District, also referred to as Oregon Country. The region was disputed territory between the UK and the US until 1846, with the signing of the Oregon Treaty.

Spanish explorers had taken the lead in the Pacific Northwest coast, with the voyages of Juan José Pérez Hernández in 1774 and 1775. By the time the Spanish determined to build a fort on Vancouver Island, the British navigator James Cook had visited Nootka Sound and charted the coast as far as Alaska, while British and American maritime fur traders had begun a busy era of commerce with the coastal peoples to satisfy the brisk market for sea otter pelts in China, thereby launching what became known as the China Trade. In 1789 war threatened between Britain and Spain on their respective rights; the Nootka Crisis was resolved peacefully largely in favour of Britain, the much stronger naval power at the time. In 1793 Alexander MacKenzie, a Scotsman working for the North West Company, crossed the continent and with his Aboriginal guides and French-Canadian crew, reached the mouth of the Bella Coola River, completing the first continental crossing north of Mexico, missing George Vancouver's charting expedition to the region by only a few weeks. In 1821, the North West Company and Hudson's Bay Company merged, with a combined trading territory that was extended by a licence to the North-Western Territory and the Columbia and New Caledonia fur districts, which reached the Arctic Ocean on the north and the Pacific Ocean on the west.

The Colony of Vancouver Island was chartered in 1849, with the trading post at Fort Victoria as the capital. This was followed by the Colony of the Queen Charlotte Islands in 1853, and by the creation of the Colony of British Columbia in 1858 and the Stikine Territory in 1861, with the latter three being founded expressly to keep those regions from being overrun and annexed by American gold miners. The Colony of the Queen Charlotte Islands and most of the Stikine Territory were merged into the Colony of British Columbia in 1863 (the remainder, north of the 60th Parallel, became part of the North-Western Territory).

=== Rural Canada in 1860s ===
The 1940 "Report" of the Rowell–Sirois Commission described the economy of rural Canada in the late 1860s, when just under half the labor force was in farming. It stated:

The farm household in Upper Canada [Ontario] was still a basically self-sufficient unit. Food was grown and processed at home. The raw products of the farm were turned into articles of wear with the assistance of the local shoemaker and tailor who would take produce in return for their services. Such necessaries as tea, sugar, hardware and certain articles of clothing which could not be produced at home were generally obtained by barter from the local general store. Tallow was turned into candles, fatty refuse into soap, and the tools which were beyond the ingenuity of the farm workshop could generally be contrived by the local blacksmith. What was true of the Upper Canada farm was even more true of the agricultural communities in Lower Canada [Quebec] and the Maritimes, where such things as furniture, carts, and carriages were frequently made on the farm. The farm of the period was a miniature factory or combination of factories. Much of the work of the large industrial army of today, concentrated in highly specialized factories in the cities and towns was, in that early period, performed in a multitude of rural households. However prices might fall and cash income from other sources might melt away, the farm household always produced enough to prevent abject poverty. This fact had its importance for other industries as well. The farm was often a base of operations, on which individuals could fall back when other projects and occupations ended in disaster. In the Maritimes, agriculture, fishing and lumbering were closely allied. Everywhere the family and its relatives were a close economic unit; the various members helped one another when new enterprises were started or old ones failed. The material basis for this mutual welfare association was the family farm.

== Confederation ==
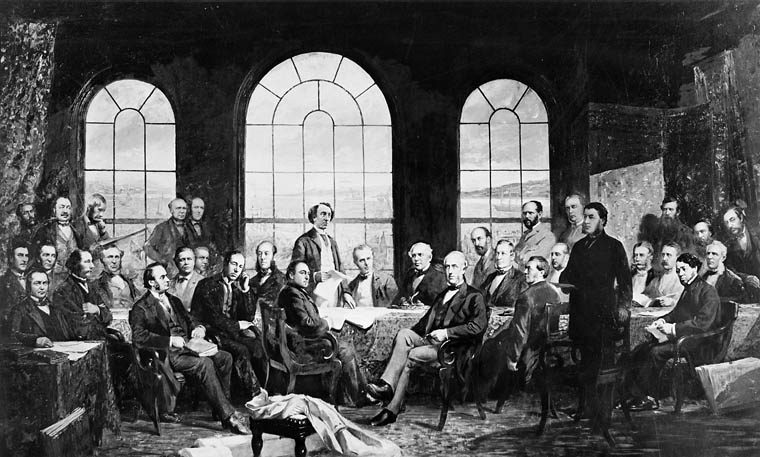
1885 photo of Robert Harris' 1884 painting, Conference at Quebec in 1864. The scene is an amalgamation of the Charlottetown and Quebec City conference sites and attendees, the Fathers of Confederation.

The Seventy-Two Resolutions from the 1864 Quebec Conference and Charlottetown Conference laid out the framework for uniting British colonies in North America into a federation. The Resolutions became the basis for the London Conference of 1866, which led to the formation of the Dominion of Canada on July 1, 1867. The term dominion was chosen to indicate Canada's status as a self-governing polity of the British Empire, the first time it was used about a country. With the coming into force of the British North America Act, 1867 (enacted by the British Parliament), Canada became a federated country in its own right. (According to James Bowden, writing in The Dorchester Review, "Ottawa turned its back on 'Dominion' in the 1940s and 1950s," impelled by what historian C. P. Champion referred to as "neo-nationalism.") Federation emerged from multiple impulses: the British wanted Canada to defend itself; the Maritimes needed railroad connections, which were promised in 1867; English-Canadian nationalism sought to unite the lands into one country, dominated by the English language and loyalist culture; many French-Canadians saw an opportunity to exert political control within a new largely French-speaking Quebec^{pp. 323–324} and exaggerated fears of possible U.S. expansion northward. On a political level, there was a desire for the expansion of responsible government and elimination of the legislative deadlock between Upper and Lower Canada, and their replacement with provincial legislatures in a federation. This was especially pushed by the liberal Reform movement of Upper Canada and the French-Canadian Parti rouge in Lower Canada who favoured a decentralized union in comparison to the Upper Canadian Conservative party and to some degree the French-Canadian Parti bleu, which favoured a centralized union.

=== Territorial expansion west (1867–1914) ===
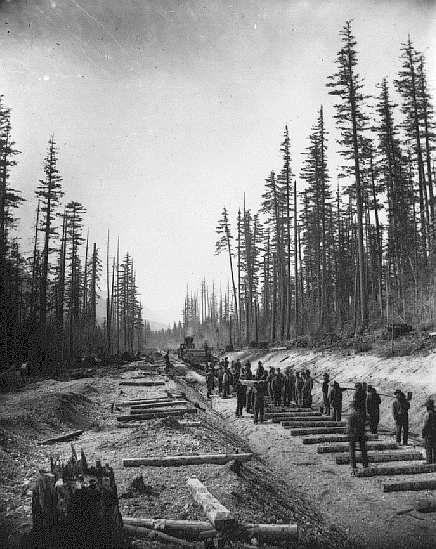
Construction for the Canadian Pacific Railway at the lower Fraser Valley in 1881

Using the lure of the Canadian Pacific Railway, a transcontinental line that would unite the nation, Ottawa attracted support in the Maritimes and in British Columbia. In 1866, the Colony of British Columbia and the Colony of Vancouver Island merged into a single Colony of British Columbia. After Rupert's Land was transferred to Canada by Britain in 1870, connecting to the eastern provinces, British Columbia joined Canada in 1871. In 1873, Prince Edward Island joined. Newfoundland—which had no use for a transcontinental railway—voted no in 1869, and did not join Canada until 1949.

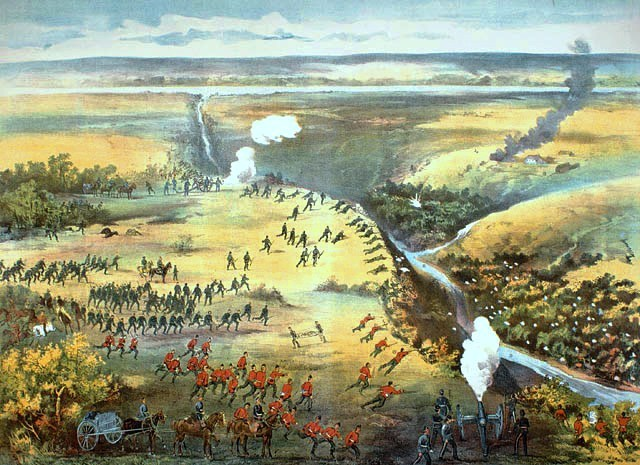
The Battle of Fish Creek in 1885 was a Métis victory over the Canadian Militia during the North-West Rebellion

In 1873, John A. Macdonald (First Prime Minister of Canada) created the North-West Mounted Police (now the Royal Canadian Mounted Police) to help police the Northwest Territories. Specifically the Mounties were to assert Canadian sovereignty to prevent possible American encroachments into the area. The Mounties' first large-scale mission was to suppress the second independence movement by Manitoba's Métis, a mixed-blood people of joint First Nations and European descent, who originated in the mid-17th century. The desire for independence erupted in the Red River Rebellion in 1869 and the later North-West Rebellion in 1885 led by Louis Riel. Suppressing the Rebellion was Canada's first independent military action and demonstrated the need to complete the Canadian Pacific Railway. It guaranteed Anglophone control of the Prairies and demonstrated the national government was capable of decisive action. However, it lost the Conservative Party most of their support in Quebec and led to a permanent distrust of the Anglophone community on the part of the Francophones.

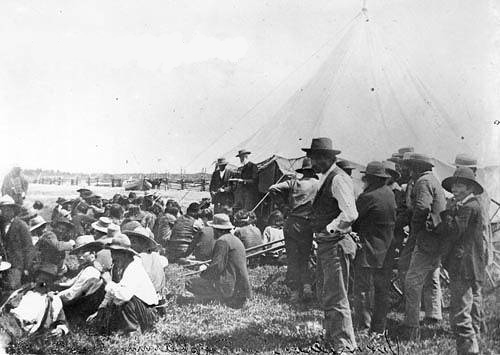
The lieutenant governor of the North-West Territories explaining the terms of Treaty 8 to First Nations at Fort Vermilion, 1899

As Canada expanded, the Canadian government rather than the British Crown negotiated treaties with the resident First Nations' peoples, beginning with Treaty 1 in 1871. The treaties extinguished aboriginal title on traditional territories, created reserves for the indigenous peoples' exclusive use, and opened up the rest of the territory for settlement. Indigenous people were induced to move to these new reserves, sometimes forcibly. The government imposed the Indian Act in 1876 to govern the relations between the federal government and the Indigenous peoples and govern the relations between the new settlers and the Indigenous peoples. Under the Indian Act, the government started the Residential School System to convert the Indigenous peoples to "industrious Christian Canadians" and extinguish native language and culture.

In the 1890s, legal experts codified a framework of criminal law, culminating in The Criminal Code, 1892. This solidified the liberal ideal of "equality before the law" in a way that made an abstract principle into a tangible reality for every adult Canadian. Wilfrid Laurier who served 1896–1911 as the Seventh Prime Minister of Canada felt Canada was on the verge of becoming a world power, and declared that the 20th century would "belong to Canada"

The Alaska boundary dispute, simmering since the Alaska Purchase of 1867, became critical when gold was discovered in the Yukon during the late 1890s, with the U.S. controlling all the possible ports of entry. Canada argued its boundary included the port of Skagway. The dispute went to arbitration in 1903, but the British delegate sided with the Americans, angering Canadians who felt the British had betrayed Canadian interests to curry favour with the U.S.

In 1905, Saskatchewan and Alberta were admitted as provinces. They were growing rapidly thanks to abundant wheat crops that attracted immigration to the plains by Ukrainians and Northern and Central Europeans and by settlers from the United States, Britain and eastern Canada.

Laurier signed a reciprocity treaty with the U.S. that would lower tariffs in both directions. Conservatives under Robert Borden denounced it, saying it would integrate Canada's economy into that of the U.S. and loosen ties with Britain. The Conservative party won the 1911 Canadian federal election.

== World Wars and Interwar Years (1914–1945) ==
=== First World War ===
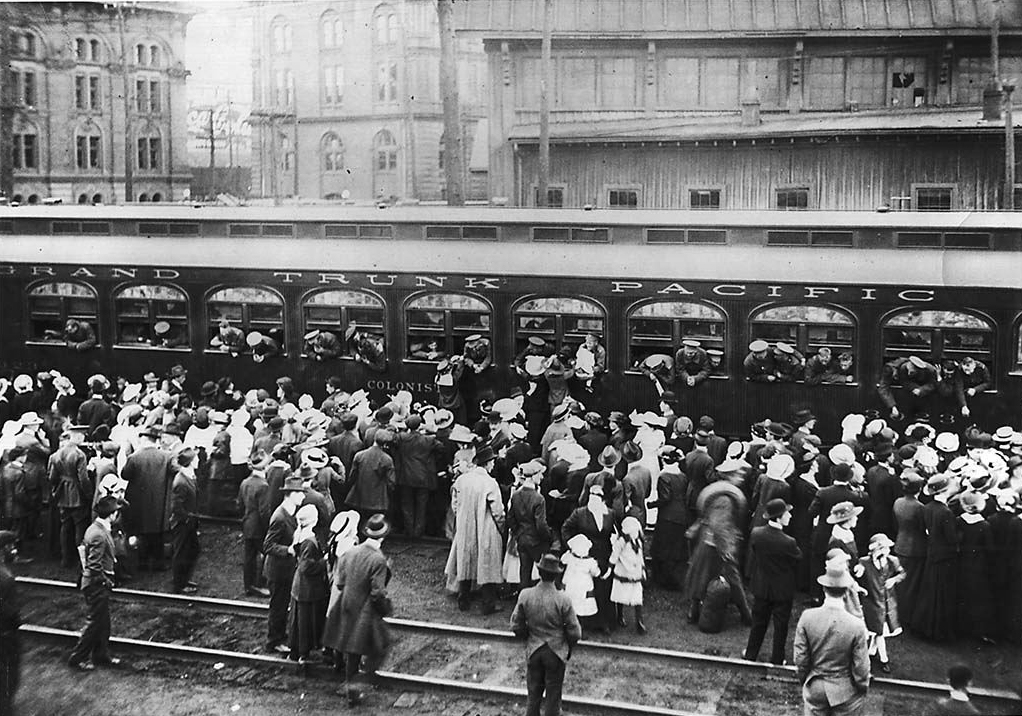
A train filled with soldiers departs from Toronto's Union Station shortly after World War I began in 1914

The Canadian Forces and civilian participation in the First World War helped to foster a sense of British-Canadian nationhood. The highpoints of Canadian military achievement during the First World War came during the Somme, Vimy, Passchendaele battles and what later became known as "Canada's Hundred Days". The reputation Canadian troops earned, along with the success of Canadian flying aces including William George Barker and Billy Bishop, helped to give the nation a new sense of identity. The War Office in 1922 reported approximately 67,000 killed and 173,000 wounded during the war. This excludes civilian deaths in war-time incidents like the Halifax Explosion.

Support for Great Britain during the First World War caused a major political crisis over conscription, with Francophones, mainly from Quebec, rejecting national policies. During the crisis, large numbers of enemy aliens (especially German and Ukrainian immigrants) were put under government controls. The Liberal party was deeply split, with most of its Anglophone leaders joining the unionist government headed by Prime Minister Borden, the leader of the Conservative party. The Liberals regained their influence after the war under the leadership of William Lyon Mackenzie King, who served as prime minister with three separate terms between 1921 and 1949.

=== Women's suffrage ===
When Canada was founded, women could not vote in federal elections. Women did have a local vote in some provinces, as in Canada West from 1850, where women owning land could vote for school trustees. By 1900 other provinces adopted similar provisions, and in 1916 Manitoba took the lead in extending full women's suffrage. Simultaneously suffragists gave strong support to the prohibition movement, especially in Ontario and the Western provinces.

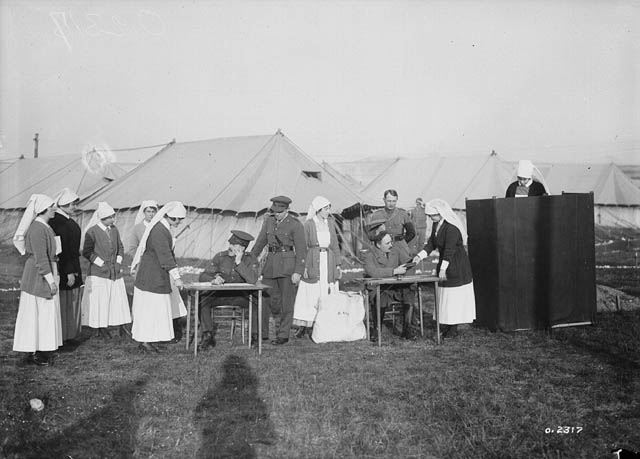
Nursing sisters at the Canadian hospital in France during the First World War casting their votes for the 1917 general election

The Military Voters Act of 1917 gave the vote to British women who were war widows or had sons or husbands serving overseas. Unionist Prime Minister Borden pledged himself during the 1917 campaign to equal suffrage for women. After his landslide victory, he introduced a bill in 1918 for extending the franchise to women. This passed without division but did not apply to Quebec provincial and municipal elections. The women of Quebec gained full suffrage in 1940. The first woman elected to Parliament was Agnes Macphail of Ontario in 1921.

=== 1920s ===
==== On the world stage ====
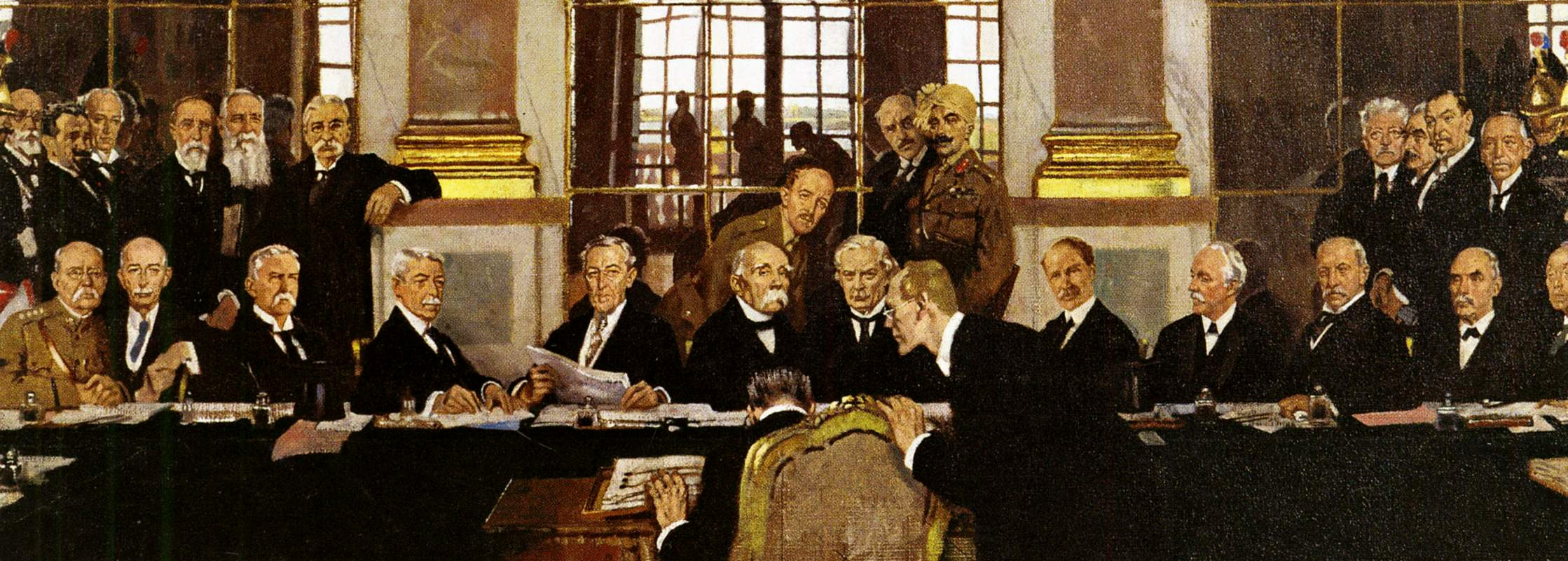
The German delegate is portrayed signing the peace treaties at the Paris Peace Conference, surrounded by Allied delegates. The Canadian delegate, George Foster is visible in the back row (fourth from the left), in the Hall of Mirrors at the Palace of Versailles

Convinced that Canada had proven itself on the battlefields of Europe, Prime Minister Borden demanded that it have a separate seat at the Paris Peace Conference in 1919. This was initially opposed not only by Britain but also by the United States, which saw such a delegation as an extra British vote. Borden responded by pointing out that since Canada had lost nearly 60,000 men, a far larger proportion of its men, its right to equal status as a nation had been consecrated on the battlefield. British Prime Minister David Lloyd George eventually relented, and convinced the reluctant Americans to accept the presence of delegations from Canada, India, Australia, Newfoundland, New Zealand, and South Africa. These also received their own seats in the League of Nations. Canada asked for neither reparations nor mandates. It played only a modest role in Paris, but just having a seat was a matter of pride. It was cautiously optimistic about the new League of Nations, in which it played an active and independent role.

In 1922 British Prime Minister David Lloyd George appealed repeatedly for Canadian support in the Chanak crisis, in which a war threatened between Britain and Turkey. Canada refused, leading to the fall of Lloyd George. The Department of External Affairs, which had been founded in 1909, was expanded and promoted Canadian autonomy as Canada reduced its reliance on British diplomats and used its own foreign service. Thus began the careers of such important diplomats as Norman Robertson and Hume Wrong, and future prime minister Lester Pearson.

In the 1920s, Canada set up a successful wheat marketing "pool" to keep prices high. Canada negotiated with the United States, Australia, and the Soviet Union to expand the pool, but the effort failed when the Great Depression caused distrust and low prices.

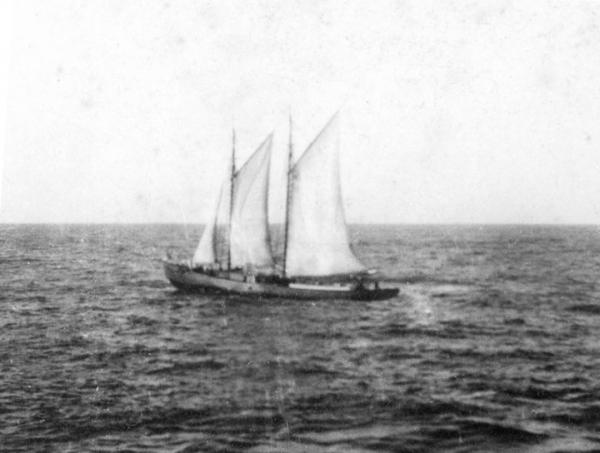
I'm Alone, a Canadian ship used to smuggle alcohol across the border during the alcohol prohibition era in the United States

With prohibition underway in the United States, smugglers bought large quantities of Canadian liquor. Both the Canadian distillers and the U.S. State Department put heavy pressure on the Customs and Excise Department to loosen or tighten border controls. Liquor interests paid off corrupt Canadian border officials until the U.S. finally ended prohibition in 1933.

==== Domestic affairs ====
In 1921 to 1926, William Lyon Mackenzie King's Liberal government pursued a conservative domestic policy with the object of lowering wartime taxes and, especially, cooling wartime ethnic tensions, as well as defusing postwar labour conflicts. The Progressives refused to join the government but did help the Liberals defeat non-confidence motions. King faced a delicate balancing act of reducing tariffs enough to please the Prairie-based Progressives, but not too much to alienate his vital support in industrial Ontario and Quebec, which needed tariffs to compete with American imports. King and Conservative leader Arthur Meighen sparred constantly and bitterly in Commons debates. The Progressives gradually weakened. Their effective and passionate leader, Thomas Crerar, resigned to return to his grain business, and was replaced by the more placid Robert Forke. The socialist reformer J. S. Woodsworth gradually gained influence and power among the Progressives, and he reached an accommodation with King on policy matters.

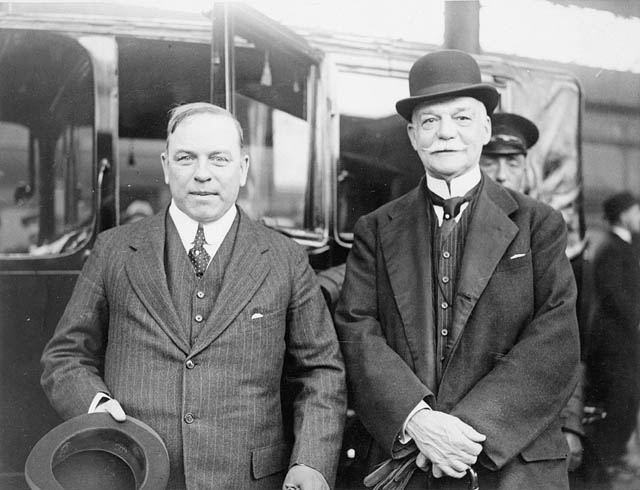
Prime Minister William Lyon Mackenzie King (left) at the 1926 Imperial Conference in London. King sought to redefine the role of governor general at the conference, as a result of the King-Byng affair earlier that year.

In 1926 Prime Minister Mackenzie King advised the Governor General, Lord Byng, to dissolve Parliament and call another election, but Byng refused, the only time that the Governor General has exercised such a power. Instead, Byng called upon Meighen, the Conservative Party leader, to form a government. Meighen attempted to do so but was unable to obtain a majority in the Commons and he, too, advised dissolution, which this time was accepted. The episode, the King–Byng affair, marks a constitutional crisis that was resolved by a new tradition of complete non-interference in Canadian political affairs on the part of the British government.

=== Great Depression ===
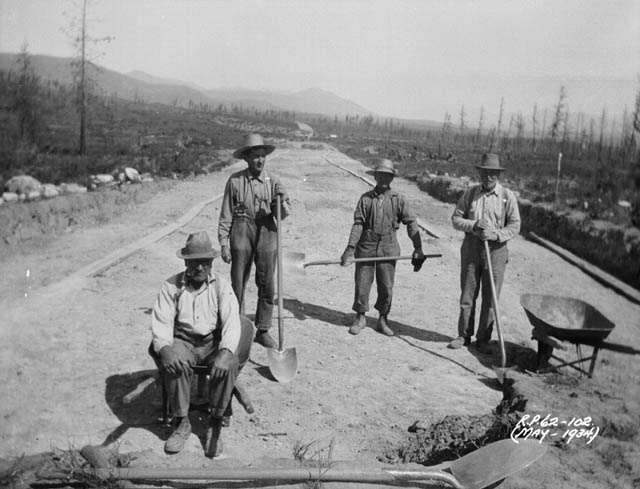
Road construction between Kimberley and Wasa, British Columbia by Relief Project workers, 1934

Canada was hit hard by the worldwide Great Depression that began in 1929. Between 1929 and 1933, the gross national product dropped 40 per cent (compared to 37 per cent in the US). Unemployment reached 27 per cent at the depth of the Depression in 1933. Many businesses closed, as corporate profits of $396 million in 1929 turned into losses of $98 million in 1933. Canadian exports shrank by 50% from 1929 to 1933. Construction all but stopped (down 82 per cent, 1929–33), and wholesale prices dropped 30%. Wheat prices plunged from 78c per bushel (1928 crop) to 29c in 1932.

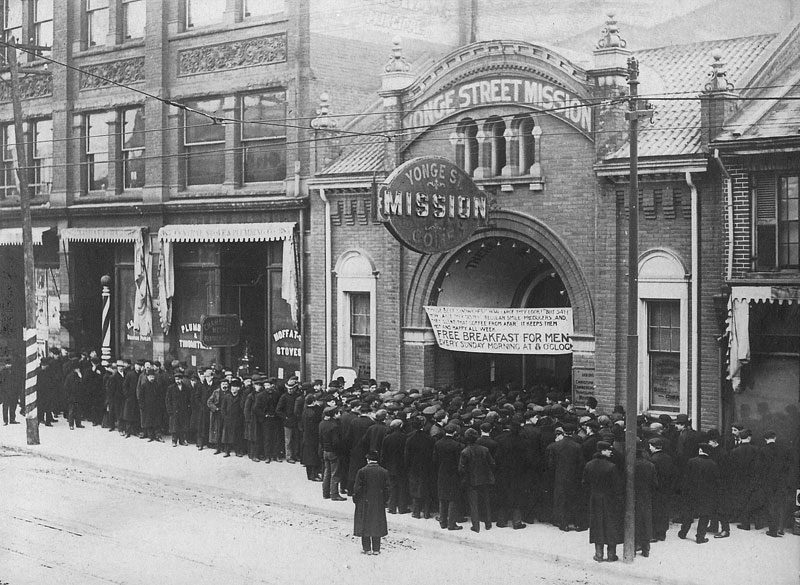
A crowd gathers for free food at the Yonge Street Mission in Toronto during the Great Depression

Urban unemployment nationwide was 19 per cent; Toronto's rate was 17 per cent, according to the census of 1931. Farmers who stayed on their farms were not considered unemployed. By 1933, 30 per cent of the labour force was out of work, and one-fifth of the population became dependent on government assistance. Wages fell as did prices. The worst hit were areas dependent on primary industries such as farming, mining and logging, as prices fell and there were few alternative jobs. Most families had moderate losses and little hardship, though they too became pessimistic and their debts became heavier as prices fell. Some families saw most or all of their assets disappear and suffered severely.

In 1930, in the first stage of the long depression, Prime Minister Mackenzie King believed that the crisis was a temporary swing of the business cycle and that the economy would soon recover without government intervention. He refused to provide unemployment relief or federal aid to the provinces, saying that if Conservative provincial governments demanded federal dollars, he would not give them "a five-cent piece." The main issue was the rapid deterioration in the economy and whether the prime minister was out of touch with the hardships of ordinary people. The winner of the 1930 election was Richard Bedford Bennett and the Conservatives. Bennett had promised high tariffs and large-scale spending, but as deficits increased, he became wary and cut back severely on Federal spending. With falling support and the depression getting only worse, Bennett attempted to introduce policies based on the New Deal of President Franklin D. Roosevelt (FDR) in the United States, but he got little passed. Bennett's government became a focus of popular discontent. For example, auto owners saved on gasoline by using horses to pull their cars, dubbing them Bennett Buggies. The Conservative failure to restore prosperity led to the return of Mackenzie King's Liberals in the 1935 election.

In 1935, the Liberals used the slogan "King or Chaos" to win a landslide in the 1935 election. Promising a much-desired trade treaty with the U.S., the Mackenzie King government passed the 1935 Reciprocal Trade Agreement. It marked the turning point in Canadian-American economic relations, reversing the disastrous trade war of 1930–31, lowering tariffs and yielding a dramatic increase in trade.

The worst of the Depression had passed by 1935, as the Government of Canada launched relief programs such as the National Housing Act and the National Employment Commission. The Canadian Broadcasting Corporation became a crown corporation in 1936. Trans-Canada Airlines (the precursor to Air Canada) was formed in 1937, as was the National Film Board of Canada in 1939. In 1938, Parliament transformed the Bank of Canada from a private entity to a crown corporation.

One political response was a highly restrictive immigration policy and a rise in nativism.

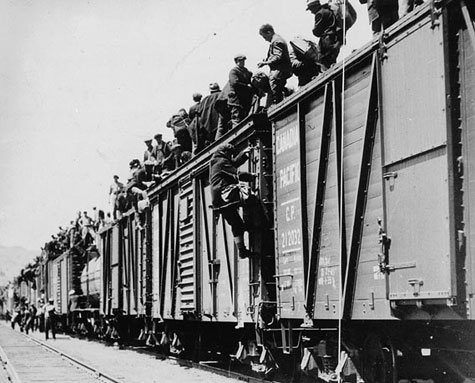
Strikers from unemployment relief camps on a train in Kamloops, en route to Eastern Canada, 1935

Times were especially hard in western Canada, where a full recovery did not occur until the Second World War began in 1939. One response was the creation of new political parties such as the Social Credit movement and the Cooperative Commonwealth Federation, as well as popular protest in the form of the On-to-Ottawa Trek.

=== Statute of Westminster ===
Following the Balfour Declaration of 1926, the British Parliament passed the Statute of Westminster in 1931 which acknowledged Canada as coequal with the United Kingdom and the other Commonwealth realms. It was a crucial step in the development of Canada as a separate state in that it provided for nearly complete legislative autonomy from the Parliament of the United Kingdom. Although the United Kingdom retained formal authority over certain Canadian constitutional changes, it relinquished this authority with the passing of the Canada Act 1982 which was the final step in achieving full sovereignty.

=== Second World War ===
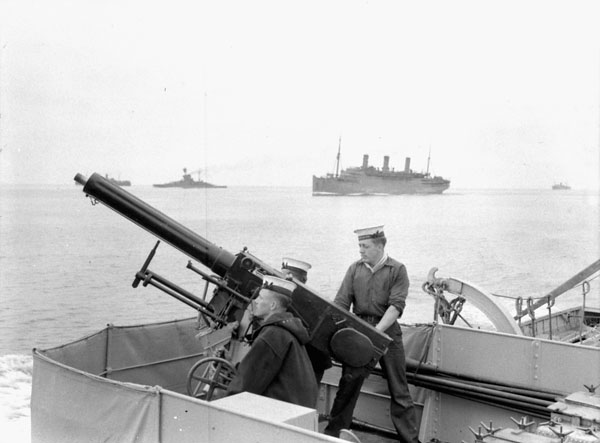
A convoy from Halifax en route to the UK, taken from HMCS Assiniboine in 1940

Canada's involvement in the Second World War began when Canada declared war on Nazi Germany on September 10, 1939, delaying it one week after Britain acted to symbolically demonstrate independence. Canada played a major role in supplying food, raw materials, munitions and money to the hard-pressed British economy, training airmen for the Commonwealth, guarding the western half of the North Atlantic Ocean against German U-boats, and providing combat troops for the invasions of Italy, France and Germany in 1943–45.

Of a population of approximately 11.5 million, 1.1 million Canadians served in the armed forces in the Second World War. Many thousands more served with the Canadian Merchant Navy. In all, more than 45,000 died, and another 55,000 were wounded. Building up the Royal Canadian Air Force was a high priority; it was kept separate from Britain's Royal Air Force. The British Commonwealth Air Training Plan Agreement, signed in December 1939, bound Canada, Britain, New Zealand, and Australia to a program that eventually trained half the airmen from those four nations in the Second World War.

The Battle of the Atlantic began immediately, and from 1943 to 1945 was led by Leonard W. Murray, from Nova Scotia. German U-boats operated in Canadian and Newfoundland waters throughout the war, sinking many naval and merchant vessels. The Canadian army was involved in the failed defence of Hong Kong, the unsuccessful Dieppe Raid in August 1942, the Allied invasion of Italy, and the highly successful invasion of France and the Netherlands in 1944–45.

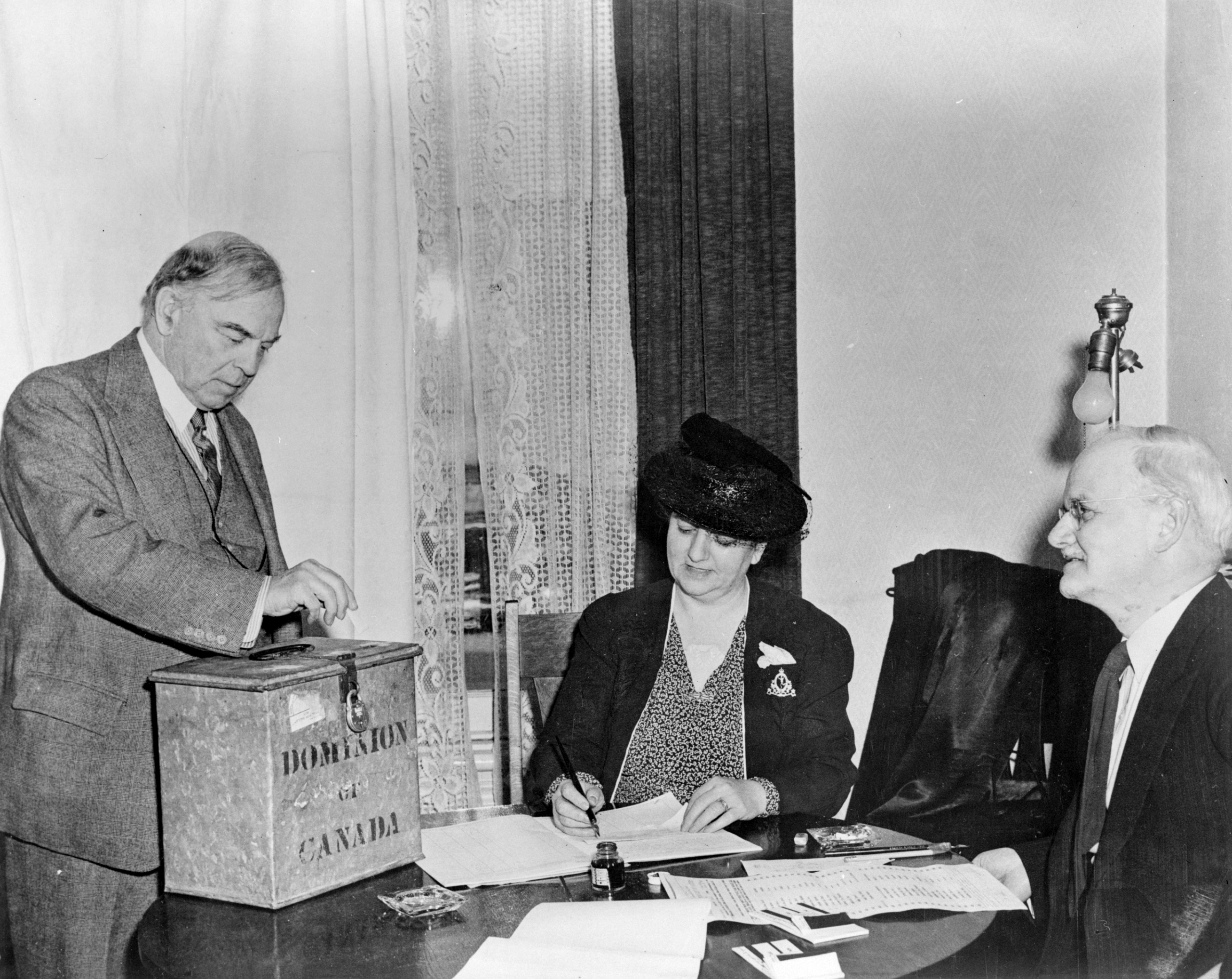
Canadian prime minister, Mackenzie King voting on a plebiscite to introduce conscription for overseas service in 1942

On the political side, Mackenzie King rejected any notion of a government of national unity. The 1940 federal election was held as normally scheduled, producing another majority for the Liberals. The Conscription Crisis of 1944 greatly affected unity between French and English-speaking Canadians, though was not as politically intrusive as that of the First World War.

During the war, Canada became more closely linked to the U.S. The Americans took virtual control of Yukon in order to build the Alaska Highway, and were a major presence in the British colony of Newfoundland with major airbases. After the start of the war with Japan in December 1941, the government, in cooperation with the U.S., began the Japanese-Canadian internment, which sent 22,000 British Columbia residents of Japanese descent to relocation camps far from the coast. The reason was intense public demand for removal and fears of espionage or sabotage. The government ignored reports from the RCMP and Canadian military that most of the Japanese were law-abiding and not a threat.

== Post-war era (1945–1960) ==
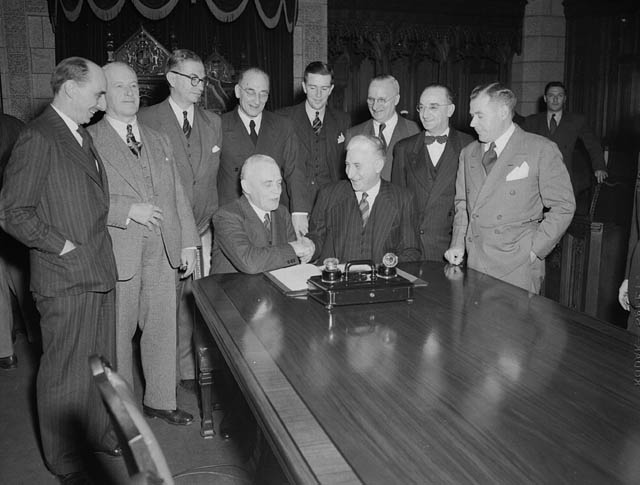
Prime Minister Louis St. Laurent shakes hands with Albert Walsh, after delegates from Canada and Newfoundland sign the agreement to admit the latter into Confederation

Prosperity returned to Canada during the Second World War and continued in the following years, with the development of universal health care, old-age pensions, and veterans' pensions. The financial crisis of the Great Depression had led the Dominion of Newfoundland to relinquish responsible government in 1934 and become a crown colony ruled by a British governor. In 1948, the British government gave voters three Newfoundland Referendum choices: remaining a crown colony, returning to Dominion status (that is, independence), or joining Canada. The British and Canadian governments collaborated to ensure that joining the United States was not an option. After bitter debate Newfoundlanders voted to join Canada in 1949 as a province.

The foreign policy of Canada during the Cold War was closely tied to that of the United States. Canada was a founding member of NATO (which Canada wanted to be a transatlantic economic and political union as well). In 1950, Canada sent combat troops to Korea during the Korean War as part of the United Nations forces. The federal government's desire to assert its territorial claims in the Arctic during the Cold War manifested with the High Arctic relocation, in which Inuit were moved from Nunavik (the northern third of Quebec) to barren Cornwallis Island; this project was later the subject of a long investigation by the Royal Commission on Aboriginal Peoples.

In 1956, the United Nations responded to the Suez Crisis by convening a United Nations Emergency Force to supervise the withdrawal of invading forces. The peacekeeping force was initially conceptualized by the Secretary of External Affairs and future Prime Minister Lester B. Pearson. Pearson was awarded the Nobel Peace Prize in 1957 for his work in establishing the peacekeeping operation.

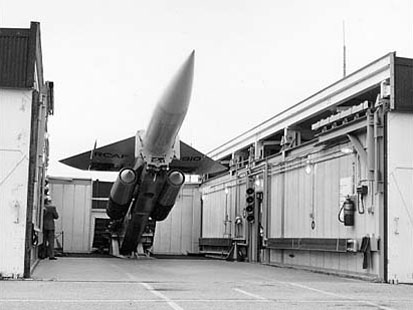
A Royal Canadian Air Force CIM-10 Bomarc missile. Acquired as an alternative to the defunct Avro Arrow program, its adoption garnered controversy given its nuclear payload.

Throughout the mid-1950s, prime ministers Louis St. Laurent and his successor John Diefenbaker attempted to create a new, highly advanced jet fighter, the Avro Arrow. The controversial aircraft was cancelled by Diefenbaker in 1959. Diefenbaker instead purchased the BOMARC missile defence system and American aircraft. In 1958 Canada established (with the United States) the North American Aerospace Defense Command (NORAD).

There were voices on both left and right that warned against being too close to the United States. Few Canadians listened before 1957. Instead, there was wide consensus on foreign and defence policies from 1948 to 1957. Bothwell, Drummond and English state:

That support was remarkably uniform geographically and racially, both coast to coast and among French and English. From the CCF on the left to the Social Credit on the right, the political parties agreed that NATO was a good thing, and communism a bad thing, that a close association with Europe was desirable, and that the Commonwealth embodied a glorious past.

However, the consensus did not last. By 1957 the Suez crisis alienated Canada from both Britain and France; politicians distrusted American leadership, businessmen questioned American financial investments; and intellectuals ridiculed the values of American television and Hollywood offerings that all Canadians watched. "Public support for Canada's foreign policy came unstuck. Foreign policy, from being a winning issue for the Liberals, was fast becoming a losing one."

In 1960, the Government under John Diefenbaker passed the Canadian Bill of Rights. While this only applied to the federal government, it provided the groundwork for what became the Canadian Charter of Rights and Freedoms that was added to the Constitution in 1982.

== 1960–1981 ==
In the 1960s, the Quiet Revolution took place in Quebec, overthrowing the old establishment which centred on the Roman Catholic Archdiocese of Quebec and led to modernizing of the economy and society. Québécois nationalists demanded independence, and tensions rose until violence erupted during the 1970 October Crisis. John Saywell says, "The two kidnappings and the murder of Pierre Laporte were the biggest domestic news stories in Canada's history." In 1976 the Parti Québécois was elected to power in Quebec, with a nationalist vision that included securing French linguistic rights in the province and the pursuit of some form of sovereignty for Quebec. This culminated in the 1980 referendum in Quebec on the question of sovereignty-association, which was turned down by 59% of the voters.

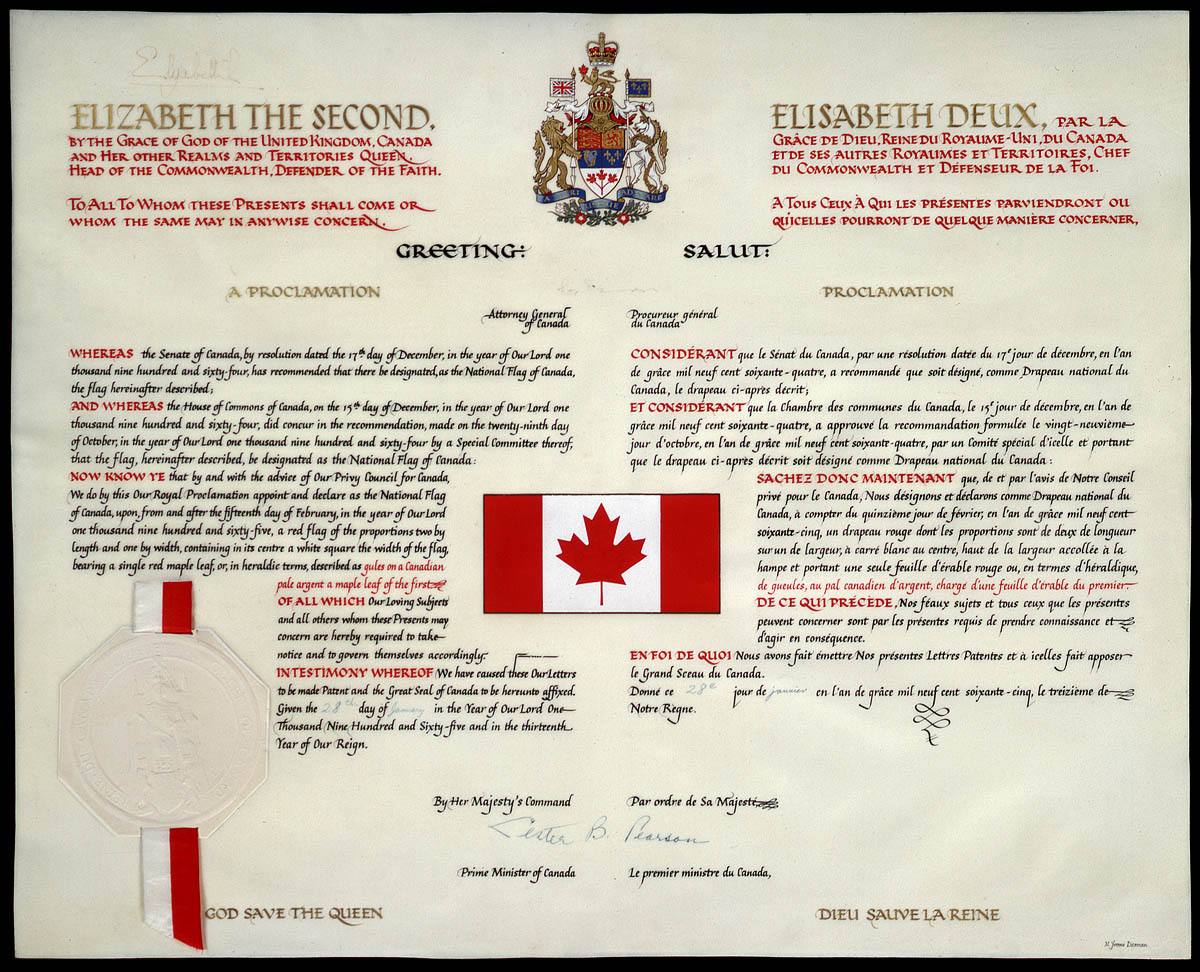
The proclamation for the national flag of Canada, issued in 1965.

In 1965, Canada adopted the maple leaf flag, although not without considerable debate and misgivings among large numbers of English Canadians. The World's Fair titled Expo 67 came to Montreal, coinciding with the Canadian Centennial that year. The fair opened on April 28, 1967, with the theme "Man and His World" and became the best attended of all BIE-sanctioned world expositions until that time.

Legislative restrictions on Canadian immigration that had favoured British and other European immigrants were amended in the 1960s, opening the doors to immigrants from all parts of the world. While the 1950s had seen high levels of immigration from Britain, Ireland, Italy, and northern continental Europe, by the 1970s immigrants increasingly came from India, China, Vietnam, Jamaica and Haiti. Immigrants of all backgrounds tended to settle in the major urban centres, particularly Toronto, Montreal and Vancouver.

During his long tenure in the office (1968–1979, 1980–1984), Prime Minister Pierre Trudeau made social and cultural change his political goals, including the pursuit of official bilingualism in Canada and plans for significant constitutional change. The west, particularly the petroleum-producing provinces like Alberta, opposed many of the policies emanating from central Canada, with the National Energy Program creating considerable antagonism and growing western alienation. Multiculturalism in Canada was adopted as the official policy of the Canadian government during the prime ministership of Pierre Trudeau.

== 1982–2000 ==
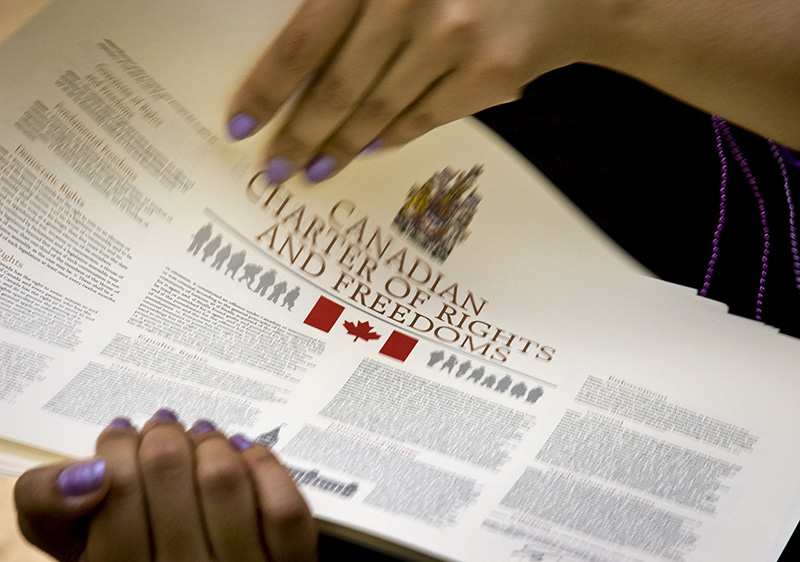
Printed copies of the Canadian Charter of Rights and Freedoms being handed out. The charter was enacted as a part of the Constitution Act, 1982.

In 1981, the Canadian House of Commons and Senate passed a resolution requesting that the British Parliament enact a package of constitutional amendments which would end the last powers of the British Parliament to legislate for Canada and would create an entirely Canadian process for constitutional amendments. The resolution set out the text of the proposed Canada Act, which also included the text of the Constitution Act, 1982. The British Parliament duly passed the Canada Act 1982, the Queen granting Royal Assent on March 29, 1982, 115 years to the day since Queen Victoria granted Royal Assent to the Constitution Act, 1867. On April 17, 1982, the Queen signed the Proclamation on the grounds of Parliament Hill in Ottawa bringing the Constitution Act, 1982 into force, thus patriating the Constitution of Canada.

Previously, the main portions of the constitution had existed only as an act passed of the British parliament, though under the constitutional convention recognized in the Balfour Declaration of 1926, it could not be altered without Canadian consent. Canada had established complete sovereignty as an independent country, with the Queen's role as monarch of Canada separate from her role as the British monarch or the monarch of any of the other Commonwealth realms.

In addition to the enactment of a constitutional amending formula, the Constitution Act, 1982 enacted the Canadian Charter of Rights and Freedoms. The Charter is a constitutionally entrenched bill of rights which applies to both the federal government and the provincial governments, unlike the earlier Canadian Bill of Rights. The patriation of the constitution was Trudeau's last major act as Prime Minister; he resigned in 1984.

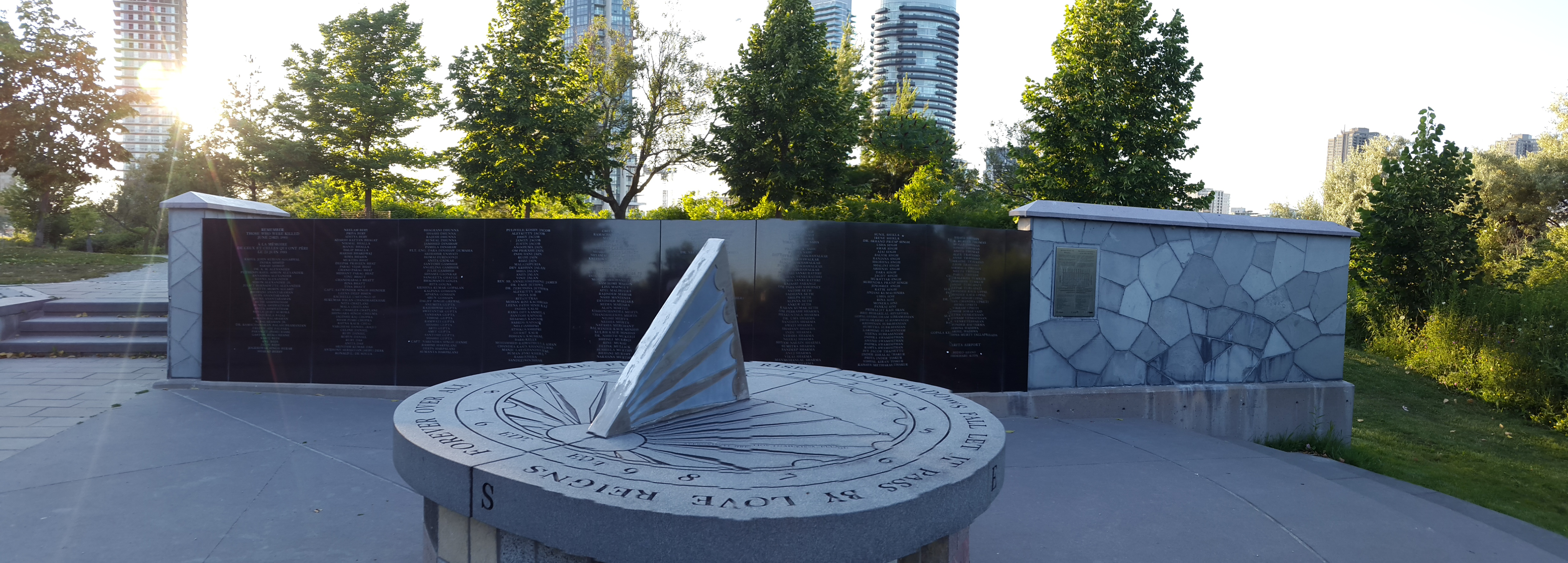
Memorial for Air India Flight 182 in Toronto. The bombing of Air India Flight 182 is the largest mass killing in Canadian history

On June 23, 1985, Air India Flight 182 was destroyed above the Atlantic Ocean by a bomb on board exploding; all 329 on board were killed, of whom 280 were Canadian citizens. The Air India attack is the largest mass murder in Canadian history.

The Progressive Conservative (PC) government of Brian Mulroney began efforts to gain Quebec's support for the Constitution Act, 1982 and end western alienation. In 1987, the Meech Lake Accord talks began between the provincial and federal governments, seeking constitutional changes favourable to Quebec. The failure of the Meech Lake Accord resulted in the formation of a separatist party, Bloc Québécois. The constitutional reform process under Prime Minister Mulroney culminated in the failure of the Charlottetown Accord which would have recognized Quebec as a "distinct society" but was rejected in 1992 by a narrow margin.

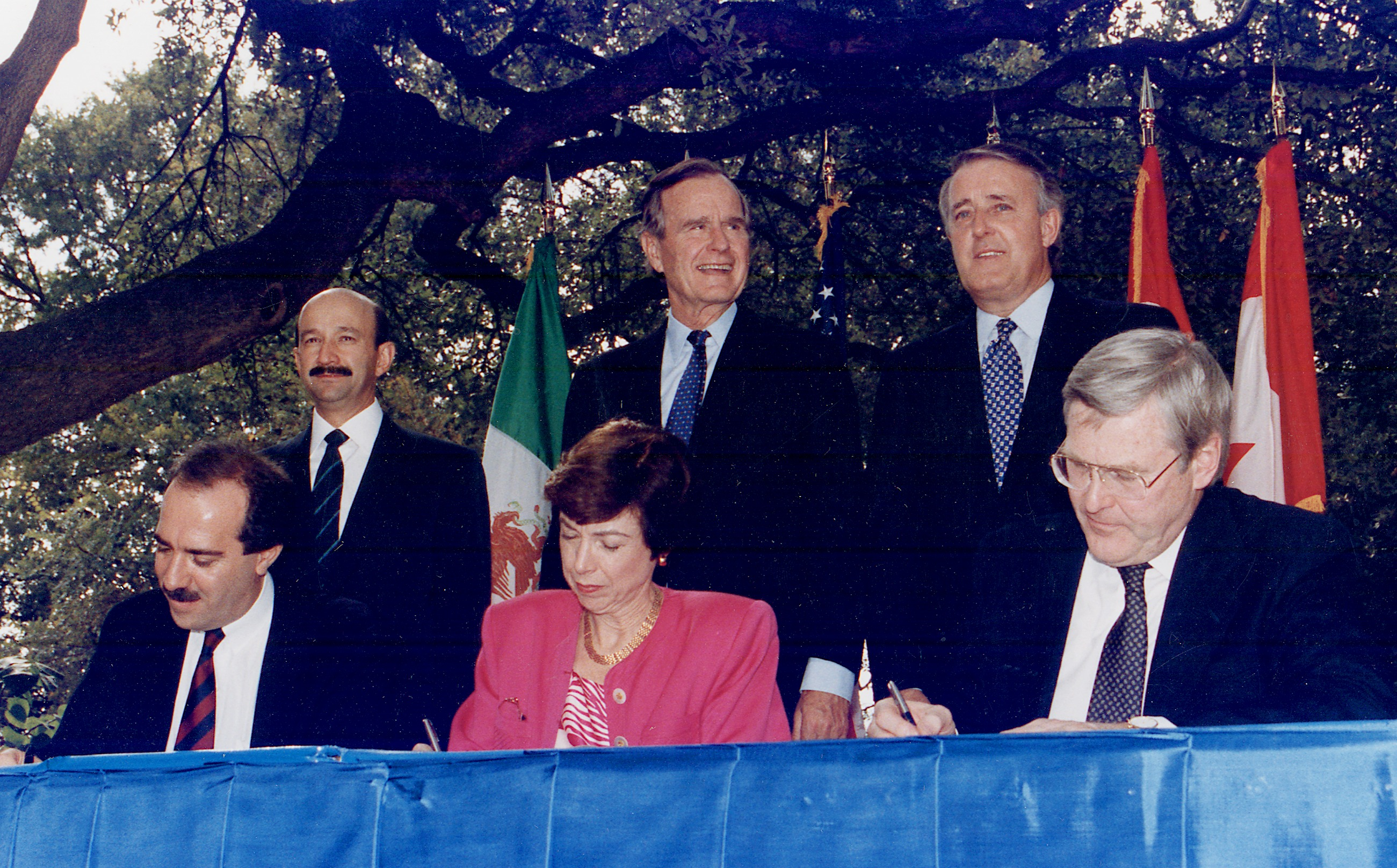
Mexican President Carlos Salinas, U.S. President George H. W. Bush, and Canadian Prime Minister Brian Mulroney standing during the initial signing ceremony for the North American Free Trade Agreement in 1992

Under Brian Mulroney, relations with the United States began to grow more closely integrated. In 1986, Canada and the U.S. signed the "Acid Rain Treaty" to reduce acid rain. In 1989, the federal government adopted the Canada–United States Free Trade Agreement (Agreement) with the United States despite significant animosity from the Canadian public who were concerned about the economic and cultural impacts of close integration with the United States. The Agreement would later be replaced with the North American Free Trade Agreement (NAFTA) and its side agreement, the North American Agreement on Environmental Cooperation in 1994.

On July 11, 1990, the Oka Crisis land dispute began between the Mohawk people of Kanesatake and the adjoining town of Oka, Quebec. The dispute was the first of a number of well-publicized conflicts between First Nations and the Canadian government in the late 20th century. In August 1990, Canada was one of the first nations to condemn Iraq's invasion of Kuwait, and it quickly agreed to join the U.S.-led coalition. Canada deployed destroyers and later a CF-18 Hornet squadron with support personnel, as well as a field hospital to deal with casualties.

Following Mulroney's resignation as prime minister in 1993, Kim Campbell took office and became Canada's first female prime minister. Campbell remained in office for only a few months: the 1993 election saw the collapse of the Progressive Conservative Party from government to two seats, while the Bloc Québécois became the official opposition. Prime Minister Jean Chrétien of the Liberals took office in November 1993 with a majority government and was re-elected with further majorities during the 1997 and 2000 elections.

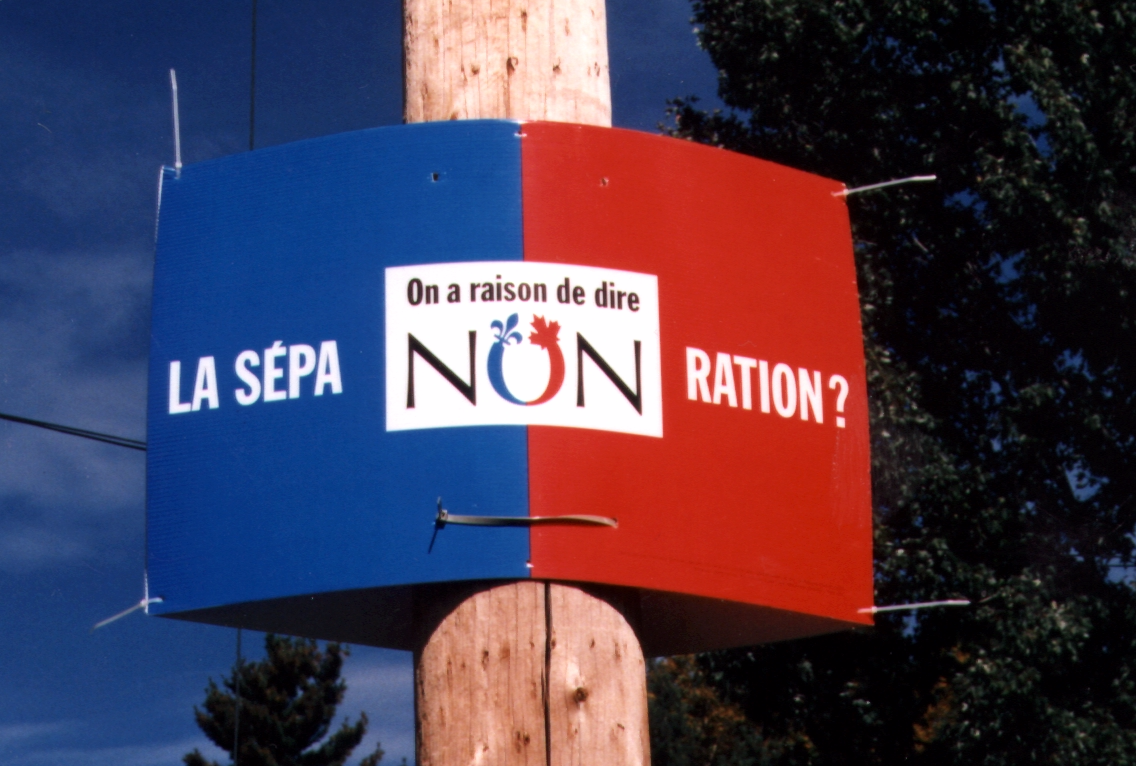
"No" side

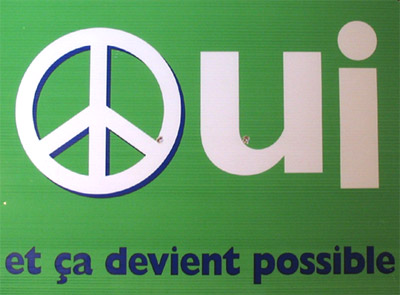
"Yes" side

Campaign signs for both sides of the 1995 Quebec sovereignty referendum

In 1995, the government of Quebec held a second referendum on sovereignty that was rejected by a margin of 50.6% to 49.4%. In 1998, the Canadian Supreme Court ruled unilateral secession by a province to be unconstitutional, and Parliament passed the Clarity Act outlining the terms of a negotiated departure.

== 2001–present ==
Environmental issues increased in importance in Canada during the late 1990s, resulting in the signing of the Kyoto Accord on climate change by Canada's Liberal government in 2002. The accord was in 2007 nullified by Prime Minister Stephen Harper's Conservative government, which proposed a "made-in-Canada" solution to climate change.

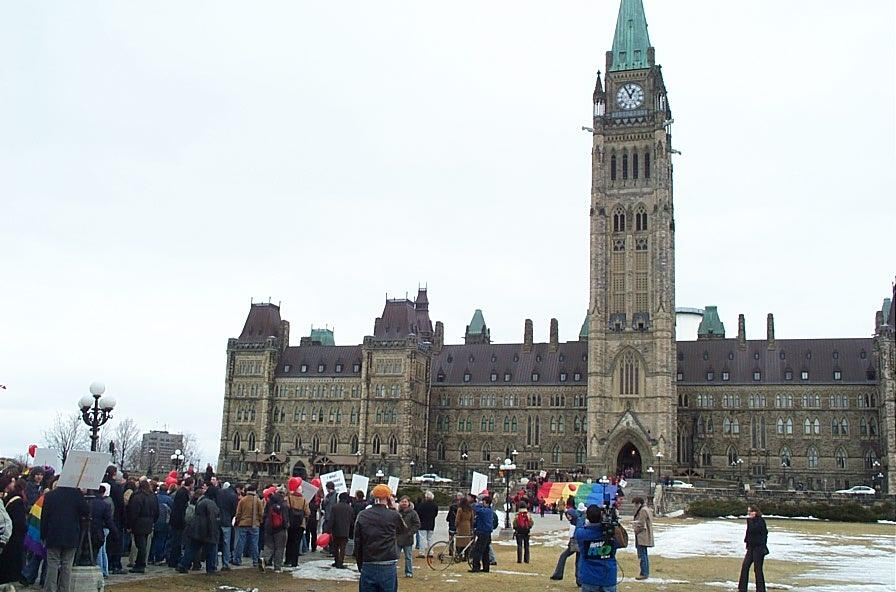
The March of Hearts rally in support of same-sex marriage at Parliament Hill in 2004. Same-sex marriage was legalized in 2005 with the passage of the Civil Marriage Act.

Canada became the fourth country in the world and the first country in the Americas to legalize same-sex marriage nationwide with the enactment of the Civil Marriage Act in 2005. Court decisions, starting in 2003, had already legalized same-sex marriage in eight out of ten provinces and one of three territories. Before the passage of the act, more than 3,000 same-sex couples had married in these areas.

The Canadian Alliance and PC Party merged into the Conservative Party of Canada in 2003, ending a 13-year division of the conservative vote. The party was elected twice as a minority government under the leadership of Stephen Harper in the 2006 federal election and 2008 federal election. Harper's Conservative Party won a majority in the 2011 federal election with the New Democratic Party under Jack Layton forming the Official Opposition for the first time. In 2006, Parliament passed the Québécois nation motion.

Under Harper, Canada and the United States continued to integrate state and provincial agencies to strengthen security along the Canada–United States border through the Western Hemisphere Travel Initiative. From 2002 to 2011, Canada was involved in the Afghanistan War as part of the U.S. stabilization force and the NATO-commanded International Security Assistance Force. In July 2010, the largest purchase in Canadian military history, totalling $9 billion for the acquisition of 65 F-35 fighters, was announced by the federal government. Canada is one of several nations that assisted in the development of the F-35 and has invested over $168 million in the program.

Map with areas labelled where the Truth and Reconciliation Commission held outreach and statement-gathering events over the impact of residential schools with the indigenous peoples

In 2008, the Government of Canada formally apologized to the indigenous peoples of Canada for the residential school system and the damage it caused. The government set up the Truth and Reconciliation Commission of Canada that year to document the damage caused by the residential school system and the reconciliation needed to proceed into the future. It provided a "call to action" report in 2015.

On 19 October 2015, Stephen Harper's Conservatives' were defeated by a newly resurgent Liberal party under the leadership of Justin Trudeau, which had been reduced to third-party status in the 2011 election. His government signed the United States–Mexico–Canada Agreement, implemented $10-a-day childcare, signed a confidence and supply agreement with the NDP, and passed a motion declaring the Indigenous residential school system as genocide following the discovery of gravesites. It also faced controversies, including the SNC-Lavalin affair and the WE Charity scandal. Trudeau's Liberals' were re-elected in the 2019 and 2021 federal elections with minority governments.

Multiculturalism has been emphasized in recent decades, with the country having the eighth-largest immigrant population in the world.

In 2013, the consumption of cannabis for medical reasons was legalized. In October 2018, the Canadian government under Justin Trudeau passed the Cannabis Act, legalizing the recreational use and sale of cannabis. Under the new law, Canadians could consume cannabis and cannabis products in public, grow limited numbers of plants themselves (subject to provincial regulation), pardons for simple possession convictions were promised, while drivers could not have any traces of THC in their blood.

From January 2020 to May 2022, Canada was greatly impacted by the COVID-19 pandemic, which caused over 40,000 deaths in the country, the third highest mortality toll in North America (behind the United States and Mexico). Trudeau's government announced a ban on "assault-style" weapons after the 2020 Nova Scotia attacks, which resulted in the deaths of 22 victims. Amid the Canada convoy protest in early 2022, Trudeau's government invoked the Emergencies Act for the first time.

Mark Carney, the current prime minister of Canada

Following the 2024–2025 Canadian political crisis, Trudeau resigned and was succeeded by former Bank of Canada governor Mark Carney as both Liberal leader and prime minister. The ensuing federal election was dominated by U.S. president Donald Trump's threats to annex Canada and announcement of tariffs against the country. Carney's Liberals won the election and were re-elected to a fourth consecutive term.

== Historiography ==
The Conquest of New France has always been a central and contested theme of Canadian memory. Cornelius Jaenen argues:

The Conquest has remained a difficult subject for French-Canadian historians because it can be viewed either as economically and ideologically disastrous or as a providential intervention to enable Canadians to maintain their language and religion under British rule. For virtually all Anglophone historians it was a victory for British military, political, and economic superiority which would eventually only benefit the conquered.

Historians of the 1950s tried to explain the economic inferiority of the French Canadians by arguing that the Conquest:

destroyed an integral society and decapitated the commercial class; leadership of the conquered people fell to the Church; and, because commercial activity came to be monopolized by British merchants, national survival concentrated on agriculture.

At the other pole, are those Francophone historians who see the positive benefit of enabling the preservation of language, religion, and traditional customs under British rule. French-Canadian debates have escalated since the 1960s, as the Conquest is seen as a pivotal moment in the history of Quebec's nationalism. Historian Jocelyn Létourneau suggested in the 21st century, "1759 does not belong primarily to a past that we might wish to study and understand, but, rather, to a present and a future that we might wish to shape and control."

Anglophone historians, on the other hand, portray the Conquest as a victory for British military, political and economic superiority that was a permanent benefit to the French.

Allan Greer argues that Whig history was once the dominant style of scholars. He says the:

interpretive schemes that dominated Canadian historical writing through the middle decades of the twentieth century were built on the assumption that history had a discernible direction and flow. Canada was moving towards a goal in the nineteenth century; whether this endpoint was the construction of a transcontinental, commercial, and political union, the development of parliamentary government, or the preservation and resurrection of French Canada, it was certainly a Good Thing. Thus the rebels of 1837 were quite literally on the wrong track. They lost because they had to lose; they were not simply overwhelmed by superior force, they were justly chastised by the God of History.

== See also ==
- List of Canadian historians
- Canadian studies

National historic significance

- Events of National Historic Significance
- National Historic Sites of Canada
- Persons of National Historic Significance

History by topic

History by province or territory
- Constitutional history of Canada
- Economic history of Canada
  - History of rail transport in Canada
  - Poverty in Canada
- History of Canadian newspapers
- History of Canadian sports
- History of cities in Canada
- History of education in Canada
- History of medicine in Canada
- Social history of Canada
- Liberalism in Canada
- Conservatism in Canada
- Social conservatism in Canada
- Populism in Canada

Academia

- Canadian Journal of History
- Canadian Historical Review
- Journal of Canadian Studies;:Media
- Heritage Minutes
- History Trek, Canadian History web portal designed for children
