= History Trek =

History Trek: A Canadian History Site is a bilingual (French and English) web portal made for children, containing reliable sources about Canadian history. It was developed by researchers at McGill University with the help of students who ranged from 9 to 12 years of age. This is an example of an intergenerational design team, directly involving a sample of their user population within their team. As such, History Trek was designed "by children for children".

The History Trek project has been completed, and the website has been preserved in the Wayback Machine Internet Archive.

History Trek website (archived)

== Development ==
The development of History Trek was funded by the Social Sciences and Humanities Research Council of Canada and took place between 2002 and 2007. The intergenerational design team, called the "Web Wonders", consisted of McGill researchers and a sample of student users. This design "team was led by Andrew Large and Jamshid Beheshti" whose primary goal was to make an informational portal website that children would both want to use and know how to use. Potential users were included in the History Trek development process to determine the visual design, use of terminology, and methods of information retrieval.

== Methods of information retrieval ==
Based on the research done during development, and in order to support both information retrieval and browsing, History Trek incorporated four methods to retrieve information:

- Keyword search
- Advanced search
- Topic search
- Alphabetical search (Note: Research conducted after History Trek was implemented indicated that the Topic Search (42%) and Alphabetical Search (41%) were the most popular, followed by the Keyword Search (15%) and Advanced Search (3%).)

== See also ==
- Heritage Minutes

== Bibliography ==
- Beheshti, J., Large, A., & Tam, M. (2010). "Search patterns on a children’s portal." Canadian Association for Information Science Conference Proceedings. Retrieved April 11, 2013.
- Beheshti, J., Large, A., & Tam, M. (2010). "Transaction logs and search patterns on a children's portal / Journaux de transaction et modes de recherche sur un portail web destiné aux enfants." Canadian Journal of Information and Library Science, 34(4). 391-402. University of Toronto Press. Retrieved April 11, 2013, from Project MUSE database.
- Beheshti, J., & Large, A. (2012). The information behavior of a new generation: Children and teens in the 21st century. Scarecrow Press.
- Large, A., & Beheshti, J. (2007). History Trek: A Canadian history. Retrieved April 11, 2013.
- Large, A., Beheshti, J., Nesset, V., & Bowler, L. (2005). "Web portal characteristics: Children as Designers and Evaluaters." Canadian Association for Information Science Conference Proceedings. Retrieved April 11, 2013.
- Large, A., Beheshti, J., Nesset, V., & Bowler, L. (2006). "Web portal design guidelines as identified by children through the processes of design and evaluation." 69th Annual Meeting of the American Society for Information Science and Technology (ASIST). Retrieved April 11, 2013.
