= Name of Canada =

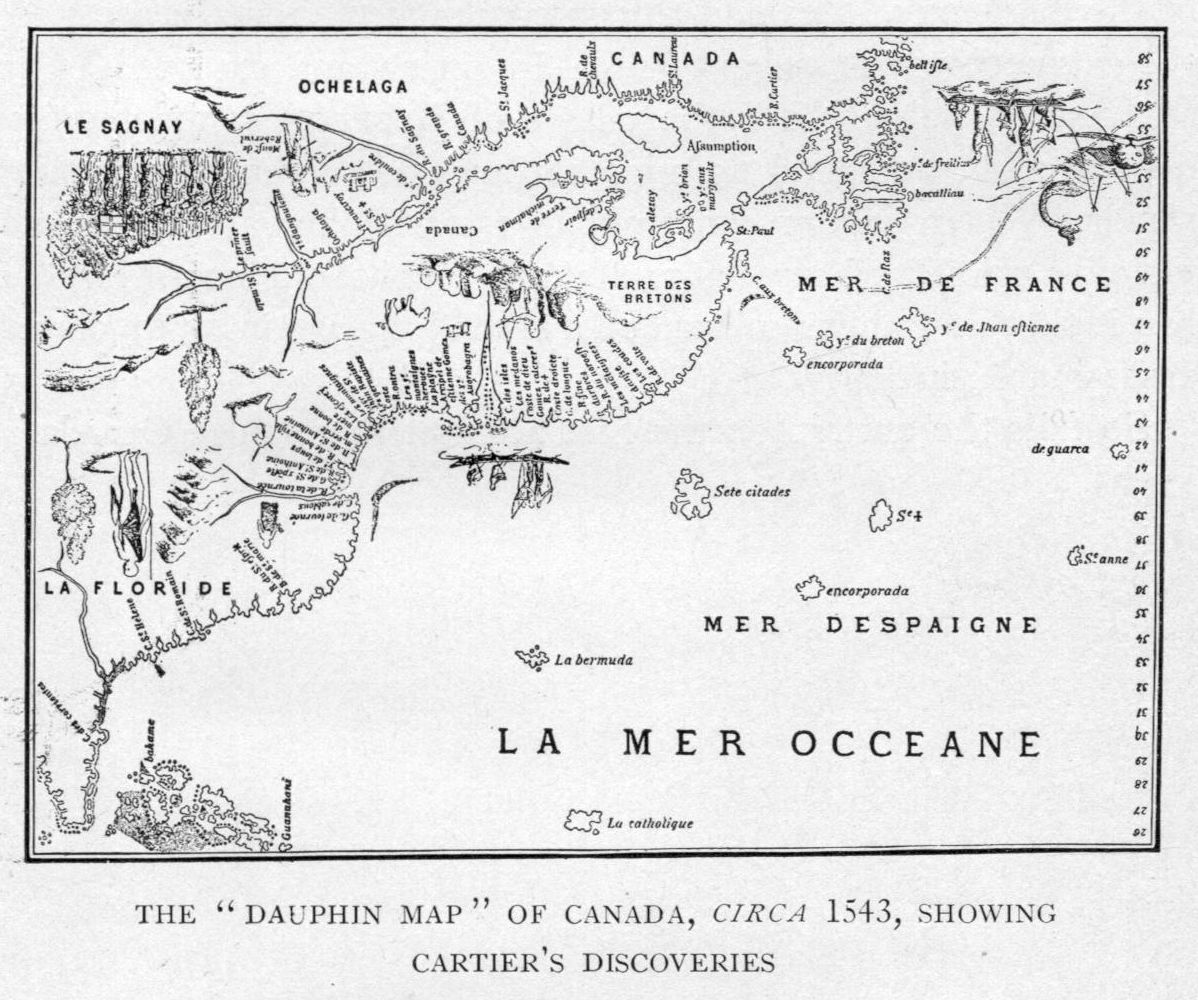
The Dauphin Map of Canada, c. 1543, showing the areas Cartier visited. Newfoundland is near the upper right; Florida and the Bahamas are at lower left

While a variety of theories have been postulated for the name of Canada, its origin is now accepted as coming from the Laurentian language word kanata, meaning 'village' or 'settlement'. In 1535, indigenous inhabitants of the present-day Quebec City region used the word to direct French explorer Jacques Cartier to the village of Stadacona. Cartier later used the word Canada to refer not only to that particular village but to the entire area subject to Donnacona (the chief at Stadacona); by 1545, European books and maps had begun referring to this small region along the Saint Lawrence River as Canada.

From the 16th to the early 18th century, Canada referred to the part of New France that lay along the Saint Lawrence River. In 1791, the area became two British colonies called Upper Canada and Lower Canada. These two colonies were collectively named the Canadas until their union as the British Province of Canada in 1841.

Upon Confederation in 1867, Canada was adopted as the legal name for the new country at the London Conference, and the word Dominion was conferred as the country's title. The federal government of Louis St. Laurent ended the practice of using Dominion in the statutes of Canada in 1951. By the 1950s, the term Dominion of Canada was no longer used by the United Kingdom, which considered Canada a "Realm of the Commonwealth".

The Canada Act 1982, which brought the constitution of Canada fully under Canadian control, referred only to Canada. Later that year, the name of the national holiday was changed from Dominion Day to Canada Day. The term Dominion was used to distinguish the federal government from the provincial ones, though after the Second World War the term federal had replaced dominion.

== Etymology ==
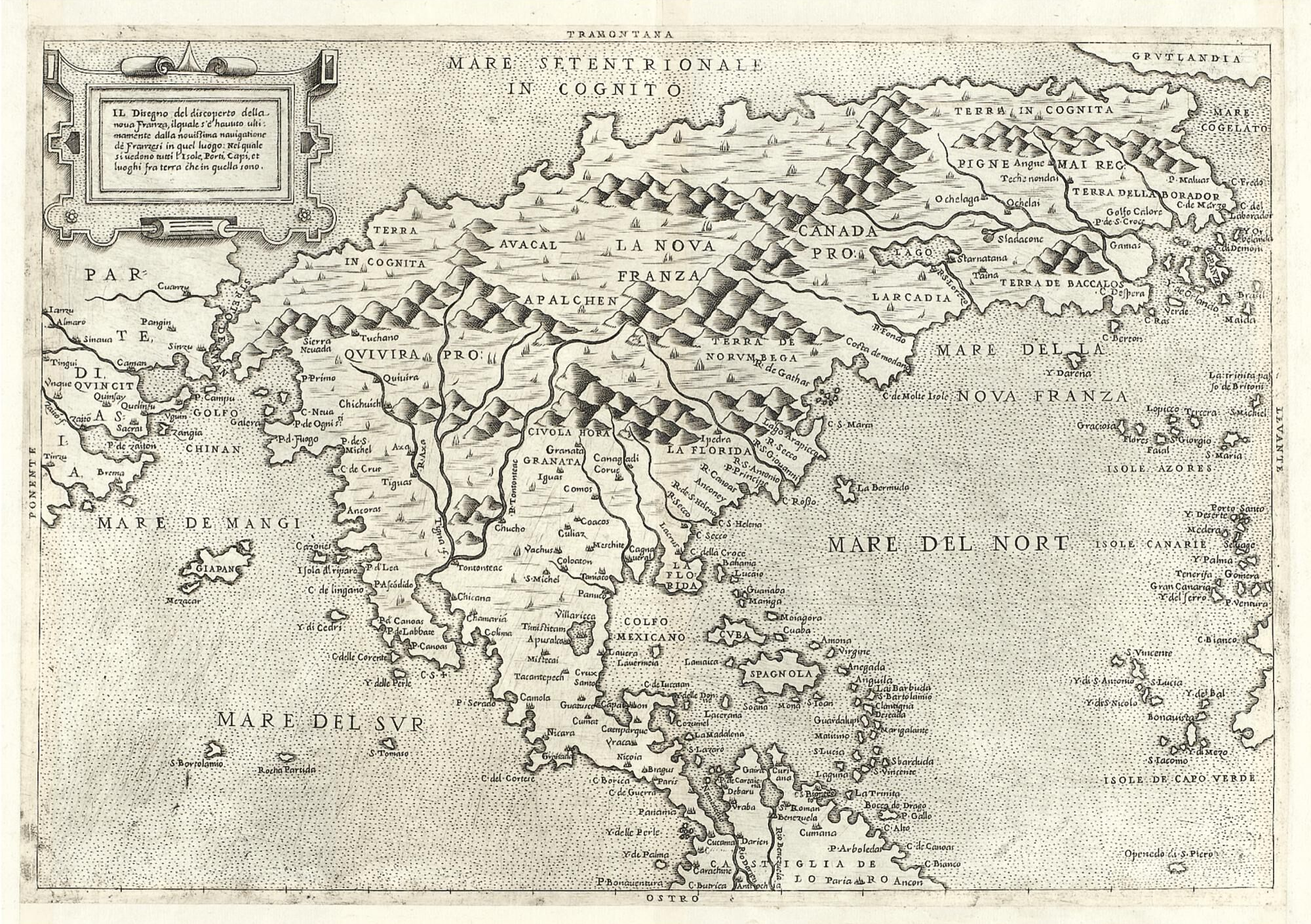
A map of North America from 1565, one of the first to include the name "Canada" (top right).

The name Canada is now generally accepted as originating from the St. Lawrence Iroquoian word kanata ([kana:taʔ]), meaning 'village' or 'settlement'. Related translations include 'land' or 'town', with subsequent terminologies meaning 'cluster of dwellings' or 'collection of huts'. This explanation is historically documented in Jacques Cartier's Bref récit et succincte narration de la navigation faite en MDXXXV et MDXXXVI.

Although the Laurentian language, which was spoken by the inhabitants of St. Lawrence Valley settlements such as Stadacona (modern-day Quebec City) and Hochelaga (modern-day Montreal) in the 16th century, is now extinct, it was closely related to other dialects of the Iroquoian languages, such as the Oneida and Mohawk languages. Related cognates meaning 'town' include nekantaa, ganataje, and kanataye in the Mohawk, Onondaga, and Seneca languages respectively. Prior to archaeological confirmation that the St. Lawrence Iroquois were a separate people from the Mohawk, most sources specifically linked the name's origin to the Mohawk word instead of the Laurentian one.

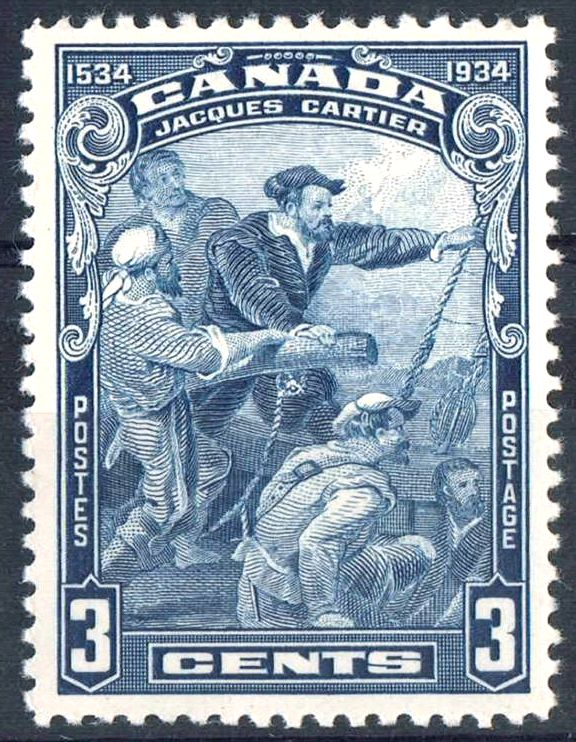
A 1934 three-cent stamp commemorated the four-hundredth anniversary of the discovery of Canada by the French navigator, Jacques Cartier.

A widespread perception in Canadian folklore is that Cartier misunderstood the term "Canada" as the existing proper name of the Iroquois people's entire territory rather than the generic class noun for a town or village. For instance, the Historica Canada's Heritage Minute episode devoted to Cartier's landing at Hochelaga is scripted as having Cartier believe that "Kanata" or "Canada" was the established name of the entire country. This is not supported by Cartier's own writings, however—in Bref récit, Cartier fully understands the actual meaning of the word ("They call a town Canada").

While the Saint-Lawrence Iroquoian origin for the name Canada is now widely accepted, other theories have been put forth in the past.

=== Iberian origin theory ===
The most common alternative theory suggested that the name originated when Portuguese or Spanish explorers, having explored the northern part of the continent and unable to find gold and silver, wrote cá nada ('nothing here' in Portuguese), acá nada, aqui nada or el cabo de nada ('Cape Nothing' in Spanish) on that part of their maps. An alternative explanation favoured by philologist Marshall Elliott linked the name to the Spanish word cañada, meaning 'glen' or 'valley'.

The earliest iterations of the Spanish "nothing here" theory stated that the explorers made the declaration upon visiting the Bay of Chaleur, while later versions left out any identifying geographic detail.

The known Portuguese presence in modern Canadian territory, meanwhile, was in Newfoundland and Labrador. Neither region is located anywhere near Iroquoian territory, and the name Canada does not appear on any Spanish or Portuguese maps of the North American coast that predate Cartier's visit. No name for the Bay of Chaleur is attested at all in Spanish sources from that period, while the only name for Newfoundland attested in Portuguese sources is Terra Nova do Bacalhau ('New Land of Cod'), after the region's plentiful cod.

In most versions of the Iberian origin theory, the Spanish or Portuguese passed their name on to the Iroquois, who rapidly adopted it in place of their own prior word for a village; however, no historical evidence for any such Iberian-Iroquoian interaction has ever actually been found. Elliott's "valley" theory, conversely, was that the Spanish gave their name for the area directly to Jacques Cartier, who then entirely ignored or passed over the virtually identical Iroquoian word. According to Elliott, Cartier never explicitly stated that there was a direct connection between canada or kanata as the Iroquoian word for 'village' and Canada as the new name of the entire territory, and never accounted for the spelling difference between kanata and Canada—and thus the Spanish etymology had to be favoured because the spellings matched. Notably, Cartier never wrote of having any awareness of any preexisting Spanish or Portuguese name for the region either, meaning that Elliott's allegation that the kanata derivation was not adequately supported by Cartier's own writing on the matter was also true of his own preferred theory.

Franciscan priest André Thevet claimed that the word derived from segnada Canada, an answer reportedly given by Spaniards in the St. Lawrence Valley area when asked what their purpose was; according to Thevet, the phrase meant that they were seeking land or that they were hunting. These words do not actually exist in Spanish, however.

=== Minor or humorous theories ===
British philologist B. Davies surmised that by the same process which initially saw the First Nations mislabelled as Indians, the country came to be named for the Carnata region of India or that region's Kannada ethnic group; however, this theory has attracted no significant support from other academics.

In Seneca the word kha:na:ta means "follow (me) closely". The theory is that as Jacques Cartier was being directed to the village the inhabitants instructed him to follow them.

Additional theories have attributed the name Canada to: a word in an unspecified indigenous language for 'mouth of the country' in reference to the Gulf of St. Lawrence; a Cree word for 'neat or clean'; a claimed Innu war cry of "kan-na-dun, Kunatun"; a shared Cree and Innu word, p'konata, which purportedly meant 'without a plan' or 'I don't know'; a short-lived French colony purportedly established by a settler whose surname was Cane; Cartier's description elsewhere in his writings of Labrador as "the land God gave to Cain;" or, to a claim that the early French habitants demanded a "can a day" of spruce beer from the local intendant (a claim easily debunked by the fact that the habitants would have been speaking French, not English).

In their 1983 book The Anglo Guide to Survival in Québec, humourists Josh Freed and Jon Kalina tied the Iberian origin theory to the phrase nada mas caca ('nothing but shit'). No historian or linguist has ever analyzed this explanation as anything more than an obvious joke.

== Canadian ==
The demonym "Canadien" or "Canadian" once referred exclusively to the indigenous groups who were native to the territory, traced back to 1664. Its use was extended over time to the French settlers of New France by 1746, and later the English settlers of Upper Canada by 1792. During the Quiet Revolution in the 1960s and 1970s, Francophones in Quebec shifted their primary identity from Canadien to Québécois, leaving the term Canadien/Canadian to represent national rather than distinct ethnic identity.

== Colonial usage ==
=== New France ===
Cartier transcribed the Saint-Lawrence Iroquoian word (pronounced [kanata]) as "Canada" and was the first European to use the word to refer not only to the village of Stadacona but also to the neighbouring region and to the Saint Lawrence River, which he called rivière de Canada during his second voyage in 1535. By the mid-1500s, European books and maps began referring to this region as Canada.

Canada soon after became the name of a colony in New France that stretched along the St. Lawrence River. The terms "Canada" and "New France" were often used interchangeably during the colonial period.

=== British North America ===
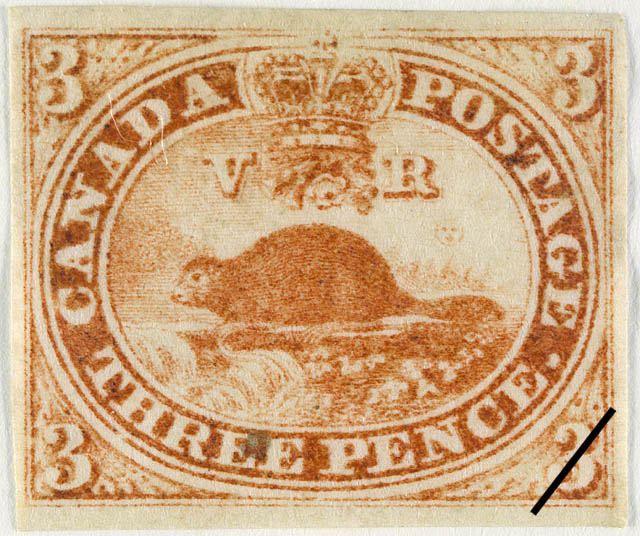
An 1851 Province of Canada postage stamp, the 3 pence beaver ("Threepenny Beaver")

After the British conquest of New France (including ceding of the French colony, Canada) in 1763, the colony was renamed the Province of Quebec. Following the American Revolution and the influx of United Empire Loyalists into Quebec, the colony was split on December 26, 1791, into Upper Canada and Lower Canada, sometime being collectively known as "the Canadas", the first time that the name "Canada" was used officially in the British regime.

Some reports from the 1840s suggest that in that era, the word "Canada" was commonly pronounced "Kaugh-na-daugh" rather than its more contemporary pronunciation.

Upper Canada and Lower Canada were merged into one colony, the Province of Canada, in 1841, based on the recommendations of the Durham Report. The former colonies were then known as Canada East and Canada West, and a single legislature was established with equal representation from each. Underpopulated Canada West opposed demands by Canada East for representation by population, but the roles reversed as Canada West's population surpassed that of Canada East. The single colony remained governed in this way until July 1, 1867, often with coalition governments. A new capital city was built at Ottawa, chosen in 1857 by Queen Victoria, and confirmed by the Parliament of the Province of Canada in 1859 and 1860. Ottawa became the seat of government for the Province of Canada in 1866, and then for Canada in 1867.

== Selection of the name Canada ==
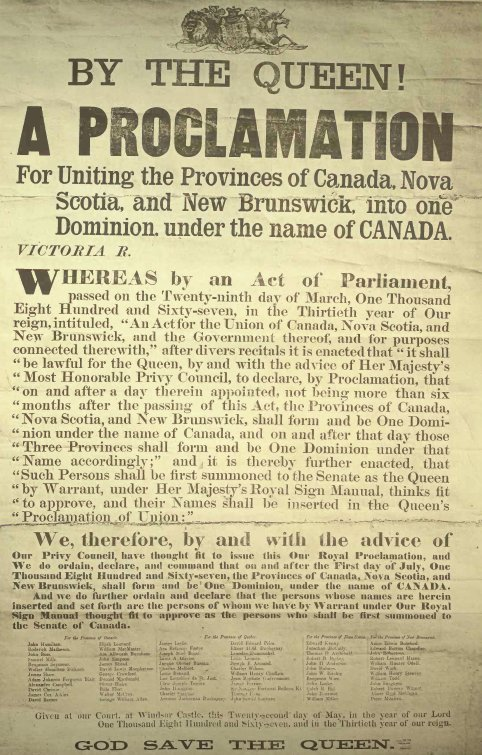
Proclamation announcing the formation of one Dominion, under the name of CANADA, 1867

At the conferences held in London to determine the form of confederation that would unite the Province of Canada (now Ontario and Quebec), the province of New Brunswick, and the province of Nova Scotia, a delegate from either Nova Scotia or New Brunswick proposed the name Canada in February 1867, and it was unanimously accepted by the other delegates. There appears to have been little discussion, though other names were suggested.

=== Other proposed names ===
While the provinces' delegates spent little time, if any, in settling on Canada as the name for the new country, others proposed a variety of other names:

- Anglia – the medieval Latin name for England
- Albionoria – 'Albion of the north'
- Borealia – from borealis, the Latin word for 'northern'; compare with Australia
- Cabotia – in honour of Italian explorer John Cabot, who explored the eastern coast of Canada for England
- Colonia – 'Colony'
- Efisga – an acronym of English, French, Irish, Scottish, German, American. (Some accounts state that the a stood for Aboriginal, but there was little or no use of that term to describe Indigenous peoples in Canada at the time.)
- Hochelaga – an old name for Montreal
- Laurentia
- Mesopelagia – 'land between the seas'
- New Albion
- Norland
- Superior
- Tupona – acronym for The United Provinces of North America
- Transatlantica
- Ursalia – 'place of bears'
- Vesperia – 'land of the evening star'
- Victorialand – in honour of Queen Victoria

Walter Bagehot of The Economist newspaper in London argued that the new nation should be called Northland or Anglia instead of Canada. On these names, the statesman Thomas D'Arcy McGee commented, "Now I would ask any honourable member of the House how he would feel if he woke up some fine morning and found himself, instead of a Canadian, a Tuponian or a Hochelegander?".

== Kingdom and Dominion ==
Working towards Confederation, Canada's founders deliberated on the official title for their new country, primarily between the "Kingdom of Canada" or the "Dominion of Canada".

In J. S. Ewart's two volume work, The Kingdom Papers, it is noted that the following names were considered for the union of British North America: "The United Colony of Canada", "the United Provinces of Canada", and "the Federated Provinces of Canada". Ewart was also an ardent advocate for the formation of "the Republic of Canada", a position which was rarely expressed in those times.

=== Kingdom of Canada ===
During the Charlottetown Conference of 1864, John A. Macdonald, who later became the first Prime Minister of Canada, talked of "founding a great British monarchy," in connection with the British Empire. He advocated, in the fourth Canadian draft of the British North America Act (BNA Act), the name "Kingdom of Canada", in the text is said:

The word 'Parliament' shall mean the Legislature or Parliament of the Kingdom of Canada.
The word 'Kingdom' shall mean and comprehend the United Provinces of Ontario, Quebec, Nova Scotia, and New Brunswick.

The words 'Privy Council' shall mean such persons as may from time to time be appointed, by the Governor General, and sworn to aid and advise in the Government of the Kingdom.

Canada's founders, led by Macdonald, wished their new nation to be called the Kingdom of Canada in order to "fix the monarchical basis of the constitution". The governor general at the time, The 4th Viscount Monck, supported the move to designate Canada a kingdom; however, officials at the Colonial Office in London opposed this potentially "premature" and "pretentious" reference for a new country. They were also wary of antagonizing the United States, which had emerged from its Civil War as a formidable military power with unsettled grievances because British interests had sold ships to the Confederacy despite a blockade, and thus opposed the use of terms such as kingdom or empire to describe the new country.

=== Adoption of Dominion ===
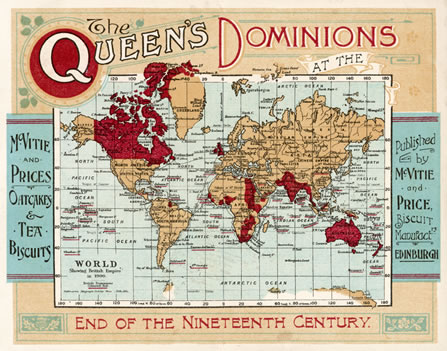
Map of the British Empire under Queen Victoria at the end of the nineteenth century. "Dominions" refers to all territories belonging to the Crown.

Sir Samuel Leonard Tilley, Premier of New Brunswick, suggested the term Dominion, (Note: "Dominion (noun)." Merriam-Webster Dictionary: "a self-governing nation of the Commonwealth of Nations other than the United Kingdom that acknowledges the British monarch as chief of state") inspired by Psalm 72:8 (from the King James Bible): "He shall have dominion also from sea to sea, and from the river unto the ends of the earth." This is also echoed in Canada's motto: 'A Mari Usque Ad Mare (Latin for 'from sea to sea').

The term Dominion had been used for centuries to refer to the lands held by a monarch, and had previously been adopted as titles for the Dominion of New England and the Dominion and Colony of Virginia. It continued to apply as a generic term for the major colonial possessions of the British Empire until well into the 20th century; although Tilley and the other Fathers of Confederation broadened the meaning of the word dominion to a "virtual synonym for sovereign state". Its adoption as a title for Canada in 1867 served the purpose of upholding the monarchist principle in Canada; in a letter to Queen Victoria, Lord Carnarvon stated:

The North American delegates are anxious that the United Provinces should be designated as the 'Dominion of Canada.' It is a new title, but intended on their part as a tribute to the Monarchical principle which they earnestly desire to uphold.

Macdonald, however, bemoaned its adoption. In a letter to Lord Knutsford on the topic of the loss of the use of the word kingdom, Macdonald said:

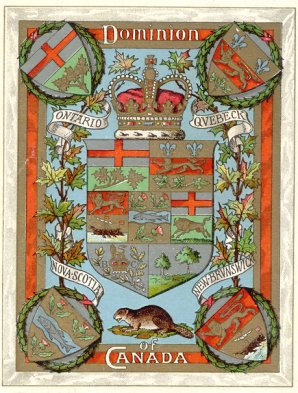
Canadian post card from 1905.

A great opportunity was lost in 1867 when the Dominion was formed out of the several provinces…The declaration of all the B.N.A. provinces that they desired as one dominion to remain a portion of the Empire, showed what wise government and generous treatment would do, and should have been marked as an epoch in the history of England. This would probably have been the case had Lord Carnarvon, who, as colonial minister, had sat at the cradle of the new country, remained in office. His ill-omened resignation was followed by the appointment of the late Duke of Buckingham, who had as his adviser the then Governor General, Lord Monck - both good men, certainly, but quite unable, from the constitution of their minds, to rise to the occasion. Had a different course been pursued, for instance, had united Canada been declared to be an auxiliary kingdom, as it was in the Canadian draft of the bill, I feel sure almost that the Australian colonies would, ere this, have been applying to be placed in the same rank as The Kingdom of Canada.

He added as a postscript that it was adopted on the suggestion of British colonial ministers to avoid offending republican sensibilities in the United States:

P.S. On reading the above over I see that it will convey the impression that the change of title from Kingdom to Dominion was caused by the Duke of Buckingham. This is not so. It was made at the instance of Lord Derby, then foreign minister, who feared the first name would wound the sensibilities of the Yankees. I mentioned this incident in our history to Lord Beaconsfield at Hughenden in 1879, who said, 'I was not aware of the circumstance, but it is so like Derby, a very good fellow, but who lives in a region of perpetual funk.'

Use of the term dominion was formalized in 1867 through Confederation. In the Constitution of Canada, namely the Constitution Act, 1867 (British North America Acts), the preamble of the act indicates:

Whereas the Provinces of Canada, Nova Scotia, and New Brunswick have expressed their Desire to be federally united into One Dominion under the Crown of the United Kingdom of Great Britain and Ireland, with a Constitution similar in Principle to that of the United Kingdom....

Moreover, section 2 indicates that the provinces:

... shall form and be One Dominion under the Name of Canada; and on and after that Day those Three Provinces shall form and be One Dominion under that Name accordingly.

=== French terms ===
The French translation of the 1867 British North America Act (BNA Act) translated "One Dominion under the Name of Canada" as "une seule et même Puissance sous le nom de Canada" using Puissance ('power') as a translation for dominion. Later, the English loanword dominion was also used in French.

The Fathers of Confederation met at the Quebec Conference of 1864 to discuss the terms of this new union. One issue on the agenda was to determine the Union's "feudal rank" (see Resolution 71 of the Quebec Conference, 1864). The candidates for the classification of this new union were: le Royaume du Canada ('the Kingdom or Realm of Canada'), l'Union du Canada ('the Union of Canada'), and le Dominion du Canada ('the Dominion of Canada').

=== Use of Dominion ===
There are numerous references in United Kingdom Acts of Parliament to "the Dominion of Canada;" and the British North America Act, 1867 referred to the formation of "one Dominion under the name of Canada". Section 4 of the BNA Act also declares that: "Unless it is otherwise expressed or implied, the Name Canada shall be taken to mean Canada as constituted under this Act;" this has been interpreted to mean that the title of the country is simply Canada. The term "Dominion of Canada" alongside "Parliament of Canada" appears in the Constitution Act, 1871—the usage of which was "sanctioned" "Dominion of Canada" also appeared on Canadian banknotes before 1935.

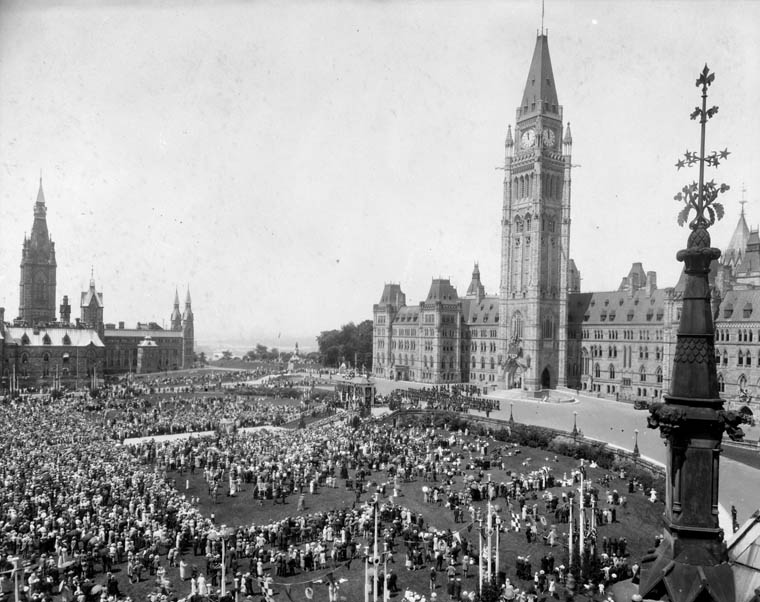
Crowds on Parliament Hill celebrate Dominion Day 1927, the 60th jubilee of confederation

Until the 1950s, the term Dominion of Canada was commonly used to identify the country in Canadian and British references. As the country acquired political authority and autonomy from the United Kingdom, the federal government began using simply Canada on state documents. Quebec nationalist leaders also objected to the term dominion in its French translations, arguing that it suggested Ottawa had control over Quebec.

Under Prime Minister Louis St-Laurent, the federal government ended the practice of using "Dominion" in the Statutes of Canada in 1951. "Dominion" was retired in official names and statements, usually replaced by "federal".

The independence of the separate Commonwealth realms was emphasised after the accession of Queen Elizabeth II in 1952, when she was proclaimed not just as Queen of the United Kingdom, but also Queen of Canada, Queen of Australia, Queen of New Zealand, Queen of South Africa, and of all her other "realms and territories". This also reflected the change from dominion to realm; in the proclamation of Queen Elizabeth II's new titles in 1953, the phrase "of her other Realms and Territories" replaced "dominion" with another mediaeval French word with the same connotation, "realm" (from royaume).

With that said, the national holiday of "Dominion Day" kept that name until 1982, when a private member's bill to replace the name with Canada Day that had received first reading in May 1980 was unexpectedly passed in the House. In the Senate, Eugene Forsey and the Monarchist League of Canada strongly defended the traditional usage. When a Gallup poll showed 70% of all Canadians favoured the change, the Senate approved the bill without a recorded vote.

The Canada Act 1982 refers only to Canada and does not use the term dominion. No constitutional statute amends this name, nor does any Canadian legal document state that the name of the country is anything other than Canada. Moreover, official sources of the United Nations system, international organizations (such as the Organization of American States), the European Union, the United States, and other polities with which Canada has official relations as a state either consistently use Canada as the only official name, affirm that Canada has no long-form name, or affirm that the formal name is simply Canada. In a dissenting opinion, Forsey and others, in an essay in The Canadian Encyclopedia argue that Dominion of Canada is still the formal name of the country, albeit rarely used now.

The terms Dominion and Dominion of Canada, although arcane, continued to be used occasionally in Government of Canada publications and educational materials, albeit not in legal or official documents. For instance, in 2008 the Canadian government registered the Maple Leaf Tartan, designed in 1964, with the Scottish Tartans Authority. The tartan's alternate name is "Dominion of Canada".

These terms have been used in essays to distinguish contemporary (post-1867) Canada from either the earlier Province of Canada or from the even earlier The Canadas and modern history of the Commonwealth. The terms had also been used to distinguish the federal government from the provinces, though in this usage, "federal" has replaced "dominion". For example, The Canadian Almanac stopped using Dominion of Canada in 1964.

== See also ==
- List of Canadian place names of royal heritage
- Canadian provincial and territorial name etymologies
- Origins of names of cities in Canada
- List of Canadian place names of Ukrainian origin
- List of Canadian place names of Indigenous origin
- List of Canadian place names of English origin
- List of Canadian place names of Scottish origin
- List of Canadian place names of Spanish origin
