= Laurentian language =

Extinct branch of the Iroquoian language family

Laurentian
- Native to: Canada
- Region: Saint Lawrence River Valley
- Ethnicity: St. Lawrence Iroquoians
- Extinct: late 16th century
- Language family: Iroquoian: Northern?; Laurentian

Language codes
- ISO 639-3: lre
- Glottolog: laur1250
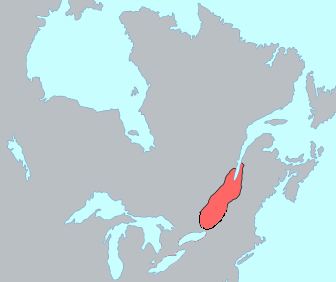
- Territory occupied by the St. Lawrence Iroquois, circa 1535

Laurentian, or St. Lawrence Iroquoian, was an Iroquoian language spoken until the late 16th century along the shores of the Saint Lawrence River in present-day Quebec and Ontario, Canada. It is believed to have disappeared with the extinction of the St. Lawrence Iroquoians, likely as a result of warfare by the more powerful Mohawk from the Haudenosaunee or Iroquois Confederacy to the south, in present-day New York state of the United States.

== History ==
The explorer Jacques Cartier observed in 1535 and 1536 about a dozen villages in the valley between Stadacona and Hochelega, the sites of the modern cities of Quebec City and Montreal. Archeologists have unearthed other villages farther west, near the eastern end of Lake Ontario. St. Lawrence Iroquoians lived in villages which were usually located a few kilometres (miles) inland from the Saint-Lawrence River, and were often enclosed by a wooden palisade. Up to 2000 persons lived in the larger villages.

By the time the explorer Samuel de Champlain arrived in 1608, however, he found no trace of the Iroquoians visited by Jacques Cartier some 75 years earlier. Scholars have developed several theories to explain the complete disappearance of the St. Lawrence Iroquoians, among them devastating wars waged by the Mohawk from the south, epidemics of Old World infectious diseases, or migration towards the Great Lakes region. Archeological evidence points most strongly to devastating wars with neighbouring Iroquoian tribes, the Huron and the nations of the Iroquois League, especially the Mohawk.

== Classification ==
Several dialects of Laurentian may have existed in the 16th century in the St. Lawrence River valley. The sparse records made by Jacques Cartier during his voyages cannot be considered conclusive, and the Laurentians may have spoken several distinct languages. A few Laurentian words are still in use today as toponyms: most notably the word canada, meaning "village" in Laurentian. Jacques Cartier used the word to describe both the region and the river that crosses it. The name of Donnacona, the Iroquoian chieftain Cartier met at Stadacona, remains in use as the name of the town of Donnacona, Quebec. Hochelaga remains in use in the Montreal borough of Hochelaga-Maisonneuve and the alternate spelling "Osheaga" serves as the name of Montreal's annual Osheaga Festival.

On the basis of the Laurentian vocabularies of Cartier, the linguist Marianne Mithun concludes that Laurentian was an Iroquoian language, and its speakers were "clearly in contact with the Lake Iroquoian peoples [Huron and Iroquois]" (Mithun, 1981). Charles Julian analyzed the available lexicon and compared it with those of Iroquoian languages still spoken in the 21st century and found that it shared the highest number of cognates with Huron, Mohawk, and Onondaga, with 47 cognates found for all three. Many sound changes are found in common with Huron such as the reduction of consonant clusters containing /j/, however Laurentian also shares features with other Northern Iroquoian languages that Huron lacks. For example Laurentian shows the existence of an epenthetic vowel like found in Susquehannock, Old Mohawk and, Old Onondaga but not in Huron. Because of this he concludes that Laurentian forms its own subgroup within Northern Iroquoian.

== Phonology ==
The presumed phoneme inventory of Laurentian is as follows (using the International Phonetic Alphabet).

=== Consonants ===
	Alveolar	Palato-alveolar / Palatal	Velar	Glottal
Nasal	n			
Plosive / Affricate	t ts		k kʷ	ʔ
Fricative	s	ʃ		h
Approximant	ɹ	j	w	

Julian describes Laurentian /t/ and /k/ as having voiced allophones [d] and [ɡ] between vowels or between a vowel and approximant or nasal consonant. Likewise, /ts/ may have voiced to [dz] or [dʒ] between vowels or voiced consonants. The /w/ seems to have been pronounced [m] before a nasal vowel. The /ɹ/ may have been pronounced as a lateral in some words.

=== Vowels ===
	Front	Central	Back
High	i iː		
Mid, nasalized	ẽ ẽː		õ õː
Mid	e eː		o oː
Low		a aː	

An epenthetic vowel was in some cases pronounced between sequences of consonants in which one was an approximant or nasal.

== Vocabulary ==
In 1545 Jacques Cartier published a journal of his voyages, including the first list of Laurentian words. Here are some examples (numbers and parts of the human body), as written by Cartier:

English (from French)	Laurentian
one	segada
two	tigneny
three	asche
four	honnacon
five	ouiscon
head	aggourzy
eyes	hegata
ears	ahontascon
mouth	escahe
teeth	esgougay
tongue	osvache
village	canada

A second shorter vocabulary list was appended to his journal of his first voyage, which was published much later, first in Italian and later in English and French.
