= Literary Review of Canada =

Literary magazine

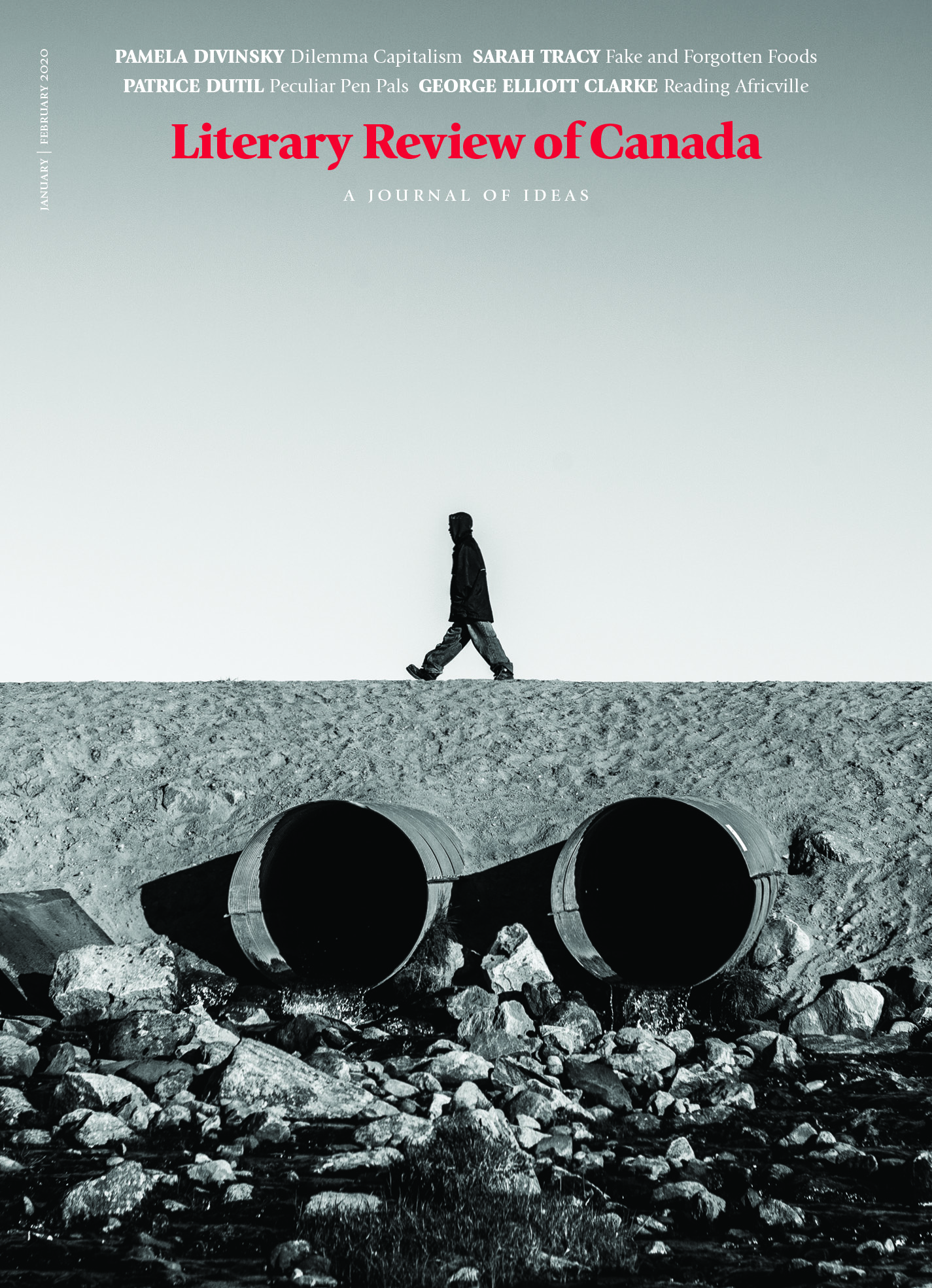
- January/February 2020 cover of the Literary Review of Canada
- Editor: Kyle Wyatt
- Frequency: Ten per year
- Founded: 1991; 35 years ago
- First issue: November 1991
- Country: Canada
- Based in: Toronto, Ontario
- Website: reviewcanada.ca
- ISSN: 1188-7494
- OCLC: 26245206

The Literary Review of Canada is a Canadian magazine that publishes ten times a year in print and online. The magazine features essays and reviews of books on political, cultural, social, and literary topics, as well as original Canadian poetry.

== History ==
The Literary Review of Canada was founded in 1991 in Toronto by Patrice Dutil and published for the first time in November 1991. In late 1996, after publishing fifty-five issues, Dutil sold the magazine to Carleton University Press. In 1998, the magazine was sold to partners David Berlin, Denis Deneau, and, later, Helen Walsh. Berlin left in 2001, the same year that Mark Lovewell joined as partner and eventually co-publisher. Deneau left in early 2003. Bronwyn Drainie was hired as editor in 2003 and held the position until 2015. The magazine's editor from July 2016 until October 2018 was Sarmishta Subramanian. Kyle Wyatt has been the magazine's editor since January 2019.

The Literary Review of Canada unveiled its list of the 100 most important Canadian books ever published in the January/February 2006 and March 2006 issues. The list ran in chronological order, starting with Jacques Cartier's Bref récit et succincte narration de la navigation faite en MDXXXV et MDXXXVI, published in 1545, and ending with Jane Jacobs' Dark Age Ahead, published in 2004.

In September 2008, the magazine published the winning selection of its New Voices call for essays, "Progressivism's End" by David Eaves and Taylor Owen. Essays by Andrew Ng and John Robson were also published online.

On its twenty-fifth anniversary, in the fall of 2016, the magazine published "The LRC 25" supplement, a selection of the most influential non-fiction books published in Canada during that time. The chosen titles were presented by Canadian luminaries like Niigan Sinclair, Nahlah Ayed and Lee Maracle. The thirtieth anniversary was marked with the November 2021 issue, the largest in the magazine's history.

In 2019, the Literary Review of Canada relocated its offices to Massey College in the University of Toronto, where it stayed until taking space at the Trader's Bank Building in downtown Toronto in November 2025. In May 2021, the magazine was nominated for Magazine of the Year (Art, Literary, and Culture) as part of the 2021 National Magazine Awards. At the 2022 National Magazine Awards, it won Cover Grand Prix for its March 2021 cover, illustrated by David Parkins. At the 2025 National Magazine Awards, it won Best Magazine: Art, Literary, and Culture.

== Readership ==
The magazine's audience tends to be upper-middle class and highly educated: in 2012, 85 percent of readers are over forty-five; 61 percent have household incomes $100,000 or over; and 41 percent have PhDs.

== Staff ==
Longtime publisher Helen Walsh stepped down in September 2017 and was replaced by board member Mark Lovewell. Past editors include founder Patrice Dutil, David Berlin, Lewis DeSoto, Anthony Westell, Bronwyn Drainie, and Sarmishta Subramanian.

The current poetry editor is Moira MacDougall. Past poetry editors include A.J. Levin, George Murray, Matt Williams, Fred Wah, and Molly Peacock.

Articles are illustrated by original artwork by illustrators such as Tina Seeman, Barbara Klunder, Tom Pokinko, Silvia Nickerson, Aino Anto, Kevin Sylvester, Clarke MacDonald, Aimee Van Drimmelin, and David Parkins. Photography has also been featured regularly since the magazine unveiled a complete redesign with the January/February 2020 issue.

Board members are Dimitry Anastakis, Sara Angel, David W. Binet, Brendan Dellandrea, Kevin Garland, Sandy Houston, John Edward Macfarlane, Anna Porter, Richard Rooney, Mary Angela Rowe, Julien Russell Brunet, and David Staines. In addition to serving as editor-in-chief of the magazine, Kyle Wyatt is executive director of the Literary Review of Canada Charitable Foundation.

Writers who have been published in the magazine include Margaret Atwood, Lloyd Axworthy, John Bemrose, Conrad Black, Lynn Crosbie, Charles Foran, Brad Fraser, Marcus Gee, Michael Geist, Joan Givner, Jack Granatstein, Richard Gwyn, Ezra Levant, David M. Malone, Alberto Manguel, Barbara McDougall, David Macfarlane, Preston Manning, Pankaj Mishra, Rex Murphy, Sylvia Ostry, Gilles Paquet, Casey Plett, Bob Rae, Noah Richler, Kent Roach, Wade Rowland, John Ralston Saul, Janice Stein, Moez Surani, Drew Hayden Taylor, Michael Valpy, Jennifer Welsh and Zoe Whittall.
