= Culture of New France =

The intellectual life in New France can be characterized as having been dominated by the interests and pursuits of Catholic clergy, military officers and aristocrats who dominated the political scene. Intellectual work of New France is often concerned with themes and topics relating to native peoples, Christianity, societal organization, geography, military organization and transportation. At least a significant portion of intellectual work of in New France was constructed for pragmatic reasons – often the result of exploratory expeditions or diplomatic relations. Figures such as Louis-Armand de Lom d'Arce de Lahontan, Baron de Lahontan have been quintessential in the creation of the concept of the so-called “noble-savage” in comparing aspects of aboriginal culture and society with those of Christianity. Voyages commissioned by the government and Crown of France would often serve as the basis of material for works on geography and travel –some of which have remained important volumes in the body of literature concerning North American colonial and Canadian history such as Charlevoix’s Histoire et description générale de la Nouvelle-France

Notable Intellectuals

- Jaques Cartier: An early explorer and claimant of New France known for his work "Bref récit"
- Louis-Armand de Lom d'Arce de Lahontan, Baron de Lahontan: An officer in the French Marines in Canada, as well as an explorer and commentator on native society and geography
- Pierre François Xavier de Charlevoix: A Jesuit priest, explorer and geographer responsible for several works including Histoire et description générale de la Nouvelle-France
- François Dollier de Casson: A Sulpician monk who contributed to the work "L'Histoire du Montréal"
- Nicolas Denys: A French explorer and colonist who wrote the Description Géographiqe et historique des costes de l’Amérique septentrionale, avec l’histoire naturelle du pais
