= Canadian Federation =

Canadian Federation may refer to:

- Canada, a sovereign state in North America which is a federation of provinces and territories
- Federalism in Canada, the relationship between Canada's central government and its constituent provinces and territories
- Canadian Confederation, the 1867 event in which separate provinces formed a federation Canada

== See also ==
- Federal government of Canada, the central government of Canada
- Dominion of Canada, archaic title of Canada
