= Bref récit =

1545 account by Jehan Poullet

Bref récit et succincte narration de la navigation faite en MDXXXV et MDXXXVI (translated into English as A Shorte and Briefe Narration of the Two Nauigations and Discoueries to the Northwest Partes called Newe Fraunce) is a literary work published in 1545, which recounts Jacques Cartier’s second voyage to the St. Lawrence Valley region of North America and details his interactions with the local St. Lawrence Iroquoian peoples. The book was more than likely written by Cartier's secretary, Jehan Poullet.

Reingard M. Nischik's History of Literature in Canada explains the importance of the Bref récit as follows:

"The work documents Cartier’s voyage from the Strait of Belle Isle all the way to Hochelaga (the site of present day Montreal), followed by a hard winter in Stadacona (present-day Quebec City). The main importance of the accounts of Cartier’s voyages lay primarily in their political consequences and only secondarily in the value of the scientific or geographical information they contained. They were originally written as exploration reports for the French king François I. The Bref récit gained much popular appeal due to the extraordinary adventure it portrayed as it was a direct account of the discovery and exploration of a new continent and its peoples."

The book is noted, in part, for providing the historical documentation for the name of Canada.

In 2005, the Literary Review of Canada named Bref récit as one of the 100 most important books in the history of Canadian literature.
