= Donnacona =

Iroquois chief in Quebec (died c. 1539)

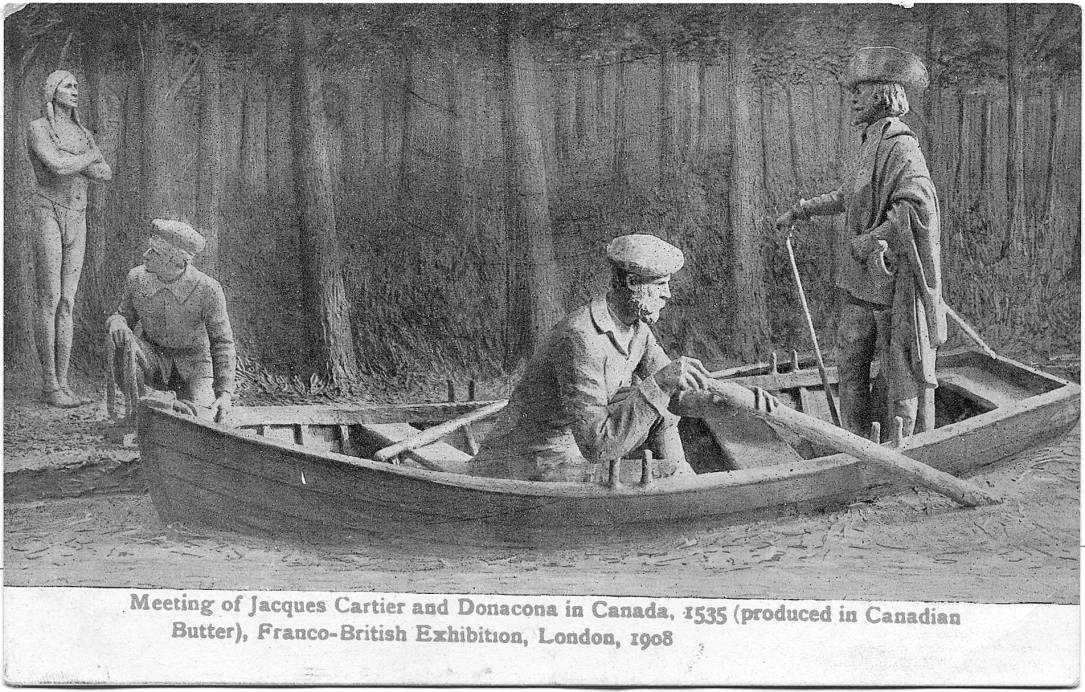
- Meeting of Jacques Cartier and Donnacona. Postcard of butter sculpture tableau, Franco-British Exhibition, London, 1908.
- Born: Canada
- Died: c. 1539; France
- Other name: Chief of Stadacona
- Known for: First Nations chief being taken to France by Jacques Cartier

Chief Donnacona (died c. 1539 in France) was the chief of the St. Lawrence Iroquoian village of Stadacona, located at the present site of Quebec City, Quebec, Canada. French explorer Jacques Cartier, concluding his second voyage to what is now Canada, conspired with Donnacona's rival chief Agona to exile him to France, where Donnacona died. Later Cartier would make a third voyage to the same area.

== Cartier's first voyage ==
Jacques Cartier made three voyages to the land now called Canada, in 1534, 1535 and 1541. In late July 1534, in the course of his first voyage, he and his men encountered two hundred people fishing near Gaspé Bay. Cartier's men erected a "thirty foot long" cross which provoked a reaction from the leader of this fishing party. After some presentation of gifts to the people there, he left the area the next day, with two men on board, Domagaya and Taignoagny, from the fishing party. He returned to France with them, concluding his first voyage in September 1534.

Though Cartier is sometimes described as kidnapping Domagaya and Taignoagny, the original sources indicate that they went willingly as part of a friendly agreement between the French and Iroquoians. Some sources say that these men were the sons of Donnacona and the fishing party's leader was Donnacona himself, although the original 16th-century report does not mention this directly.

Upon the 25 of the month, we caused a faire high Crosse to be made of the height of thirty feet, [...] in the top was carved in the wood with Anticke letters this posie, Vive le Roi de France. [...] And after we were returned to our ships, their Captain clad with an old Bears skin, with three of his sons, and a brother of his with him, came unto us in one of their boats, but they came not so near us as they were want to do so: there he made a long Oration unto us, showing us the cross we had set up, and making a cross with two fingers, then did he showed us all the Country about us, [...]. One of our fellowes that was in our boat, tooke hold on theirs, and suddenly leapt into it, with two or three more, who enforced them to enter into our ships, whereat they were greatly astonished. But our Captain did straight-waies assure them, that they should have no harme, nor any injurie offered them at all, and entertained them very friendly, making them eate and drinke. Then did we shew them with signes, that the crosse was but onely set up to be as a light and leader which wayes to enter into the port, and that wee would shortly come againe, and bring good store of iron wares and other things, but that we would take two of his children with us, and afterward bring them to the sayd port againe: and. so wee clothed two of them in shirts, and coloured coates [...] we gave to each one of those three that went back, a hatchet, and some knives, which made them very glad. After these were gone, and had told the newes unto their fellowes, in the afternoone there came to our ships sixe boates of them, with six men in everyone, to take their farewells of those two we had detained to take with us [...] How after we were departed from the sayd porte, following our voyage along the said coast, we went to discover the land lying Southeast, and Northwest. The next day, being the 25 of the month, we had faire weather and went from the said port : and being out of the river, we sailed Eastnortheast, for after the entrance into the said river[...]

The source later says:

After we had cast anker betwene the said great Iland, and the Northerly coast, we went on land and tooke our two wild men with vs, meeting with many of these countrey people, who would not at all approch vnto vs, but rather fled from vs, vntill our two men began to speake vnto them, telling them that they were Taignoagoy and Domagaia [...]

It is likely that Taignoagoy and Domagaya went with Cartier willingly, as opposed to being kidnapped, given that Cartier brought them back as promised in the following year and that they continued to act as guides in subsequent explorations.

== Cartier's second voyage ==
Jacques Cartier's voyage began 19 May 1535 with Domagaya and Taignoagny as guides. They showed Cartier the entrance to the St. Lawrence River, and piloted him upriver to L'Isle-aux-Coudres and on to Donnacona's capital, Stadacona. (Cartier gives Donnacona's title as Agohanna, an Iroquoian word for chief.) Also as part of this voyage, Cartier went further up the St. Lawrence to Hochelega, present-day Montreal, on 2 October 1535, without Domagaya and Taignoagny, who were stopped by the chief from going with him.

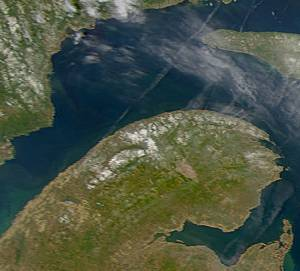
NASA satellite image of the Gaspé Peninsula. Part of Anticosti Island (Cartier's Island of the Assumption) appears to the northeast.

In the year of our Lord 1535, vpon Whitsunday, being the 16. of May, by the commandement of our Captaine Iames Cartier, and with a common accord, in the Cathedrall Church of S. Malo we deuoutly each one confessed a selues, and receiued the Sacrament [...]. The Wednesday following, being the 19. of May, there arose a good gale of wind, and therefore we hoysed sayle with three ships [...]

[...]beyond the abouesayd hauen about ten leagues, where we found a goodly great gulfe, full of Islands, passages, and entrances toward what wind soeuer you please to bend: for the knowledge of this gulfe there is a great Island that is like to a Cape of lande [...] We named the sayd gulfe Saint Laurence his bay. [...] The next day after being our Ladie day of August the fifteenth of the moneth, hauing passed the Straight, we had notice of certaine lands that wee left toward the South, which landes are full of very great and high hilles, and this Cape wee named The Island of the Assumption [...]

But for a resolution of the matter Taignoagny and Domagaia tolde our Captaine, that their Lord Donnacona would by no meanes permit that any of them should goe with him to Hochelaga vnlesse he would leaue him some hostage to stay with him: our Captaine answered them, that if they would not goe with him with a good will, they should stay, and that for all them he would not leaue off his iourney thither.

[...] our Captaine with all his Gentlemen and fiftie Mariners departed with our Pinnesse, and the two boates from Canada to goe to Hochelaga: and also there is described, what was seene by the way vpon the said riuer.

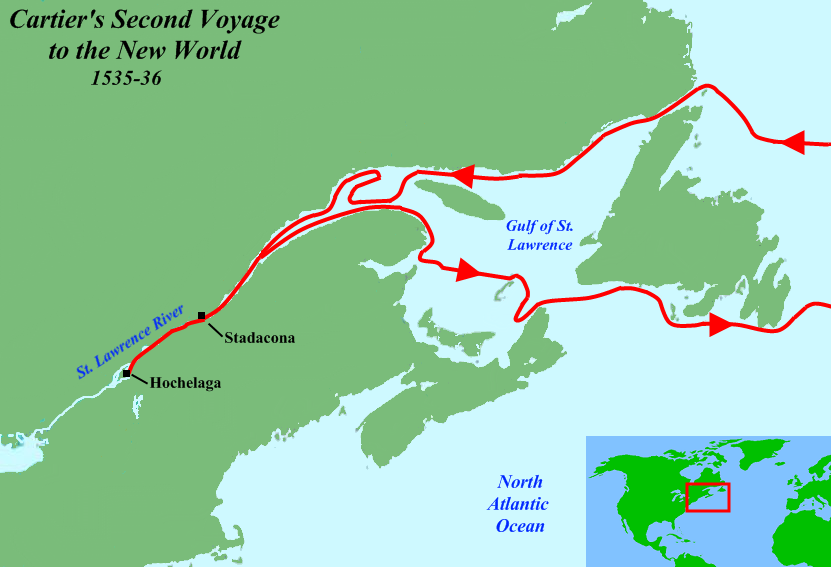
Route of Cartier's second voyage.

As recorded in Cartier's journal, the French wintered in Canada. Relations between the St. Lawrence Iroquoian and French deteriorated over the winter. During the winter, twenty-five French sailors died of scurvy. In spring, tensions developed between Donnacona and his rival Agona over the leadership of Stadacona. Donnacona briefly disappeared and then returned with new supporters who refused to receive Cartier's embassy. Cartier was then asked by Donnacona's son to forcibly remove Agona by taking him to exile in France.

Cartier, however, sided with Agona and conspired to exile Donnacona and his sons instead. Cartier thought Agona would better support French interests, and he also wanted to take Donnacona to the French king so he might personally tell the tale of a country further north, called the "Kingdom of Saguenay", said to be full of gold, rubies and other treasures. In May 1536 Cartier tricked Donnacona into attending an ostensibly peaceful meeting and then seized him and his sons. Reassuring the people of Stadacona that they would all return, Cartier then set sail with Donnacona, his two sons, and seven other members of the tribe that may or may not have gone willingly, including several children. It was an arduous trip down the St. Lawrence and a three-week Atlantic crossing. Donnacona and the nine others, including Domagaya and Taignoagny, arrived in Saint-Malo, France on 15 July 1536, concluding Cartier's second voyage.

Donnacona was treated well in France and looked after at the king's expense. The presence of these Iroquoian visitors whetted the French appetite for New World exploration with their tales of a golden kingdom called "Saguenay". Cartier had promised to bring Donnacona back in 12 moons, but Donnacona remained in France until he died around 1539. It is not known whether he remained willingly or unwillingly, though he was reported to have converted to Christianity before his death, as did three of the other Iroquoians. All but one of the Iroquoians died at the same time as Donnacona; the one surviving was a little girl whose fate is unknown.

Cartier returned to the new land in May 1541, on his third voyage, without any of those whom he had brought to France. That voyage lasted until his return in May 1542. Despite his having helped Agona, relations worsened between the French and Iroquois. When violence ultimately broke out, more than 35 of Cartier's men were killed before the rest escaped by ship. It is likely that Cartier's perceived betrayal of Donnacona was the origin of the tensions and contributed to the start of the French-Iroquois wars.

A report of Cartier's second voyage was printed in France in 1545 and is today in the British Museum. Excerpts given here are taken from Burrage, using Richard Hakluyt's English translation published in 1589–1600.

== Legacy ==
Donnacona is remembered by a town, which now bears his name, on the north shore 30 mi (48 km) west of Quebec City, at the confluence of the Saint Lawrence and the Jacques-Cartier Rivers.

In 1981, Donnacona was recognized as a National Historic Person by the government of Canada. A plaque commemorating this is located at the Cartier-Brébeuf National Historic Site, 175 De L'Espinay St, Québec, Quebec.

HMCS Donnacona, a stone frigate, is located in Montreal, QC.
