= Kingdom of Saguenay =

Mythical kingdom supposedly located inland of present-day Quebec, Canada

The Kingdom of Saguenay (French: Royaume du Saguenay) was a mythical kingdom that French-Breton maritime explorer Jacques Cartier tried to reach in 1535, supposedly located inland of present-day Quebec, Canada. The indigenous people had told Cartier about a rich kingdom and Cartier was given two ships by the French government to explore countries beyond Newfoundland. In 1542 Cartier founded the Charlesbourg-Royal settlement and his mates initially thought they had found large amounts of diamonds and gold in the area. The treasures were shipped back to France, but turned out to be quartz crystals and iron pyrites.

== Historic evaluation ==
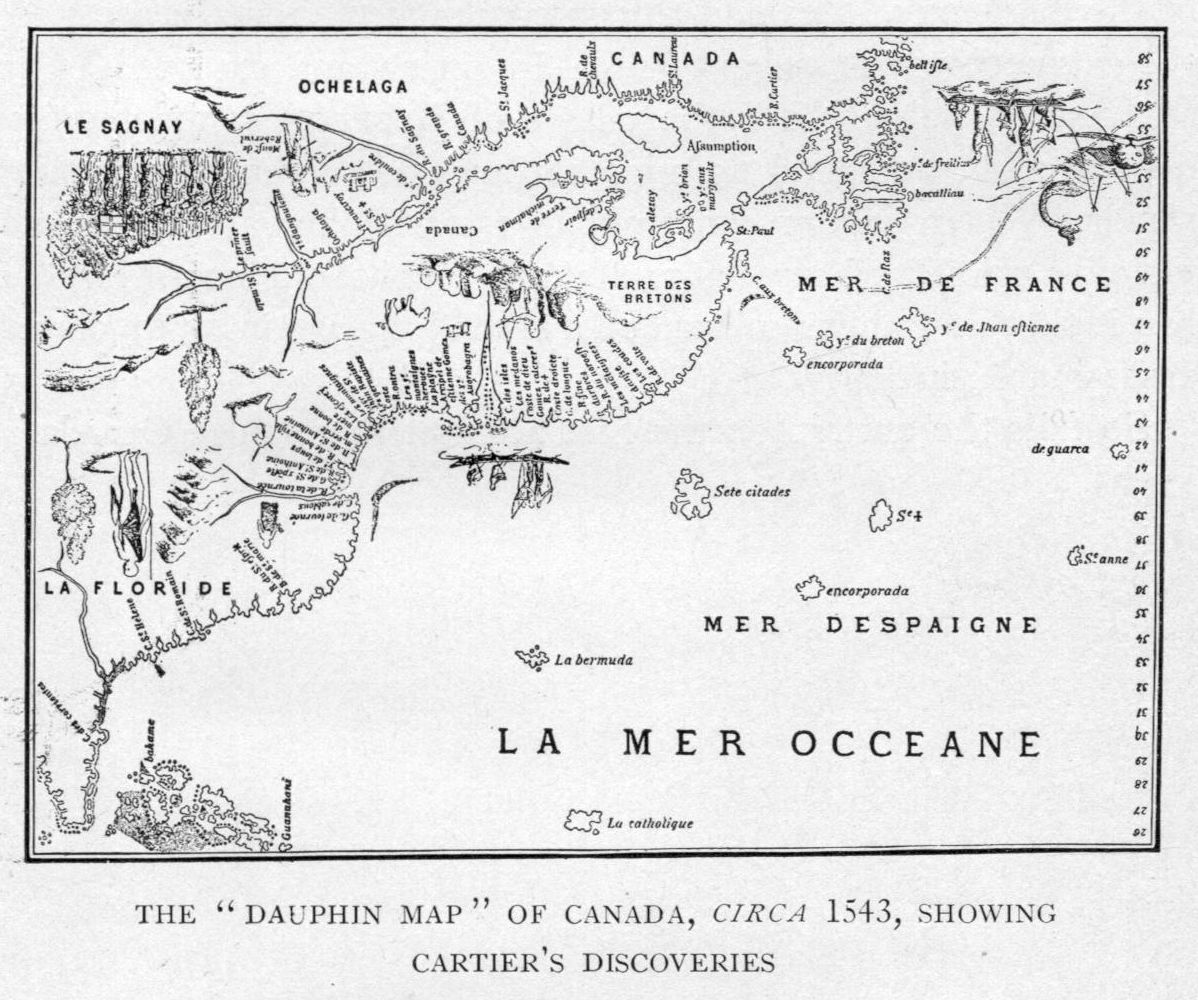
The Dauphin Map of Canada, circa 1543, showing the discoveries of Jacques Cartier.

In 1986 the American historian Samuel Eliot Morison wrote about the search for the Kingdom of Saguenay by explorers in the time period between 1538 and 1543, during which France regarded the search as a means to an end. France had paid for Cartier's third voyage so as to rebalance power in the nation's favour. After all, England had profited from the discoveries of John Cabot while Spain acquired wealth from mines in Mexica and Peru.

In 1997 the Canadian historian Daniel Francis reached the conclusion that Cartier "believed in the fanciful kingdom of Saguenay, rich in gold and diamonds, some of whose inhabitants knew how to fly." Other explorers held similar beliefs about the North of present-day Canada, including Martin Frobisher and Samuel Hearne.

== See also ==
- Norumbega
- El Dorado
- Blond Eskimos
