= Jacques Cartier =

French maritime explorer of North America (1491–1557)

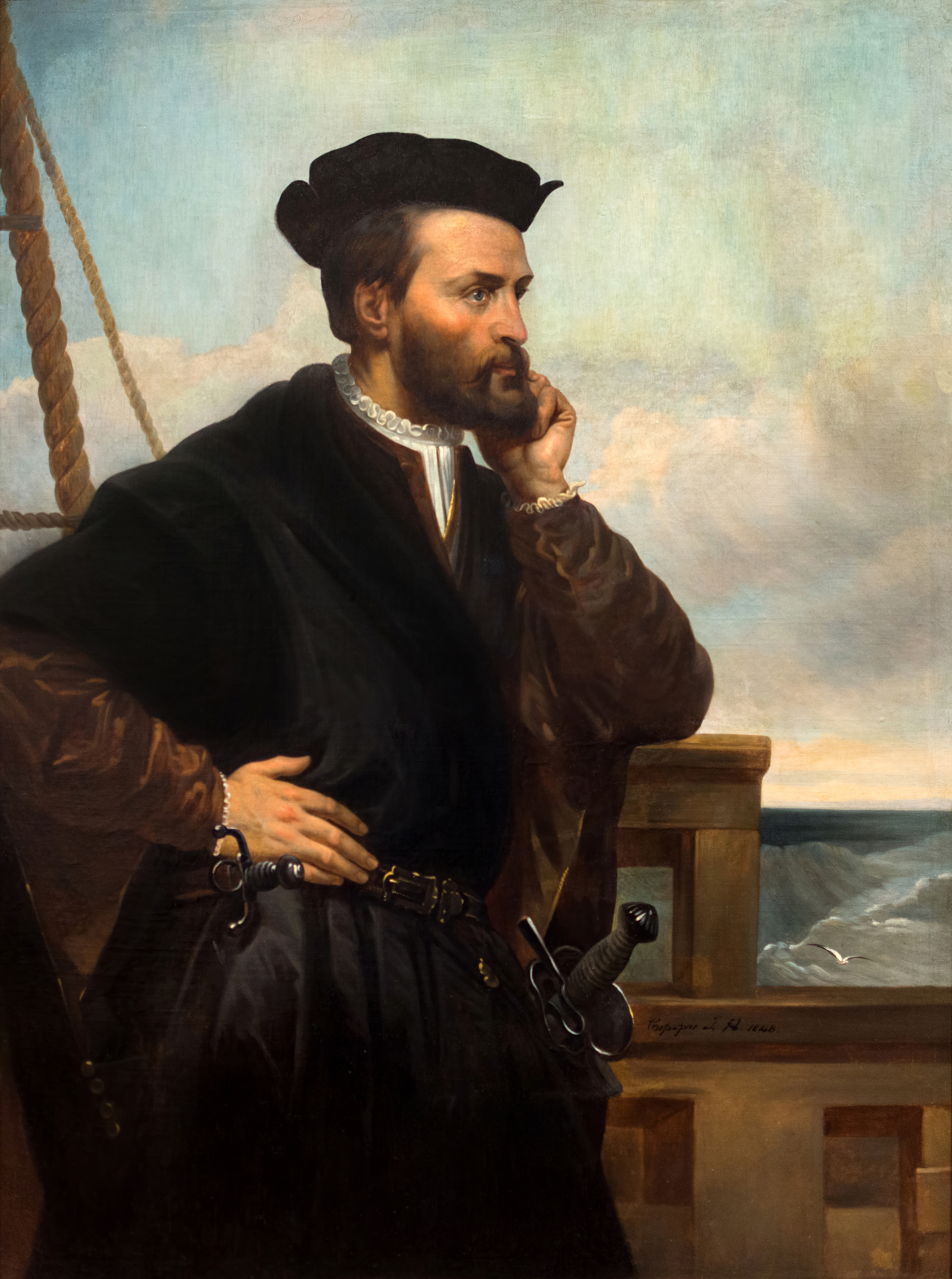
- Portrait by Théophile Hamel, c. 1844. No contemporary portraits of Cartier are known.
- Born: 31 December 1491; Saint-Malo, Duchy of Brittany
- Died: 1 September 1557 (aged 65); Saint-Malo, France
- Occupations: Navigator and explorer
- Known for: First European to travel inland in North America. Claimed what is now known as Canada for the Kingdom of France.
- Spouse: Mary Catherine des Granches (m. 1520)

Jacques Cartier (Note: Pronunciation: UK: /ˈkɑːrtieɪ/ KAR-tee-ay, US also /ˌkɑːrtiˈeɪ, kɑːrˈtjeɪ/ KAR-tee-AY, kar-TYAY, French: [ʒak kaʁtje], Quebec French: [- kaʁt͡sje].) (Breton: Jakez Karter; 31 December 1491 – 1 September 1557) was a French maritime explorer from Brittany. Jacques Cartier was the first European to describe and map the Gulf of Saint Lawrence and the shores of the Saint Lawrence River, which he named "Canada" after the Iroquoian names for the two big settlements he saw at Stadacona (Quebec City) and at Hochelaga (Montreal Island).

Jacques Cartier, author of now-lost maps and accounts of his voyages, was the first European to describe and name this region and its inhabitants—at a time when the Spanish had already settled in the Caribbean, Mexico, and Central America, and were beginning their conquest of Peru.

== Early life ==
Jacques Cartier was born in 1491 in Saint-Malo, the port on the north-east coast of Brittany. Cartier, who was a respectable mariner, improved his social status in 1520 by marrying Mary Catherine des Granches, member of a leading aristocratic family. His good name in Saint-Malo is recognized by its frequent appearance in baptismal registers as godfather or witness.

== First voyage (1534) ==
In 1534, two years after the Duchy of Brittany was formally united with the French crown in the Edict of Union, Cartier was introduced to King Francis I by Jean Le Veneur, bishop of Saint-Malo and abbot of Mont Saint-Michel, at the Manoir de Brion. The King had previously invited (although not formally commissioned) the Florentine explorer Giovanni da Verrazzano to explore the eastern coast of North America on behalf of France in 1524. Le Veneur cited voyages to Newfoundland and Brazil as proof of Cartier's ability to "lead ships to the discovery of new lands in the New World".

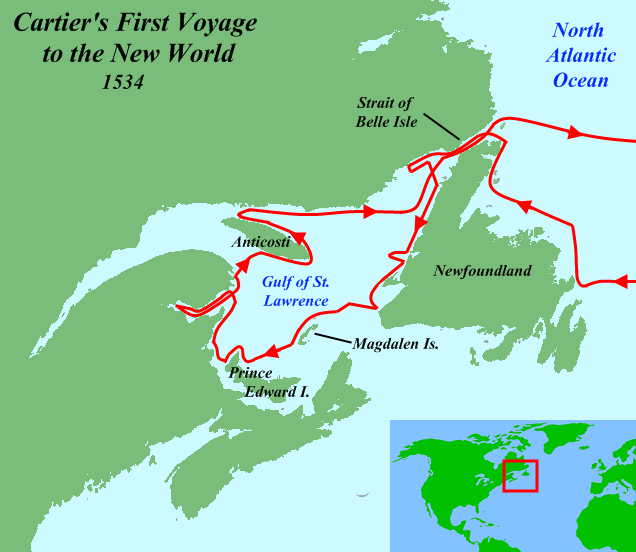
Route of Cartier's first voyage

On 20 April 1534, Cartier set sail under a commission from the king, hoping to discover a western passage to the wealthy markets of the East Indies. In the words of the commission, he was to "discover certain islands and lands where it is said that a great quantity of gold and other precious things are to be found".

It took him twenty days to sail across the ocean. Starting on 10 May of that year, he explored parts of Newfoundland, the Strait of Belle Isle and southern shore of the Labrador Peninsula, the Gaspé and North Shore coastlines on the Gulf of St. Lawrence, and some parts of the coasts of the Gulf's main islands, including Prince Edward Island, Anticosti Island and the Magdalen Islands. During one stop at Îles aux Oiseaux (Islands of the Birds, now the Rochers-aux-Oiseaux federal bird sanctuary, northeast of Brion Island in the Magdalen Islands), his crew slaughtered around 1000 birds, most of them great auks (extinct since 1852). Cartier's first two encounters with aboriginal peoples in Canada on the north side of Chaleur Bay, most likely the Mi'kmaq, were brief; some trading occurred.

His third encounter took place on the shores of Gaspé Bay with a party of St. Lawrence Iroquoians, where on 24 July he planted a cross to claim the land for France. The 10-metre cross bearing the words "Long Live the King of France" claimed possession of the territory in the King's name. The change in mood was a clear indication that the Iroquoians understood Cartier's actions. Here he kidnapped the two sons of their chief, Donnacona. Cartier wrote that they later told him this region where they were captured (Gaspé) was called by them Honguedo. The natives' chief at last agreed that they could be taken, under the condition that they return with European goods to trade.

Cartier returned to France in September 1534, sure that he had reached an Asian land.

== Second voyage (1535–1536) ==
Jacques Cartier set sail for a second voyage on May 19 of the following year with three ships, 110 men, and his two Iroquoian captives. Reaching the St. Lawrence, he sailed upriver for the first time, and reached the Iroquoian capital of Stadacona, where Chief Donnacona ruled. Cartier claimed a land near St. Lawrence River in 1534; but France paid little attention to the colony for 60 years. Not until King Henry IV sent Samuel de Champlain in 1608 to New France as its governor and built a permanent settlement and a fur-trading post called Quebec.

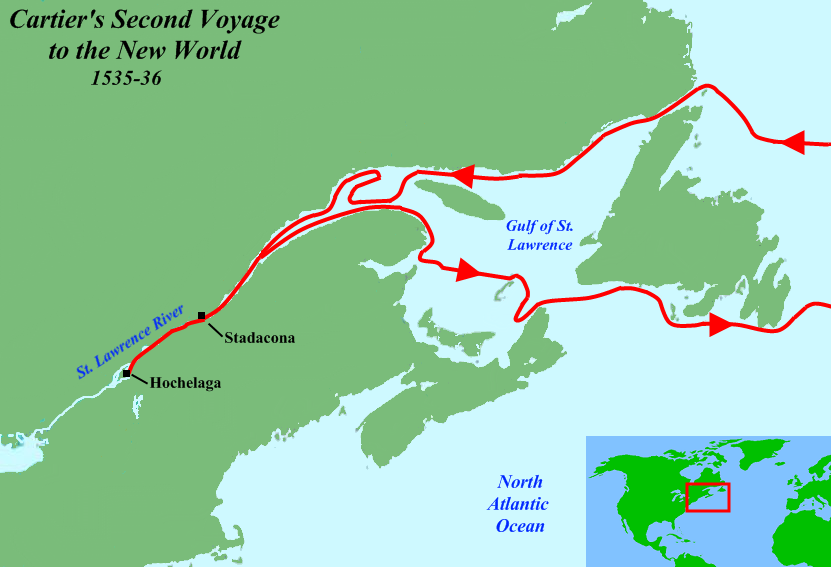
Route of Cartier's second voyage.

Cartier left his main ships in a harbour close to Stadacona, and used his smallest ship to continue on to Hochelaga (now Montreal), arriving on October 2, 1535. Hochelaga was far more impressive than the small and squalid village of Stadacona, and a crowd of over a thousand came to the river's edge to greet the Frenchmen. The site of their arrival has been confidently identified as the beginning of the Sainte-Marie Sault – where the bridge named after him now stands. The expedition could proceed no further, as the river was blocked by rapids. So certain was Cartier that the river was the Northwest Passage, and that the rapids were all that was preventing him from sailing to China, that the rapids and the town that eventually grew near them came to be named after the French word for China, La Chine: the Lachine Rapids and the town of Lachine, Quebec.

After spending two days among the people of Hochelaga, Cartier returned to Stadacona on October 11. It is not known exactly when he decided to spend the winter of 1535–1536 in Stadacona, and it was by then too late to return to France. Cartier and his men prepared for the winter by strengthening their fort, stacking firewood, and salting down game and fish.

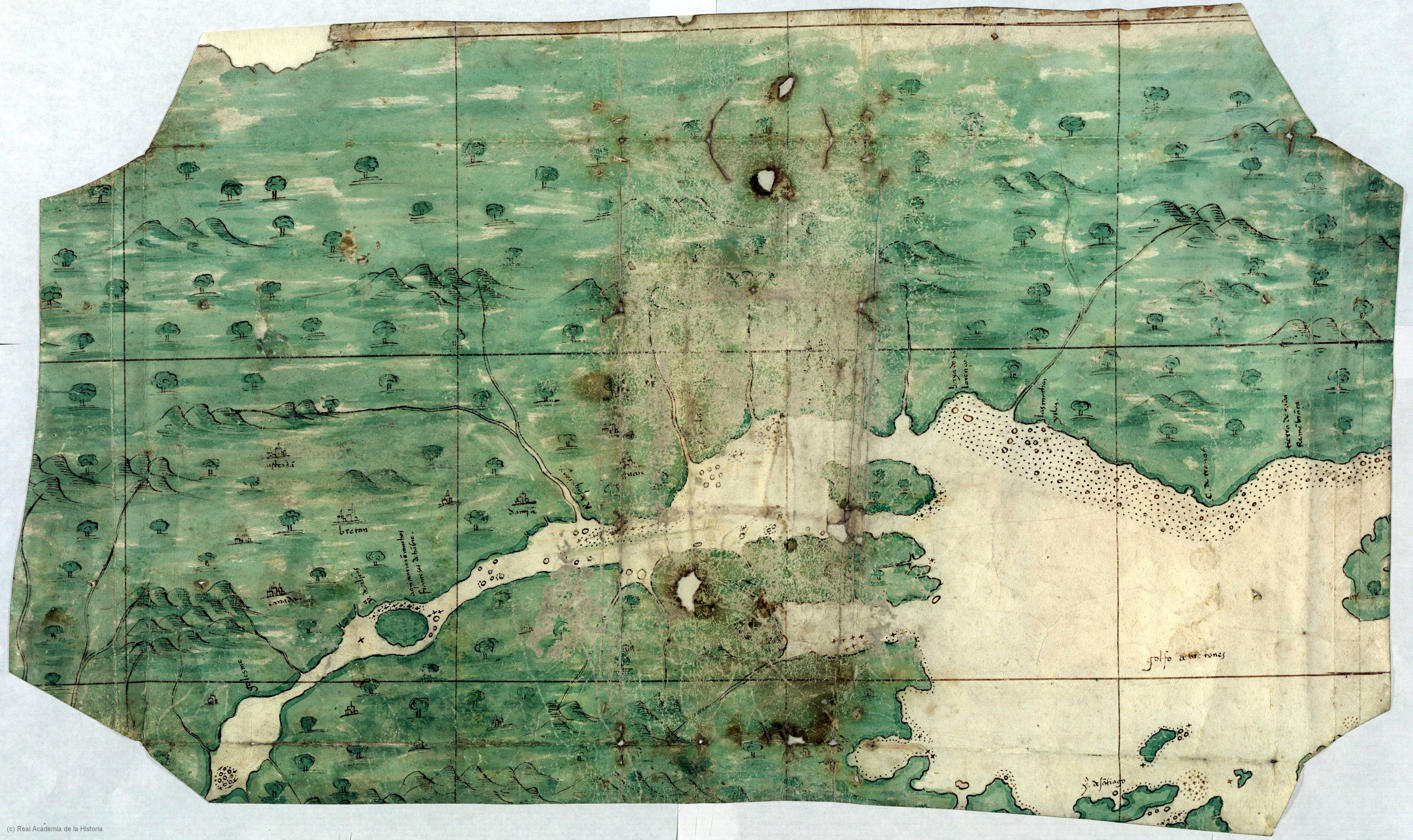
This Spanish chart of the Saint Lawrence River, from c. 1541, contains a legend in front of the "isla de Orliens" that says: "Here many French died of hunger"; possibly alluding to Cartier's second settlement in 1535–1536.

From mid-November 1535 to mid-April 1536, the French fleet lay frozen solid at the mouth of the St. Charles River, under the Rock of Quebec. Ice was over a fathom (1.8 m) thick on the river, with snow four feet (1.2 m) deep ashore. To add to the misery, scurvy broke out – first among the Iroquoians, and then among the French. Cartier estimated the number of dead Iroquoians at 50. On a visit by Domagaya to the French fort, Cartier inquired and learned from him that a concoction made from a tree known as annedda, probably Spruce beer, or arbor vitae, would cure scurvy. This remedy likely saved the expedition from destruction, allowing 85 Frenchmen to survive the winter. In his journal, Cartier states that by mid-February, "out of 110 that we were, not ten were well enough to help the others, a pitiful thing to see". The Frenchmen used up the bark of an entire tree in a week on the cure, and the dramatic results prompted Cartier to proclaim it a Godsend, and a miracle.

Ready to return to France in early May 1536, Cartier decided to kidnap Chief Donnacona and take him to France, so that he might personally tell the tale of a country further north, called the "Kingdom of Saguenay", said to be full of gold, rubies and other treasures. After sailing down the St. Lawrence and crossing the Atlantic, Cartier and his men reached Saint-Malo on 16 July 1536, bringing the second voyage to an end.

== Third voyage (1541–1542) ==
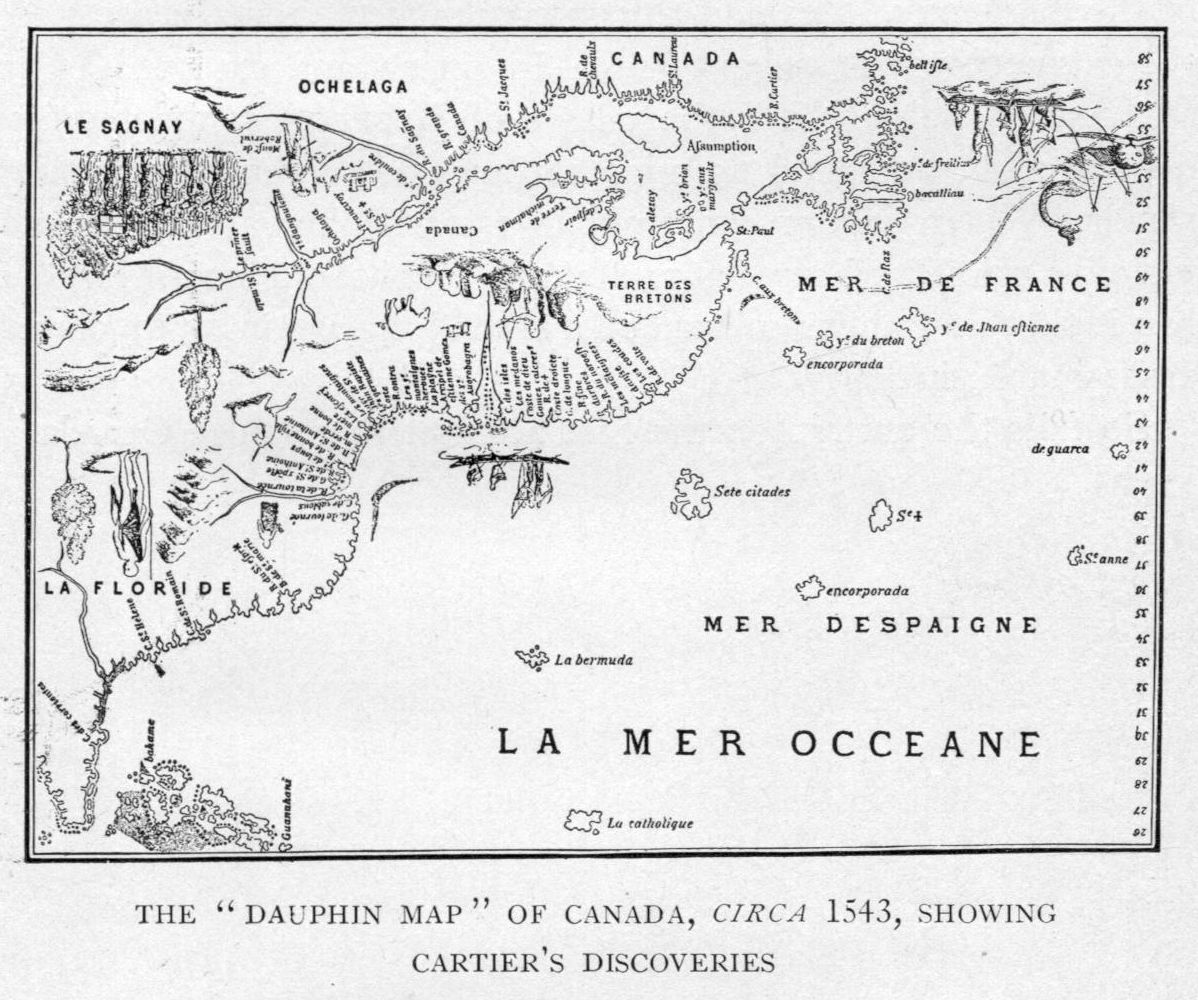
The Dauphin Map of Canada, c. 1543, showing Cartier's discoveries. Newfoundland is near the upper right; Florida and the Bahamas are at lower left

On October 17, 1540, Francis ordered the navigator Jacques Cartier to return to Canada to lend weight to a colonization project of which he would be "captain general". However, January 15, 1541 saw Cartier supplanted by Jean-François de La Rocque de Roberval, a Huguenot courtier and friend of the king named as the first lieutenant general of French Canada. Roberval was to lead the expedition, with Cartier as his chief navigator. While Roberval waited for artillery and supplies, he gave permission to Cartier to sail on ahead with his ships.

On May 23, 1541, Cartier departed Saint-Malo on his third voyage with five ships. This time, any thought of finding a passage to the Orient was forgotten. The goals were now to find the "Kingdom of Saguenay" and its riches, and to establish a permanent settlement along the St. Lawrence River.

Anchoring at Stadacona, Cartier again met the Iroquoians, but found their "show of joy" and their numbers worrisome, and decided not to build his settlement there. Sailing a few kilometres upriver to a spot he had previously observed, he decided to settle on the site of present-day Cap-Rouge, Quebec. The convicts and other colonists were landed, the cattle that had survived three months aboard ship were turned loose, earth was broken for a kitchen garden, and seeds of cabbage, turnip, and lettuce were planted. A fortified settlement was thus created and was named Charlesbourg-Royal. Another fort was also built on the cliff overlooking the settlement, for added protection.

The men also began collecting what they believed to be diamonds and gold, but which upon return to France were discovered to be merely quartz crystals and iron pyrites, respectively—which gave rise to a French expression: "faux comme les diamants du Canada" ("As false as Canadian diamonds"). Two of the ships were sent on their journey home with some of these minerals on September 2.

Having set tasks for everyone, Cartier left with the longboats for a reconnaissance in search of "Saguenay" on September 7. Having reached Hochelaga, he was prevented by bad weather and the numerous rapids from continuing up to the Ottawa River.

Returning to Charlesbourg-Royal, Cartier found the situation ominous. The Iroquoians no longer made friendly visits or peddled fish and game, but prowled about in a sinister manner. No records exist about the winter of 1541–1542 and the information must be gleaned from the few details provided by returning sailors. It seems the natives attacked and killed about 35 settlers before the Frenchmen could retreat behind their fortifications. Even though scurvy was cured through the native remedy (Thuja occidentalis infusion), the impression left is of a general misery, and of Cartier's growing conviction that he had insufficient manpower either to protect his base or to go in search of the Saguenay Kingdom.

Cartier left for France in early June 1542, encountering Roberval and his ships along the Newfoundland coast, at about the time Roberval marooned Marguerite de La Rocque. Despite Roberval's insistence that he accompany him back to Saguenay, Cartier slipped off under the cover of darkness and continued on to France, still convinced his vessels contained a wealth of gold and diamonds. He arrived there in October, in what proved to be his last voyage. Meanwhile, Roberval took command at Charlesbourg-Royal, but it was abandoned in 1543 after disease, foul weather and hostile natives drove the would-be settlers to despair.

== Later life ==
Cartier spent the rest of his life in Saint-Malo and his nearby estate, where he often was useful as an interpreter in Portuguese. He died at age 65 on September 1, 1557, during an epidemic, possibly of typhus, though many sources list his cause of death as unknown. Cartier is interred in Saint-Malo Cathedral.

No permanent European settlements were made in Canada before 1605, when Pierre Dugua, with Samuel Champlain, founded Port Royal in Acadia.

== Legacy ==
External videos
- " Jacques Cartier" – Historica Canada. - Heritage Minutes (1:01 min)

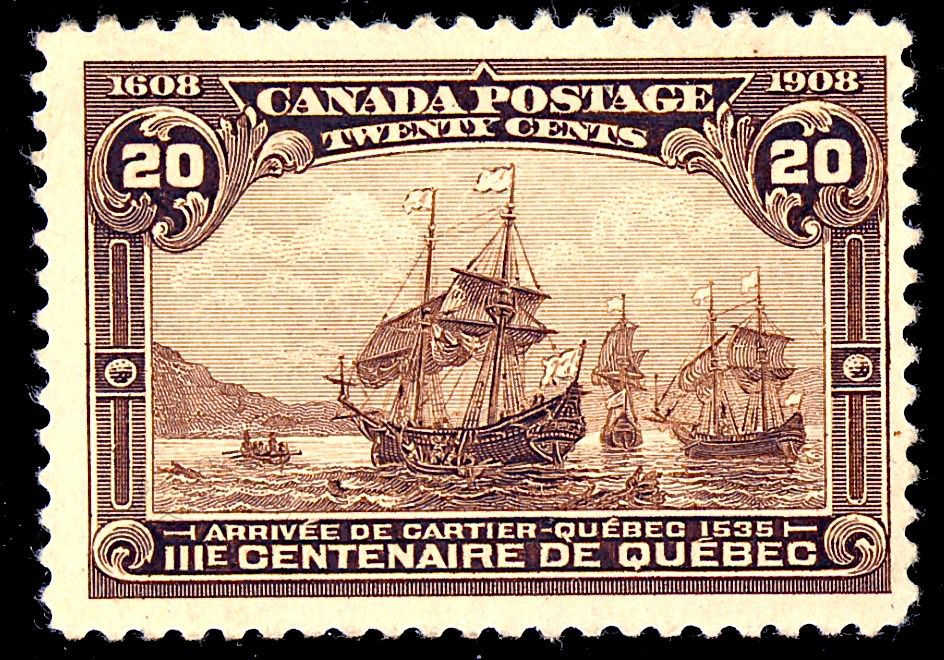
The Fleet of Cartier was commemorated on a 1908 Canadian postage stamp.

Having located the entrance to the St. Lawrence on his first voyage, he opened up a major waterway for the European penetration of North America. He produced an intelligent estimate of the resources of Canada, both natural and human, albeit with a considerable exaggeration of its mineral wealth. While some of his actions toward the St. Lawrence Iroquoians were questionable, he did try at times to establish ties with them and other native peoples living along the St. Lawrence River—an indispensable preliminary to French settlement in their lands.

Cartier was the first to document the name Canada to designate the territory on the shores of the St-Lawrence River. The name is derived from the Huron–Iroquois word kanata, or village, which was incorrectly interpreted as the native term for the newly discovered land. Cartier used the name to describe Stadacona, the surrounding land and the river itself. And Cartier named Canadiens the inhabitants (Iroquoians) he had seen there. Thereafter the name Canada was used to designate the small French colony on these shores, and the French colonists were called Canadiens until the mid-nineteenth century, when the name started to be applied to the loyalist colonies on the Great Lakes and later to all of British North America. In this way Cartier is not strictly the European discoverer of Canada as this country is understood today, a vast federation stretching a mari usque ad mare (from sea to sea). Eastern parts had previously been visited by the Norse, as well as Basque, Galician and Breton fishermen, and perhaps the Corte-Real brothers and John Cabot (in addition of course to the natives who first inhabited the territory). Cartier's particular contribution to the discovery of Canada is as the first European to penetrate the continent, and more precisely the interior eastern region along the St. Lawrence River. His explorations consolidated France's claim of the territory that would later be colonized as New France, and his third voyage produced the first documented European attempt at settling North America since that of Lucas Vázquez de Ayllón in 1526–27.

Cartier's professional abilities can be easily ascertained. Considering that Cartier made three voyages of exploration in dangerous and hitherto unknown waters without losing a ship, and that he entered and departed some 50 undiscovered harbours without serious mishap, he may be considered one of the most conscientious explorers of the period.

Cartier was also one of the first to formally acknowledge that the New World was a land mass separate from Europe/Asia.

== Rediscovery of Cartier's first colony ==
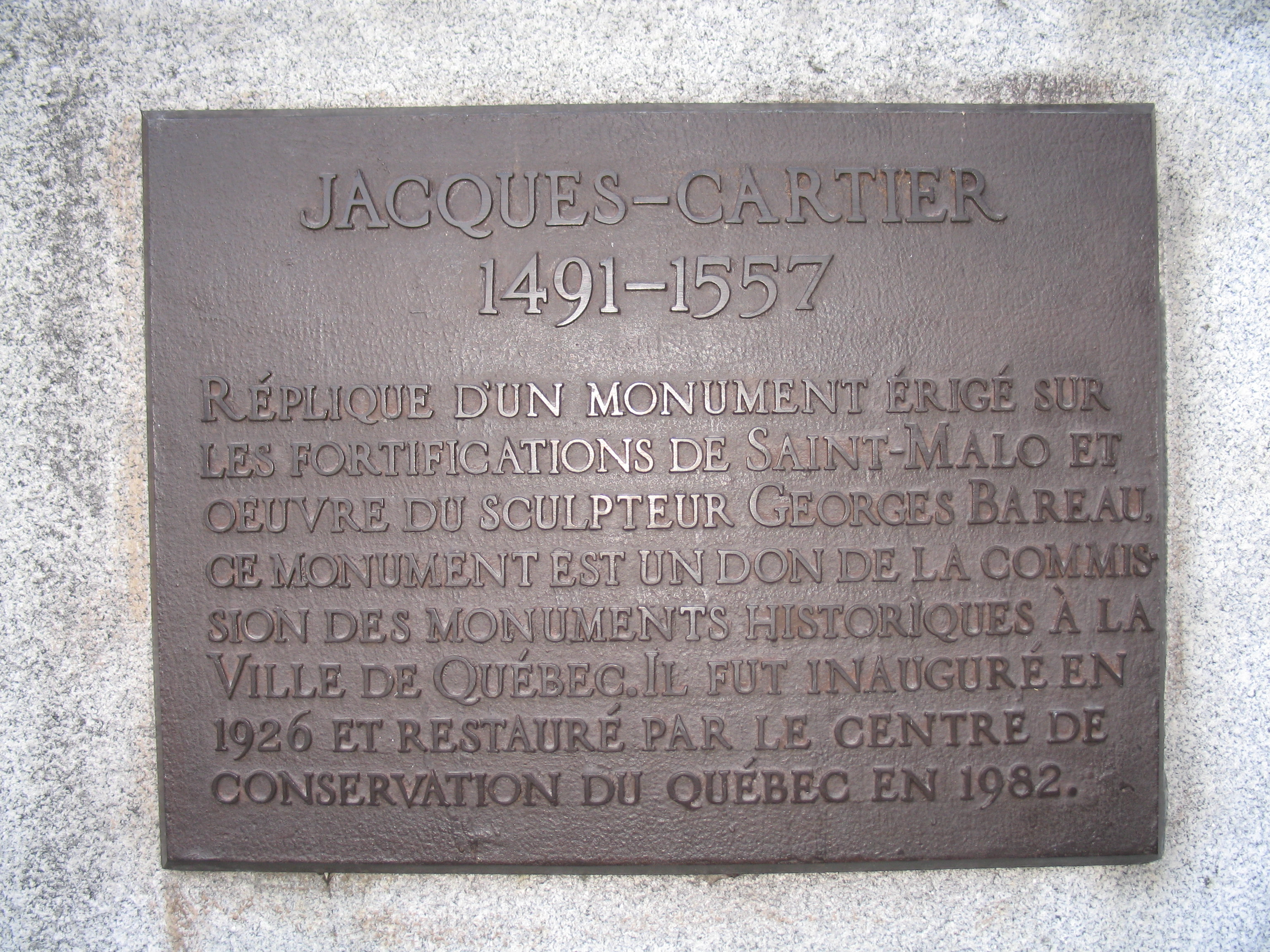
Plaque on the statue of Jacques Cartier in front of the Gabrielle-Roy public library, in the Saint-Roch neighbourhood of Quebec City.

On August 18, 2006, Quebec Premier Jean Charest announced that Canadian archaeologists had discovered the precise location of Cartier's lost first colony of Charlesbourg-Royal. The colony was built at the confluence of the Rivière du Cap Rouge with the St. Lawrence River and is based on the discovery of burnt wooden timber remains that have been dated to the mid-16th century, and a fragment of a decorative Istoriato plate manufactured in Faenza, Italy, between 1540 and 1550, that could only have belonged to a member of the French aristocracy in the colony. Most probably this was the Sieur de Roberval, who replaced Cartier as the leader of the settlement. This colony was the first known European settlement in modern-day Canada since the c. 1000 L'Anse aux Meadows Viking village in northern Newfoundland. Its rediscovery has been hailed by archaeologists as the most important find in Canada since the L'Anse aux Meadows rediscovery.

== Ships ==
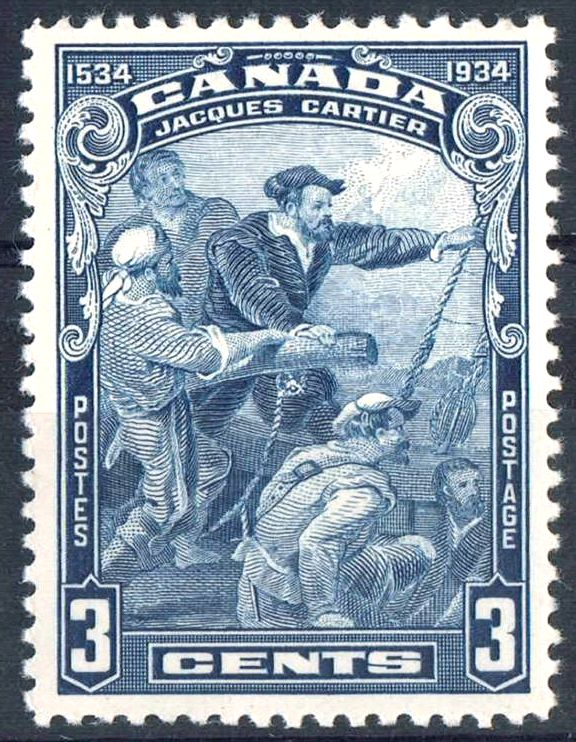
Jacques Cartier on a 1934 Canadian postage stamp

- Grande Hermine
  - Built: France 1534; given in 1535 to Cartier by the King of France; used in the 1535–1536 and 1541–1542 voyages; replica 1967 built for Expo 67 in Montréal; abandoned in 2001 from Saint-Charles River (Québec City)
- Petite Hermine
  - Built: France; used in the 1535–1536 voyage and abandoned in 1536 springtime by Cartier in Saint-Charles River because too many of his sailors died in Québec City during last wintertime
- Émérillon
  - Built: France; used in the 1535–1536 and 1541–1542 voyages
- Georges (1541–1542)
  - Built: France; used in the 1541–1542 voyage
- Saint-Brieux
  - Built: France; used in the 1541–1542 voyage

== Monuments, remembrances and other art ==
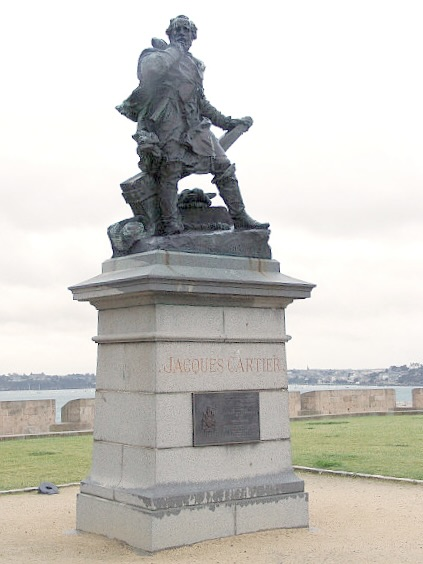
Jacques Cartier Monument in Saint-Malo

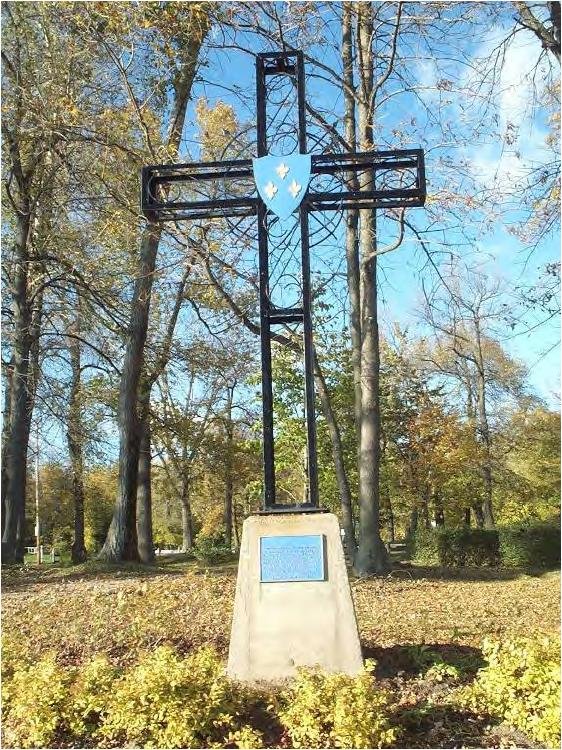
Croix Jacques Cartier on Saint-Quentin Island

Jacques Cartier Island, located on the tip of the Great Northern Peninsula in Newfoundland and Labrador in the town of Quirpon, is said to have been named by Jacques Cartier himself on one of his voyages through the Strait of Belle Isle during the 1530s.

- Jacques-Cartier River, a tributary at Donnacona, Quebec of the St. Lawrence River
- Jacques-Cartier Park in Gatineau, Quebec
- Jacques Cartier Bridge, a steel-truss bridge between Montreal and Longueil, Quebec
- Jacques Cartier Provincial Park, located 5 km east of Alberton, PEI
- Jacques-Cartier State Park, in St. Lawrence County, New York
- Place Jacques-Cartier, a square in Old Montreal
- Cartier Pavilion, built in 1955, at Royal Military College Saint-Jean
- Jacques Cartier Monument, in Harrington Harbour, Quebec
- The province of Quebec's Parliament Building tower, which was built between 1877 and 1886 by Eugène-Étienne Taché, is dedicated to Cartier
- Manoir de Limoelou, Saint-Malo houses the Musee Jacques Cartier
- plaque at Saint-Malo cathedral
- Cartier-Brébeuf National Historic Site, Quebec City
- Statuary
  - at his birthplace, Rothéneuf
  - Quebec City, in front of Gabrielle-Roy public library
  - at Palais de la Découverte, Paris
  - by Joseph-Arthur Vincent in Montreal: Place Jacques-Cartier
  - bronze at PEI's Jacques Cartier Provincial Park
  - cast iron sculptures at Gaspe, Quebec
  - cross monument at Gaspe, Quebec
  - cross monument at Saint-Quentin Island near Trois-Rivières Quebec
  - by Joseph-Émile Brunet
  - in Saint-Malo
- Paintings
  - Charles Walter Simpson, Saint-Malo, April 1534
  - C.W. Simpson, Jacques Cartier at Gaspé, 1534
  - Jean Antoine Théodore de Gudin, Jacques Cartier découvre et remonte le fleuve Saint-Laurent au Canada en 1535
  - Walter Baker, The Arrival of Cartier at Stadacona, 1535
  - Lawrence R. Batchelor, Jacques Cartier at Hochelaga (Montreal)
  - Adrien Hébert, Jacques Cartier atterit à Hochelaga en 1535
  - Lucien Boudot and Fernand Cerceau, Jacques Cartier est reçu par le chef Agouhana
  - Alfred Faniel, Jacques Cartier sur le sommet du mont Royal
  - Frank Craig, Jacques Cartier Relating the Story of His Discovery to Francis I at Fontainebleau
  - Walter Baker, Jacques Cartier's Return to Stadacona, 1541
  - Théophile Hamel, Portrait imaginaire de Jacques Cartier (reproduced on many stamps)
  - Léopold Massard and de Clugny, Jacques Cartier Navigateur
  - Auguste Lemoine (1895) after François Riss, Portrait of Jacques Cartier (Musée d'Histoire de Saint-Malo)
  - Charles William Jefferys, Cartier meets the Indians of the St. Lawrence, 1535
  - Napoleon Sarony (c. 1850) Jacques Cartier – His First Interview with the Indians at Hochelaga
  - Paul-Émile Borduas, Les voyages de Jacques Cartier au Canada en 1534 et 1535
  - Paul-Émile Borduas, Plan d'Hochelaga par Jacques Cartier en 1535

== Popular references ==
The Banque Jacques-Cartier existed, and printed banknotes, between 1861 and 1899 in Lower Canada, then Quebec. It was folded into the Banque provinciale du Canada, and later still the National Bank of Canada.

In 2005, Cartier's Bref récit et succincte narration de la navigation faite en MDXXXV et MDXXXVI was named one of the 100 most important books in Canadian history by the Literary Review of Canada.

Canadian rock band The Tragically Hip reference Jacques Cartier in their 1992 song "Looking for a Place to Happen". The song deals with the subject of European encroachment in the New World and the eventual annexation of indigenous lands in North America.

== See also ==
- Jacques Cartier strait, in Gulf of St. Lawrence
- Francis I of France, sent Jacques Cartier and others to claim lands in the Americas for France
- Timeline of New France history (1534 to 1607)
- Christopher Columbus

== Bibliography ==
- Biggar, H. P. (1924). The Voyages of Jacques Cartier. Ottawa: Public Archives of Canada.
