= Wade Rowland =

Canadian writer

- Born: 1944 (age 81–82)
- Occupations: Author; Journalist
- Spouse: Christine Collie
- Children: Simon Rowland; Hilary Rowland

Wade Rowland is a Canadian science, technology, and history writer. He is currently an emeritus Professor at Toronto's York University.

== Biography ==
Rowland was born in Montreal, Quebec in 1944. He was married in 1978 to Christine Collie, with whom he has two children, Simon and Hilary Rowland.

Rowland has worked as a journalist for the Winnipeg Free Press, the Toronto Telegram, and Canadian television networks CBC and CTV. He holds a Ph.D. in communication and culture from Toronto's York University, where he taught from 2005 to 2020. He was granted tenure in 2009. He has lectured at Trent University in Peterborough, Ontario, and is a former Maclean Hunter Chair of Ethics in Communication at Toronto Metropolitan University (formerly Ryerson University), Toronto. He is currently an emeritus professor of media and communications at York University. He has resided in Port Hope, Ontario, since 1982.

== Books ==
- (1972) The Pollution Guide (with Tiny Bennett) Toronto, Clarke Irwin
- (1973) The Plot to Save the World: The Life and Times of the Stockholm Conference on the Human Environment (Toronto, Clarke Irwin and Co.)
- (1974) Fuelling Canada's Future (Toronto, Macmillan Co.)
- (1979) Making Connections: The Behind-the-Scenes Story (Toronto, Gage Publishing)
- (1981) How to Find Relief from Migraine (with Rosemary Dudley) (Toronto, Collins)
- (1985) Nobody Calls Me Mr. Kirck (with Harvey Kirck) (Toronto, Collins)
- (1989) Polar Passage: The Historic First Sail through the Northwest Passage (with Jeff MacInnis) (Toronto, Random House)
- (1979) Spirit of the Web: The Age of Information from Telegraph to Internet (Toronto, Somerville House Books)
- (1999) Ockham's Razor: A Search for Wonder In An Age of Doubt (Toronto, Key Porter Books)
- (2001) Galileo's Mistake: A New Look at the Epic Confrontation between Galileo and the Church (Toronto, Thomas Allen; New York, Arcade Books)
- (2005) Greed, Inc.: Why Corporations Rule Our World and How We Let It Happen (Toronto, Arcade Publishing; New York, Arcade Books)
- (2013) Saving the CBC: Balancing Profit and Public Service (Montreal, Linda Leith Publishing)
- (2015) Canada Lives Here: The Case for Public Broadcasting (Montreal, Linda Leith Publishing)
- (2019) Morality By Design: Technology's Challenge to Human Values (Bristol, U.K., Intellect Ltd.)
- (2023) The Storm of Progress: Climate Change, AI, and the Roots of Our Dangerous Ethical Myopia (Montreal, Linda Leith Publishing)
