= Hochelaga (village) =

- Village
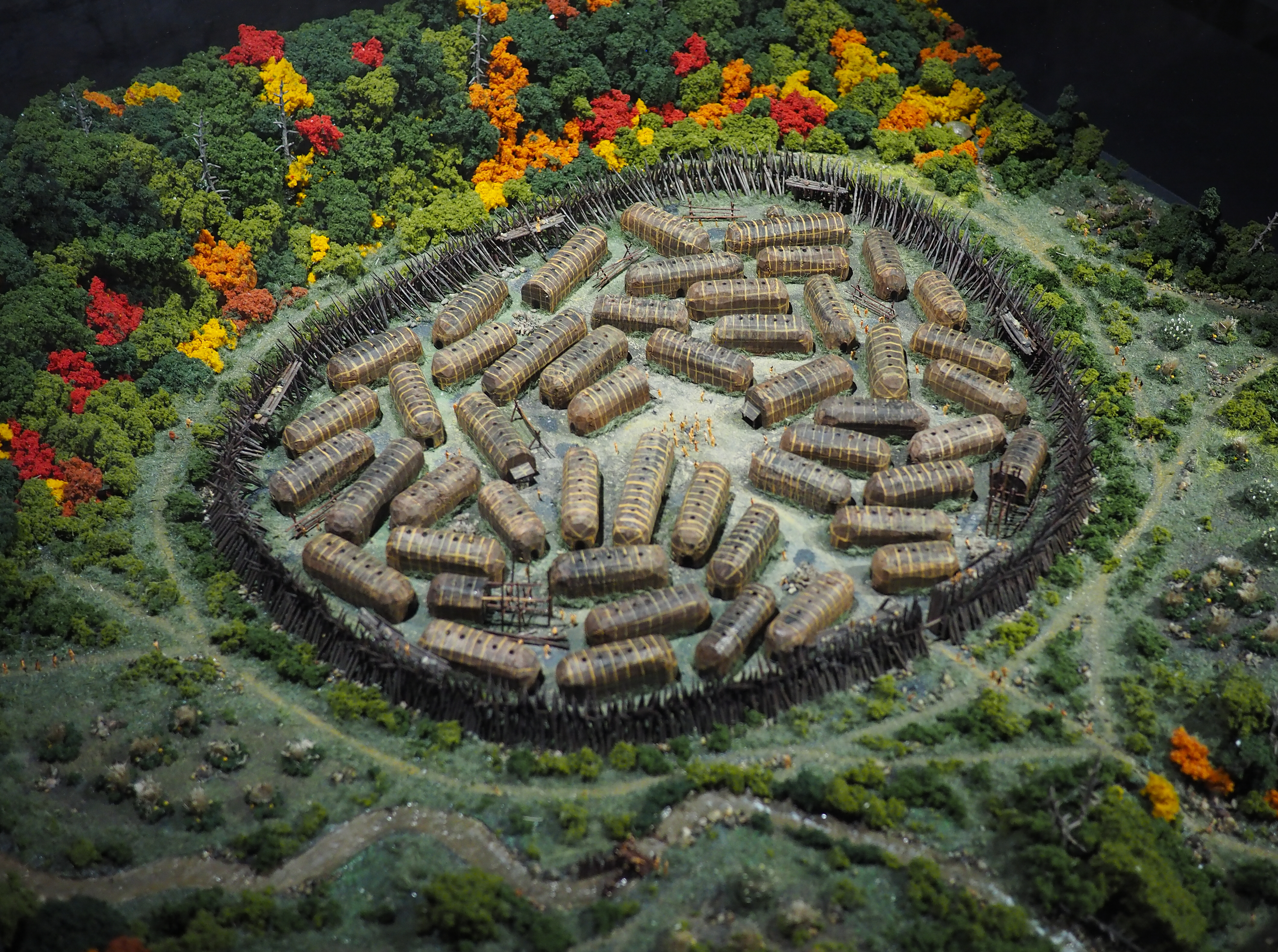
- Model of the Iroquoian village of Hochelaga, from the descriptions of Jacques Cartier and other Quebec archaeological sites.
- Interactive map of Hochelaga
- Coordinates: 45°30′N 73°40′W
- Country: Canada
- Province: Quebec
- Region: Montreal
- Established: ?
- Dissolved: 16th century
- Highest elevation: 233 m (764 ft)
- Lowest elevation: 6 m (20 ft)
- Time zone: UTC−5 (EST)
  - Summer (DST): UTC−4 (EDT)

National Historic Site of Canada
- Official name: Hochelaga National Historic Site of Canada
- Designated: 1920

Hochelaga (French pronunciation: [ɔʃlaɡa]) was a St. Lawrence Iroquoian 16th century fortified village on or near Mount Royal in present-day Montreal, Quebec, Canada. St. Lawrence Iroquoians are a distinct group of semi sedentary Indigenous farmers who spoke a Laurentian Iroquoian language and lived along the St. Lawrence River before disappearing around 1600. Jacques Cartier arrived by boat on October 2, 1535; he visited the village on the following day. He was greeted well by the Iroquois, and named the mountain he saw nearby Mount Royal. Several names in and around Montreal and the Hochelaga Archipelago can be traced back to him.

A stone marker commemorating the former village was placed in 1925 on land adjacent to McGill University. It is believed to be in the vicinity of the village visited by Cartier in 1535. The site of the marker is designated a National Historic Site of Canada.

The name of the village survives in Hochelaga-Maisonneuve, the name of a neighbourhood of Montreal, as well as through Kingston's Hochelaga Inn, a historic building once owned by the Bank of Montreal. A variant spelling survives in Montreal's contemporary Osheaga Festival.

== Etymology ==
Most linguists accept the word Hochelaga as a French borrowing of an Iroquoian term – either osekare, meaning "beaver path" or "beaver dam", or osheaga, meaning "big rapids", in reference to the nearby Lachine Rapids. An alternative explanation has been proposed in which osheaga means "people of the shaking hands"; in some versions of this story, the Iroquoian people were bewildered by Cartier waving his hands wildly to attract their attention as he first approached the settlement in his boat, while in others, they were bewildered by his European custom of greeting them with a handshake. These latter explanations are favoured by the Mohawk people further upriver at Kahnawake, but are not easily supported by the Mohawk language's significant dissimilarities from what is known of the related but not identical Laurentian language, which was spoken by the Iroquoian people at Hochelaga.

== Location ==
The original documentation that describes the village’s location is Bref récit et succincte narration de la navigation faite en MDXXXV et MDXXXVI, which Cartier gave to King Francis I of France in 1545. A plan exists titled La Terra de Hochelaga nella Nova Francia, which illustrates, in the European manner of the period, Cartier's original visit. Giacomo Gastaldi illustrated Hochelaga in the third volume of Delle navigationi et viaggi, a work done in Venice between 1550 and 1556 by Giovanni Battista Ramusio. The perfect, regular arrangement of the houses, conforming to the urban ideal of the Italian Renaissance, as well as the boards covering the village's palisade, were probably his own fabrications. If the plan faithfully illustrates the notes of the French explorer, it offers little resemblance to ethnohistorical reality. A reproduction of La Terra de Hochelaga by Paul-Émile Borduas decorates the walls of the Grand Chalet of Mount Royal Park.

The town, surrounded by a wooden palisade, had around fifty houses made of wood and bark, mostly longhouses, both rectangular and rounded. the population is estimated to have been approximately 3,000 inhabitants. It was doubtlessly destroyed afterwards, as it was not mentioned by Jacques Cartier on his return visit to the island in 1541. He spoke about two villages, but only one, Tutonaguy, was named. War, possibly with Stadacona, has been suggested to be the cause of the disappearance of Hochelaga. The inhabitants' disappearance has spawned several theories, including their migration westward toward the shores of the Great Lakes, devastating wars with the Iroquois tribes to the south or the Hurons to the west, or the impact of Old World diseases. However, according to Archéobec, the abandonment of the village following a cycle of land exhaustion would have been the main reason. At the time of Samuel de Champlain's arrival, both Algonquins and Mohawks hunted in the Saint Lawrence Valley and conducted raids, but neither had founded any permanent settlements.

The custom of moving villages is a possible explanation as to why the exact location of the Iroquois settlement remains a mystery in the present day, despite the numerous hypotheses that locate it close to Mount Royal. William Douw Lighthall maintained that Hochelaga was located at the Dawson site, discovered in 1860 close to McGill University. The site appears to correspond to a village preceding the foundation of Ville-Marie by one or two centuries, but which lacked a palisade and seemed to be too cramped. Another proposed location is Outremont, north of the mountain, which would be more likely if Cartier had arrived via the Rivière des Prairies. The urbanist Pierre Larouche, based on the topometric data deduced from the Gastaldi illustration, has proposed that the village was situated on the summit of the mountain. This hypothesis is not well-supported, as La Terra de Hochelaga is a second-hand reconstruction. Furthermore, Cartier states clearly that the mountain was "adjacent to their said village", that Hochelaga was "close to and adjoining a mountain", and that he went to Mount Royal a distance of a quarter-league of the site, the distance that, in fact, separates the basin of Mount Royal from the surrounding hills dominating it. Archaeological excavations undertaken recently on the summit of the mountain, around the basin, and in the Jeanne-Mance Park east of Mount Royal have come up empty. The exact location of Hochelaga remains unknown.

== European contact ==
=== Future site of Montreal ===
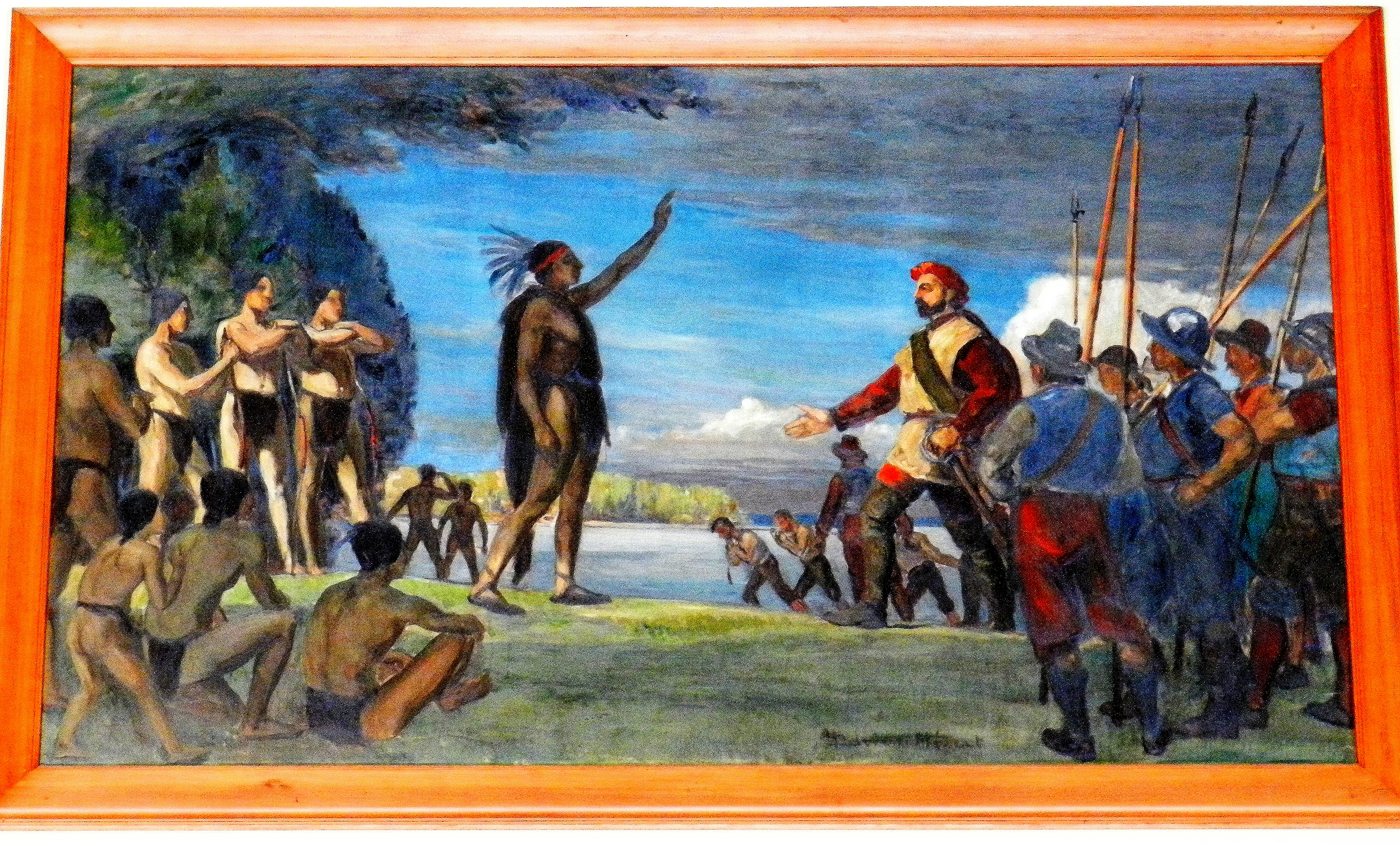
Painting by Adrien Hébert representing Jacques Cartier meeting the Iroquois. The Iroquois chief raises his arm as a sign of welcome, while Cartier responds by raising his own slightly while keeping the other hand on his sword.

The arrival of Jacques Cartier in Hochelaga in 1535, at the foot of what is now known as Mount Royal, was an episode especially consequential to the history of New France in his three exploration voyages to the West Indies. Under a mandate from King Francis I to find a waterway to Cathay (China) and to Cipango (Japan), he reached Stadacona (the future site of Québec City) at the end of the summer of 1535. Encouraged, he quickly continued further into the interior, but the rapids surrounding what is now the Island of Montreal blocked his route. He would then visit Hochelaga, which he described in Bref récit, a brief account of his second voyage to the Saint Lawrence Valley. In 1611, the European explorer Samuel de Champlain visited the area. In 1642, the village of Ville-Marie was founded by Paul de Chomedey, Sieur de Maisonneuve, but the inhabitants gradually dropped that name, preferring to use instead the name of the island upon which the colony was established, Montreal, a toponym derived from mont royal, the French name of Mount Royal.

=== Entering via the Rivière des Prairies ===
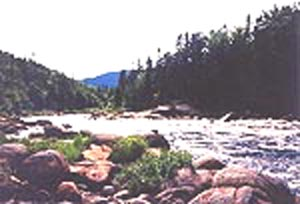
Rivière des Prairies

For a long time, it was considered obvious that Jacques Cartier had continuously followed the Saint Lawrence River; the rapids he mentioned were identified as the Lachine Rapids. Some think his description better corresponds to the rapids in the Rivière des Prairies at Sault-au-Récollet. Close examination of historical documentation in the 20th century raised the possibility that before the European arrival, the Rivière des Prairies was the usual waterway used by the indigenous tribes, as it was much less dangerous than the Saint Lawrence River with its rapids. It constituted a more direct waterway connecting to the upstream Rivière des Outaouais. Therefore, it is possible that Cartier traveled to Hochelaga via this river. Furthermore, the three rapids described by Cartier on a subsequent expedition are easier to locate on the Rivière des Prairies, the so-called "river of three saults", than on the Saint Lawrence River. Aristide Beaugrand-Champagne, the architect of the Grand Chalet of Mount Royal Park, wrote in detail about this.

=== Reception by the Hochelagans ===
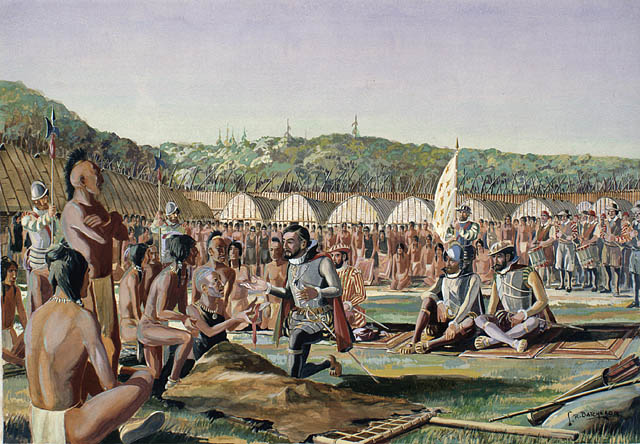
Watercolour showing Jacques Cartier visiting the village of Hochelaga on 3 October 1535 (Lawrence Batchelor; circa 1933).

On 2 October 1535 (491 years ago), Jacques Cartier and his troops arrived in the vicinity of Hochelaga. As night fell, he withdrew with his men aboard the boats. Early on the morning of October 3, along with his men and twenty marines, he undertook on foot the worn path to Hochelaga. After walking about two leagues, approximately 6 miles (9.7 km), he saw the village surrounded by hills and cultivated fields of corn. This appeared to him much more impressive than Stadacona:

"And here within the countryside is situated and sits the said town of Hochelaga, near and joining a mountain that is, around it, ploughed and very fertile, from on top of which one can see very far."

Cartier declared that the mountain would be named Mount Royal, in honour of King Francis I of France, as was customary in that period. He then visited Hochelaga, and noted its organization, giving a detailed description of the interior of a longhouse and how people lived in it:

"The said town is all in a circle, enclosed in wood, in three ranks, in the manner of a pyramid, crossed at the top, having a row perpendicular to it all. And this town there is only one door and entrance. There are within this town roughly fifty houses, each about fifty steps long, and in each one of them, there are several hearths and several rooms."

In the center of each house was a common room, where the indigenous people built a fire and lived as a community.

When the tour of the village was over, Cartier and his companions were then guided up Mount Royal, probably on the back of a man, according to a custom of courtesy he mentions further down. The mountain was "distant from the village by about a quarter-league". Once atop the summit of one of the hills comprising the mount, Cartier declared:

"We can see the said river, other than where we left our barques, where there is a rapid, the most impetuous it is given to see, one which is not possible for us to pass."

Once the visit was over, Cartier and his men returned to their boats:

"We withdrew to our boats, not without a great number of the said people, a part of which, that when they saw our people tired, took them upon themselves, as on a horse, and carried them."

Cartier's description suggests that the village of Hochelaga was linked to the occupation of the area by the St. Lawrence Iroquoians, a group of Indigenous sedentary farmers who inhabited the St. Lawrence Valley between 1200 and 1600 CE.

== Venetian interest ==
Map titled La Terra De Hochelaga Nella Nova Francia, with on the left, theMonte Real, plan drawn by Giacomo Gastaldi in illustration of the book Delle Navigationi et viaggi, (Venice, 1556).

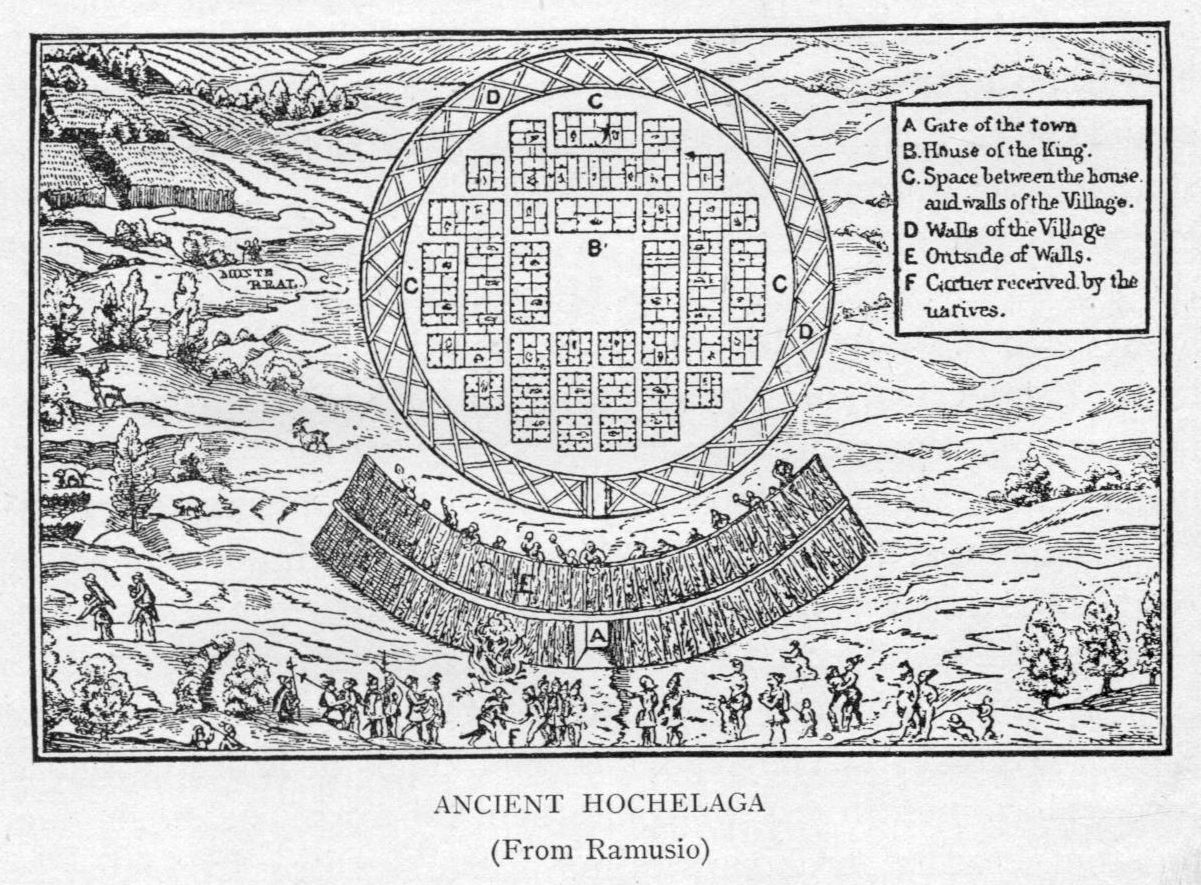
Modified reproduction, with English legend, of La Terra de Hochelaga Nella Nova Francia (1909)

Jacques Cartier's exploration of the West Indies did not go unnoticed in Venice, in particular by Giovanni Battista Ramusio, statesman and secretary of the Council of Ten. A career diplomat, his role as ambassador brought him to numerous European countries. Ramusio, who was seven when the Genovese Christopher Columbus reached the Americas in 1492, considered the discovery of new lands as being the most important undertaking of the time. In effect, the republic was facing a grave problem accessing the Indian subcontinent, since the Ottoman Turks had taken Constantinople in 1453. Ramusio obtained a copy of Bref récit, a memoir that Jacques Cartier had given to King Francis I of France in 1545, and subsequently proceeded to describe Cartier's explorations in the third volume of his work, Delle navigationi et viaggi. The 1556 edition contains assorted illustrations by Giacomo Gastaldi, including La Terra de Hochelaga Nella Nova Francia, describing Cartier's visit on Mount Royal (Monte Real on the map) in the European style of the time.

== In the arts ==
One of the paintings in the Mount Royal Chalet is a reproduction of La Terra de Hochelaga by Paul-Émile Borduas, a member of the Refus Global.

The film Hochelaga, Land of Souls (2017) depicts the arrival of the Cartier expedition at Hochelaga, as well as another fictionalized events occurring at the site of the village over the centuries.

Hochelaga is the fourth album by the Canadian sludge metal band Dopethrone. It was released on April 13, 2015 on Totem Cat Records.

== See also ==
- St. Lawrence Iroquoians
- History of Montreal
- Stadacona

== Bibliography and sources ==
- Cartier, Jacques. (1545). Relation originale de Jacques Cartier. Paris: Tross (1863 version, in French).
- Newton, Mark. (2007). "Where was Hochelaga?", Canadian Geographic. Volume 114, numéro 6. Pages 63–68.
- Pendergast, James F. (1998). "The Confusing Identities Attributed to Stadacona and Hochelaga", Revue d'études canadiennes. Volume 32. Pages 149–167.
- Pendergast, James F. et Bruce G. Trigger. (1972). Cartier's Hochelaga and the Dawson Site. Montreal: McGill-Queen's University Press. ISBN 978-0-7735-0070-9
- Mark Abley. (1994). "Where was Hochelaga?", Canadian Geographic. Volume 114, numéro 6. Pages 63–68.
- Roland Tremblay. (2006). "Les Iroquoiens du Saint-Laurent: peuple du maïs". Montréal: Éditions de l'Homme.
