= Stadacona =

- Village
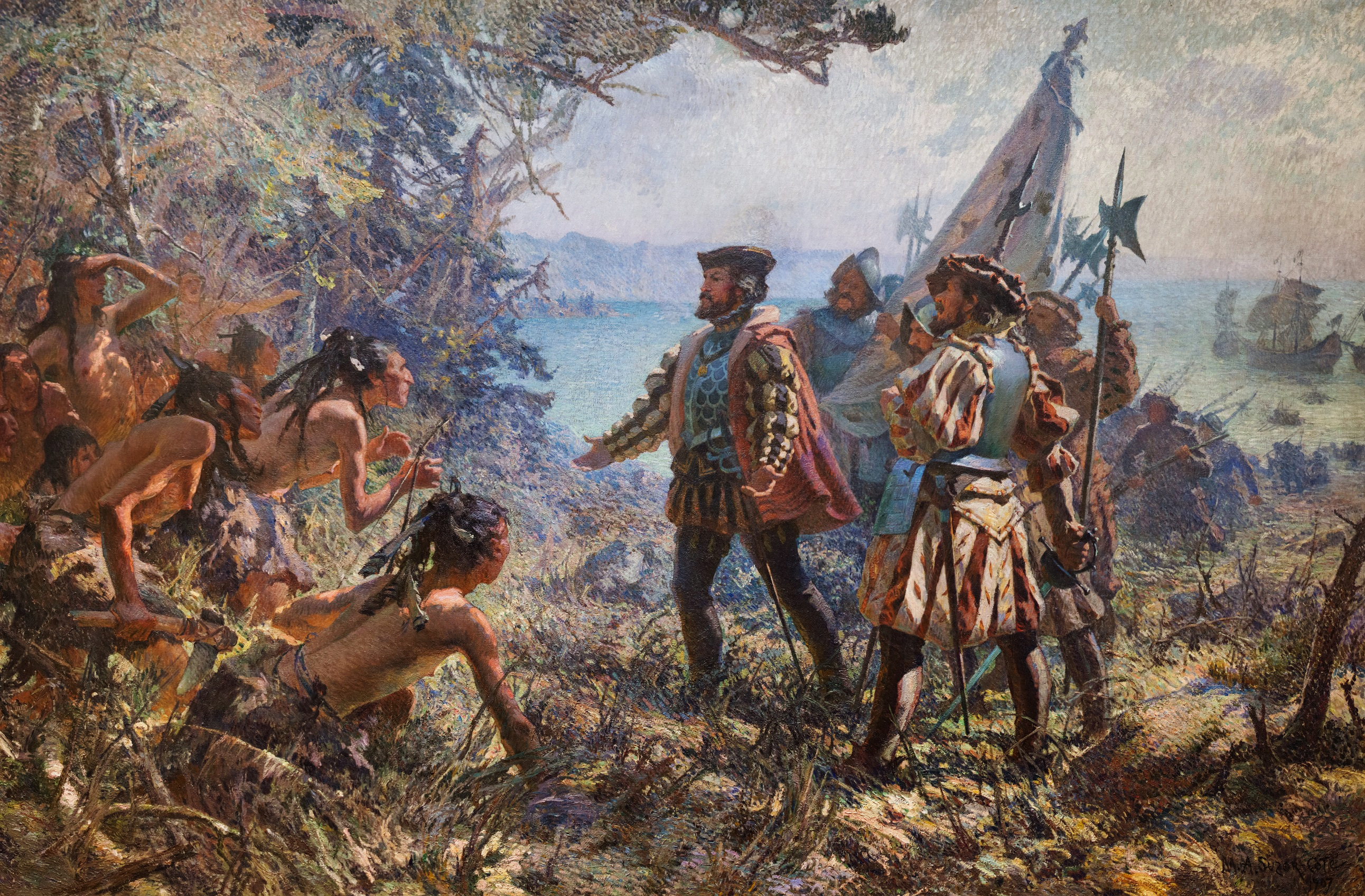
- Jacques Cartier meeting the Indians at Stadacona in 1535, by Marc-Aurèle de Foy Suzor-Coté (1907)
- Interactive map of Stadacona
- Coordinates: 46.82444°N 71.24344°W, present-day Québec City

Stadacona was a 16th-century St. Lawrence Iroquoian village not far from where Quebec City was founded in 1608. It was the site of the first attempted permanent settlement by French colonists in New France and played an important role in the early exploration of Quebec.

The name Canada, borrowed by Jacques Cartier to designate the country around Stadaconé and the similar village of Hochelaga as well as the Saint Lawrence River (rivière de Canada), comes from the Iroquoian language, in which the word meant "town". No archaeological trace of Stadacona has been found, so its precise location remains unknown to this day. It is assumed that it was located near the confluence of the Saint Lawrence and the Saint-Charles River in what is now the Vieux-Limoilou district of Quebec City.

== History ==
French explorer and navigator Jacques Cartier, while travelling and charting the Saint Lawrence River, reached the village of Stadacona in July 1534. At the time, the village chief was Donnacona, who showed Cartier five scalps taken in their war with the Toudaman (likely the Miꞌkmaq), a neighbouring people who had attacked one of their forts the previous spring, killing 200 inhabitants. Despite efforts by the people of the village, Cartier seized some inhabitants and their chief, but later released Donnacona, who agreed for his two sons, Taignoagny and Domagaya, to return with Cartier to France for a year.

Cartier returned to Stadacona with Donnacona's sons on his next voyage in 1535–1536, where he recorded a word they had used to refer to their home: "They call a town, Kanata" (Canada). Cartier continued up the Saint Lawrence River to Hochelaga despite resistance from Stadaconans who would have preferred to retain a trading monopoly in European metal goods for the upstream tribes.

When he and his crew returned to stay over the winter, they were effectively saved by the Stadaconans, who knew how to prepare for them a Vitamin C-rich broth as a cure for scurvy that had developed among Cartier's crew, killing a quarter of them. The same winter, more than 50 Iroquois of the village died from viral and bacterial diseases carried by the Europeans. After this, Cartier seized Donnacona, his sons, and seven other inhabitants, and took them back to France, where nine of the ten died. None ever returned. Five years later, Cartier came back to Stadacona in 1543 to find the village abandoned and destroyed by an unknown enemy, likely due to devastating wars by the Mohawk of the Iroquois or Haudenosaunee confederacy (Five Nations) to the south situated near Lake Ontario.

Samuel de Champlain later chose the location of the village to establish the colony of l'Habitation, which eventually grew into the city of Québec.

== See also ==
- Donnacona
- Jacques Cartier
- History of Quebec City
- St. Lawrence Iroquoians
- Hochelaga (village)
