= 1748 in Canada =

- Decades: 1720s; 1730s; 1740s; 1750s; 1760s
- See also: History of Canada; Timeline of Canadian history; List of years in Canada

Events from the year 1748 in Canada.

== Incumbents ==
- French Monarch: Louis XV
- British and Irish Monarch: George II

=== Governors ===
- Governor General of New France: Roland-Michel Barrin de La Galissonière
- Colonial Governor of Louisiana: Pierre de Rigaud, Marquis de Vaudreuil-Cavagnial
- Governor of Nova Scotia: Paul Mascarene
- Commodore-Governor of Newfoundland: Charles Watson

== Events ==
- Treaty of Aix-la-Chapelle returns Ile Royale, (Cape Breton Island) Ile Saint-Jean, (Prince Edward Island) and Louisbourg to France.
- Treaty of Logstown (English with Shawnee, Delaware, Wyandot). English later base their claim to the whole Great Lakes and midwest (or Old Northwest as it was later called) on these two treaties.

== Births ==
- June 14: Henry Allen, evangelist, hymnist, theologian (d.1784)

=== Full date unknown ===
- James Henry Craig, officer, colonial administrator (d.1812)

== Deaths ==
- August 12: Jean Jeantot, Canadian Catholic brother and schoolmaster (born c. 1666)

=== Full date unknown ===
- Agathe de Repentigny, pioneering businesswoman in New France. (born c. 1657)
