= 1749 in Canada =

- Decades: 1720s; 1730s; 1740s; 1750s; 1760s
- See also: History of Canada; Timeline of Canadian history; List of years in Canada

Events from the year 1749 in Canada.

== Incumbents ==
- French Monarch: Louis XV
- British and Irish Monarch: George II

=== Governors ===
- Governor General of New France: Roland-Michel Barrin de La Galissonière then Jacques-Pierre de Taffanel de la Jonquière, Marquis de la Jonquière
- Colonial Governor of Louisiana: Pierre de Rigaud, Marquis de Vaudreuil-Cavagnial
- Governor of Nova Scotia: Edward Cornwallis
- Commodore-Governor of Newfoundland: George Brydges Rodney

== Events ==
- Halifax, capital of Nova Scotia, is founded by British General Edward Cornwallis to counter French presence at Louisbourg.
- La Vérendrye was awarded the cross of Saint Louis, in honour of his career.
- French agricultural settlement established in what would become Windsor, Ontario.

== Births ==
=== Full date unknown ===
- Joel Stone, founder of Gananoque, Ontario (died 1833)

== Deaths ==
- December 5 - Pierre Gaultier de Varennes, sieur de La Vérendrye, French Canadian military officer, fur trader and explorer (born 1685).
