= 1746 in Canada =

- Decades: 1720s; 1730s; 1740s; 1750s; 1760s
- See also: History of Canada; Timeline of Canadian history; List of years in Canada

Events from the year 1746 in Canada.

== Incumbents ==
- French Monarch: Louis XV
- British and Irish Monarch: George II

=== Governors ===
- Governor General of New France: Charles de la Boische, Marquis de Beauharnois
- Colonial Governor of Louisiana: Pierre de Rigaud, Marquis de Vaudreuil-Cavagnial
- Governor of Nova Scotia: Paul Mascarene
- Commodore-Governor of Newfoundland: James Douglas

== Events ==
- Typhoid fever epidemic breaks out among the Micmac of Nova Scotia.
- August 30: Duc d'Anville Expedition, led by a French aristocrat, arrives at Chebucto (now Halifax Harbour) with 13,000 men in 70 ships. His orders from the King of France: Expel the British from Nova Scotia, then burn Boston and sack New England. Disease and dissension within the command structure defeats d'Anville's force, which despite its formidable strength has no discernible effect on the course of events in North America.
- October: Fortress Louisbourg and l'Ile-Royale are returned to France by the Treaty of Aix-La-Chapelle.
- Jacques-Pierre de Taffanel de la Jonquière, Marquis de la Jonquière was appointed governor general of New France on March 1, 1746, (b April 18, 1685 – d March 17, 1752)
