= 1744 in Canada =

- Decades: 1720s; 1730s; 1740s; 1750s; 1760s
- See also: History of Canada; Timeline of Canadian history; List of years in Canada

Events from the year 1744 in Canada.

== Incumbents ==
- French Monarch: Louis XV
- British and Irish Monarch: George II

=== Governors ===
- Governor General of New France: Charles de la Boische, Marquis de Beauharnois
- Colonial Governor of Louisiana: Pierre de Rigaud, Marquis de Vaudreuil-Cavagnial
- Governor of Nova Scotia: Paul Mascarene
- Commodore-Governor of Newfoundland: Thomas Smith

== Events ==
- May 3 – News of the declaration of war by France on Great Britain arrives in New France, starting King George's War.
- The Treaty of Lancaster between Great Britain and the Iroquois occurs.
- Nicolas-Joseph de Noyelles de Fleurimont succeeded Pierre Gaultier de Varennes et de La Vérendrye as the Commandant of the western French forts.

== Births ==
- May 22 - Juan Francisco de la Bodega y Quadra, naval officer, explorer, administrator (d.1794)
- October 6 - James McGill, merchant, philanthropist (d.1813)
- December 10 - William Berczy, painter, architect, author, and colonizer (d.1813)

=== Full date unknown ===
- Elias Hardy, lawyer and office-holder (d.1798)
