= 1754 in Canada =

- Decades: 1730s; 1740s; 1750s; 1760s; 1770s
- See also: History of Canada; Timeline of Canadian history; List of years in Canada

Events from the year 1754 in Canada.

== Incumbents ==
- French Monarch: Louis XV
- British and Irish Monarch: George II

=== Governors ===
- Governor General of New France: Michel-Ange Duquesne de Menneville
- Colonial Governor of Louisiana: Louis Billouart
- Governor of Nova Scotia: Peregrine Hopson
- Commodore-Governor of Newfoundland: Hugh Bonfoy

== Events ==
- 1754–63 - French and Indian War (the colonial phase of Europe's Seven Years' War)
- Anthony Henday travels west from Hudson Bay onto Plains, meets natives on horseback and sees Rocky Mountains.
- French and Indian War begins in North America; it becomes the Seven Years' War when fighting spreads to Europe (1756).
- Hudson's Bay Company Anthony Hendry travels to upper South Saskatchewan River, to Ft. La Jonquiere region with presents and trade goods.
- France sends 3,000 regulars to Canada. Fort Duquesne is built. Benjamin Franklin says the British Colonies will have no peace while France holds Canada. Ango-French competition in the Ohio Valley sparks conflict.
- George Washington's troops at Fort Duquesne open the French and Indian War, a counterpart of the Seven Years' War in Europe.
- Tuesday May 28: Washington, with a few men, attacks Jumonville, with thirty followers, near the confluence of the Monongahela and Ohio Rivers. Jumonville and nine of his command are killed. The rest are taken, prisoners. The French allege that, before the firing began, Jumonville signaled that he had a proposal to make; but Washington says that he observed no signal.

== Births ==
- March - William Osgoode, judge (died 1824)
- June 1 - John Saunders, soldier, lawyer, politician and Chief Justice of New Brunswick (died 1834)
- July 30 - Ward Chipman, lawyer, public servant, politician (died 1824)
- November 5 - Alessandro Malaspina, explorer (died 1810)

== Deaths ==
- May 28 - Joseph Coulon de Jumonville, military officer. (born 1718)
