= 1747 in Canada =

- Decades: 1720s; 1730s; 1740s; 1750s; 1760s
- See also: History of Canada; Timeline of Canadian history; List of years in Canada

Events from the year 1747 in Canada.

== Incumbents ==
- French Monarch: Louis XV
- British and Irish Monarch: George II

=== Governors ===
- Governor General of New France: Charles de la Boische, Marquis de Beauharnois then Roland-Michel Barrin de La Galissonière
- Colonial Governor of Louisiana: Pierre de Rigaud, Marquis de Vaudreuil-Cavagnial
- Governor of Nova Scotia: Paul Mascarene
- Commodore-Governor of Newfoundland: James Douglas Bt

== Events ==
- 11 February – At the Battle of Grand Pré, Col. Arthur Noble's detachment of British troops from Massachusetts, face off against a French and Mi'kmaq force under Nicholas Antoine Coulon de Villiers. Noble and around 70 of his soldiers were killed.
- Marguerite d'Youville (Born Varennes, Quebec October 1701 Died December 28, 1771) founds the Sisters of Charity or the Grey Nuns of Montreal.
- Roland-Michel Barrin de La Galissonière was appointed to be Governor of New France.

== Births ==
- Sir John Thomas Duckworth, a naval officer who became the governor of Newfoundland: February 9, 1747 (England) - Aug 31, 1817.
- Samuel Gale, a surveyor and land agent in Lower Canada (Quebec): born in England Oct 14, 1747.

== Deaths ==
- January 18: Michel Bégon, commissary of the Marine, councillor in the parlement of Metz, France, inspector general of the Marine, intendant of New France, intendant of Le Havre, of the admiralty of Normandy, and of naval forces (b.1667)
- August 8: Madeleine de Verchères, daughter of François Jarret, a seigneur in New France, and Marie Perrot (b.1678); Madeline (alt spelling) achieved recognition when, as a young girl, she successfully fought off Iroquois attackers and helped to save Fort Vercheres (Quebec).
