= 1756 in Canada =

- Decades: 1730s; 1740s; 1750s; 1760s; 1770s
- See also: History of Canada; Timeline of Canadian history; List of years in Canada

Events from the year 1756 in Canada.

== Incumbents ==
- French Monarch: Louis XV
- British and Irish Monarch: George II

=== Governors ===
- Governor General of New France: Michel-Ange Duquesne de Menneville
- Colonial Governor of Louisiana: Louis Billouart
- Governor of Nova Scotia: Peregrine Hopson
- Commodore-Governor of Newfoundland: Richard Dorrill

== Events ==
- France sends two battalions to Canada, with provisions, and 1,300,000 livres, in specie, which has the effect of depreciating the paper currency by 25 per cent.
- March - A Canadien force of 300 captures Fort Bull, between Schenectady and Oswego, and puts the garrison to the sword.
- May - Montcalm reaches Quebec with 1,400 soldiers.
- The Canadiens, suffering from smallpox and famine, are burthened with the support of their Indian allies.
- Saturday August 14 - Though opposed to attacking any British fort, Montcalm, at the head of 3,100 regulars, Canadiens and Indians, captures Fort Oswego, - a success attributable, mainly, to his intercepting a message to General Webb, commanding 2,000 men in the vicinity. Colonel Mercer is killed. The garrison (1,780) and about 100 women and children are taken prisoners.
- The Marquis de Montcalm assumes a troubled command of French troops in North America. (The Seven Years' War between Britain and France begins in Europe).

== Births ==
- Jean François Hamtramck, French Canadian officer that joined American revolution.
