= 1755 in Canada =

- Decades: 1730s; 1740s; 1750s; 1760s; 1770s
- See also: History of Canada; Timeline of Canadian history; List of years in Canada

Events from the year 1755 in Canada.

== Incumbents ==
- French Monarch: Louis XV
- British and Irish Monarch: George II

=== Governors ===
- Governor General of New France: Michel-Ange Duquesne de Menneville
- Colonial Governor of Louisiana: Louis Billouart
- Governor of Nova Scotia: Peregrine Hopson
- Commodore-Governor of Newfoundland: Hugh Bonfoy

== Events ==
- 1755-75 - William Johnson, British superintendent of Indian affairs in the northern colonies, persuades the Iroquois League to break its neutrality and side with England against France.
- June 16 - Fort Beausejour, garrisoned by 400 Frenchmen, is surrendered to Col. Winslow, of Massachusetts, commanding 2,300, of whom 300 are regulars.
- July: Seven British Colonial Governors form a Treaty with the Iroquois, and project a federal union for carrying on war, under a president to be named by the King.
- July 15 - Announcement, in England, of the capture of French troops on their way to Canada.
- September 8 - Baron Dieskay, with 1,500 French and Indian troops, overcomes Col. Williams, with 1,400 English and Indians, near Fort George. Immediately afterwards, the French attack Col. Johnson's force, barricaded at Fort George, but are repelled, with heavy loss. The two commanders are wounded, and the two opposing Indian chiefs are killed. Baron Dieskay is captured by the English, who dress his wounds and earn his lifelong gratitude by their kindness.
- For his success at Fort George, Col. Johnson is made a baronet, with a grant of 5,000 pounds.
- The Great Expulsion begins. English Expulsion of the French Acadians—who lived and intermarried with Nova Scotia and Cape Breton Mi'kmaqs (many of whom were also taken). Forcibly loaded into ships and deposited randomly along the southern (now American) coasts, many (probably 1/3 to 1/2) died. Some are ancestors of the Cajuns of Louisiana, and a few made their ways back home. Acadians were idealists, hostile to King and Church authority, who lived in peace with the Mi'kmaqs. Neither the French rulers nor the English wanted them.

== Deaths ==
- September 13 - Pierre Gaultier de La Vérendrye, explorer (born 1714)
