= 1752 in Canada =

- Decades: 1730s; 1740s; 1750s; 1760s; 1770s
- See also: History of Canada; Timeline of Canadian history; List of years in Canada

Events from the year 1752 in Canada.

== Incumbents ==
- French Monarch: Louis XV
- British and Irish Monarch: George II

=== Governors ===
- Governor General of New France: Jacques-Pierre de Taffanel de la Jonquière, Marquis de la Jonquière then Michel-Ange Duquesne de Menneville
- Colonial Governor of Louisiana: Pierre de Rigaud, Marquis de Vaudreuil-Cavagnial
- Governor of Nova Scotia: Edward Cornwallis
- Commodore-Governor of Newfoundland: Francis William Drake

== Events ==
- 23 March – Canada's first newspaper, the weekly Halifax Gazette, is published.
- French kill Miami chief, fortify the Ohio Valley region with forts from Lake Erie to the forks of the Ohio River.
- La Corne began a three-year appointment as the western commander of the poste de l'Ouest.
- The British Empire adopts the Gregorian calendar.

== Births ==
- 25 February – John Graves Simcoe, first lieutenant governor of Upper Canada (d.1806)

== Deaths ==
- Jacques-Pierre de Taffanel de la Jonquière, Marquis de la Jonquière, governor general of New France, on 17 March (born 1685)
