= 1753 in Canada =

- Decades: 1730s; 1740s; 1750s; 1760s; 1770s
- See also: History of Canada; Timeline of Canadian history; List of years in Canada

Events from the year 1753 in Canada.

== Incumbents ==
- French Monarch: Louis XV
- British and Irish Monarch: George II

=== Governors ===
- Governor General of New France: Michel-Ange Duquesne de Menneville
- Colonial Governor of Louisiana: Pierre de Rigaud, Marquis de Vaudreuil-Cavagnial then Louis Billouart
- Governor of Nova Scotia: Peregrine Hopson
- Commodore-Governor of Newfoundland: Hugh Bonfoy

== Events ==
- The 2nd Fort Paskoya built at a new location which became the Pas.
- A trading post, to be later known as Fort de la Corne was built just below the junction of the two branches of the Saskatchewan.
- Fort Rouge rebuilt by Jacques Legardeur de Saint-Pierre at its original location.

== Deaths ==
- October 17 - François-Josué de la Corne Dubreuil, a soldier and trader. (born 1710)
