= 1745 in Canada =

- Decades: 1720s; 1730s; 1740s; 1750s; 1760s
- See also: History of Canada; Timeline of Canadian history; List of years in Canada

Events from the year 1745 in Canada.

== Incumbents ==
- French Monarch: Louis XV
- British and Irish Monarch: George II

=== Governors ===
- Governor General of New France: Charles de la Boische, Marquis de Beauharnois
- Colonial Governor of Louisiana: Pierre de Rigaud, Marquis de Vaudreuil-Cavagnial
- Governor of Nova Scotia: Paul Mascarene
- Commodore-Governor of Newfoundland: Richard Edwards

== Events ==
- 16 June 1745 - After a six-week siege, the French fort of Louisbourg on Cape Breton Island falls to the British colonial forces from New England organized by Governor William Shirley. This intensifies hostilities in what is known as King George's War, an extension of the European War of the Austrian Succession. The English go on to make new conquests from the French in the West Indies.

== Births ==
- Samuel Hearne, explorer, fur-trader, author, and naturalist (died 1792)
