= 1751 in Canada =

- Decades: 1730s; 1740s; 1750s; 1760s; 1770s
- See also: History of Canada; Timeline of Canadian history; List of years in Canada

This article lists information about events from the year 1751 in Canada.

== Incumbents ==
- French Monarch: Louis XV
- British and Irish Monarch: George II

=== Governors ===
- Governor General of New France: Jacques-Pierre de Taffanel de la Jonquière, Marquis de la Jonquière
- Colonial Governor of Louisiana: Pierre de Rigaud, Marquis de Vaudreuil-Cavagnial
- Governor of Nova Scotia: Edward Cornwallis
- Commodore-Governor of Newfoundland: Francis William Drake

== Events ==
- Fort La Jonquière was established in 1751 by Jacques Legardeur de Saint-Pierre on the Saskatchewan River (probably in the Nipawin, Sask. area).

== Births ==
- Philip Turnor, HBC inland surveyor (died 1799)
