= 1801 in Canada =

- Decades: 1780s; 1790s; 1800s; 1810s; 1820s
- See also: History of Canada; Timeline of Canadian history; List of years in Canada

Events from the year 1801 in Canada.

== Incumbents ==
- Monarch: George III

=== Federal government ===
- Parliament of Lower Canada: 3rd (starting January 8)
- Parliament of Upper Canada: 3rd (starting May 28)

=== Governors ===
- Governor of the Canadas: Robert Milnes
- Governor of New Brunswick: Thomas Carleton
- Governor of Nova Scotia: John Wentworth
- Commodore-Governor of Newfoundland: James Gambier
- Governor of St. John's Island: Edmund Fanning

== Events ==
- David Thompson fails to cross Rocky Mountains.
- Alexander Mackenzie's Voyages to the Frozen and Pacific Oceans published in London.
- Mackenzie knighted in honor of his explorations.
- Shipbuilding has become an important industry in Canada.
- Two ships, the Sarah and the Dove, arrive at Upper Canada carrying 700 passengers from Lochaber, Scotland from the Cameron and Fraser clans.
- Cassidy's Ltd. is established, third oldest company closed its doors in 2000

== Births ==
- January 18 – James Evans, missionary and linguist (d.1846)
- March 11 – William Henry Draper, politician, lawyer, and judge (d. 1877)
- May 31 – Robert Rankin, timber merchant and shipowner (d. 1870)

=== Full date unknown ===
- Edward Feild, Church of England clergyman, inspector of schools, bishop of Newfoundland (d.1876)
- Wilson Ruffin Abbott, businessman and landowner (d.1876)
- Shanawdithit, the last known survivor of the Beothuks (d.1829)

== Deaths ==
- December 28 – Samuel Holland, army officer, military engineer, surveyor, office holder, politician, and landowner (b.1728)

== Historical documents ==
Proclamation announces ceasefire in war between United Kingdom and France and requires return of vessels taken in following 5 months off North America

"The Admiralty Board has given orders for the general introduction of the cow pox into the Navy"

=== Lower Canada ===
Trois-Rivières wants to hire teacher and set up school to teach two "indispensably necessary" languages and "first principles" of sciences

New "Royal Institution for the Advancement of Learning" is to set up free school in any township or parish, with inhabitants providing schoolhouse

Gazette printer has for sale "the Encyclopedia Britannica, the latest edition, elegantly bound in Calf, gilt and lettered, price £40"

British society's awards to hemp growers in Lower Canada include first prize (gold medal or 50 guineas) for largest acreage of hemp production

Corporation is created to supply Montreal area "with good and wholesome Water," with penalties set for "annoying the water" in springs and reservoirs

Government may support by grants to religious communities foundlings and persons jobless by "a temporary or lasting derangement of intellect"

Because barring testimony from people who are third cousins or closer in relation often impedes civil justice, cousins-german is new such criterion

Call for contractors to build replacement bridge over Jacques-Cartier River, spanning 60 feet French and with 16 feet French width

Women guilty of high treason or of committing or counselling petit treason are to be hanged (instead of former penalty: death by burning)

Eighteen-year-old man kills woman and her daughter ("seven months gone with child by him") with axe; suffering 4 blows, daughter dies 2 days later

François Blanchet is elected to American Philosophical Society in Philadelphia along with two Swedish physicians and New York politician

"Wanted a young girl of about 13 or 14 years, belonging to English parents, to attend upon Children in a decent family"

Montreal's ancient and crumbling walls are to be replaced with streets, squares etc.

Trois-Rivières resident provides brief history of House of Brunswick-Lüneburg out of "profound respect due to His Majesty"

Cape Diamond Brewery can deliver porter, burton and mild ale and table and small beer in hogsheads and other barrel sizes

=== Upper Canada ===
Lt. Gov. Peter Hunter praises "zeal and liberality" of Assembly in promoting hemp cultivation, "so strongly recommended to us by our Parent State"

Same duties are to be paid for goods imported from U.S.A. as are charged on goods from Britain

For their "comfort" and "better regulation," no rum or spirits should be sold or bartered to "Moravian Indians" on Thames River (Orford Township)

Local authorities are to establish market in Kingston "where butchers meat, butter, eggs, poultry, fish, and vegetables shall be exposed to sale"

=== Nova Scotia ===
"Long wished-for [bank in Halifax] is pregnant with many advantages to the commercial interests of the Province"

Joint legislature committee's questionnaire collects information on Indigenous people "for us to form some plan for the settlement of the Indians"

"Engineers have been sent out to Halifax[...]to construct two docks in that port as speedily as possible for the reception of 74[-]gun ships"

Commissioners of poor in Halifax area are to keep males "picking oakum or rasping wood" and females making clothes, spinning, knitting, weaving etc.

Before their trial, father and son give their stories of events leading to death of Black woman Jude (and are acquitted of murder charge)

Slave owner sells for £39 "certain Negro boy named Jack [who was born in my house to parents who are] both my property"

John Wiswall writes to missionary society his plans for increasing glebe farm income by clearing more land and renting out projected house and barn

Woman's words of faith include "let us fear God for his power, trust him for his wisdom, love him for his goodness, praise him for his greatness[....]"

Simeon Perkins regrets departure of brother ("not very likely We Shall ever See each other again") and woman who nursed family through smallpox

Painting: view of Halifax

=== New Brunswick ===
Inflation's effect on middle class is especially hard on Loyalists with fixed incomes not increased since 1783 and only enough to barely feed families

Call for contractor(s) to deliver to Saint John harbour 300 masts (with no less than 22-inch diameters), yards and bowsprits in following May

Noille Bernard, Thomas Squatehan and 16 other Wolastoqiyik, "destitute of land," request land grant in Tobique-Restigouche area (note: "savages" used)

Request to Jonathan Odell to aid Indigenous people who are obstructed from travelling on Tabusintac River or fishing for salmon or eels on it

Odell orders removal of Little Southwest Miramichi River fish net harming Mi'kmaq (some of whom have "made considerable improvements as Planters")

If unable to support themselves, any jailed debtor may after 14 days apply to have their creditor provide them "weekly maintenance"

Saint John government authorized to put tax on dogs of no more than 5 shillings per year per dog to be "applied for the support of the Poor"

Armed brig sails to find French privateer, and it is "to the honor of the Inhabitants of this City" that so many quickly volunteered to be crew

Seamen of John Black & Co. of Saint John have deserted and $30 reward for each is offered to informant(s), whose names can be kept secret

New book of British American sacred music includes "principles of Vocal Music in a plain and concise manner" and psalm and hymn tunes

"Rags! Rags! Rags! Cash or Books given for clean Linen and Cotton Rags at [Gazette printer's] Office"

=== Western interior ===
Alexander Mackenzie says "very great and essential advantages may be derived by extending our trade from one sea to the other" (Note: "savage" used)

Map: Edition of Siksika chief Akutkomikimaan's map of Rocky Mountain Indigenous people that sketches their locations, mountains and rivers

=== Hudson's Bay Company ===
Kitternawaggan and brother bring Moose Factory more than 100 made beaver, having "dextriously evaded" Canadian traders on their way down river

Indigenous people add 11 deer to 2,000 lbs. of venison in store at York Factory; "I hope [it] will set want at defiance for this Winter"

York jobs include 11 men hunting and fishing, 15 men making firewood and timbers in woods, and 3 tailors making clothing for "English and Ind[ian]s"

=== Elsewhere ===
Canadians should try "the pure and free air of the United States" to escape "overbearing tyranny" in social class dominated Upper and Lower Canada

Thomas Jefferson and Aaron Burr, "decidedly attached to the present Republican government in France," are U.S. President and Vice President

William Henry Harrison tells Jefferson goods are brought from Canada via Illinois River into Louisiana and smuggled into U.S.A.

Detroit Moravian missionary says "no Indian understands (how) to trade" and explains how deals are affected by prices and grain pests

Certificate: Detroit Masonic lodge declares Master Mason William Shaw fit to join any Masonic body
