= 1750 in Canada =

- Decades: 1730s; 1740s; 1750s; 1760s; 1770s
- See also: History of Canada; Timeline of Canadian history; List of years in Canada

Events from the year 1750 in Canada.

== Incumbents ==
- French Monarch: Louis XV
- British and Irish Monarch: George II

=== Governors ===
- Governor General of New France: Jacques-Pierre de Taffanel de la Jonquière, Marquis de la Jonquière
- Colonial Governor of Louisiana: Pierre de Rigaud, Marquis de Vaudreuil-Cavagnial
- Governor of Nova Scotia: Edward Cornwallis
- Commodore-Governor of Newfoundland: Francis William Drake

== Events ==
- 1750s: Hudson's Bay Company Saskatchewan River region, reached by trade drummers sent out with goods to tempt the Indians to York.
- c. 1750: The Ojibwa begin to emerge as a distinct tribal amalgamation of smaller independent bands.
- German immigrants begin to arrive in numbers at Halifax.
- Hidatsa villages, site of ancient trading fair, now with both French and Hudson's Bay representatives present each summer.

== Births ==
- James Glenie, army officer, military engineer, businessman, office holder, and politician (d.1817)
- Simon McTavish, fur trader and dealer in furs, militia officer, office holder, landowner, seigneur, and businessman (d.1804)

== Deaths ==
- October 14: Richard Philipps, military officer, governor of Nova Scotia (b.1661)
