= 1741 in Canada =

- Decades: 1720s; 1730s; 1740s; 1750s; 1760s
- See also: History of Canada; Timeline of Canadian history; List of years in Canada

Events from the year 1741 in Canada.

== Incumbents ==
- French Monarch: Louis XV
- British and Irish Monarch: George II

=== Governors ===
- Governor General of New France: Charles de la Boische, Marquis de Beauharnois
- Colonial Governor of Louisiana: Jean-Baptiste Le Moyne de Bienville
- Governor of Nova Scotia: Paul Mascarene
- Commodore-Governor of Newfoundland: Henry Medley

== Events ==
- First Fort Dauphin, was built near Winnipegosis, Manitoba.
- Vitus Bering, in service of Russia, reaches Alaska; Russians soon trade with natives for sea otter pelts.
- Alexei Chirikof, with Bering expedition, sights land on July 15; the Europeans had found Alaska.
- Russians Vitus Bering and Aleksi Cherikov 'discover' Alaska and bring back fur skins (Bering shipwrecked on return and died); the Fur Rush is on.
- The lives of early Alaskans remained basically unchanged for thousands of years, until Russian sailors, led by Danish-born Russian explorer Vitus Bering, sighted Alaska's mainland in 1741.
- The Russians were soon followed by British, Spanish, and American adventurers. But it was the Russians who stayed to trade for the pelts of sea otters and other fur-bearing animals, interjecting their own culture and staking a strong claim on Alaska. Once the fur trade declined, however, the Russians lost interest in this beautiful though largely unexplored land.
- Fort Bourbon established near present-day Grand Rapids, Manitoba.
- François-Josué de la Corne Dubreuil appointed commandant at Fort Kaministiquia.

== Births ==
- 6 June - Denis Viger, businessman and politician
- 19 September - Jacob Jordan, businessman and politician
- 3 November - Joshua Upham, lawyer, judge and politician
- 6 November - Joseph-Laurent Bertrand, priest
