= Antoine Philippe =

Antoine Philippe is a combination of two French personal names. It is sometimes hyphenated.

- Antoine Philippe, Duke of Montpensier (1775–1807)
- Antoine Philippe de La Trémoïlle (1765–1794), French noble and royalist
- Antoine Philippe de Marigny de Mandeville (1722–1779), New Orléans explorer
