= 1798 in Canada =

- Decades: 1770s; 1780s; 1790s; 1800s; 1810s
- See also: History of Canada; Timeline of Canadian history; List of years in Canada

Events from the year 1798 in Canada.

== Incumbents ==
- Monarch: George III

=== Federal government ===
- Parliament of Lower Canada: 2nd
- Parliament of Upper Canada: 2nd

=== Governors ===
- Governor of the Canadas: Robert Prescott
- Governor of New Brunswick: Thomas Carleton
- Governor of Nova Scotia: John Wentworth
- Commodore-Governor of Newfoundland: John Elliot
- Governor of St. John's Island: Edmund Fanning
- Governor of Upper Canada: John Graves Simcoe

== Events ==
- David Thompson travels to Mandan villages and charts headwaters of Mississippi River.
- A new fur trading company is formed to compete with the North West Company. Confusingly called the New North West Company, it is nicknamed the XY Company later on.
- Indian chiefs, in Canada, claim from Vermont an equivalent of the greater part of Addison, Chittenden, Franklin and Grand Isle counties. They get their expenses to-and-fro.

== Births ==
- February 19 – Allan MacNab, businessman, soldier, lawyer and politician (died 1862)
- April 3 – Louis Lacoste, politician (died 1878)
- April 20 – William Edmond Logan, geologist (died 1875)
- April 26, – Charles-François Baillargeon, Archbishops of Quebec (died 1870)

== Deaths ==
- May 10 – George Vancouver, naval officer, explorer (b.1757)
- December 25 – Elias Hardy, lawyer and office-holder (b.1744)

=== Full date unknown ===
- Esteban José Martínez Fernández y Martínez de la Sierra, naval officer (b.1742)
