= 1758 in Canada =

- Decades: 1730s; 1740s; 1750s; 1760s; 1770s
- See also: History of Canada; Timeline of Canadian history; List of years in Canada

Events from the year 1758 in Canada.

== Incumbents ==
- French Monarch: Louis XV
- British and Irish Monarch: George II

=== Governors ===
- Governor General of New France: Pierre François de Rigaud, Marquis de Vaudreuil-Cavagnal
- Colonial Governor of Louisiana: Louis Billouart
- Governor of Nova Scotia: Charles Lawrence
- Commodore-Governor of Newfoundland: Richard Edwards

== Events ==
- Saturday July 8 - Battle of Carillon: General James Abercrombie, with 15,390 men, attacks 3,600 French and Canadian troops entrenched and barricaded at Fort Ticonderoga. The British and American colonial forces are repulsed and lose 2,000 killed and wounded.
- Wednesday July 27 - Capitulation of Louisbourg: After a 48 days siege, the British, under James Wolfe and Jeffery Amherst, capture Louisbourg, defended by about 5,637 French soldiers and sailors.
- August 26–28 - Battle of Fort Frontenac: Colonel John Bradstreet, with nearly 3,000 men, mostly colonial militia, takes and burns Fort Frontenac, (present-day Kingston).
- Thursday September 14 - Battle of Fort Duquesne: Major James Grant, with 800 Highlanders and some Virginians, is defeated by 500 French and Indians, from Fort Duquesne (present-day Pittsburgh), under Charles Philippe Aubry.
- Monday October 2 - The Nova Scotia Provincial Parliament, Canada's oldest Legislative Assembly, first met on 2 October 1758 with 22 members. For the first hundred years, this Assembly was known as the Provincial Parliament, and an elected member was called "MPP" Member of the Provincial Parliament. Since 1867, the name "Parliament" has been reserved for the federal assembly at Ottawa, and the Nova Scotia Assembly has been known as the "Legislature", with an elected member called "MLA" Member of the Legislative Assembly.
- Thursday:) October 12 - Charles Lawrence, Military Governor of Nova Scotia, issued a Proclamation that is published in the Boston Gazette, informing the people of New England that since the enemy which had formerly disturbed and harassed the province was no longer able to do so, the time had come to people and cultivate, not only the lands made vacant by the removal of the Acadians, but other parts of "this valuable province" as well. The Proclamation concluded with the words "I shall be ready to receive any proposals that may be hereafter made to me for effectually settling the vacated, or any other lands within the said province."
- Saturday November 25 - The French garrison of Fort Duquesne (500) set it on fire and abandoned it to General John Forbes. He renames it "Pittsburg," in honor of the prime minister of Great Britain, William Pitt the Elder.
- English begin capturing French fortifications, New France and Ohio Valley, the war started going their way decisively this year.
