= 1803 in Canada =

- Decades: 1780s; 1790s; 1800s; 1810s; 1820s
- See also: History of Canada; Timeline of Canadian history; List of years in Canada

Events from the year 1803 in Canada.

== Incumbents ==
- Monarch: George III

=== Federal government ===
- Parliament of Lower Canada: 3rd
- Parliament of Upper Canada: 3rd

=== Governors ===
- Governor of the Canadas: Robert Milnes
- Governor of New Brunswick: Thomas Carleton
- Governor of Nova Scotia: John Wentworth
- Commodore-Governor of Newfoundland: Charles Morice Pole
- Governor of St. John's Island: Edmund Fanning

== Events ==
- Thomas Jefferson completes Louisiana Purchase extending U.S. control west of the Mississippi River; federal plans to resettle Eastern tribes beyond the Mississippi soon begin.
- John Colter becomes the fourth man selected by William Clark to join the Lewis and Clark Expedition.
- The XY Company is reorganized under Alexander Mackenzie's name.
- First Canadian Paper Mill is built in Quebec.

== Births ==
- October 13 – Augustin-Norbert Morin, lawyer, judge, politician and Joint Premier of the Province of Canada (d.1865)
- March 24 – Egerton Ryerson, politician, teacher, principal, Methodist minister (d.1882)
- December 6 – Susanna Moodie, writer (d.1885)

=== Full date unknown ===
- John Kinder Labatt, brewer and founder of the Labatt Brewing Company (d.1866)

== Deaths ==
- Nathaniel Pettit (1724 – March 9, 1803) a political figure in Upper Canada.
- Rev. Johann Samuel Schwerdtfeger (1734–1803) The first Lutheran minister in Ontario.

== Historical documents ==
War returns as British government orders naval ships as well as vessels commissioned by letter of marque to seize ships belonging to French Republic

Keeping troops "upon their present footing" in Canada and other northern colonies costs about £200,000, but "there are considerable colonial funds"

Trade is discouraged because colonies are not allowed to directly import wine, oil, fruit etc. in exchange for their fish, lumber etc.

U.S. envoy Robert R. Livingston has told French "it was necessary to interpose us between them and Canada [to prevent] an attack from that quarter"

Report in London says U.S.A. has purchased Louisiana from France for $40 million

Jurisdiction of courts of Upper and Lower Canada is extended to "Indian Territories or Parts of America [outside U.C., L.C. and U.S.A.]"

=== Lower Canada ===
With smallpox spreading through city, Gazette recommends "speedy" inoculation with cowpox matter possessed by Quebec City physician

Reading or writing is limited on average to 5 men in country parishes; only priests, clerks, notaries, attorneys and soldiers need those skills

All resident men 18–60 must enroll in militia and those 40 and under must muster annually and give account of all firearms they have

Government to pay bounties for hemp production (highest being $10 for ½ arpent, grown and dressed) and sets prices for hemp and hempseed

To Catholics considering us "Schismatics" and "Protestant Sectaries" thinking us "slaves of authority," Anglicans should offer "superior goodness"

Treason law is against subverting constitution and "introducing the horrible system of anarchy and confusion which has so fatally prevailed in France"

When required, "every Rector, Curate, Vicar, or other Priest or Minister doing the Parochial or Clerical duty of any Parish[...]" must read acts publicly

Suspecting arson in recent Montreal fires, government offers £500 reward for information leading to conviction of arsonist

Cargo going from Montreal to Michilimackinac includes 9 kegs gunpowder, 3 bags shot and 2 cases guns, all for export via "Ouisconsin" portage

At Kahnawake mass, "Indians sing or chant very well & the Women in particular have excellent Voices;" clothing has quillwork and beadwork

"Private Lectures on Geography &c. for Young Ladies only[...]with Globes, Maps, Charts &c. together with a Planetarium, Lunarium, Tellurium &c."

"A woman of colour lately arrived" advertises in Quebec City to "attend one or more Ladies to any part of Europe"

At Quebec City, "we were struck with the Grandeur & elevation of the Banks of the River especially where Upper Town's height commands the River"

=== Upper Canada ===
Among exports to Lower Canada in 1802 were 11,400+ barrels of flour and 18,500+ feet of black walnut boards and planks

Howard Township successful hemp production brings in $1,127 profit from 12 acres of hemp, comparable to income from 65 acres of wheat

Missionary reports "the 25,000 acres allotted by the British Government for the use of the Christian Indian Congregations [are to be] secured to them"

Print: "York, the New Capital of Upper Canada, As it appeared in the Autumn of 1803"

Drawing: Queenston, Upper Canada

=== Nova Scotia ===
House of Assembly resolution that £200 be paid to "distressed Indians" at £20 per county is not agreed to by Council

Our first fault "is that in the fall of Adam we lost [the] most prevailing characteristic of [God's] nature and essence, love"

Politician James DeLancey sues Halifax merchant for harbouring escaped enslaved man Jack, employing him and refusing to return him

Incoming University of King's College students must have knowledge of Greek and Latin, including Virgil, Horace, "the Greek Testament," Homer etc.

Mission schoolmaster, praised for his many years of devoted service, is said in early years to have slept on straw and eaten herring and potatoes

Sable Island commissioners request detailed report from its superintendent on likelihood of growing food and fishing and sealing there

New Englander, resident in Horton Township (Wolfville) since 1760, dies at age 107 and leaves more than 100 descendants

=== New Brunswick ===
Four "descendents of the Ancient Chiefs of the pockmouche tribe, which are now reduced to only two famillys," receive 200 acres of land each

Survey of Northumberland County gives population as 479 families (with about 100 in Miramichi) and status of hay crop, fishery, and timber resources

Legislature news includes bounty paid for hemp and Council voting down bills to finance schools and allow Methodist clergy to perform marriages

Charlotte County needs help supporting indigent people crossing U.S. border and "sick and maimed Seamen" left on shore "in a suffering condition"

£200 from Indian fund would spur "man of eminence" to be mathematics professor in proposed academy "of the highest importance to this Country"

=== Labrador ===
Moravian missionaries upset about "the injury [nearby Europeans] would do to our baptized Esquimaux" drawn to "their uncontrouled behaviour"

"Esquimaux[...]are not all so firmly rooted[...]in the faith, that they might not[...]enter into some of the ways of the heathen when left to themselves"

=== Cape Breton Island ===
"The Island of Cape Breton is replete with natural advantages far exceeding any other British settlement in North America"

Names of residents with property qualification for grand or petit jury will go on individual slips of paper to be drawn when needed for jury duty

Man fathering child with woman he is not married to must provide support or face fine or jail, and any woman making false claim faces whipping

=== Hudson's Bay Company ===
Churchill post blacksmith found walking in snow complains "of great lowness of Spirits" and "having but little sleep for 14 nights"

Gardens at Churchill post produce 6¾ tons of "excellent" turnips and 6-700 small but "very fine quality" cabbages

=== Elsewhere ===
Chief Maquinna's anger at insults from captain of British trading ship in Nootka Sound leads to his revenge on crew (Note: "savages" used)
