= 1740 in Canada =

- Decades: 1720s; 1730s; 1740s; 1750s; 1760s
- See also: History of Canada; Timeline of Canadian history; List of years in Canada

Events from the year 1740 in Canada.

== Incumbents ==
- French Monarch: Louis XV
- British and Irish Monarch: George II

=== Governors ===
- Governor General of New France: Charles de la Boische, Marquis de Beauharnois
- Colonial Governor of Louisiana: Jean-Baptiste Le Moyne de Bienville
- Governor of Nova Scotia: Paul Mascarene
- Commodore-Governor of Newfoundland: Henry Medley

== Events ==
- 1740s: The Mandan Indians west of the Great Lakes begin to trade in horses descended from those brought to Texas by the Spanish. Itinerant Assiniboine Indians bring them from Mandan settlements to their own territories southwest of Lake Winnipeg.
- 1740-1748: The War of the Austrian Succession, with the American counterpart King George's War.

== Deaths ==
- August 20 : François-Louis de Pourroy de Lauberivière, bishop of Quebec (b. 1711).
