= 1742 in Canada =

- Decades: 1720s; 1730s; 1740s; 1750s; 1760s
- See also: History of Canada; Timeline of Canadian history; List of years in Canada

Events from the year 1742 in Canada.

== Incumbents ==
- French Monarch: Louis XV
- British and Irish Monarch: George II

=== Governors ===
- Governor General of New France: Charles de la Boische, Marquis de Beauharnois
- Colonial Governor of Louisiana: Jean-Baptiste Le Moyne de Bienville
- Governor of Nova Scotia: Paul Mascarene
- Commodore-Governor of Newfoundland: Henry Medley

== Events ==
- First scientific report on the North Pacific fur seal.
- First Fort Paskoya built by La Vérendrye at Cedar Lake.

== Births ==
- Esteban José Martínez Fernández y Martínez de la Sierra, naval officer (died 1798)
- Benjamin Frobisher, fur-trader (died 1787)
