= 1757 in Canada =

- Decades: 1730s; 1740s; 1750s; 1760s; 1770s
- See also: History of Canada; Timeline of Canadian history; List of years in Canada

Events from the year 1757 in Canada.

== Incumbents ==
- French Monarch: Louis XV
- British and Irish Monarch: George II

=== Governors ===
- Governor General of New France: Pierre François de Rigaud, Marquis de Vaudreuil-Cavagnal
- Colonial Governor of Louisiana: Louis Billouart
- Governor of Nova Scotia: Charles Lawrence
- Commodore-Governor of Newfoundland: Richard Edwards

== Events ==
- Thursday March 17 to Tuesday March 22 - In four nights 1,500 Canadiens and Indians destroy the out-works of Fort William-Henry.
- Saturday July 30 - Seven thousand men are collected to attack Fort William Henry.
- Tuesday August 9 - The Fort, garrisoned by 2,200, capitulates. Violating the terms of capitulation, Indians kill, or recapture, many of the garrison, whereupon Montcalm exclaims: "Kill me, but spare the English who are under my protection."
- Of the 5,000 French soldiers expected, only 1,500 reach Canada.
- December - The troops, in Canada, complain of being fed on horse-flesh and too little bread.

== Births ==
- June 22: George Vancouver, naval officer, explorer (d.1798)

== Deaths ==
- November 2 : Louis Coulon de Villiers, military officer.
