= 1743 in Canada =

- Decades: 1720s; 1730s; 1740s; 1750s; 1760s
- See also: History of Canada; Timeline of Canadian history; List of years in Canada

Events from the year 1743 in Canada.

== Incumbents ==
- French Monarch: Louis XV
- British and Irish Monarch: George II

=== Governors ===
- Governor General of New France: Charles de la Boische, Marquis de Beauharnois
- Colonial Governor of Louisiana: Jean-Baptiste Le Moyne de Bienville then Pierre de Rigaud, Marquis de Vaudreuil-Cavagnial
- Governor of Nova Scotia: Paul Mascarene
- Commodore-Governor of Newfoundland: Thomas Smith

== Events ==
- Concentrated hunting of sea otter by Russia begins.
- Father Claude-Godefroy Coquart joins La Vérendrye at Fort La Reine becoming the first recorded missionary in present-day Manitoba and the first to travel beyond Lake of the Woods.

== Deaths ==
- April 11 - Jean-Baptiste Chardon, jesuit missionary (born 1672).
