= 1759 in Canada =

- Decades: 1730s; 1740s; 1750s; 1760s; 1770s
- See also: History of Canada; Timeline of Canadian history; List of years in Canada

Events from the year 1759 in Canada.

== Incumbents ==
- French Monarch: Louis XV
- British and Irish Monarch: George II

=== Governors ===
- Governor General of New France: Pierre François de Rigaud, Marquis de Vaudreuil-Cavagnal
- Colonial Governor of Louisiana: Louis Billouart
- Governor of Nova Scotia: Charles Lawrence
- Commodore-Governor of Newfoundland: Richard Edwards

== Events ==
- Tuesday May 22 - A British fleet approaches Quebec.
- Thursday June 28 - French fire ships, intended to burn the British fleet, at Quebec, are taken ashore by British sailors.
- Thursday July 26 - Carillon (Fort Ticonderoga) is abandoned by the French.
- Saturday July 28 - Another French fireship attack fails against the British.
- Tuesday July 31 - British forces attempt to take French fortifications at Montmorency and fail bitterly.
- August 8 to August 9 - British guns, on Pointe Lévis, fire the lower town of Quebec.
- Thursday September 13 - James Wolfe lands a force at Fuller's Cove, between 1 and 2 in the morning. They climb to the Plains of Abraham. At 6 a.m., Marquis de Montcalm is informed that the British have accomplished what he deemed impossible; but discredits the report. With 4,500, he fights about an equal number; but his men cannot resist bayonets. Each leader receives a mortal wound. Wolfe asks an officer to support him so that his followers may not be discouraged by his fall.
- Friday September 14 - Montcalm dies in the Château St-Louis.
- Monday September 17 - Capitulation of Quebec.
- Tuesday September 18 - The British take possession of Quebec.
- Proclamation issued by Governor of Nova Scotia invites New Englanders to settle there.

== Deaths ==
- September 13 - James Wolfe, British Army officer (born 1727)
- September 14 - Marquis de Montcalm, French Military Commander (Born 1712)
