= 1799 in Canada =

- Decades: 1770s; 1780s; 1790s; 1800s; 1810s
- See also: History of Canada; Timeline of Canadian history; List of years in Canada

Events from the year 1799 in Canada.

== Incumbents ==
- Monarch: George III

=== Federal government ===
- Parliament of Lower Canada: 2nd
- Parliament of Upper Canada: 2nd

=== Governors ===
- Governor of the Canadas: Robert Prescott then Robert Milnes
- Governor of New Brunswick: Thomas Carleton
- Governor of Nova Scotia: John Wentworth
- Commodore-Governor of Newfoundland: John Elliot
- Governor of St. John's Island: Edmund Fanning
- Governor of Upper Canada: John Graves Simcoe then Peter Hunter

== Events ==
- David Thompson marries Charlotte Small
- North West Company establishes a fur post at Rocky Mountain House, Alberta. The nearby Hudson's Bay Company fur post which is also established at this time is called Acton House.
- Alexander Mackenzie resigns from North West Company
- George Vancouver's Journeys to the North Pacific Ocean published in London
- Handsome Lake, a Seneca chief, founds the Longhouse religion
- Russian-American Fur Company chartered; launches aggressive policy in Aleutians and on Northwest Coast.
- American competition for West Indies trade kills Liverpool, Nova Scotia's merchant fleet.
- Alexander Baranov establishes Russian post known today as Old Sitka; trade charter grants exclusive trading rights to the Russian American Company.
- Vermont answers Indian chiefs, in Canada, that their claims were extinguished by treaties of 1763 and 1783 between France, Great Britain and the United States.
- Two cases are filed challenging slavery in New Brunswick: R v Jones and R v Agnew.

== Births ==
- September 8 – Sir William Young, Premier of Nova Scotia (d.1887)
- October 30 – Ignace Bourget, bishop of the Diocese of Montreal (d.1885)

=== Full date unknown ===
- Joseph Cunard, merchant, shipbuilder and politician (d.1865)

== Deaths ==
- January 15 – Alexander McKee, agent for the Indian Department (b.1735)

=== Full date unknown ===
- Philip Turnor, HBC inland surveyor (b.1751)
