= William Tyng =

William Tyng (August 17, 1737–December 10, 1807) was a sheriff in Cumberland County, Massachusetts (now Maine) during the American Revolution. Born in Boston in 1737, Tyng was appointed Sheriff of Cumberland County in 1767. He He continued in as sheriff until he was forced to surrender his authority after being confronted by men with muskets who entered Falmouth (Portland) from the surrounding countryside during the American Revolution.

Tyng's home was stripped of all valuable materials and he was forced to board HMS Canceaux for safety.

Tyng fled to New Brunswick during the war and settled temporarily in Saint John, New Brunswick, where he was given six city lots by the British Crown. He returned to the United States in 1793 and settled in Gorham, Massachusetts. He died in 1807 of apoplexy.

== Family ==
His father was Edward Tyng, a British colonial sea captain and naval officer born in Falmouth, Massachusetts. Tyng Street, a short street in Portland's West End neighborhood, is named for the family.
