= 1804 in Canada =

- Decades: 1780s; 1790s; 1800s; 1810s; 1820s
- See also: History of Canada; Timeline of Canadian history; List of years in Canada

Events from the year 1804 in Canada.

== Incumbents ==
- Monarch: George III

=== Federal government ===
- Parliament of Lower Canada: 3rd (until June 13)
- Parliament of Upper Canada: 3rd (until March 9)

=== Governors ===
- Governor of the Canadas: Robert Milnes
- Governor of New Brunswick: Thomas Carleton
- Governor of Nova Scotia: John Wentworth
- Commodore-Governor of Newfoundland: Erasmus Gower
- Governor of Prince Edward Island: Edmund Fanning then Joseph Frederick Wallet DesBarres

== Events ==
- October 8 – HMS Speedy sinks during a snowstorm.
- David Thompson works in Peace River country.
- Lewis and Clark start up the Missouri River.
- Merger of the North West Company and XY Fur Companies. The XY Company is absorbed by the North West Company.
- 1,400 American ships are fishing off Labrador and in the Gulf of St. Lawrence.
- The earliest Fraktur paintings appear in Lincoln County, Upper Canada.
- Russians return to Sitka and attack Kiksadi fort on Indian River. Russians lose the battle, but Natives are forced to flee. Baranov re-establishes trading post.
- Locks are placed at Coteau, the Cascades and at Long Sault.

=== Full date unknown ===
- McTavish Column completed

== Births ==
- February 29 – Antoine Plamondon, artist (d.1895)
- May 12 – Robert Baldwin, politician (d.1858)
- December 13 – Joseph Howe, Premier of Nova Scotia (d.1873)

== Deaths ==
- July 6 – Simon McTavish, fur trader and dealer in furs, militia officer, office holder, landowner, seigneur, and businessman (b.1750)

== Historical documents ==
In France "no tyrant could ever be so cruel in his own name as in that of 'the people;' [we see the greatest impostor] throw away the last of his masks"

"No two countries in the world, at this moment, feel a more natural inclination to remain at peace with each other than Great Britain and America"

Map: northern North America with "areas of Native American habitation, some major settlements, and coastal configuration of major waterways"

With order that military provisions be product of North American colonies, commissary calls for proposals for supplying flour, pork and pease

New women's biographical dictionary briefly mentions Frances Brooke's novel Emily Montague, considered first novel written in Canada

Glass dress satisfies "lover's eye with the sight of charms hitherto invisible" yet protects from "wind and weather" - satire of sheer fabric in dresses

=== Lower Canada ===
Sermon claims "the present war is not merely [about] a right to certain extent of territory [but] a contest between civil order and confusion"

"The greatest attention must be given to the marching, which is the fundamental and essential part of military instruction" - militia manual

Bishop consecrates new Anglican cathedral in Quebec City before lieutenant governor "and many respectable persons of the Congregation"

After failures, Gaspé JP experiments on children to show neighbours that cowpox inoculation protects against smallpox, and then treats newborns

Death notice for Simon McTavish notes "His talents and exertions had secured him fortune [and he was] a man of a generous and dignified character"

People suggesting James Wolfe epitaph "wish'd it not to reflect on the nation he opposed [because] this might not only hurt feelings" but be inelegant

Defence of missionary Clark Bentom against prosecution for practicing as clergyman without authorization

"From Quebec to Montreal [are] beautiful landscapes, the banks being in many places very bold and steep, and shaded with lofty trees"

"A Course of Chemistry, in eighteen Lectures, will commence at Doctor Blanchet's;" admission: ½ guinea each

School will prepare "Young Men, in the shortest time, for the Counting house and business in general" (with free classes evenings and Sundays)

School for young ladies will teach "French and English grammatically with Plain and Muslin Work" and writing, arithmetic, geography, arts etc.

Alterations to building near Hope Gate, Quebec City will complete Patagonian Theatre, which will open with opera "The Castle of Andalusia"

"The Excellent Comedy of "Speed the Plough"[...]is to be presented on Tuesday evening for the benefit of the Poor"

=== Upper Canada ===
"Persons of respectability" (including solicitor general, judge and members of legislature) are assumed lost with schooner on Lake Ontario

Newcomers may be arrested "to protect His Majesty's subjects[...]from the insidious attempts or designs of evil minded and seditious persons"

John Norton's translation of Gospel of John into Kanien'keha has English version on opposite pages

Woman convicted for keeping "disorderly house for reception of loose, vicious and lewd persons" gets 6 months in jail, including 4 hours in pillory

=== Nova Scotia ===
"'Tis not the province of unqualified individuals to inquire whether any act of power be abusive or not; [...]simple obedience is their indispensable duty"

Simeon Perkins' schooner uninsured because he had agent seek insurance at 7–8% premium at most when French privateers make 15% lowest rate

"The country swarms with Anabaptist + Methodist preachers," some backed by man with status one would assume favoured established church

Wanting his children educated, Perkins puts his daughter in school to "give the others an Opportunity to gain Something from her to advantage"

=== New Brunswick ===
"Enormity of their Ignorance" and "Poor distressed and discontented" state mean more Indigenous people's schooling needed (note: "savages" used)

Men walk to Quebec City (including 300 miles on snowshoes) where, despite uncooperative officials, they recruit 100 men for military service

=== Labrador ===
"Fire from the Lord" begins in Hopedale and spreads through Labrador Inuit, causing them to more genuinely accept missionaries' teachings

Missionaries urge Inuit to love, know and "devote themselves to [Jesus] with soul and body as his blood-bought property"

Inuk writes that he has changed from being "bad" to turning "with my whole heart to Jesus" and feeling "His forgiveness is my only comfort"

=== Elsewhere ===
Profile of agricultural and other resources of Prince Edward Island includes one property for sale there

Country from Lake Superior "to the Stony or Chipewan mountains" has cold of Siberia, and wells are impracticable because land is frozen year-round

Fort Albany staff barely contain fire spread by sparks from chimney of large "Mens" fireplace, which is pulled down afterward and replaced with stove
