= Edward Tyng =

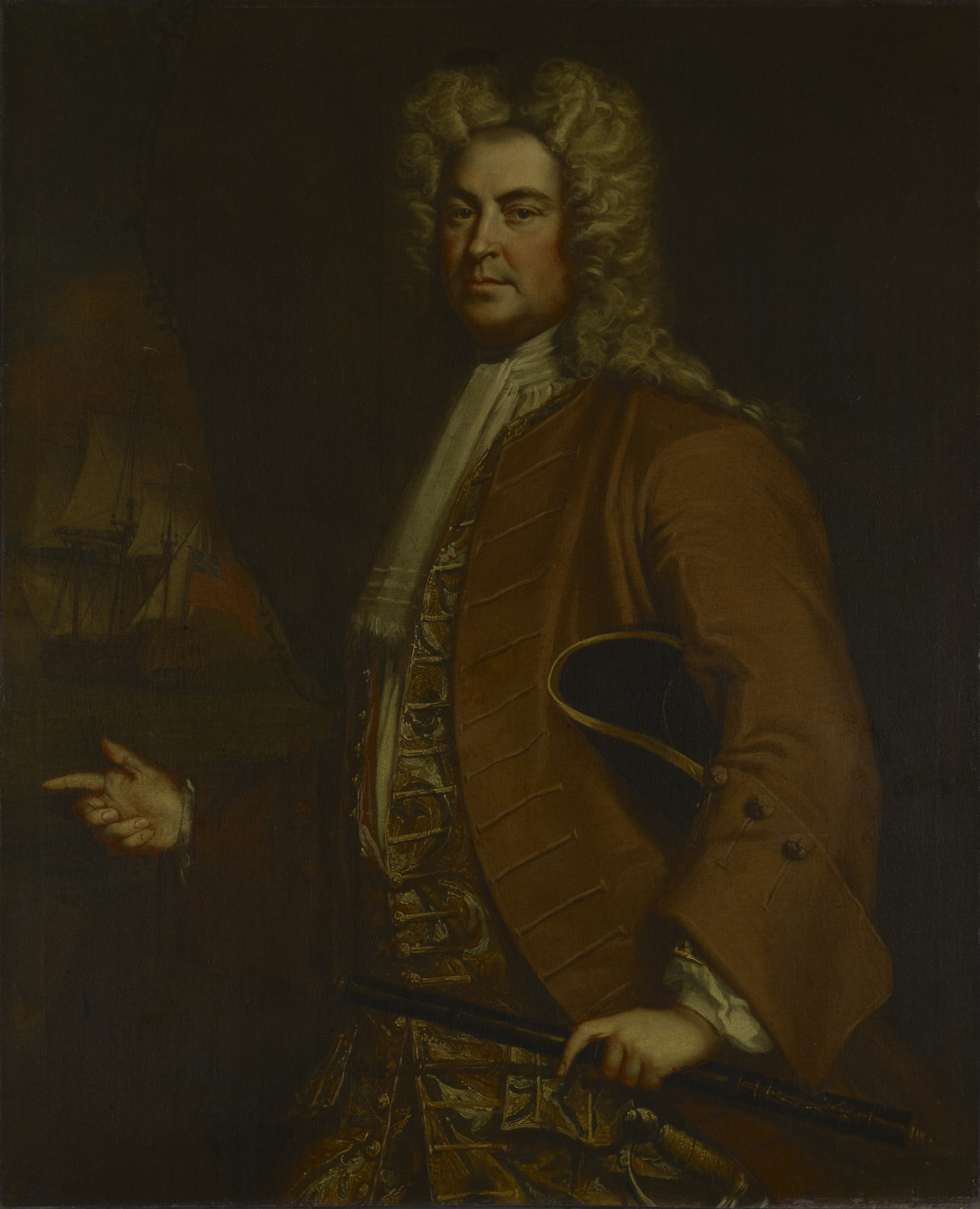
- Born: 1683; Falmouth, Massachusetts
- Died: 7 September 1755 (aged 71–72); Boston, Massachusetts
- Military career
- Allegiance: Massachusetts
- Service years: 1740–1755
- Rank: Commodore
- Commands: Prince of Orange
- Conflicts: King George's War: Siege of Annapolis Royal (1744); Siege of Annapolis Royal (1745); Siege of Louisbourg (1745); Capture of Vigilant

Commodore Edward Tyng (1683 – 7 September 1755) was an American sea captain and naval officer. He was appointed as captain of the batteries and fortifications of Boston and in 1740 made the commander of the Province of Massachusetts Bay's first warship, Prince of Orange. Tyng was the son-in-law of Cyprian Southack and the son of Edward Tyng, who, during King William's War, was the commander of Fort Loyal, Fort William Henry and later became Governor of Acadia, only to be taken prisoner in the Naval battle off St. John (1691).

During King George's War Tyng defeated the Mi'kmaq militia, French and Acadian sieges of Annapolis Royal in 1744 and again the following year (1745). As commodore of the fleet, Tyng led 13 armed vessels and about 90 transports in the successful Siege of Louisbourg (1745). He participated in the Capture of the Vigilant and the destruction of Port Dauphin (Englishtown, Nova Scotia) in June 1745.

His son was Col William Tyng who was a soldier in the British army.

== Gallery ==
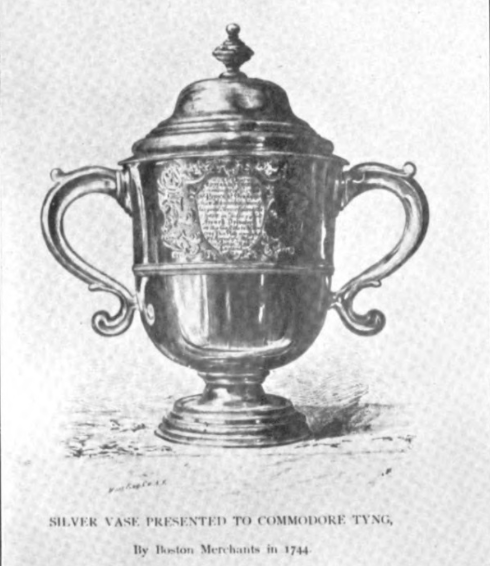
Silver Cup presented to Edward Tyng by Boston Merchants for defeating Captain Joannis-Galand d'Olabaratz, the first French privateer off the Boston coast, 24 June 1744

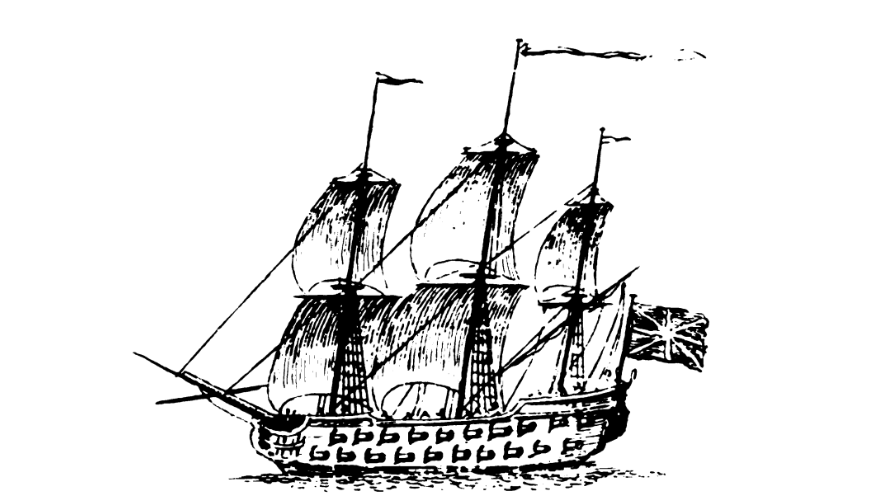
Commanded by Tyng - Massachusetts (frigate), Flagship for Siege of Louisbourg, 1745
