= 1802 in Canada =

- Decades: 1780s; 1790s; 1800s; 1810s; 1820s
- See also: History of Canada; Timeline of Canadian history; List of years in Canada

Events from the year 1802 in Canada.

== Incumbents ==
- Monarch: George III

=== Federal government ===
- Parliament of Lower Canada: 3rd
- Parliament of Upper Canada: 3rd

=== Governors ===
- Governor of the Canadas: Robert Milnes
- Governor of New Brunswick: Thomas Carleton
- Governor of Nova Scotia: John Wentworth
- Commodore-Governor of Newfoundland: Charles Morice Pole
- Governor of St. John's Island: Edmund Fanning

== Events ==
- The Tlingit start resisting Russian incursions into their territory.
- First Nations massacre Russians at Old Sitka; only a few survive.
- Alexander Mackenzie is knighted for his efforts in 1802 and becomes a member of the XY Company.
- Saint Mary's University is founded at Halifax.

== Births ==
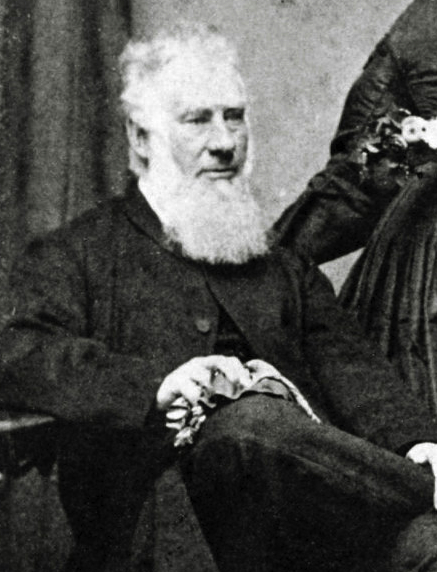
Samuel Bealey Harrison

- January 9 – Catharine Parr Traill, writer (d.1899)
- March 4 – Samuel Harrison, farmer, lawyer, mill owner, politician, judge and 1st Joint Premiers of the Province of Canada (d.1867)
- May 2 – Étienne Parent, journalist (d.1874)
- July 9 – Edmond Baird, cabinet-maker and upholsterer (d.1859)
- October 31 – Charles Dickson Archibald, lawyer, businessman and politician (d.1868)

=== Full date unknown ===
- Henry Sherwood, lawyer, local politician and 4th Premier of Canada West (d.1855)

== Deaths ==
- April 3 – Philippe-François de Rastel de Rocheblave, soldier, businessman and political figure in Lower Canada (b. 1727)
