= Siege of Annapolis Royal (1744) =

Siege in 1744

- Part of King George's War
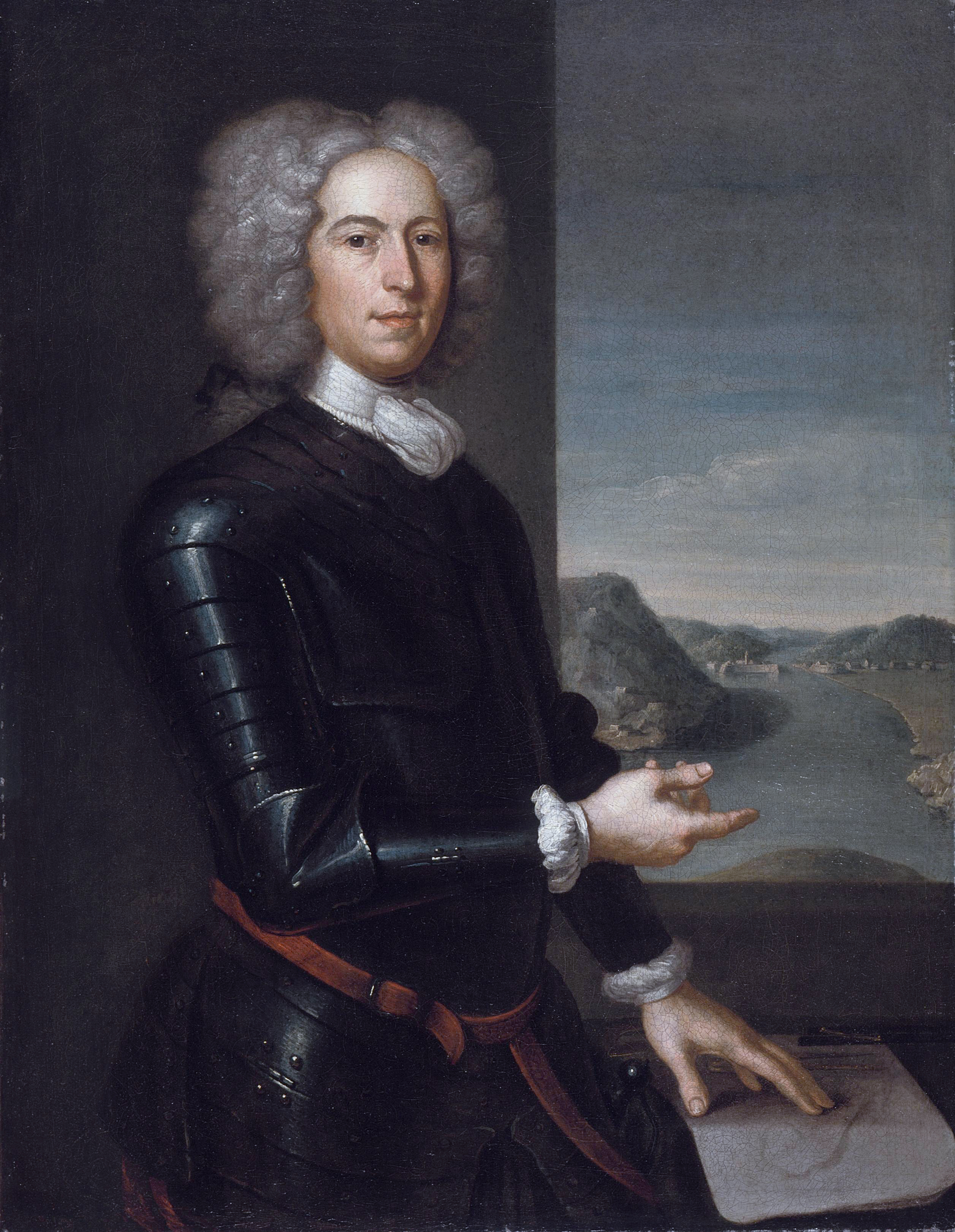
- Nova Scotia Lt. Gov. Paul Mascarene, commander of the 40th Regiment, portrait by John Smibert, 1729
Date	1 July – 6 October 1744
Location	Fort Anne, Annapolis Royal, Nova Scotia 44°44′28.1″N 65°30′40.8″W
Result	British victory

Belligerents
Great Britain	France; Mi'kmaq Indians; Maliseet Indians

Commanders and leaders
Paul Mascarene; John Gorham; Edward How; Edward Tyng	Jean-Louis Le Loutre; François Dupont Duvivier; Pierre Maillard; Joseph-Nicolas Gautier; Joseph LeBlanc

Strength
100 (first siege); 250 (second siege)	300–500 (first siege); 600–700 total; 24 Acadians, 56 French soldiers, 100 Mi'kmaq from Ile Royal, 30 Mi'kmaq from Nova Scotia (second siege)

Casualties and losses
"considerable British casualties each night" (Sept.9–15)	Maliesst

The siege of Annapolis Royal (also known as the siege of Fort Anne) in 1744 involved two of four attempts by the French, along with their Acadian and native allies, to regain the capital of Nova Scotia/Acadia, Annapolis Royal, during King George's War. The siege is noted for Governor of Nova Scotia Paul Mascarene successfully defending the last British outpost in the colony and for the first arrival of New England Ranger John Gorham to Nova Scotia. The French and Mi'kmaq land forces were thwarted on both attempts on the capital because of the failure of French naval support to arrive.

== Historical context ==
The conquest of Acadia by Great Britain began with the 1710 capture of the provincial capital, Port Royal. In the 1713 Treaty of Utrecht, France formally ceded Acadia to Britain. However, there was disagreement about the provincial boundaries, and some Acadians also resisted British rule. With renewed war imminent in 1744, the leaders of New France formulated plans to retake what the British called Nova Scotia with an assault on the capital, which the British had renamed Annapolis Royal.

With the outbreak of the War of the Austrian Succession (whose North American theater is also known as King George's War) in Europe, the French colony of Île-Royale (present-day Cape Breton Island) received the news first and took immediate action. French officer François Dupont Duvivier led an attack on raided the British outpost at Canso, capturing the small garrison of the 40th Regiment of Foot without incident. Du Vivier's next plan was to take the only other British outpost in Nova Scotia, Annapolis Royal.

== First stage ==
The governor of Ile Royal, Jean-Baptiste Prévost du Quesnel, lacking the troop strength to attack Annapolis Royal, recruited the militant French priest Jean-Louis Le Loutre to raise a force of Acadians and Indians to assault the Nova Scotian capital. Le Loutre raised a force of 300 Mi'kmaq and Maliseet, and arrived before Annapolis Royal's main fortification, Fort Anne, on 12 July 1744. The attackers killed two soldiers, and the assault ended after four days with the arrival of British ships with 70 soldiers from Boston. Le Loutre withdrew to Grand Pre to await the arrival of DuVivier.

== Second stage ==
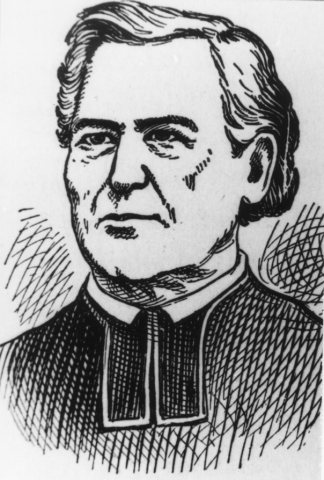
Jean-Louis Le Loutre

François Dupont Duvivier, who had led the Canso raid, led the second siege attempt against Fort Anne, with a force of 200 troops. Duvivier arrived at Fort Anne on 6 September 1744. The first night he erected shelters. He used Gautier's house for his Headquarters. The next morning he approached the fort and the Governor of Nova Scotia, Paul Mascarene responded by firing a cannon, which lead Duvivier to withdraw. That night Duvivier sent small parties to the fort which led to skirmishing the whole night.

On the morning of 7 September, Duvivier sent his younger brother to the fort under a flag of truce carrying a message that said British resistance was futile. Paul Mascarene, rejected the surrender demand, and replied that naval reinforcements were on the way and that if the French surrendered they would receive benign treatment. Duvivier gave them twenty four hours before he said he would attack at noon on 8 September.

Duvivier waited until 9 September to begin the siege. The French troops and Mi'kmaq attacked the wall of the fort each night and conducted daily raids around the ramparts. On 15 September, Duvivier again asked Mascarene to surrender which he refused. They continued to fight. On 25 September a British sergeant was killed and a private was wounded.

During the siege Duvivier waited weeks for French vessels to arrive to reinforce his attack, while Mascarene awaited for support from Boston. On September 26, New England Ranger John Gorham and Edward Tyng arrived with 50 native rangers (see Gorham's Rangers). Gorham's rangers brought the total manpower of the garrison up to about 270. A few days later, Gorham led his native rangers in a surprise raid on a nearby Mi'kmaq encampment. They killed and mutilated the bodies of women and children. The Mi'kmaq withdrew and Duvivier was forced to retreat back to Grand Pre on 5 October. (The following year, Mi'kmaq sought revenge on Gorham's Rangers by torturing the rangers they took prisoner at Goat Island (off Annapolis Royal) during the siege of Annapolis Royal.

== Consequences ==
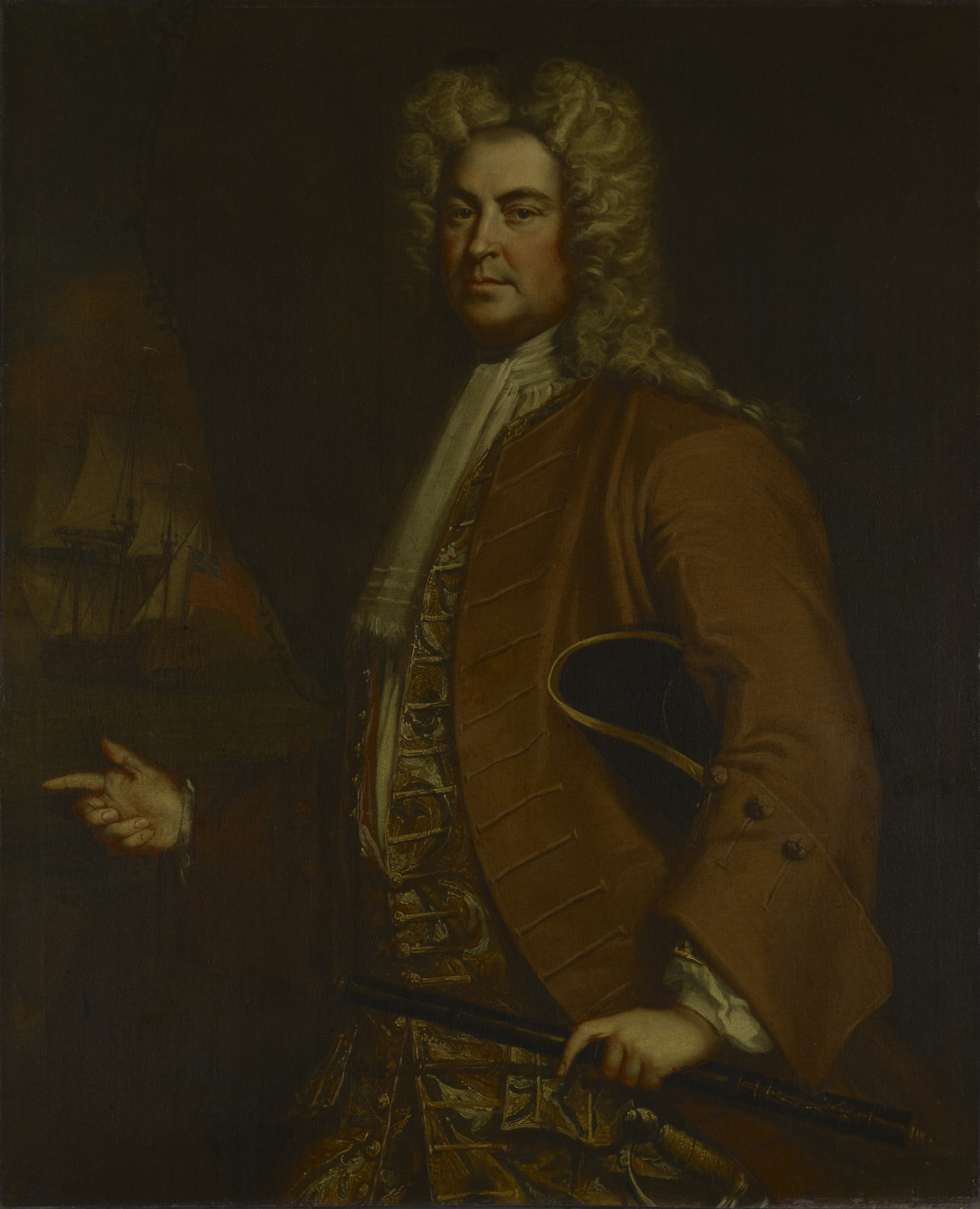
Commodor Edward Tyng by Joseph Blackburn

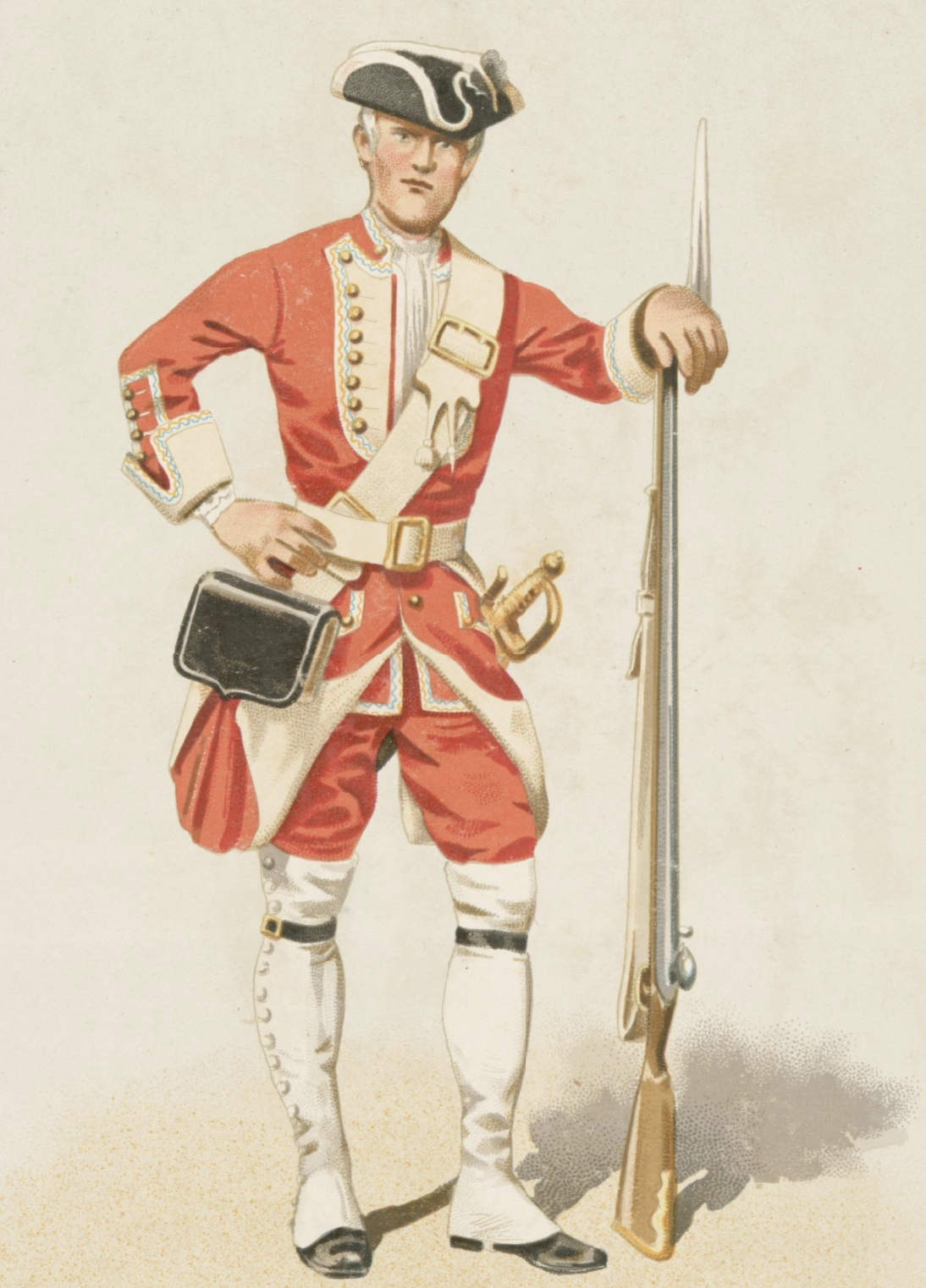
Private, 40th Regiment of Foot, Nova Scotia, 1742

From this siege, the French learned that until they could send an army with siege guns and cannon against the capital, there was little to gain from exposing their forces in a siege. A successful French campaign would depend on the navy's ability to supply the army. The French also learned that they could not rely on the majority of Acadians to take up arms against the British.

On 20 October 1744 the government of Massachusetts officially declared war on the Mi'kmaq. A bounty was offered for the head of any man, woman or child.

Duvivier received the Order of Saint Louis for his military work in Acadia.

The French made two further attempts, both unsuccessful, to regain Annapolis Royal during the war.

== See also ==
- Military history of Nova Scotia
