= Vincent de Rochemore =

French nobleman (1726–1763)

Vincent Rochemore
- Born: c. 1726; Languedoc, France
- Died: 1763 (aged c. 37); France
- Spouse: Marie-Madeleine Gaston (m. 1748)
- Children: Francois and Louis
- Parent(s): Henri Rochemore; Marie-Blanche Ricard

Vincent Gaspard Pierre de Rochemore (c. 1726–1763) was a French nobleman from Languedoc who entered the military as a career. In the mid-18th century, he was appointed as a colonial official in French Louisiana, where he served as the Commissary-General of the Marine and Ordonnateur of Louisiana. He is chiefly known for his bitter conflict with the Chevalier de Kerlerec, the colonial governor from 1753 to 1763, who ordered him recalled to France. Rochemore was imprisoned for a time, but he was able to get support for his side of their dispute and succeeded in having Kerlerec recalled. The former governor was sent into exile.

== Biography ==
Vincent Gaspard Pierre de Rochemore was born in Languedoc, France as the fifth son of Henri de Rochemore (d. 1739), Chevalier de St. Louis and seigneur de la Dévèze, and his wife Marie-Blanche de Ricard. His father was a lieutenant of the ships of the king. As a younger son, Vincent would not inherit the title or estate. He entered the French military, becoming an officer. He married Marie-Madeleine de Gaston in 1748 at Rochefort-du-Gard, and they had two sons, Francois (b. 1751) and Louis (b. 1755).

De Rochemore was appointed to serve as the Commissary-General of the Marine and Ordonnateur of Louisiana, and reached New Orleans in 1758. In this position, Rochemore was responsible for the administration of justice in the colony, as well as the regulation of commerce, finances, and policing. He came into almost instant conflict with governor Kerlerec. Rochemore refused to authorize payment to the Swiss mercenaries serving in the colony, whom Kerlerec had hired as he believed they maintained much-needed discipline. The two accused each other of corruption. At one point, the governor had Rochemore's secretary dragged from his bed at three in the morning by a detachment of soldiers, to be removed from the colony by ship.

Kerlerec arranged for Rochemore to be recalled to France to answer charges, along with two other of the governor's political enemies, Antoine Marigny and Royal Treasurer Jean-Baptist Beaupre. Rochemore used his influence in France to discredit Kerlerec. The governor was removed from his position as governor and recalled to France; then Kerlerec was exiled.

Rochemore died in France in 1763, survived by his widow and two sons. His younger son, Louis, died in battle in 1778 while commanding one of the ships in the fleet of Pierre Suffren. The older son, François, was a career French military officer. During the French Revolution, he was among French nobles who were imprisoned. He was later executed on charges of conspiracy during his imprisonment.
