= Jean Baptiste d'Estrehan =

Louisiana colonial administrator (d. 1765)

Jean-Baptiste Beaupre
- Born: 27 January 1716; Paris, France
- Died: 26 February 1765 (aged 49); New Orleans, West Florida, Great Britain
- Spouse: Jeanne Gauvret
- Children: Jean, and 5 others

Jean-Baptiste d'Estrehan de Beaupré (surname often written as Destrehan; born 27 January 1716 - died 26 February 1765) was a high-ranking French official in colonial Louisiana and the founder of the Destrehan family there. A native of France, he was appointed Royal Treasurer of Louisiana early in the colony's history. He arrived in New Orleans in 1722, the year it was designated as the capital of Louisiana (New France).

== Biography ==
D'Estrehan is credited with the completion of the Harvey Canal on the west bank of the Mississippi River in 1739, which connected the river with Barataria Bay to the south and thus to the Gulf of Mexico. The canal work took many years. He cultivated indigo as a commodity crop on his west bank plantation. In 1746, d'Estrehan was appointed as Comptroller of the colony. He held both this position and the treasurer position until his death in 1765.

D'Estrehan married Jeanne Catherine de Gauvret (daughter of Jean-Baptiste de Gauvret, an officer of colonial troops, and Jeanne Catherine Pierre). They had six children together, the most notable of whom was Jean Destrehan, after whom the town of Destrehan was named. Another son, Jean Baptiste Honoré d'Estrehan, was the first husband of Marie Felicité de St. Maxent. After his death, she married Bernardo Gálvez, a Spanish colonial governor during the decades of Spanish rule in the late 18th century. D'Estrehan's daughter, Marie Marguerite, married Étienne Boré, who was appointed as the first mayor of New Orleans after the United States made the Louisiana Purchase. Daughter Jeanne Marie d'Estrehan, married Pierre Philippe de Marigny, the son of Antoine Marigny, a French Creole geographer and explorer. She was the mother of Bernard Marigny.

In his role as a colonial official, d'Estrehan clashed with the colonial governor Kerlerec, who described him as being "too rich and dangerous." In 1763, Kerlerec ordered d'Estrehan to be returned to France, along with the Commissary-Commissioner Vincent Rochemore and Antoine Philippe de Marigny, with whom the governor was in conflict. In France d'Estrehan and the other men were briefly held in the Bastille. They convinced the colonial administration of their view, and Kerlerec was recalled. D'Estrehan returned to New Orleans, where he lived for the remainder of his life.

== See also ==
- History of Harvey, Louisiana
