= Capture of Vigilant =

1745 naval battle

- Part of the King George's War
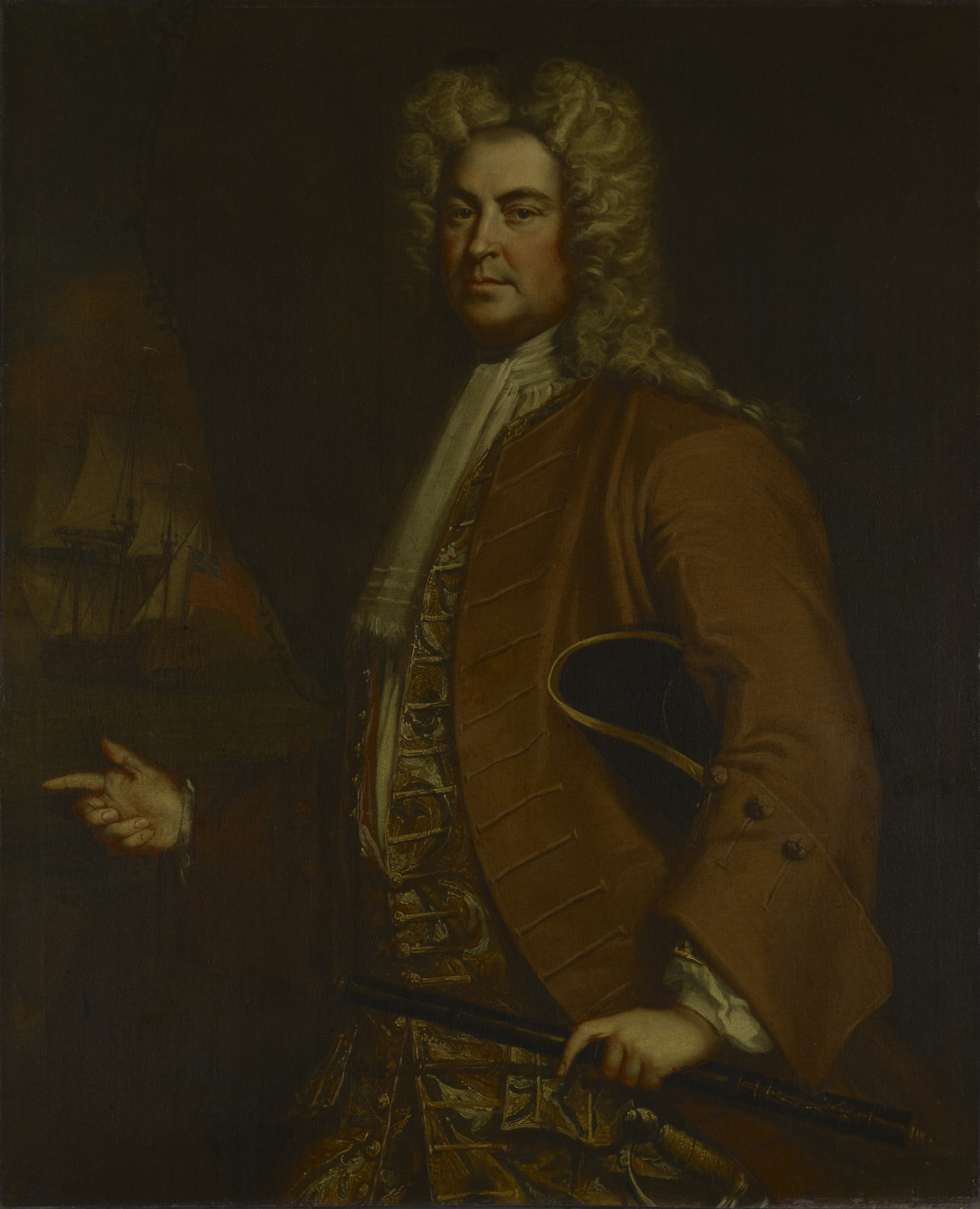
- Edward Tyng
Date	18–20 May 1745
Location	off Fortress Louisbourg
Result	British victory

Belligerents
Great Britain	France

Commanders and leaders
(Kingdom of Great Britain) Peter Warren; Edward Tyng	(Kingdom of France) Marquis de la Maisonfort

Strength
5 ships of the line	1 ship of the line; 500 men

Casualties and losses
6 wounded (including Tyng)	1 ship of the line captured 35 killed & 26 wounded 100 prisoners

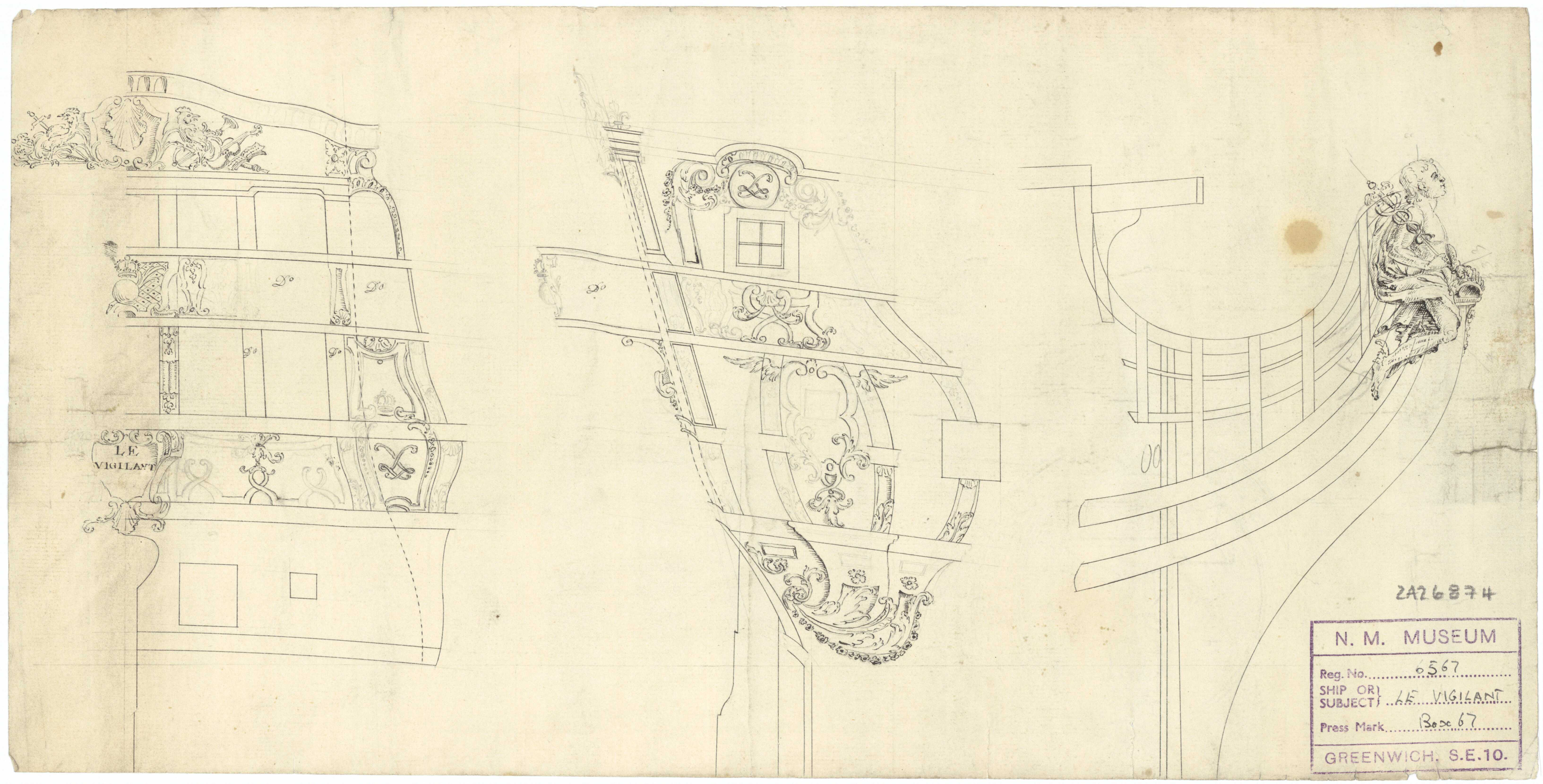
Vigilant in 1745, a captured French third rate, as taken off prior to fitting as a 58-gun two-decker fourth rate

The Capture of Vigilant was an incident in May 1745 of the naval warfare of King George's War. British forces captured the French vessel Vigilant off Nova Scotia.

It involved Commodore Warren in HMS Superb (60 guns), Captain Durell in HMS Eltham (40 guns), Captain Calmady in HMS Launceston, Captain Douglas in HMS Mermaid and Captain John Rous of HMS Shirley Galley who fought the French ship Vigilant (64 guns) off Louisbourg. Douglas in Mermaid (40 guns) engaged the French ship. John Rous in Shirley Galley was the first to fire, giving the ship several broadsides into the stern. Captain Durell was next to give a broadside. The commodore got alongside the ship - they fired briskly, tearing the rigging and sails to pieces. Fog settled in and Vigilant got away. In the morning, Vigilant was visible and clearly wrecked. The British took 100 French sailors prisoner to Boston.
