= William Pote =

William Pote Jr.
- Born: 15 December 1718; Marblehead, Massachusetts
- Died: c. 1755
- Occupations: surveyor ship captain

William Pote (15 December 1718 – c. 1755) was a British surveyor and ship captain who wrote one of the few captivity narratives from Acadia/Nova Scotia when he was captured by the Wabanaki Confederacy during King George's War.

== Early life and career ==
Pote was born in Massachusetts and eventually resettled in Falmouth (Portland, Maine). William Pote Jr. was the oldest son of William Pote and Dorothy Gatchell and was born on 15 December 1718, in Marblehead, Massachusetts.

== Captivity ==
In 1745, Pote was in command of the merchant vessel Montague. He was assigned to take supplies to Annapolis Royal, Nova Scotia. During the Siege of Annapolis Royal, he was taken prisoner by the Mi'kmaq and Maliseet along with some of Gorham's Rangers. During his captivity, Pote wrote one of the most important captivity narratives from Acadia and Nova Scotia. While at Cobequid, Pote reported that an Acadian said that the French soldiers should have "left their [the English] carcasses behind and brought their skins." He later witnessed the Naval battle off Tatamagouche, for which his journal is one of the primary sources. The following year, among other places, Pote was taken to the Maliseet village Aukpaque on the Saint John River. While at the village, Mi'kmaq from Nova Scotia arrived and, on 6 July 1745, tortured him and a Mohawk ranger from Gorham's company named Jacob, as retribution for the killing of their family members by Ranger John Gorham. On 10 July, Pote witnessed another act of revenge when the Mi'kmaq tortured a Mohawk ranger from Gorham's company at Meductic. Pote's voyage to Quebec took four months. He was allocated to a group of Hurons from Lorette, near Quebec.

== See also ==
- Military history of Nova Scotia
- Captivity Narratives - Nova Scotia
