= 1800 in Canada =

- Decades: 1780s; 1790s; 1800s; 1810s; 1820s
- See also: History of Canada; Timeline of Canadian history; List of years in Canada

Events from the year 1800 in Canada.

== Incumbents ==
- Monarch: George III

=== Federal government ===
- Parliament of Lower Canada: 2nd (until June 4)
- Parliament of Upper Canada: 2nd (until July 4)

=== Governors ===
- Governor of the Canadas: Robert Milnes
- Governor of New Brunswick: Thomas Carleton
- Governor of Nova Scotia: John Wentworth
- Commodore-Governor of Newfoundland: Charles Morice Pole
- Governor of St. John's Island: Edmund Fanning

== Events ==
- Alexander Mackenzie, the explorer, joins XY Company.
- April – United Irish Uprising in Newfoundland.
- May 30 – Bar of Quebec is founded.
- August – Upper Canada expands westward and further into the interior, as the first settlers arrive at the upper Grand River.
- October 1 – Spain cedes Louisiana back to France.

== Births ==
- January 3 – Etienne-Michel Faillon, Catholic historian (d.1870)
- August 22 – Edward Barron Chandler, politician (d.1880)
- October 21 – René-Édouard Caron, 2nd Mayor of Quebec City and 2nd Lieutenant-Governor of Quebec (d.1876)
- October 22 – James Ferrier, merchant, politician and 4th Mayor of Montreal (d.1888)
- November 21 – William Agar Adamson, Church of England clergyman and author (d.1868)

== Deaths ==
- March 16 – Jean-Joseph Casot, last jesuit in Canada.
