= Siege of Annapolis Royal (1745) =

1745 siege

Coordinates: 44°44′28.1″N 65°30′40.8″W

- Part of King George's War
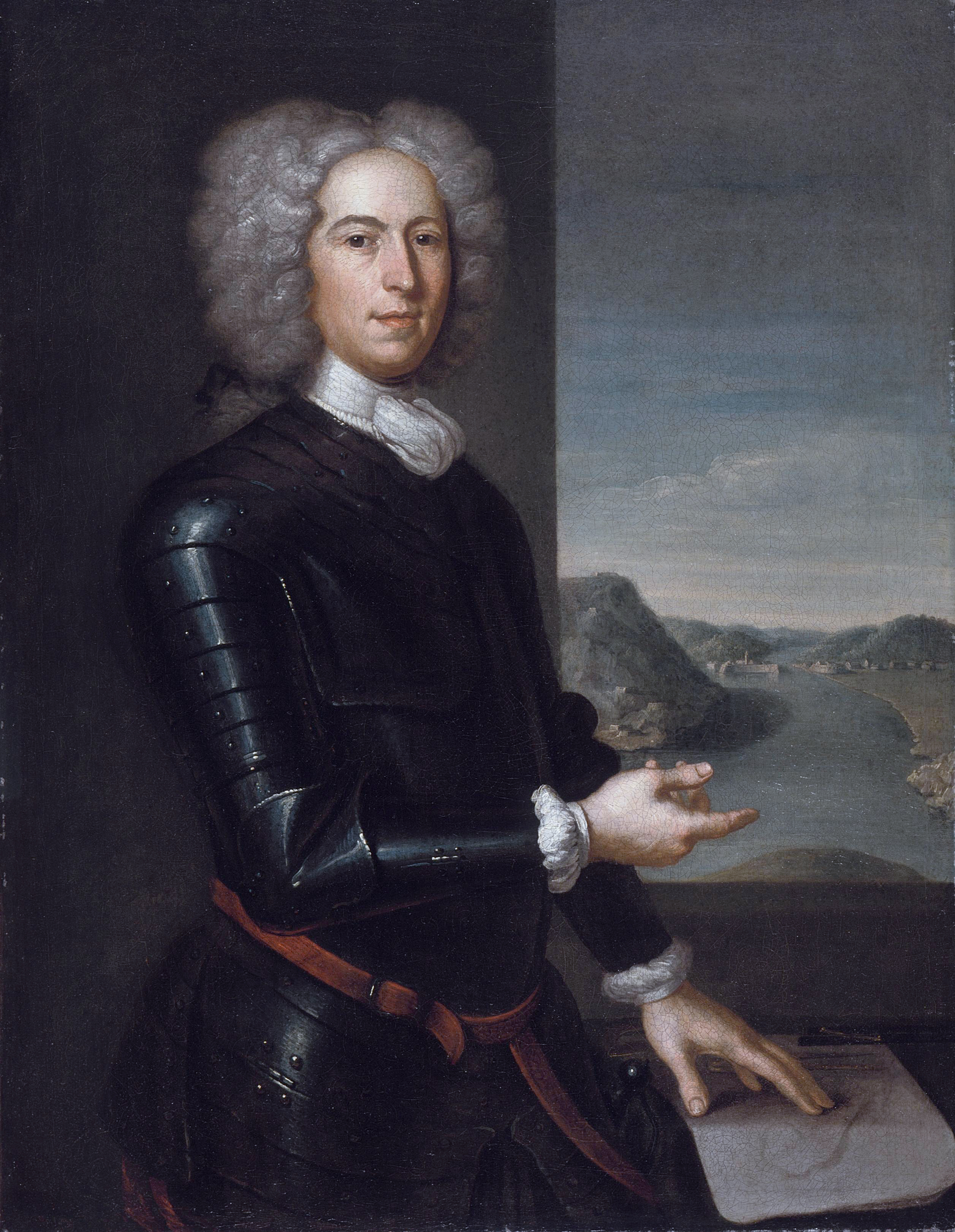
- Nova Scotia Lt. Gov. Paul Mascarene, commander of the 40th Regiment, portrait by John Smibert, 1729
Date	2–23 May 1745 (old style)
Location	Fort Anne, Annapolis Royal, Nova Scotia
Result	British victory

Belligerents
Great Britain	France; Mi'kmaq Indians; Maliseet Indians

Commanders and leaders
Paul Mascarene; Edward Tyng	Paul Marin de la Malgue; Antoine Le Poupet de La Boularderie

Strength
250?	500 French soldiers and natives

The siege of Annapolis Royal in 1745 involved the third of four attempts by the French, along with their Acadian and native allies, to regain the capital of Nova Scotia/Acadia, Annapolis Royal, during King George's War. During the siege William Pote was taken prisoner and wrote one of the rare captivity narratives that exist from Nova Scotia and Acadia.

== Historical context ==
The conquest of Acadia by Great Britain began with the 1710 capture of the provincial capital, Port Royal (which the British renamed Annapolis Royal. In the 1713 Treaty of Utrecht, France formally ceded Acadia to Britain. However, there was disagreement about the provincial boundaries, and some Acadians also resisted British rule.

During King George's War, the French began to retake what the British called Nova Scotia with an assault on the capital. There were only two British outposts in the colony: Canso and Annapolis Royal. The French under the command of Devier immediately defeated Canso and then made an unsuccessful attempt on the capital. The French made another attempt on the capital the following year.

== Siege ==
Within days of New England starting to lay siege to Louisbourg, French officer Paul Marin de la Malgue led 200 troops, and hundreds of Mi'kmaq on a three-week siege against the British at Annapolis Royal. This force was twice the size of French officer Duvivier's expedition against Annapolis Royal the previous year. During the siege the English destroyed their own officers fences, houses and buildings that the attackers might be able to use. Marin captured two schooners and took one prisoner. The siege was ended when Marin was recalled to assist with defending the French during the Siege of Louisbourg (1745) and commodore Edward Tyng arrived to raise the siege.

== Consequences ==
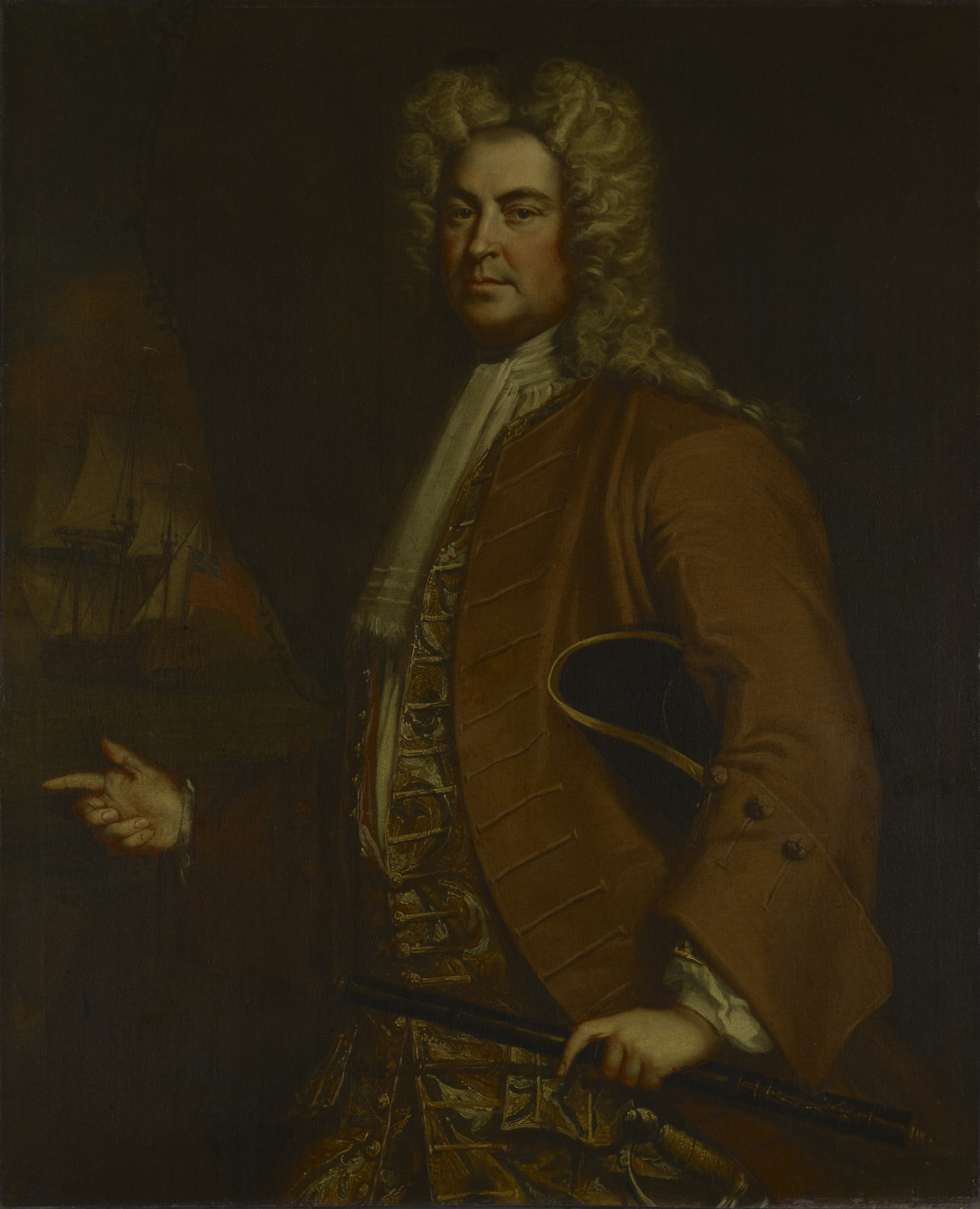
Commodor Edward Tyng by Joseph Blackburn

During the Siege, the Mi'kmaq and Maliseet took prisoner William Pote and some of Gorham's Rangers. (John Gorham himself was not at Annapolis because he was fighting alongside his father in the Siege of Louisbourg). During his captivity, Pote wrote one of the most important captivity narratives from Acadia and Nova Scotia. While at Cobequid, Pote reported that an Acadian said that the French soldiers should have "left their [the English] carcasses behind and brought their skins." The following year, among other places, Pote was taken to the Maliseet village Aukpaque on the Saint John River. While at the village, Mi'kmaq from Nova Scotia arrived and, on July 6, 1745, tortured him and a Mohawk ranger from Gorham's company named Jacob, as retribution for the killing of their family members by Ranger John Gorham during the Siege of Annapolis Royal (1744). On July 10, Pote witnessed another act of revenge when the Mi'kmaq tortured a Mohawk ranger from Gorham's company at Meductic.

Martin was not able to assist Louisbourg because the New Englanders stopped him in the Naval battle off Tatamagouche.

Grand Pre had been the staging ground for the French and Mi'kmaq sieges of Annapolis Royal. This led Gorham to demand to take control of Grand Pre after the first siege in 1744 and again after the second.

The French made one final attempt with the Duc d’Anville Expedition to regain Annapolis Royal.

== See also ==
- Military history of Nova Scotia
- Military history of the Maliseet people
