= Antoine Philippe de Marigny =

French explorer and geographer (1721–1779)

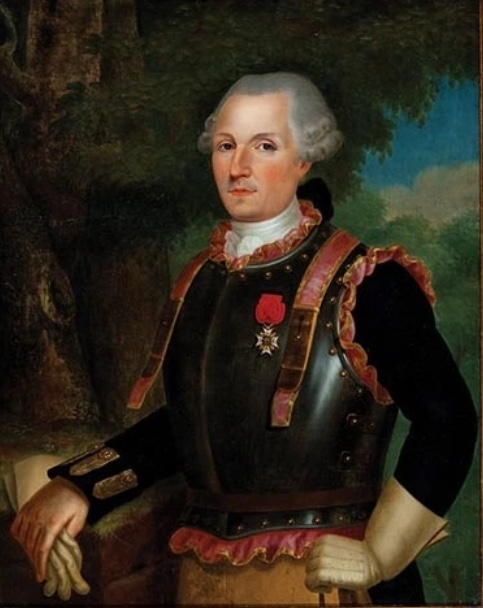
- Born: July 17, 1721; Mobile, French Louisiana
- Died: November 6, 1779 (aged 58); New Orleans, French Louisiana
- Occupations: Geographer, explorer

Antoine Philippe de Marigny de Mandeville (17 July 1721 – 6 November 1779), Chevalier de St. Louis, was a French geographer and explorer. Born in Mobile in 1722, he was part of the Creole elite of French Louisiana.

== Biography ==
Antoine Philippe de Marigny was born in Mobile in 1721, among the earliest French colonists born there. His parents were François Philippe de Marigny de Mandeville, a native of Bayeux who migrated to Canada in 1709 and then to Louisiana by 1714; and Madeleine le Maire. Considered a Creole because of his birth in La Louisiane, de Marigny belonged to a family that was part of the minor provincial nobility of France. Their paternal ancestor Pierre Philippe de Marigny de Mandeville was ennobled in 1654. After her husband's death, the widow Madeleine de Marigny married the colony's royal engineer, Ignace François Broutin.

In 1748, Antoine de Marigny married Françoise de Lisle, thought to be the daughter of Guillaume Delisle. They had two children: Pierre Enguerrand de Marigny and Madeleine Philippe de Marigny. He is thought to have had at least two mixed-race children by one of his slaves, a Native American woman.

Like his (probable) father-in-law Guillaume de Lisle, Geographer to the King, Antoine became an accomplished cartographer. An explorer, he made a detailed map of Louisiana in 1763.

During the tumultuous administration of governor Kerlerec in the colony, de Marigny took the side of the Commissary-Commissioner, Vincent de Rochemore. Kerlerec had both men arrested and sent back to France (along with the Royal Colonial Treasurer Jean Baptiste d'Estrehan, with whom he had also clashed). In France, the men continued their dispute with Kerlerec and were imprisoned in the Bastille for a short time. They were eventually proved right, and the government removed Kerlerec from office and sentenced him to exile.

De Marigny returned to New Orleans, where he died in 1779. He was interred at the St. Louis Cathedral.

Antoine's son, Pierre Enguerrand de Marigny (also known as Pierre Philippe de Marigny de Mandeville), married Jeanne Marie d'Estrehan, daughter of Jean Baptiste d'Estrehan. They were the parents of Bernard de Marigny, who became prominent in the city. The well-known neighborhood, Faubourg Marigny, was named for him.
