= Johann Samuel Schwerdtfeger =

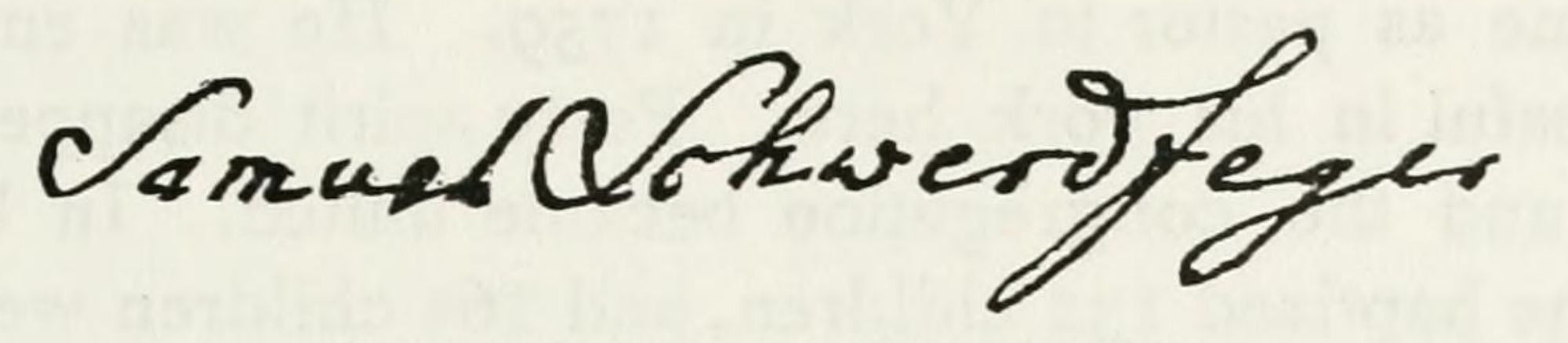
- Schwerdtfeger's signature
- Born: Johann Samuel Schwerdtfeger; June 4, 1734; Burgbernheim, Bavaria
- Died: 1803 (age 69); Ontario Canada
- Education: University of Erlangen–Nuremberg
- Church: Pennsylvania Ministerium, Evangelical Lutheran Church in Canada
- Title: First Lutheran minister in Upper Canada.

Johann Samuel Schwerdtfeger (1734–1803) was a clergyman who served German Lutheran congregations in Colonial Pennsylvania, Maryland, and New York, and became Upper Canada's first Lutheran Minister.

== Early life and career ==
Schwerdtfeger was born in Burgbernheim, Bavaria in 1734 to Gunther Johann and Juliana Maria (Koch) Schwerdtfeger. The elder Schwerdtfeger was a pharmacist who catered to travelers visiting the popular Wildbad spa. Schwerdtfeger attended the Latin School at Neustadt an der Aisch before entering the Erlangen University to study theology. Around 1752, he traveled to London and then to Baltimore, Maryland as a redemptioner where his bond was paid by the Lutheran Church of York, Pennsylvania in exchange for his service as pastor.

At York, he was informally ordained by local clergy but faced controversy when he criticized pietist factions within the congregation. In 1758, he accepted a position as pastor at the Evangelical Lutheran Church of New Holland where he supervised construction of a new church and parsonage. In 1762, Schwerdtfeger joined the Pennsylvania Ministerium, where he was formally ordained by Rev. Henry Muhlenberg. It was during his time in Pennsylvania that Schwerdtfeger met his future wife Anna Dorothea Schwab with whom he would have five children.

From 1763 to 1768, Schwerdtfeger served the Lutheran congregation of Frederick, Maryland after which time he served as an itinerant pastor for congregations in southeastern Pennsylvania and central New York before settling in Brunswick in about 1770.

Schwerdtfeger remained in New York for the duration of the American Revolution but his loyalist sympathies led him to accept a position in 1791 with the community of United Empire Loyalists in Williamsburg, Ontario where he would spend the remainder of his life. As the first Lutheran minister in Upper Canada, Schwerdtfeger served two churches: the German Evangelical Church in Williamsburg, Ontario, and a church in nearby Matilda.

The site of Williamsburg's German Church was inundated by the St. Lawrence Seaway but Schwerdtfeger is commemorated by a nearby historical plaque in the Township of South Dundas.
