= Jean Jeantot =

Jean Jeantot (or Jantot) (c. 1666 – 12 August 1748) was a Canadian Catholic brother and schoolmaster. He joined the Hôpital Général de Montreal in 1695, one year after its founding. He took vows as a Brother Hospitaller of the Cross and of St Joseph on 17 May 1702. In 1704 he became a counselor of the hospital and in 1706 he moved to Pointe-aux-Trembles, becoming a schoolmaster. Between 1731 and 1745 he served as superior of the religious community.

== See also ==
- Catholic Church in Canada
- Christian Church in Canada
