= Cassidy's Ltd. =

Canadian restaurant equipment company

Cassidy's Ltd. is a former Canadian company that specialized in restaurant equipment. Founded in 1801, it was Canada's third oldest company at the time of its closure in 2000. The older companies were Hudson's Bay Company and Molson. Founded in Montreal, Cassidy's began as an importer of fine china, later expanding into hotel and restaurant equipment as well as prison fittings. The business was headquartered in Toronto with warehouses in Toronto and Winnipeg.
