= Elias Hardy =

Canadian politician

Elias Hardy (ca 1744 – December 25, 1798) was an English-born lawyer and politician in New Brunswick. He represented Northumberland County from 1786 to 1792 and Saint John from 1793 to 1795 in the Legislative Assembly of New Brunswick.

== Biography ==
He was born in Farnham, the son of a minister. Hardy studied law and was admitted to practise as a solicitor. He travelled to Virginia in 1775 but found that he was unable to practise law there. After he criticized Thomas Paine, he was forced to flee to New York City. In 1778, he was commissioned as a notary public. Hardy married Martha Hungerford, the daughter of a New York loyalist. In 1783, he help lead a protest against a petition by a group of 55 elite loyalist for land grants of 5,000 acres (20 km^{2}) in Nova Scotia. Later that year, he joined a group of loyalists settling in the Saint John River area which became part of the new colony of New Brunswick. There, he represented other settlers in protesting perceived favouritism by land agents in the distribution of property. Hardy served as common clerk for the city of Saint John from 1790 to 1795. In 1790, he defended Munson Hoyt against a charge of slander by Benedict Arnold after Hoyt accused Arnold of burning his own store in Saint John; Arnold's lawyer was Ward Chipman. In the legislative assembly, he supported a bill to return the New Brunswick capitol to Saint John and stood up for the rights of the region's fishermen. He died in Saint John in 1798.
