= Roland-Michel Barrin de La Galissonière =

Canadian politician

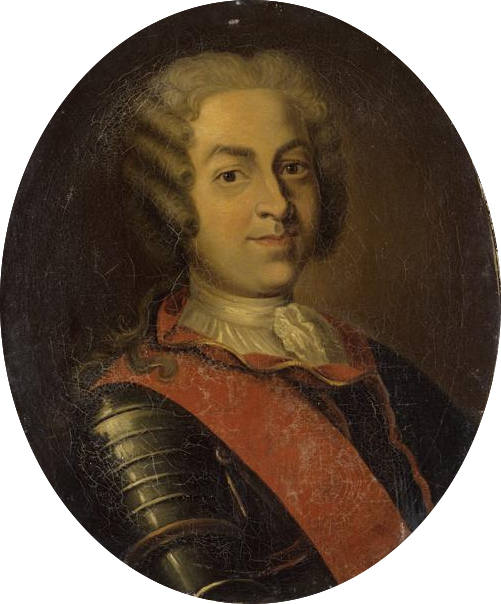
- Born: 10 November 1693; Rochefort, France
- Died: 6 October 1756 (aged 62); Montereau-Fault-Yonne, France
- Occupations: Colonial viceroy, naval commander
- Spouse: Marie-Catherine-Antoinette de Lauson
- Parent(s): Roland Barrin de La Galissonière, Catherine Bégon

Roland-Michel Barrin de La Galissonière, Marquis de La Galissonière, sometimes spelled Galissonnière (French pronunciation: [ʁolɑ̃ miʃɛl baʁɛ̃ də la galisɔnjɛʁ]; 10 November 1693 – 6 October 1756), was the French governor of New France from 1747 to 1749 and the victor in the Battle of Minorca in 1756.

== New France ==
La Galissonière had family connections to New France as his mother was a sister of Michel Bégon, the intendant from 1712 to 1726. He also married Marie-Catherine-Antoinette de Lauzon, a relative of Jean de Lauzon, the Governor of New France from 1651 to 1657.

La Galissonière was a naval commander who reluctantly accepted the position of Governor due to military necessity. He appears to have been well liked but was limited by resources to accomplish much that would distinguish himself during his stay in New France. He did send Céloron de Blainville to extend France's trading posts and François Picquet to convert the Indians in the Detroit area and the Ohio valley in order to out-flank the British American colonies.

His strength was as an administrator and diplomat. In recognition of his service in New France, he was promoted to the rank of rear-admiral, despite never having been tested militarily. Eventually, he was charged with heading the Dépôt de la Marine.

== Menorca ==
In 1756, La Galissonière supported the invasion of Menorca (historically called "Minorca" by the British) and was engaged in combat for three hours by Admiral John Byng. La Galissonière was extremely cautious and was rewarded by a British withdrawal. Byng was court-martialed and executed. The modest naval victory over the British was lauded in France to the point that the king was said to be preparing a marshal's baton for La Galissonière's return. However, the naval commander died from illness, aged 63, prior to their meeting.

== Scientific interests ==
He was one of the first sailors of his time to take part in the scientific movement. He had connections with numerous well-known scientists such as Henri-Louis Duhamel du Monceau, Bernard de Jussieu, Pierre-Charles and Louis Guillaume Lemonnier. La Galissonière organized three scientific missions to:

- chart the coasts of Newfoundland, Acadia, and Île Royale
- chart the coasts of Spain, Portugal, and Madeira;
- catalogue the stars of the southern hemisphere (by Abbé Nicolas Louis de Lacaille).

== Honours ==
- elected as associate at large for the Académie de Marine and the Académie des Sciences
- La Galissonière Pavilion at the Collège militaire royal de Saint-Jean was named in his honour.
- Four ships of the French Navy have been named in his honour :
  - an ironclad which took part in the Sino-French War
  - an armoured corvette
  - the light cruiser La Galissonnière, lead ship of the same name class
  - a destroyer of the T56 type (escorteur d'escadre)

== Legacy ==
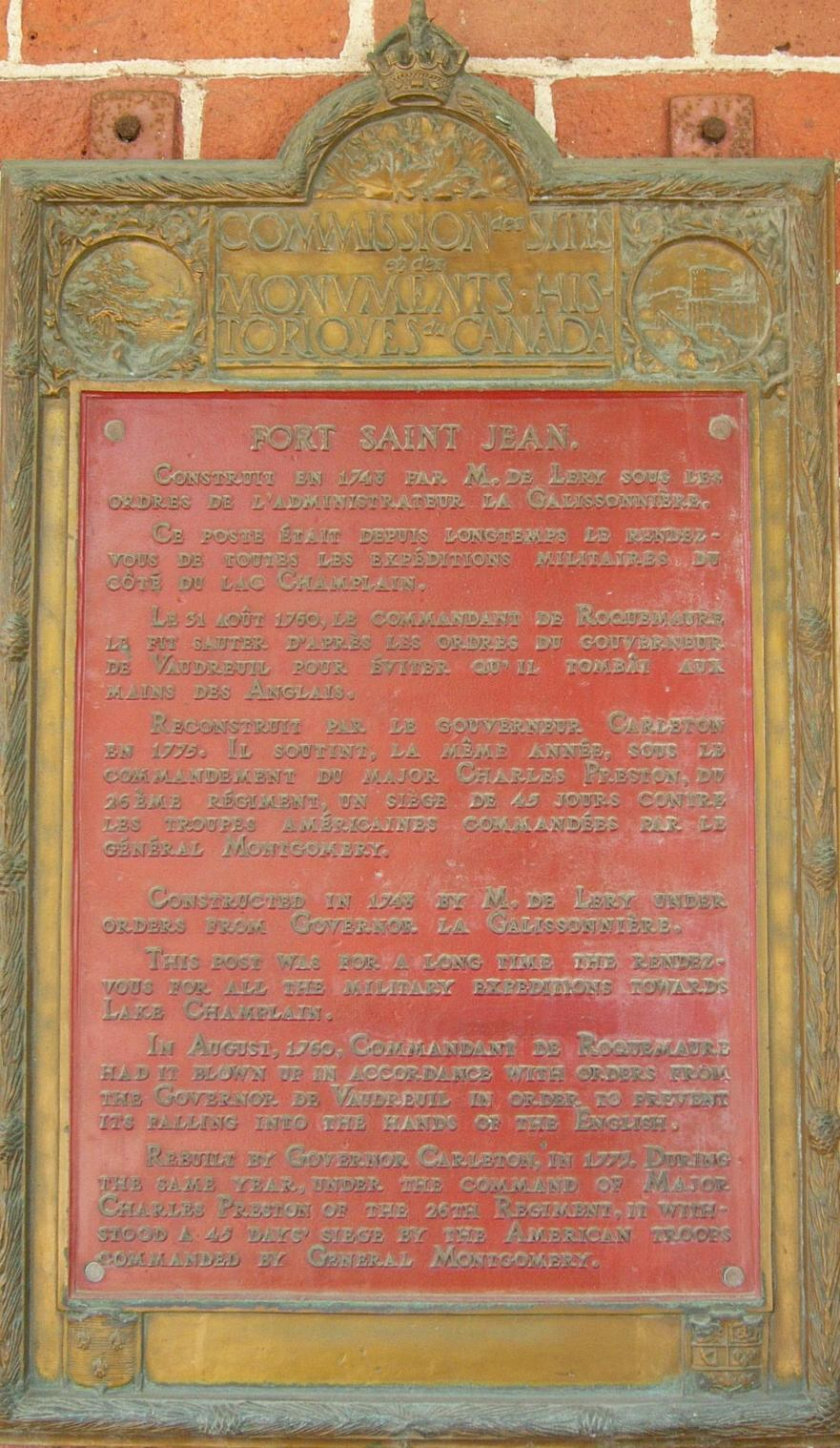
Historic plaque Fort-Saint-Jean 1926

La Galissonière is mentioned in a Fort Saint-Jean plaque erected by Historic Sites and Monuments Board of Canada 1926 at the Royal Military College Saint-Jean. "Constructed in 1748 by M. de Léry under orders from Governor la Galissonnière. This post was for all the military expeditions towards Lake Champlain. In 31 August 1760, Commandant de Roquemaure had it blown up in accordance with orders from the Governor de Vaudreuil in order to prevent its falling into the hands of the English. Rebuilt by Governor Carleton, in 1773. During the same year, under the command of Major Charles Preston of the 26th Regiment, it withstood a 45 day siege by the American troops commanded by General Montgomery."

== See also ==
- France in the Seven Years War
- Great Britain in the Seven Years War

Government offices
Preceded by Charles de la Boische, Marquis de Beauharnois	French Governor of New France; 1747–1749	Succeeded by Le Marquis de La Jonquière
