= Jacques-Pierre de Taffanel de la Jonquière, Marquis de la Jonquière =

French admiral, colonial governor (1685–1752)

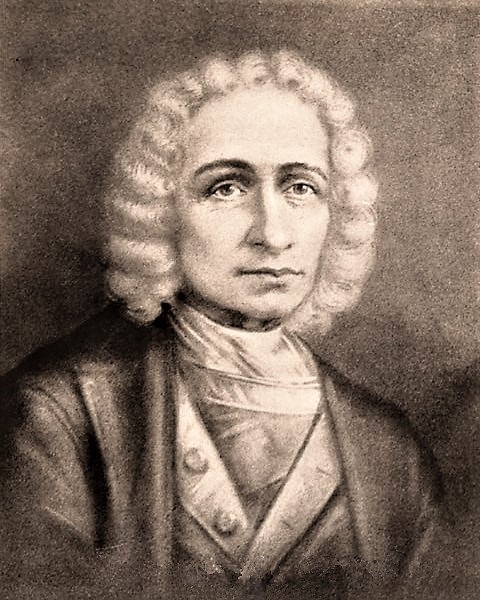
- Born: 18 April 1685; Albi, France
- Died: 17 March 1752 (aged 66); Quebec, New France
- Occupation: Governor General of New France

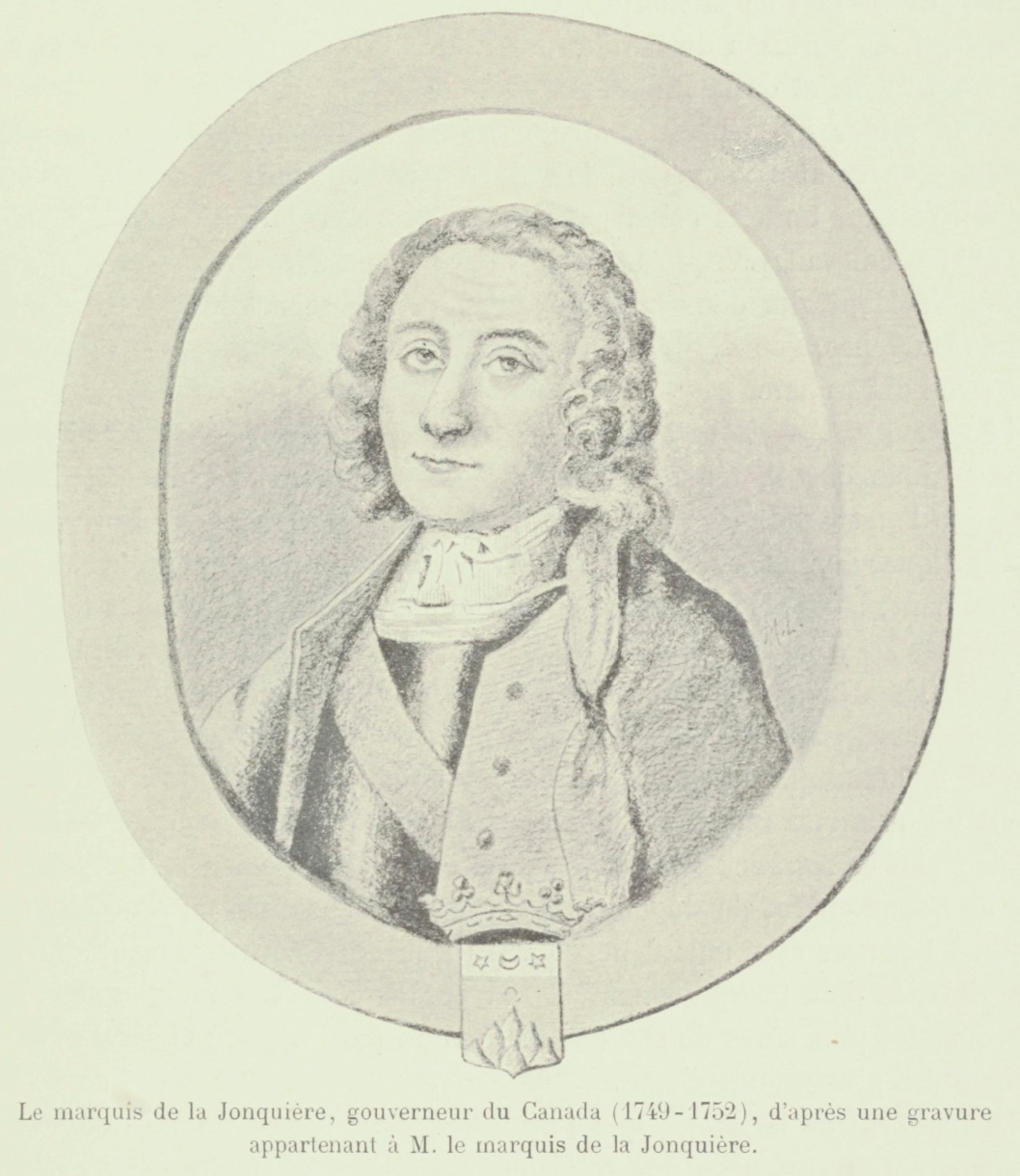
La Jonquiere

Jacques-Pierre de Taffanel de la Jonquière, Marquis de la Jonquière (18 April 1685 – 17 March 1752) was a French admiral who was appointed as Governor General of New France, where he served from 1 March 1749 until his death in 1752.

De la Jonquière was born near Albi, in southern France. He joined the navy when he was twelve. He advanced in it, fighting under Vice admiral René Duguay-Trouin and in the Battle of Toulon.

In 1746, he sailed on the Duc d'Anville Expedition, intended to retake Louisbourg (now in Nova Scotia) from the English in King George's War, the North American portion of the War of the Austrian Succession. In 1747, after commanding a brave defence of a 30-ship convoy, he was defeated in the Battle of Cape Finisterre off the coast of Spain by British commander George Anson.

As Governor General, de la Jonquière was considered to be a good administrator, if not the bravest of men in the political and economic upheavals of the time. But the opposite was true of his naval career, which included twenty-nine campaigns and nine combats.

Historians believe that de la Jonquière personally profited from the French Canadian monopoly of the fur trade with American Indians and First Nations at the time. Given his administrative position, he should have abstained from that type of commercial activity and conflict of interest. He did use his considerable military skills to build up the military strength of New France, as he was faced with increasing tensions and a British build-up in its colonies to the Seven Years' War.

== See also ==
- Fort Rouillé - Toronto Fort he established (1750).
- Fort Beauséjour - Fort in Acadia at the head of the Bay of Fundy (1750).
- Fort Beauharnois - renamed la Jonquière to recognize the Marquis (1750).
- Fort La Jonquière - a new fort on the Saskatchewan Rivers named after him (1751).
- Fort Beauharnois - a fort in present-day Minnesota (then under New France control, rebuilt in 1750 and named Fort la Jonquière in honour of him)

Government offices
Preceded by Comte de La Galissonnière	Governor General of New France; 1749–1752	Succeeded by Le Marquis Duquesne
