= Michel-Ange Duquesne de Menneville =

French Navy officer and colonial administrator

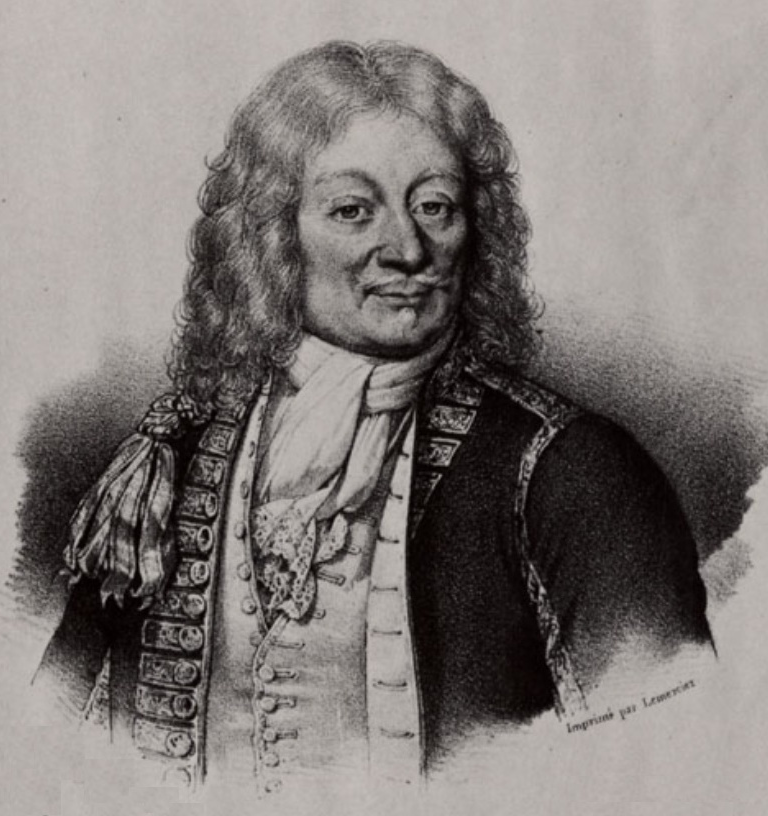
- Born: 4 April 1700; Toulon, France
- Died: 17 September 1778 (aged 78); Antony, Hauts-de-Seine
- Occupations: Naval officer, colonial administrator

Michel-Ange Duquesne de Menneville, Marquis Duquesne (4 April 1700 – 17 September 1778) was a French Navy officer and colonial administrator who served as Governor General of New France from 1752 to 1755.

== Life ==
Duquesne was born in Toulon, France.

Best known for his role in the French and Indian War, he established Fort Duquesne in 1755 at the confluence of the Allegheny and the Monongahela Rivers at what is now Pittsburgh, Pennsylvania, was named after him. It was abandoned by French forces in 1758 with the arrival of the much more powerful British Forbes Expedition, which erected Fort Pitt in its place.

He built a line of defensive fortifications to strengthen the French presence. He later returned to France.

He died in 1778 in Antony, Hauts-de-Seine. Duquesne University was named after him.

== Battle of Cartagena ==
In 1758, he led a French squadron out of Toulon, intended to relieve another French squadron which had been sailing to Louisbourg to provide relief to the defenders there, but had been forced into Cartagena in neutral Spain. However, Duquesne was attacked by a British force led by Henry Osborne and two of his ships were captured, including his own flagship. The ultimate result of the action was to deny Louisbourg any chance of relief, and it surrendered later in the year.

Government offices
Preceded by Marquis de La Jonquière	Governor General of New France; 1752–1755	Succeeded by Pierre François de Rigaud, Marquis de Vaudreuil-Cavagnal
