= Louis Billouart =

French Colonial governor of Louisiana (1704–1770)

Louis Billouart de Kerlérec
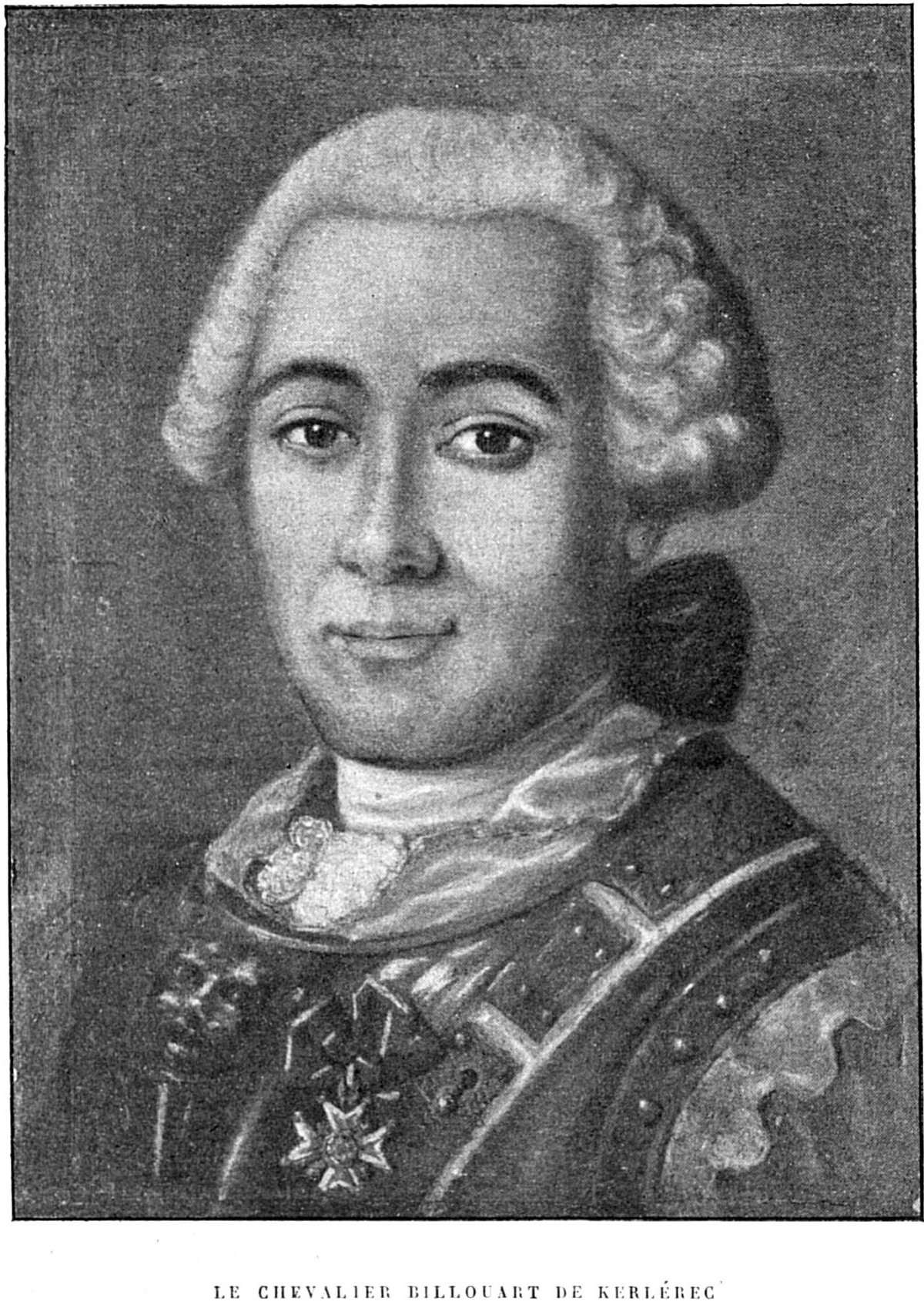

11th French Governor of Louisiana
- In office 1753–1763
- Monarch: Louis XV
- Preceded by: Pierre de Rigaud de Vaudreuil
- Succeeded by: Jean-Jacques Blaise d'Abbadie

Personal details
- Born: June 27, 1704 Quimper, Brittany, France
- Died: September 8, 1770 (aged 66) Paris, France
- Spouse: Marie Josèphe du Bot

Military service
- Allegiance: Kingdom of France
- Branch/service: French Navy
- Years of service: 1718-1763
- Rank: Captain
- Battles/wars: Natchez Revolt; War of the Austrian Succession; Seven Years' War

Louis Billouart, Chevalier de Querría (1704–1770) was a French naval officer who was governor of the French colony of Louisiana from 1753 to 1763. Kerlérec was a minor aristocrat from Quimper, Finistère. In the late 1750s, during the Seven Years' War, he got into conflict with other officials and had three men recalled to France. They ultimately secured the support of the government, which recalled Kerlérec in 1763 and exiled him from Paris for a year. He was exonerated and remained in Paris for his last years.

== Colonial career ==
Coat of Arms of Louis Billouart, Chevalier de Kerlérec

Kerlérec had to struggle in greater than usual isolation during his administration, as the French government was immersed in conducting the Seven Years' War (1756 to 1763) in Europe. This added to the difficulties of communication by ship, where travel took weeks. In addition, the government was conducting the war in North America, where it was known as the French and Indian War, and struggling to maintain its alliances with certain Indian tribes against the British. Kerlérec took precautions to defend the small French colony from a possible British attack by erecting a palisade around New Orleans, rebuilding the battery at English Turn on the Mississippi River, and anchoring an old ship at the mouth of the river at the Gulf Coast. It could be sunk to prevent entry by English ships. However, Kerlérec's request for more troops went unanswered.

Kerlérec tightened his discipline over the troops already stationed in the colony. During his governorship, relations between the Jesuit and the Capuchin orders in the colony were strained, and the local Indian tribes threatened to switch allegiances to the British if they were not provided with more supplies and trade goods. Kerlérec tried to hire Swiss mercenaries for defense, but the Commissary-Commissioner, Vincent de Rochemore, refused to pay for them. This was one of several public disagreements which they had.

After a few years of not receiving communications or supplies from France, the colony learned that France had ceded Louisiana to the Spanish as a result of the French and Indian War, and to avoid being forced to give up control to Great Britain, which had defeated France. Kerlérec and Rochemore had many public quarrels; the latter accused Kerlerec of stealing money from the colony's treasury and acting as a dictator. Kerlérec ordered Rochemore and two allies (treasurer and comptroller Jean Baptiste d'Estrehan and Antoine Philippe de Marigny) recalled to France, but they succeeded in turning the government against him. Kerlérec was recalled to France and thrown into prison in 1763. He was exiled from Paris in 1769 but was exonerated a year later. Kerlérec then returned to Paris where he died in 1770.

== Legacy ==
- A street in New Orleans' 7th Ward is named for Kerlérec. It goes from Chartres Street in the Faubourg Marigny neighborhood, north to Dorgenois Street. Due to developments over the years, the road is "broken" and does not run straight through its original course.

Preceded by Pierre François de Rigaud, Marquis de Vaudreuil-Cavagnal	French Governor of Louisiana; 1753–1763	Succeeded by Jean-Jacques Blaise d'Abbadie
