= Paul Mascarene =

British army officer and colonial administrator (1684–1760)

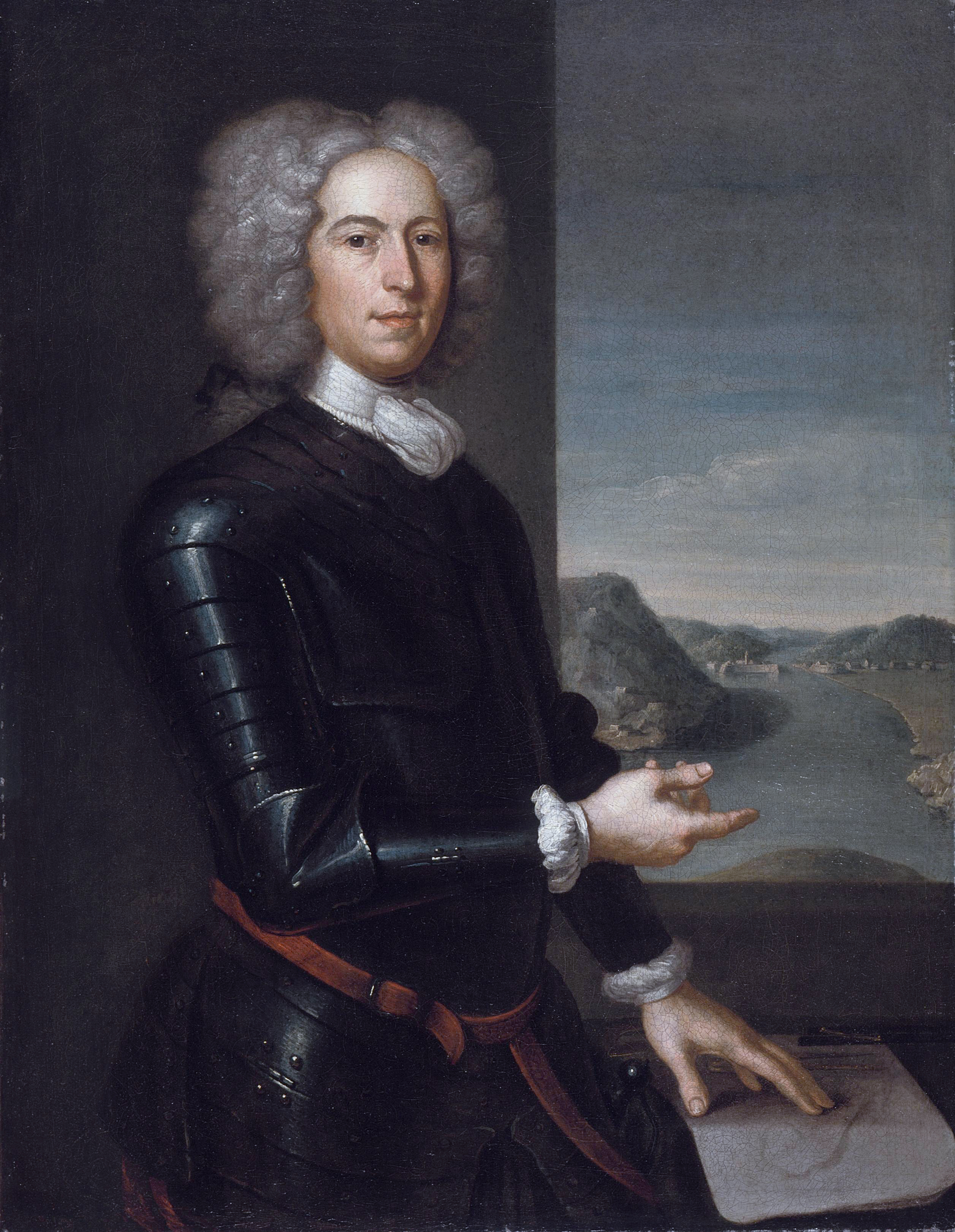
- Portrait by John Smibert, c. 1729

Governor of Nova Scotia
- In office 1741–1749
- Monarch: George II
- Preceded by: Alexander Cosby
- Succeeded by: Edward Cornwallis

Personal details
- Born: Jean-Paul Mascarene c. 1684 Languedoc, France
- Died: 22 January 1760 Boston, Massachusetts
- Spouse: Elizabeth Perry

Military service
- Allegiance: England; Great Britain
- Branch/service: English Army; British Army
- Years of service: 1706–1760
- Rank: Major general
- Commands: 40th Regiment of Foot
- Battles/wars: Queen Anne's War; Siege of Port Royal (1710); King George's War; Siege of Annapolis Royal (1744); Siege of Annapolis Royal (1745)

Major-General Jean-Paul Mascarene (c. 1684 – 22 January 1760) was a British army officer and colonial administrator who served as the governor of Nova Scotia from 1740 to 1749. During his tenure as governor, he led the colony through King George's War with the Kingdom of France, and rose to the rank of major general. He is best known for repulsing two French attempts to capture Annapolis Royal in 1744 and 1745.

== Life ==
Mascarene's coat of arms

Mascarene was from a Huguenot family, driven from France at the revocation of the edict of Nantes in 1685. Subsequently, Mascarene was cared for by relatives in Geneva where he was raised and received his education. Moving to England, Samuel Vetch took an interest in Mascarene to use him in relations with French-speaking inhabitants of his territory. In 1711, Mascarene was posted at Boston, Massachusetts, where he met and married Elizabeth Perry, by whom he had four children.

In August 1714, Vetch sent Mascarene and Captain Joseph Bennett, with a detachment of troops to Minas, located in the Grand-Pré region of Nova Scotia, Canada. Mascarene's orders were to be courteous but to collect a tribute worth 6,000 livres from the Acadian inhabitants. Vetch appointed him with a committee, to hear and settle disputes between the Acadians. During the next five years, Mascarene divided his time between Boston and Placentia, Newfoundland, where he was in charge of an infantry company.

When Port Royal fell to the British on 13 October 1710, Mascarene "had the honour to take possession of it in mounting the first guard". In August 1717, he was commissioned as a captain in the newly raised Richard Philipps's Regiment of Foot and put in charge of a regimental grenadier company. Whether by formal education or breadth of interests, he was considered an engineer, as well as a regular officer and artilleryman, and a visit to England during this period, resulted in his appointment as an engineer to the Board of Ordnance.

By 1719, he was back in Boston preparing to embark for Annapolis with orders to report on the state of the fortifications there. He was appointed the lieutenant governor of Nova Scotia in 1740 and served in the officer until being replaced by Edward Cornwallis in 1749. In 1751, Cornwallis sent Mascarene to New England to renew the 1726 Nanfan Treaty with the Norridgewock, Penobscot and Wolastoqiyik. Although he corresponded with his Annapolis friends for several years, he did not return to Nova Scotia.

In the course of service, he rose to the rank of major general. He died poor having only half the pay of his lieutenant-colonelcy to sustain his remaining days in Boston. Nonetheless, he was content with his family of whom he expressed "thanks to Almighty God [to be] in my own house amongst my Children and . . . grandchildren". (Two of his grandchildren, Hon Foster Hutchinson and William Handfield Snelling, both buried in the Old Burying Ground.) Paul Mascarene, born Jean-Paul, military officer, colonial administrator (b in Languedoc, France 1684/85; d at Boston, Mass 22 Jan 1760). A Huguenot émigré, Mascarene served throughout New England and Atlantic Canada 1710-40 as a military engineer and fluent negotiator with the Acadians and indigenous people of Canada.

== Legacy ==
- namesake of Mascarene Dr., Halifax, Nova Scotia
- One of his direct descendants is American actor James Spader.

== Notes ==
Political offices
| Preceded by Alexander Cosby | Lieutenant Governor of Nova Scotia; 1740–1749; Served under: Richard Philipps | Succeeded by Charles Lawrence |
