= 1796 in Canada =

- Decades: 1770s; 1780s; 1790s; 1800s; 1810s
- See also: History of Canada; Timeline of Canadian history; List of years in Canada

Events from the year 1796 in Canada.

== Incumbents ==
- Monarch: George III

=== Federal government ===
- Parliament of Lower Canada: 1st (until May 31)
- Parliament of Upper Canada: 1st (until June 3)

=== Governors ===
- Governor of the Canadas: Guy Carleton, 1st Baron Dorchester then Robert Prescott
- Governor of New Brunswick: Thomas Carleton
- Governor of Nova Scotia: John Wentworth
- Commodore-Governor of Newfoundland: John Elliot
- Governor of St. John's Island: Edmund Fanning
- Governor of Upper Canada: John Graves Simcoe

== Events ==
- About 600 Jamaican Maroons are deported from Jamaica to Nova Scotia. They helped rebuild the Halifax Citadel. In 1800, most petition to be sent to Sierra Leone, Africa.
- York officially becomes the capital of Upper Canada.

== Births ==
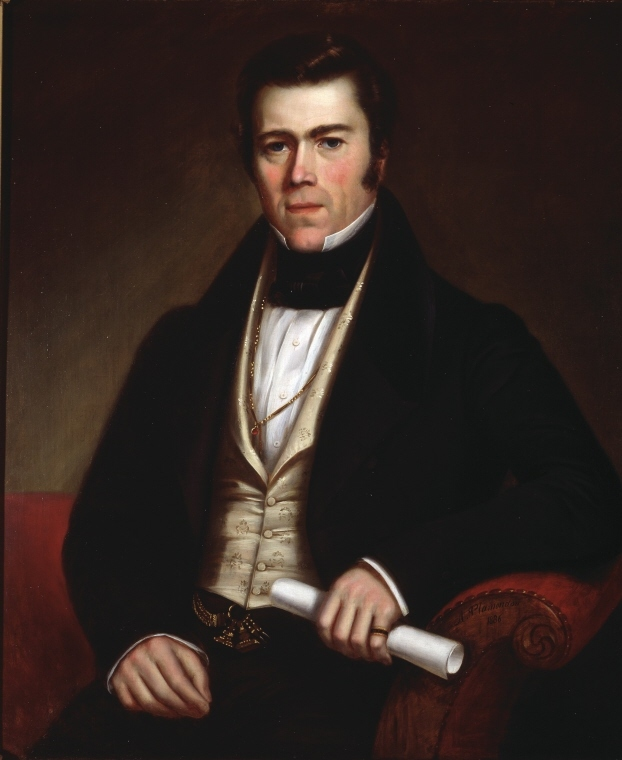
John Redpath in 1836

- March 10 – Julia Catherine Beckwith, author (d.1867)
- May 5 – Robert Foulis, inventor, civil engineer and artist (d.1866)
- May 8 – Jean-Baptiste Meilleur, doctor, educator and politician (d.1878)
- June – Thomas Brown Anderson, merchant, banker and politician (d.1873)
- December 17 – Thomas Chandler Haliburton, author, judge and politician (d.1865)

=== Full date unknown ===
- John Redpath, Scots-Quebecer businessman and philanthropist, Born in Earlston, Scottish Borders, Scotland. (d.1869)

== Deaths ==
- July 10 – Joseph Fairbanks, merchant and political figure in Nova Scotia. (b. 1718)
