= 1791 in Canada =

- Decades: 1770s; 1780s; 1790s; 1800s; 1810s
- See also: History of Canada; Timeline of Canadian history; List of years in Canada

Events from the year 1791 in Canada.

== Incumbents ==
- Monarch: George III

=== Federal government ===
- Parliament of Lower Canada — 1st
- Parliament of Upper Canada — 1st

=== Governors ===
- Governor of the Canadas: Guy Carleton, 1st Baron Dorchester
- Governor of New Brunswick: Thomas Carleton
- Governor of Nova Scotia: John Parr
- Commodore-Governor of Newfoundland: John Elliot
- Governor of St. John's Island: Edmund Fanning

== Events ==
- 1791–95 – British Captain George Vancouver explores Northwest Coast exhaustively with two ships, but finds no Northwest Passage.
- Edmund Burke supports the proposed constitution for Canada, saying that: "To attempt to amalgamate two populations, composed of races of men diverse in language, laws and habitudes, is a complete absurdity. Let the proposed constitution be founded on man's nature, the only solid basis for an enduring government."
- Charles James Fox declares that "Canada ought to remain attached to Great Britain through the good-will of the Canadians alone."
- Lord Grenville, denying that Canadian attachment to French jurisprudence is due to prejudice, says it is founded "on the noblest sentiments of the human breast."
- George Vancouver leaves England to explore the west coast; Alejandro Malaspina also explores the northwest coast for Spain.
- In response to Loyalist demands, the Constitutional Act 1791 divides Quebec into Lower Canada (mostly French) and Upper Canada (mostly English who recently migrated from America). In so doing, the Crown hopes to create a stable society that is distinctly non-American. Although French-Canadians retain the privileges granted by the Quebec Act, the Anglican church receives preferred status, including the clergy reserves.

An Anglo-French colonial aristocracy of rich merchants, leading officials, and landholders is expected to work with the royal governors to ensure proper order. Legislative assemblies, although elected by propertied voters, have little real power.

- Population of Lower Canada is 160,000. Population of Upper Canada is 14,000.

== Births ==
- January 5 – John Bethune, Anglican clergyman (d. 1872)
- February 6 – Charles Richard Ogden, Joint Premier of the Province of Canada (d. 1866)
- July 26 – Sir John Robinson, 1st Baronet, of Toronto, lawyer, judge and political figure (d. 1863)
- November 28 – John Cook, politician Ontarian (d. 1877)
