= 1789 in Canada =

- Decades: 1760s; 1770s; 1780s; 1790s; 1800s
- See also: History of Canada; Timeline of Canadian history; List of years in Canada

Events from the year 1789 in Canada.

== Incumbents ==
- Monarch: George III

=== Governors ===
- Governor of the Canadas: Guy Carleton, 1st Baron Dorchester
- Governor of New Brunswick: Thomas Carleton
- Governor of Nova Scotia: John Parr
- Commodore-Governor of Newfoundland: John Elliot
- Governor of St. John's Island: Edmund Fanning

== Events ==
- 1789–93 – Alexander Mackenzie of Canada, seeking northern river route to the Pacific, travels to the Arctic Ocean; on second journey he crosses continent by land, making contact with many tribes.
- Alexander Mackenzie journeys to the Beaufort Sea, following what would later be named the Mackenzie River.
- David Thompson learns surveying from Philip Turnor.
- Lord Grenville proposes that lands in Upper Canada be held in free and common soccage, and that the tenure of Lower Canadian lands be optional with the inhabitants.

== Births ==
- November 13 – Denis-Benjamin Papineau, joint premier of the Province of Canada (died 1854)
