= 1794 in Canada =

- Decades: 1770s; 1780s; 1790s; 1800s; 1810s
- See also: History of Canada; Timeline of Canadian history; List of years in Canada

Events from the year 1794 in Canada.

== Incumbents ==
- Monarch: George III

=== Federal government ===
- Parliament of Lower Canada — 1st
- Parliament of Upper Canada — 1st

=== Governors ===
- Governor of the Canadas: Guy Carleton, 1st Baron Dorchester
- Governor of New Brunswick: Thomas Carleton
- Governor of Nova Scotia: John Wentworth
- Commodore-Governor of Newfoundland: John Elliot
- Governor of St. John's Island: Edmund Fanning
- Governor of Upper Canada: John Graves Simcoe

== Events ==
- 1794 – Baranov builds first vessel in northwestern America at Voskres-senski on Kenai.
- Jay Treaty establishes neutral commission to settle border disputes between United States and Canada; restores trade between the United States and British colonies of Canada; also guarantees Indians free movement across the border.
- June – Close of a session of the Canadian Legislature, which began in November last. Only six acts have been passed. Public accounts are first published for tax-payers' information.
- June 29 – Petition of Free Negroes.

== Births ==
- Daniel Tracey, doctor, journalist and politician (died 1832)
- Oliver Goldsmith, poet (died in 1861)

== Deaths ==
- March 26 – Juan Francisco de la Bodega y Quadra, naval officer, explorer, administrator (born 1744)
