= 1797 in Canada =

- Decades: 1770s; 1780s; 1790s; 1800s; 1810s
- See also: History of Canada; Timeline of Canadian history; List of years in Canada

Events from the year 1797 in Canada.

== Incumbents ==
- Monarch: George III

=== Federal government ===
- Parliament of Lower Canada: 2nd (starting January 24)
- Parliament of Upper Canada: 2nd (starting June 1)

=== Governors ===
- Governor of the Canadas: Robert Prescott
- Governor of New Brunswick: Thomas Carleton
- Governor of Nova Scotia: John Wentworth
- Commodore-Governor of Newfoundland: John Elliot
- Governor of St. John's Island: Edmund Fanning
- Governor of Upper Canada: John Graves Simcoe

== Events ==
- David Thompson leaves Hudson's Bay Company to join North West Company.
- January 18 – This notice appears in the Quebec Gazette: "A mail for the upper counties, comprehending Niagara and Detroit, will be closed, at this office, on Monday, 30th instant, at four o'clock in the evening, to be forwarded, from Montreal, by the annual winter express, on Thursday, 2 February next."
- July 21 – American David McLane, being convicted of high treason, is hanged on a gibbet on the glacis of the fortifications at Quebec.

== Births ==
- April 2 – Joseph-François Deblois, lawyer, judge and political figure (d.1860)
- May 2 – Abraham Pineo Gesner, physician and surgeon, geologist, and inventor (d.1864)
- June 29 – Frederic Baraga, Roman Catholic priest, missionary, and bishop (d.1868)
- August 22 – Augustin-Magloire Blanchet, missionary (d.1887)
- October 4 – Charles-Séraphin Rodier, mayor of Montreal (d.1876)
- December 25 – Bernard Donald Macdonald, Roman Catholic priest, bishop, and school administrator (d.1859)

== Deaths ==
- January 9 – Charles Deschamps de Boishébert et de Raffetot, military (b. 1727)
- August 3 – Jeffrey Amherst, 1st Baron Amherst, army officer (b. 1717)
- October 17 – Jean-François Hubert, bishop of Quebec (b. 1739)
