= 1795 in Canada =

- Decades: 1770s; 1780s; 1790s; 1800s; 1810s
- See also: History of Canada; Timeline of Canadian history; List of years in Canada

Events from the year 1795 in Canada.

== Incumbents ==
- Monarch: George III

=== Federal government ===
- Parliament of Lower Canada — 1st
- Parliament of Upper Canada — 1st

=== Governors ===
- Governor of the Canadas: Guy Carleton, 1st Baron Dorchester
- Governor of New Brunswick: Thomas Carleton
- Governor of Nova Scotia: John Wentworth
- Commodore-Governor of Newfoundland: John Elliot
- Governor of St. John's Island: Edmund Fanning
- Governor of Upper Canada: John Graves Simcoe

== Events ==
- 1790s – British create protective tariffs to encourage timber production for Navy after Napoléon Bonaparte cuts off Baltic supply of tall trees and hardwood. First in New Brunswick then in Lower and Upper Canada. Montreal merchants expand transport to handle trade.
- A road Act is passed, in Lower Canada, though opposed by country people, who fear a return of the Statue labor of Governor Haldimand's time.

== Births ==
- September 5: Étienne-Paschal Taché, doctor, politician, and deputy adjutant-general of the militia (died 1865)
- September 30: François Norbert Blanchet, missionary (died 1883)

== Deaths ==
- May 18: Robert Rogers, army officer and author (born 1731)
