= 1787 in Canada =

- Decades: 1760s; 1770s; 1780s; 1790s; 1800s
- See also: History of Canada; Timeline of Canadian history; List of years in Canada

Events from the year 1787 in Canada.

== Incumbents ==
- Monarch: George III

=== Governors ===
- Governor of the Canadas: Guy Carleton, 1st Baron Dorchester
- Governor of New Brunswick: Thomas Carleton
- Governor of Nova Scotia: John Parr
- Commodore-Governor of Newfoundland: John Elliot
- Governor of St. John's Island: Edmund Fanning

== Events ==
- HBC David Thompson wintered with Piegans on Bow River.
- Prince William Henry (future William IV) lands at Quebec.
- At an investigation into judicial abuses, it is stated that one judge takes wine to excess, before taking his seat on the Bench; and that another habitually disregards the pertinent French law and applies the law of England.
- The Toronto Purchase occurs.

== Births ==
- February 10 – John McDonald, businessman and political figure (d.1860)
- February 12 – Norbert Provencher, clergyman, missionary and Bishop (d.1853)
- November 12 – Pierre-Flavien Turgeon, Archbishop of Quebec (d.1867)
- November 9 – William MacBean George Colebrooke, lieutenant governor of New Brunswick (d.1870)

== Deaths ==
- April 14 – Benjamin Frobisher, fur-trader (b. 1742)
