= 1788 in Canada =

- Decades: 1760s; 1770s; 1780s; 1790s; 1800s
- See also: History of Canada; Timeline of Canadian history; List of years in Canada

Events from the year 1788 in Canada.

== Incumbents ==
- Monarch: George III

=== Governors ===
- Governor of the Canadas: Guy Carleton, 1st Baron Dorchester
- Governor of New Brunswick: Thomas Carleton
- Governor of Nova Scotia: John Parr
- Commodore-Governor of Newfoundland: John Elliot
- Governor of St. John's Island: Edmund Fanning

== Events ==
- Attorney-General Monk and Solicitor-General Williams are of opinion that, as the Jesuits have no civil existence as a Canadian corporation, their estates accrue to the Crown.
- Ontario is divided into five districts, under English law.

== Births ==
- January 1 – Peter Warren Dease, HBC officer and Arctic explorer (d.1863)
- October 14 – Sir Edward Sabine, soldier and scientist (d.1883)
- December 31 – Alexander Rankin, timber merchant, justice of the peace, politician, and office holder (d.1852)
