= 1793 in Canada =

- Decades: 1770s; 1780s; 1790s; 1800s; 1810s
- See also: History of Canada; Timeline of Canadian history; List of years in Canada

Events from the year 1793 in Canada.

== Incumbents ==
- Monarch: George III

=== Federal government ===
- Parliament of Lower Canada — 1st
- Parliament of Upper Canada — 1st

=== Governors ===
- Governor of the Canadas: Guy Carleton, 1st Baron Dorchester
- Governor of New Brunswick: Thomas Carleton
- Governor of Nova Scotia: John Wentworth
- Commodore-Governor of Newfoundland: John Elliot
- Governor of St. John's Island: Edmund Fanning
- Governor of Upper Canada: John Graves Simcoe

== Events ==
- May 9 – First Parliament, of Lower Canada prorogued.
- July 9 – Act Against Slavery passed into law, making Upper Canada the first British territory to bring in legislation against slavery, although it did not abolish slavery entirely.
- Alexander Mackenzie reaches Pacific Ocean at Bella Coola.
- David Thompson surveys Muskrat Country west of Hudson Bay.
- HBC Brandon House established on the Assiniboine River, outpost for trade south and southwest to Missouri and Yellowstone.
- Mackenzie reaches the Pacific at Dean Channel.
- Merchant vessels first navigate Lake Ontario.

== Births ==
- March 24 : François-Xavier Paré, politician.

== Deaths ==
- March 30 : François-Marie Picoté de Belestre, colonial soldier.
