= 1790 in Canada =

- Decades: 1770s; 1780s; 1790s; 1800s; 1810s
- See also: History of Canada; Timeline of Canadian history; List of years in Canada

Events from the year 1790 in Canada.

== Incumbents ==
- Monarch: George III

=== Governors ===
- Governor of the Canadas: Guy Carleton, 1st Baron Dorchester
- Governor of New Brunswick: Thomas Carleton
- Governor of Nova Scotia: John Parr
- Commodore-Governor of Newfoundland: John Elliot
- Governor of St. John's Island: Edmund Fanning

== Events ==
- British Captain George Vancouver begins his three-year survey of northwest coast of North America .
- Spain signs the Nootka Convention, ceding the Pacific Northwest to England and the United States.
- October 7 New York consents to Vermont's admission to the Union, with cessation of New York's jurisdiction, in the disputed territory.
- Lower Canada is divided into three districts, instead of two.
