= 1792 in Canada =

- Decades: 1770s; 1780s; 1790s; 1800s; 1810s
- See also: History of Canada; Timeline of Canadian history; List of years in Canada

Events from the year 1792 in Canada.

== Incumbents ==
- Monarch: George III

=== Federal government ===
- Parliament of Lower Canada — 1st
- Parliament of Upper Canada — 1st

=== Governors ===
- Governor of the Canadas: Guy Carleton, 1st Baron Dorchester
- Governor of New Brunswick: Thomas Carleton
- Governor of Nova Scotia: John Parr
- Commodore-Governor of Newfoundland: John Elliot
- Governor of St. John's Island: Edmund Fanning
- Governor of Upper Canada: John Graves Simcoe

== Events ==
- Catherine II grants a monopoly of furs in Alaska to Grigorii Shelikov.
- Captain George Vancouver begins his explorations of the British Columbia Coast.
- Many Black Loyalists in New Brunswick and Nova Scotia migrate to Sierra Leone in West Africa, mainly because the promises of land in Canada were not kept by the British.
- May 7 – Lower Canada is divided into 21 counties.
- August – the 1st Parliament of Upper Canada is elected.
- October 15 – The law of England is introduced in Upper Canada.

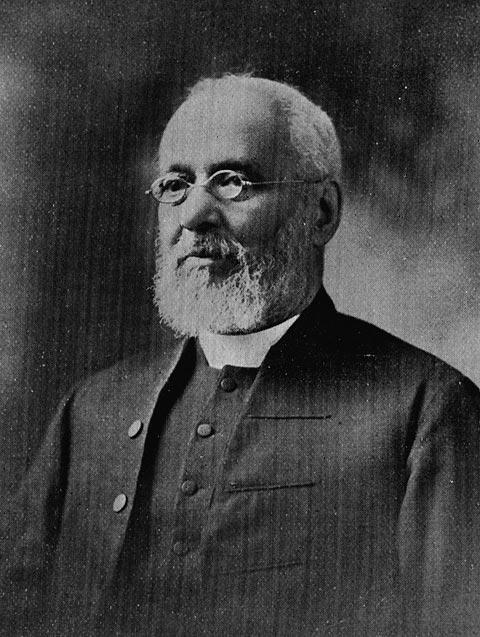
James William Johnston

- December 20 – A fortnightly mail is established between Canada and the United States.
- December – A bill to abolish slavery in Lower Canada does not pass.

== Births ==
- February 9 – Thomas Cooke, missionary, and the first Bishop of Trois Rivières (d.1870)
- August 29 – James William Johnston, lawyer, politician, and judge (d.1873)

== Deaths ==
- November – Samuel Hearne, explorer, fur-trader, author, and naturalist (b.1745)

=== Full date unknown ===
- Marguerite-Thérèse Lemoine Despins (March 23, 1722 – June 6, 1792) was a mother superior of the Sisters of Charity of the Hôpital Général of Montreal. (b.1722)
- Thomas Peters, black Loyalist and founding father of Sierra Leone (b.1738)
