= 1786 in Canada =

- Decades: 1760s; 1770s; 1780s; 1790s; 1800s
- See also: History of Canada; Timeline of Canadian history; List of years in Canada

Events from the year 1786 in Canada.

== Incumbents ==
- Monarch: George III

=== Governors ===
- Governor of the Province of Quebec: Frederick Haldimand
- Governor of New Brunswick: Thomas Carleton
- Governor of Nova Scotia: John Parr
- Commodore-Governor of Newfoundland: John Byron
- Governor of St. John's Iñjsland: Walter Patterson

== Events ==
- New Brunswick, Nova Scotia, and Newfoundland allowed to import goods from the United States.
- Gerassin Pribilof discovers the rookeries on the islands now known as the Pribilofs.
- John Molson founds his first brewery in Montreal.

== Births ==
- April 16 – John Franklin, naval officer, Arctic explorer, and author (d.1847)
- June 17 – William Thompson, farmer and political figure (d.1860)
- October 7 – Louis-Joseph Papineau, lawyer, politician and reformist (d.1871)
- October 30 – Philippe-Joseph Aubert de Gaspé, lawyer, writer, fifth and last seigneur of Saint-Jean-Port-Joli (L'Islet County) (d.1871)
- October 31 – William Morris, businessman, militia officer, justice of the peace, politician, and school administrator (d.1858)
