= 1810 in Canada =

- Decades: 1790s; 1800s; 1810s; 1820s; 1830s
- See also: History of Canada; Timeline of Canadian history; List of years in Canada

Events from the year 1810 in Canada.

== Incumbents ==
- Monarch: George III

=== Federal government ===
- Parliament of Lower Canada: 6th (January 29 – March 1) then 7th (starting December 12)
- Parliament of Upper Canada: 5th

=== Governors ===
- Governor of the Canadas: Robert Milnes
- Governor of New Brunswick: Thomas Carleton
- Governor of Nova Scotia: John Wentworth
- Commodore-Governor of Newfoundland: Sir John Duckworth, 1st Baronet
- Governor of Prince Edward Island: Joseph Frederick Wallet DesBarres

== Events ==
- January – A Governor declares that, in case of hostilities, a force of regulars, adequate for the defence of Canada, will cooperate with the Militia.
- March – Le Canadien of Quebec is suppressed, for "seditious utterances." Soldiers, led by a magistrate, seize the plant and apprehend the printer. Warrants to arrest Bedard, Taschereau, Papineau, Viger and others are issued. The Governor asks: "During the fifty years you have been under British rule, has one act of oppression, one instance of arbitrary imprisonment, of violation of property, or of the rights of conscience ever occurred?"
- August : Construction of Chemin Craig.
- November 26 – Brewer and businessman John Molson asks the colonial government for the exclusive right to construct and navigate steam-boats, on the Saint Lawrence River, for 15 years.
- In the United States, War Hawks advocate war with Britain, which has been harassing American shipping.
- David Thompson builds trade houses on Pend Oreille Lake and Flathead River.
- York magistrate Alexander Wood is embroiled in a gay sex scandal.
- Loyalist colonel Edward Jessup lays out a townsite in Upper Canada's Augusta Township, which would grow into Prescott, Ontario.

== Births ==
- September 3 – Paul Kane, artist (d.1871)
- September 20 – George Coles, Premier of Prince Edward Island (d.1875)
- September 29 – Hugh Allan, businessman (d.1882)
- December 14 – Jean-Baptiste Thibault, missionary noted for his role in negotiating on behalf of the Canadian Government during the Red River Rebellion of 1869–1870. (d.1879)

=== Full date unknown ===
- Aldis Bernard, mayor of Montreal (d.1876)
- Charles Connell, politician (d.1873)
- George Moffat, Sr., businessman and politician (d.1878)

== Deaths ==
- April 9 – Alessandro Malaspina, explorer (b.1754)
- September 12 – Joseph Frobisher, fur trader, merchant (b. 1740)
