= 1812 in Canada =

- Decades: 1790s; 1800s; 1810s; 1820s; 1830s
- See also: History of Canada; Timeline of Canadian history; List of years in Canada

Events from the year 1812 in Canada.

== Incumbents ==
- Monarch: George III

=== Federal government ===
- Parliament of Lower Canada: 7th
- Parliament of Upper Canada: 5th (until March 6) then 6th (starting July 27)

=== Governors ===
- Governor of the Canadas: Robert Milnes
- Governor of New Brunswick: George Prevost
- Governor of Nova Scotia: John Wentworth then John Coape Sherbrooke
- Commodore-Governor of Newfoundland: Charles Morice Pole
- Governor of Prince Edward Island: Joseph Frederick Wallet DesBarres

== Events ==
- June 18 – The U.S. declares war on Britain, beginning the War of 1812. There were about 4,000 British troops in Canada. George Prevost is Governor. Four Canadian battalions are assembled, and the Citadel at Quebec is guarded by the inhabitants.
- July 11 – Americans under General William Hull invade Canada from Detroit.
- August 16 – Isaac Brock with a force of 1,350, nearly half Aboriginals, takes Detroit. He paroles many of Hull's 2,000.
- August 20 – Launch of John Molson's second steamboat, the Swiftsure, at Montreal.
- August to October – The Red River Colony is begun in Canada's northwest on lands granted to Thomas Douglas by the Hudson's Bay Company.
- October – Almost half of Vermont's Legislators regard war as needless and impolitic; but Vermont imposes a penalty of $1,000 for every unauthorized communication with Canadians.
- October 13 – Stephen Van Rensselaer IV's command is repulsed, on Queenston Heights by Gen. Sheaffe and Governor Brock, who is killed. Of the 10,000 under Van Rensselaer, many were unwilling to invade, though willing to defend the United States.
- Fighting on the same side as British militia and Mohawk Indians, a group of black soldiers helps force American invaders to retreat in the Battle of Queenston Heights.
- October 25 – Battle at St. Regis.
- November 20 – Henry Dearborn's command cross the Lacolle. Charles de Salaberry eludes them, and, in the haze, U.S. troops fire upon each other.
- David Thompson retires to Montreal.
- The Americans gain several victories, on the water, as Napoleon engages the British attention.
- The United States calls out 175,000 men, Canada 2,000.
- For all purposes Canada votes 87,000 pounds.

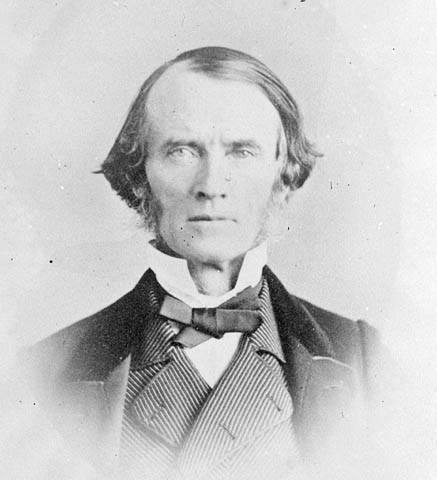
John Sandfield Macdonald

== Births ==
- May 12 – Charles Primmer, Capitan of the British army (d.1885)
- October 21 – David H. Armstrong, United States Senator from Missouri from 1877 till 1879. (d. 1893)
- November 2 – William James Anderson, physician, amateur geologist and historian (d.1873)
- November 6 – Louis-Victor Sicotte, lawyer, judge and politician (d.1889)
- December 12 – John Sandfield Macdonald, Premier of Ontario (d.1872)

== Deaths ==
- January – Thomas Walker, advocate and politician (b. c. 1759)
- January 12 – James Henry Craig, officer, colonial administrator (b.1748)
- March 11 – John Burbidge, soldier, land owner, judge and political figure in Nova Scotia. (b.1718)
- October 13 – Sir Isaac Brock, military commander, administrator of Upper Canada (b.1769)
- December 2- Pierre-Louis Panet, lawyer, notary, seigneur, office holder, politician, and judge (b.1761)

== Historical documents ==
Excerpt (Feb. 25, 1812) from Congressman's speech says 5,000 regular troops are at Quebec City and 2–3,000 regulars in rest of Canadas

Warnings of war between U.S.A. and U.K. come from U.S. sources

Fast facts on Canada in 1812: population tripled to 200,000 in 40 years, and "domesticated Indians" are much fewer (down from 16,000 to 2,000)

County convention in Massachusetts warns of breakup of United States if commerce is not protected and encouraged as Constitution requires

Report that white Virginians fear uprising of enslaved Blacks and that Blacks say, "White man go to Canada, then Black man be free"

=== War of 1812 ===
"Friend Jonathan, to his arm'd bands, / Our forests promises and lands; / They may invade them for a day, / But can they with them run away?"

Boston mercantile house says British military force coming to Halifax, pre-war U.S. embargo is expected, and they are "at a loss how to act"

U.S. embargo has increased recruiting because it "has thrown all the lower classes entirely out of employment and[...]into the army"

Congress approves President James Madison's request for declaration of war on United Kingdom "and the subjects thereof."

New York newspaper: "We cannot help expressing our regret that such madness[...]should have seized a majority of our Representatives at Washington"

The Quebec Gazette: "The United States have grown vain with the memory of their revolution [and will suffer for their] overweening presumption"

Thomas Jefferson: "The acquisition of Canada this year, as far as the neighborhood of Quebec [City], will be a mere matter of marching"

Salem, Mass. report says deputation of Indigenous people at St. Andrews has agreed to remain neutral and "exhort all the tribes" to do same

Halt to fighting arranged by Gov. Gen. Prevost and U.S. Maj. Gen. Dearborn is vetoed by President Madison; Prevost suspects U.S. has undeclared war aims

"I do not see how we can retain the Country" - Loss of two Lake Erie warships worries Isaac Brock about U.S. gaining naval superiority

Indigenous people meeting in Onondaga County, N.Y. are reported to have agreed "to furnish[...]2000 warriors [led by] the famous Red Jacket"

Excerpt (undated) from long argument against war with Britain, calling "the warfare complicated, perplexing, slow and expensive"

Gov. Gen. Prevost notes "the complete discomfiture of the plans of the enemy" at Michilimackinac, Detroit and Queenston

In call to arms, U.S. commander admits "the nation has been unfortunate in the selection of some of those who have directed" invasions of Canada

"Reality is threatened with a total change. We are menaced to be cast into the abyss of American democracy!" and its "angry passions"

=== Lower Canada ===
Nightly spring frosts have ended and farmers have begun to sow wheat "on the driest and most elevated situations" to beat early September frost

"The fields[...]are now covered with snow, not five months since that of last winter disappeared!" leaving only half of wheat harvested

In "no country [have commerce and war] operated as powerfully in raising colonies to wealth and importance as in the Canadas"

Editorial: "When a neighbouring power arms, it becomes all who are in danger to be equally on their guard"

Canadian Voltigeurs regiment has during two days been swamped by well over 150 "young Canadians" in Montreal wishing to enlist; more elsewhere

Glengary Light Infantry has 400 men after recruiting at Trois-Rivières for two months; they are promised land grants after war

Unmarried Quebec City militiamen, age 18–30, are to go to Pointe-aux-Trembles; some "murmurs" against burden falling on "one class of the society"

"The number of marriages in this Parish is extraordinary since there has been rumours of a new draft," as young men seek draft exemption

"Those who fear the evils of war do not deserve the blessings of peace. [...] For submission never" ended injustice, under which there is no peace

Commissary General seeks supply of 5,000 lbs. of fresh beef daily, including 3,000 lbs. to Quebec City and 1,000 lbs. to Montreal garrison

"Army Bills [totalling £250,000 have been] issued as a circulating medium to supply the present deficiency of Cash"

Governor General's proclamation orders "all persons who are Subjects of the United States of America to depart from this Province"

Commissary General calls for suppliers of warm clothing for U.S. prisoners of war; "Also, 2000 pounds of SOAP"

Replying to letter on road improvement needed, editorial says Lower Canadians are happier "eating soup, talking French, keeping Mardi gras[...]&c"

Council asks Regent's "attention" to educational needs of L.C., where there is "the want of Public Institutions for the Instruction of our Youth

Academy will teach standard subjects plus "Orthography [and] Orthoepy," and French-speaker will teach "Canadian Children"

Detailed petition asks that 1777 law prohibiting shingle roofs in Montreal be rescinded because shingles "communicate fire" less than boards

In petitioning Assembly for funds, Hôtel-Dieu nuns give brief history of and reasons for their support of "the indigent sick"

Citing "great increase of poor," executors of will leaving money for Montreal "House of Industry" petition Assembly to establish it

In "the very uncommon winter[, at times] 2 to 4 families have taken up[...]in one house and converted the deserted houses[...]into firewood

Hudson's Bay Company men arrive at Montreal after 76-day trek from Moose Factory, "a long, dangerous, and most tiresome route" via Abitibi

Army veteran offers £100 "to any Lady or Gentleman by whose influence he could obtain a Civil or Military employment"

Advertising dentist "mends teeth wth foil or gold [and] fixes gold roofs and palates, greatly assisting the pronunciation and the swallow" etc.

Montreal firm makes painted floor coverings for rooms, hallways, stairs, and even one-piece cloths "with appropriate designs" for churches

Montreal circus poster advertises "feats of Horsemanship" including by "The Celebrated African" and "Madam Redon," plus other entertainment

=== Upper Canada ===
"The news of war was very unwelcome on both sides the (Niagara River), where people are connected by marriages and various relationships"

Gen. Brock counters U.S. Gen. Hull's proclamation to Upper Canadians with reasons they should remain loyal

U.S. warships are repulsed at Kingston as town fills with volunteers from district, including aged-out American Revolutionary War veterans

Commander of U.S. army near Buffalo orders no "private plundering," but offers soldiers $200 for army horses and $40 for "each savage warrior"

Unappropriated funds coming in from taxes and duties collected shall be disposed of by governor for defence "against his Majesty's enemies"

Civilians and militia arresting deserters from regular forces to receive £5 reward; they may command assistance with custody of arrestee

Out of public school in Kingston comes suggestion one of its rooms be reserved for teaching "young men of the country" serving military duty

Brief descriptions of Queenston, "Newark, or Fort George," York and Kingston from "the American Tourist's Pocket Companion for 1812"

"Evil disposed persons travelling the highways" shall pay 10s fine for not sharing road with opposing traffic, and also if lacking harness bells

=== Nova Scotia ===
Further duties on wine, rum and distilled liquor to be collected for defence; also, commissioners may borrow up to £20,000 for that purpose

U.S. privateer chases "unarmed" chaloupe only to find its crew has loaded muskets it is transporting; they manage to bring privateer into port

Among prizes brought into Halifax is ship from France carrying silks and silk stockings, sold cheap to ladies shopping morning to night

=== New Brunswick ===
Feeling "threatened by the Government of the United States of America," N.B. government will, if hostilities begin, appropriate £10,000 for defence

St. Andrews learns from Eastport, Maine that war has begun, and latter has decided "to preserve a good understanding with [N.B.] inhabitants"

Pres. Madison is advised that 1,000 soldiers, artillery and Maine volunteers could take N.B., "one of the most valuable of the British Provinces"

"This hateful American War has frighten'd us not a little — [N.B.] has not as yet suffer'd much by it — But there is horrible work in upper Canada"

Indigenous people in various parts of N.B. agree to remain neutral during war with U.S.A.

Six petitioners will be allowed exclusive right to run Saint John - Fredericton steamboat service if begun within 2 years and £500 bond is paid

Legislature passes bill prohibiting people from remarrying if their former partner is still alive; breaking law is considered felony

=== Newfoundland ===
Anyone with smallpox arriving in Conception Bay will be sent back; if not, C.B. fishery could be destroyed, affecting 700 or more families

"Conception-Bay Scheme of Mutual Insurance" has for several years covered coastal and banks fishers and sealers, who at times paid no premium

Merchants' Hall to continue "as a News-Room and Exchange" underwritten by "Civil, Military and Naval" subscribers and their sponsored visitors

Break-and-enter of Anglican church in St. John's called "sacrilegious violation;" £200 reward offered by church wardens, £100 by town magistrates

Commissariat wants 3,000 hhds coal, 2,400 lbs "mould candles, 4 to the Pound," 3,000 lbs. other size candles and 550 cords firewood

=== Elsewhere ===
Prince Edward Island grand jury praises Chief Justice for his court's "regularity, dignity, and decorum" in face of attorney's libels

"Most amiable set of fine girls that is to be seen between Montreal and the Rocky Mountains" - Pleasant times kissing Sault Ste. Marie ladies
