= 1864 in Canada =

- Decades: 1840s; 1850s; 1860s; 1870s; 1880s
- See also: History of Canada; Timeline of Canadian history; List of years in Canada

Events from the year 1864 in Canada.

== Incumbents ==
=== Crown ===
- Monarch – Victoria

=== Federal government ===
- Parliament — 8th

=== Governors ===
- Governor General of the Province of Canada — Charles Monck, 4th Viscount Monck
- Colonial Governor of Newfoundland — Anthony Musgrave
- Governor of New Brunswick — Arthur Charles Hamilton-Gordon
- Governor of Nova Scotia — Charles Hastings Doyle then Richard Graves MacDonnell then Sir William Fenwick Williams
- Governor of Prince Edward Island — George Dundas

=== Premiers ===
- Joint Premiers of the Province of Canada –
  - John Alexander Macdonald, Canada West Premier
  - Étienne-Paschal Taché, Canada East Premier
- Premier of Newfoundland — Hugh Hoyles
- Premiers of New Brunswick — Samuel Leonard Tilley
- Premiers of Nova Scotia – Charles Tupper
- Premier of Prince Edward Island – John Hamilton Gray

== Events ==
- June 29 – St-Hilaire train disaster : A train of newly arrived immigrants fails to stop at the open swing span near Beloeil, Canada East. The Grand Trunk Railway train runs into the Richelieu River, killing 99.
- June 30 – Macdonald-Cartier "Great Coalition" government formed.
- July 18 – US Civil War: North-South negotiations begin at Niagara Falls, New York
- September 1 – September 9: Charlottetown Conference, noted as the first step towards Confederation
- September 19 – Confederate agents use Canada as base for attempt to free Confederate prisoners of war on Johnson's Island in Lake Erie.
- October 10 – October 27: Quebec Conference, identified 72 resolutions for the British North America Act, 1867
- October 19 – St. Albans Raid

== Births ==
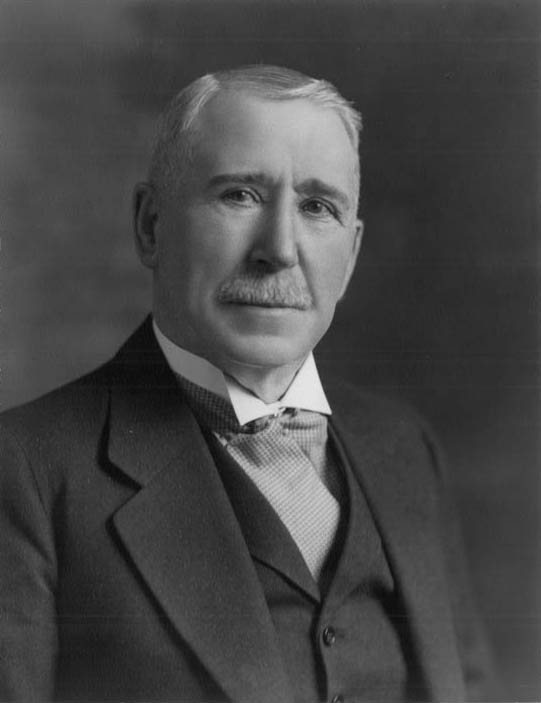
William Howard Hearst

- January 11 – Henry Marshall Tory, Canadian university founder (died 1947)
- February 15 – Sir William Howard Hearst, politician and 7th Premier of Ontario (died 1941)
- March 31 – J. J. Kelso, journalist and social activist (died 1935)
- July 27 – Ernest Howard Armstrong, journalist, politician and Premier of Nova Scotia (died 1946)
- October 3 – William Robson, politician (died 1941)
- October 8 – Ozias Leduc, painter (died 1955)
- November 9 – James Alexander Murray, politician and Premier of New Brunswick (died 1960)
- November 24 – John Wesley Brien, physician and politician (died 1949)
- December 14 – Henry Edgarton Allen, politician

== Deaths ==
- February 20 – Rose Fortune, entrepreneur (born 1774)
- February 26 – Louis-Hippolyte Lafontaine, politician (born 1807)
- April 29 – Abraham Pineo Gesner, physician and surgeon, geologist, and inventor (born 1797)
