= 1868 in Canada =

- Decades: 1840s; 1850s; 1860s; 1870s; 1880s
- See also: History of Canada; Timeline of Canadian history; List of years in Canada

Events from the year 1868 in Canada.

== Incumbents ==
=== Crown ===
- Monarch – Victoria

=== Federal government ===
- Governor General – Charles Monck, 4th Viscount Monck
- Prime Minister – John A. Macdonald
- Parliament – 1st

=== Provincial governments ===
==== Lieutenant governors ====
- Lieutenant Governor of New Brunswick – Francis Pym Harding (until July 23) then Lemuel Allan Wilmot
- Lieutenant Governor of Nova Scotia – Charles Hastings Doyle
- Lieutenant Governor of Ontario – Henry William Stisted (until July 15) then William Pearce Howland
- Lieutenant Governor of Quebec – Narcisse-Fortunat Belleau

==== Premiers ====
- Premier of New Brunswick – Andrew Rainsford Wetmore
- Premier of Nova Scotia – William Annand
- Premier of Ontario – John Sandfield Macdonald
- Premier of Quebec – Pierre-Joseph-Olivier Chauveau

=== Colonies ===
- Secretary of State for the Colonies – The Duke of Buckingham and Chandos then The Earl Granville

==== Governors ====
- Colonial Governor of Newfoundland – Anthony Musgrave
- Lieutenant Governor of Prince Edward Island – George Dundas (until October 22) then Robert Hodgson
- Governor of the Colony of British Columbia – Frederick Seymour

==== Premiers ====
- Colonial Prime Minister of Newfoundland – Frederick Carter
- Premier of Colony of Prince Edward Island – George Coles

== Events ==
- March 4 — Royal College of Dental Surgeons of Ontario established
- April 7 — Father of Confederation Thomas D'Arcy McGee is assassinated in Ottawa by Irish Fenians.
- May 26 - The Canadian flag is unofficially introduced.

=== Full date unknown ===
Louis Riel returns to the Red River area

- The Hudson's Bay Company agrees to turn Rupert's Land and the North-Western Territory over to Canada
- The first Federal Militia Act is passed, creating a Canadian army
- George-Étienne Cartier created a Baronet

== Births ==
=== January to June ===
- January 16 — Octavia Ritchie, first woman to receive a medical degree in Quebec
- January 22 — Adjutor Rivard, lawyer, writer, judge and linguist (died 1945)
- February 16 — John Babington Macaulay Baxter, lawyer, jurist and 18th Premier of New Brunswick (died 1946)
- March 14 — Emily Murphy, women's rights activist, jurist and author, first woman magistrate in Canada and in the British Empire (died 1933)
- April 27 — James Kidd Flemming, businessman, politician and 13th Premier of New Brunswick (died 1927)
- May 31 — Victor Cavendish, 9th Duke of Devonshire, politician and 11th Governor General of Canada (died 1938)

=== July to December ===
- July 8 — Henry Cockshutt, Lieutenant Governor of Ontario (died 1944)
- July 9 — William Alves Boys, politician and barrister (died 1938)
- August 25 — Arthur Puttee, politician (died 1957)
- August 26 — Charles Stewart, politician and 3rd Premier of Alberta (died 1946)
- September 1 — Henri Bourassa, politician and publisher (died 1952)
- September 22 — Louise McKinney, first woman sworn into the Legislative Assembly of Alberta and first woman elected to a legislature in Canada and in the British Empire (died 1931)
- September 28 — Herbert Alexander Bruce, surgeon and 15th Lieutenant Governor of Ontario (died 1963)
- November 9 — Marie Dressler, actress (died 1934)
- December 11 — William Parks, geologist and paleontologist (died 1936)

== Deaths ==
- January 19 — Frederic, Roman Catholic priest, missionary, and bishop (born 1797)
- January 25 — Alexander Roberts Dunn, first Canadian awarded the Victoria Cross (born 18)
- January 28 — Edmund Walker Head, Governor (born 1805)
- February 19 — Dominick Daly, politician (born 1798)
- April 7 — D'Arcy McGee, journalist, politician and Father of Confederation, assassinated (born 1825)
- August 7 — William Agar Adamson, Church of England clergyman and author (born 1800)
- September 12 — Charles Dickson Archibald, lawyer, businessman and politician (born 1802)
- October 17 — Laura Secord, heroine of the War of 1812 (born 1775)
