= 1873 in Canada =

- Decades: 1850s; 1860s; 1870s; 1880s; 1890s
- See also: History of Canada; Timeline of Canadian history; List of years in Canada

Events from the year 1873 in Canada.

== Incumbents ==
=== Crown ===
- Monarch – Victoria

=== Federal government ===
- Governor General – Frederick Hamilton-Temple-Blackwood
- Prime Minister – John A. Macdonald (until November 5) then Alexander Mackenzie (from November 7)
- Parliament – 2nd (from 5 March)

=== Provincial governments ===
==== Lieutenant governors ====
- Lieutenant Governor of British Columbia – Joseph Trutch
- Lieutenant Governor of Manitoba – Alexander Morris
- Lieutenant Governor of New Brunswick – Lemuel Allan Wilmot (until November 15) then Samuel Leonard Tilley
- Lieutenant Governor of Nova Scotia – Charles Hastings Doyle (until May 1) then Joseph Howe (May 1 to July 4) then Adams George Archibald
- Lieutenant Governor of Ontario – William Pearce Howland (until November 11) then John Willoughby Crawford
- Lieutenant Governor of Prince Edward Island – William Cleaver Francis Robinson
- Lieutenant Governor of Quebec – Narcisse-Fortunat Belleau (until February 11) then René-Édouard Caron

==== Premiers ====
- Premier of British Columbia – Amor De Cosmos
- Premier of Manitoba – Henry Joseph Clarke
- Premier of New Brunswick – George Edwin King
- Premier of Nova Scotia – William Annand
- Premier of Ontario – Oliver Mowat
- Premier of Prince Edward Island – James Colledge Pope (until September 1) then Lemuel Cambridge Owen
- Premier of Quebec – Pierre-Joseph-Olivier Chauveau (until February 26) then Gédéon Ouimet

=== Territorial governments ===
==== Lieutenant governors ====
- Lieutenant Governor of the Northwest Territories – Alexander Morris

== Events ==
=== January to June 1873 ===
- February 26 – Gédéon Ouimet becomes Premier of Quebec, replacing Pierre-Joseph-Olivier Chauveau.
- March 12 - Public electric lighting receives its first Canadian demonstration
- April 1
  - 1873 Prince Edward Island general election.
  - James Pope becomes Premier of Prince Edward Island for the second time, replacing Robert Haythorne.
  - The SS Atlantic is wrecked off Peggys Cove.
- April 2 – The Pacific Scandal breaks out.
- May 13 – Sixty are killed in a coal mine explosion in Nova Scotia.
- May 23 – North-West Mounted Police are founded to police the Northwest Territories, which then included the region today of Alberta and Saskatchewan.
- June 1 – The Cypress Hills Massacre occurs.

=== July to December ===
- July 1 – Prince Edward Island joins the Canadian Confederation.
- August 25 – A cyclone hits Cape Breton Island, killing 500 and causing much damage.
- September 1 – L. C. Owen becomes Premier of Prince Edward Island, replacing James Pope.
- September 23 – The Canadian Labour Union is founded.
- November – 1873 Newfoundland general election.
- November 5 – Pacific Scandal: the House of Commons of Canada passes a vote of no confidence in Sir John A. Macdonald's government.
- November 7 – Pacific Scandal: Sir John A. resigns as Prime Minister of Canada, and Alexander Mackenzie is appointed in his place.
- November 8 – Winnipeg incorporated as a city.

== Sport ==
- October 4 – The Argonauts Football Club (Toronto Argonauts) are established

== Smallpox ==
In the opening speech to the 1872-1873 Epidemiological Society conference, Inspector-General Robert Lawson drew attention to the recent prevalence of haemorrhagic forms of smallpox in both the United States and Canada, among other countries. During the smallpox pandemic of 1870-1874, the disease had been carried to America by emigrants, where it had already infected thousands, and killed hundreds in eastern cities such as Boston and New York.

== Births ==
=== January to June ===
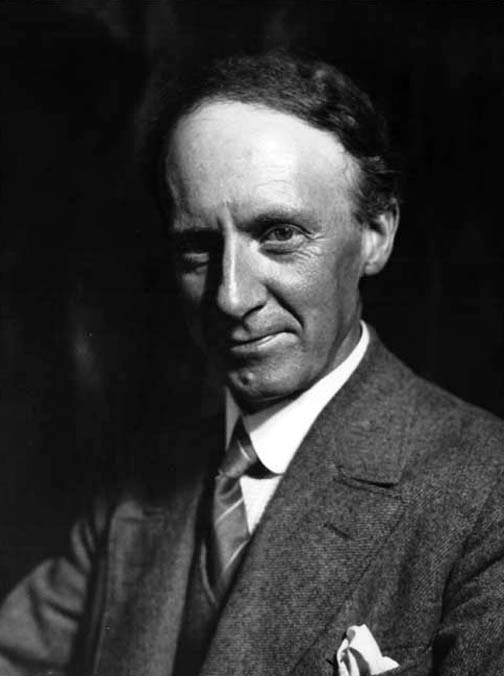
J. E. H. MacDonald

- January 10 – George Orton, middle-distance runner and Olympic gold medallist, first Canadian to win an Olympic medal (d.1958)
- January 19 – Thomas Dufferin Pattullo, politician and 22nd Premier of British Columbia (d.1956)
- February 4 – Étienne Desmarteau, athlete and Olympic gold medallist (d.1905)
- April 9 – Walter Edward Foster, businessman, politician and 16th Premier of New Brunswick (d.1947)
- April 10 – George Black, politician (d.1965)
- May 12 – J. E. H. MacDonald, artist of the Group of Seven (d.1932)
- May 17 – Albert Edward Matthews, 16th Lieutenant Governor of Ontario (d.1949)

=== July to December ===
- August 27 – Maud Allan, actor, dancer and choreographer (d.1956)
- September 20 – Sidney Olcott, film producer, director, actor and screenwriter (d.1949)
- October 20 (or 29) – Nellie McClung, feminist, politician and social activist (d.1951)
- November 21 – Aimé Bénard, politician (d.1938)
- December 8 – John Duncan MacLean, teacher, physician, politician and Premier of British Columbia (d.1948)
- December 9 – George Blewett, academic and philosopher (d.1912)

=== Full date unknown ===
- Margaret C. MacDonald, nurse (d.1948)

== Deaths ==
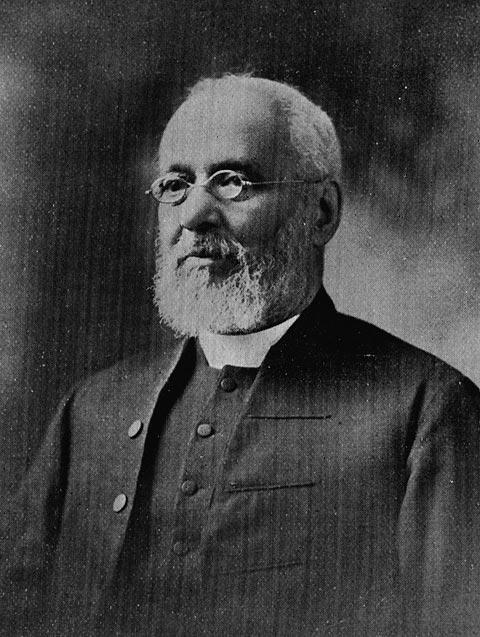
James William Johnston

- May 15 – William James Anderson, physician, amateur geologist and historian (b.1812)
- May 20 – George-Étienne Cartier, politician and statesman (b.1814)
- May 28 – Thomas Brown Anderson, merchant, banker and politician (b.1796)
- June 1 – Joseph Howe, Premier of Nova Scotia (b.1804)
- June 28 – Charles Connell, politician (b.1810)
- November 21 – James William Johnston, lawyer, politician, and judge (b.1792)
- December 9 – William Steeves, politician (b.1814)
