= 1865 in Canada =

- Decades: 1840s; 1850s; 1860s; 1870s; 1880s
- See also: History of Canada; Timeline of Canadian history; List of years in Canada

Events from the year 1865 in Canada.

== Incumbents ==
=== Crown ===
- Monarch – Victoria

=== Federal government ===
- Parliament — 8th

=== Governors ===
- Governor General of the Province of Canada — Charles Monck, 4th Viscount Monck
- Colonial Governor of Newfoundland — Anthony Musgrave
- Governor of New Brunswick — Arthur Charles Hamilton-Gordon
- Governor of Nova Scotia — Charles Hastings Doyle then Richard Graves MacDonnell then Sir William Fenwick Williams
- Governor of Prince Edward Island — George Dundas

=== Premiers ===
- Joint Premiers of the Province of Canada –
  - John Alexander Macdonald, Canada West Premier
  - Étienne-Paschal Taché then Narcisse-Fortunat Belleau, Canada East Premier
- Premier of Newfoundland — Hugh Hoyles then Frederick Carter
- Premiers of New Brunswick — Samuel Leonard Tilley then Albert James Smith
- Premiers of Nova Scotia – Charles Tupper
- Premier of Prince Edward Island – John Hamilton Gray then James Colledge Pope

== Events ==
- February 3 – Legislature approves message to Crown for union of British North America provinces.
- February 20 – The Legislature of the Province of Canada passes a motion in favour of Confederation.
- March 7 – New Brunswick rejects a Confederation scheme.
- March 24 – Macdonald, Brown, Cartier, and Galt appointed to negotiate Confederation in London.
- May 9 – American Civil War ends
- May 10 – An Admiralty letter to the Colonial Office required colonial warships to "wear a Union Jack in the usual place, and the White Ensign, with either the Arms of the Colony, or such other distinguishing mark as may be chosen by the Colony, and approved by the Colonial Office and the Lords Commissioners of the Admiralty". This regulation was mainly directed at Australia and not applicable to Canada, which had no Navy at that time.
- October 20 – Proclamation of Ottawa as seat of government.
- November 7 – 1865 Newfoundland general election
- December 16 – A distinctive Blue Ensign for the province of Canada is authorized by the UK secretary of state for the colonies.
- December 22 – Colonial Office Circular notifying revised Admiralty requirements for flags for colonial warships and for other colonial government vessels and requesting correct drawings of seals or badges to be adopted as distinguishing marks.

== Births ==
- January 7 – Lyman Duff, jurist and Chief Justice of Canada (died 1955)
- February 10 – Richard Gardiner Willis, politician (died 1929)
- February 28 – Wilfred Grenfell, medical missionary (died 1940)
- March 15 – Edith Maude Eaton, author (died 1914)
- April 10 – Jack Miner, conservationist (died 1944)
- May 31 – Clarence Chant, astronomer and physicist (died 1956)
- July 16 – George Bowlby, physician and surgeon, military officer, and mayor of Berlin, Ontario (died 1916)
- August 10 – James Wilson Morrice, painter (died 1924)
- November 2 – Napoleon Lemay, politician (died 1946)
- November 17 – John Stanley Plaskett, astronomer (died 1941)
- December 25 – James Breakey, politician (died 1952)
- December 30 — Emily Julian McManus poet, author, and educator (died 1918)

=== Full date unknown ===
- James Endicott, church leader and missionary (died 1954)

== Deaths ==
- January 16 – Joseph Cunard, merchant, shipbuilder and politician (born 1799)
- July 27 – Augustin-Norbert Morin, lawyer, judge, politician and Joint Premier of the Province of Canada (born 1803)
- July 30 – Étienne-Paschal Taché, doctor, politician, and deputy adjutant-general of the militia (born 1795)
- August 27 – Thomas Chandler Haliburton, author, judge and politician (born 1796)
