= 1867 in Canada =

- Decades: 1840s; 1850s; 1860s; 1870s; 1880s
- See also: History of Canada; Timeline of Canadian history; List of years in Canada

Events from the year 1867 in Canada.

== Incumbents ==
=== Crown ===
- Monarch – Victoria

=== January to June ===
==== Governors ====
- Governor General of Canada – Charles Monck, 4th Viscount Monck
- Lieutenant Governor of New Brunswick – vacant
- Lieutenant Governor of Nova Scotia – Sir William Fenwick Williams

==== Premiers ====
- Premier of Canada – Narcisse-Fortunat Belleau
- Premier of New Brunswick – Peter Mitchell
- Premier of Nova Scotia – Charles Tupper

=== July to December ===
==== Federal government ====
- Governor General – Charles Monck, 4th Viscount Monck
- Prime Minister – John A. Macdonald (from July 1)
- Parliament – 1st (from November 6)

==== Provincial governments ====
===== Lieutenant governors =====
- Lieutenant Governor of New Brunswick – Charles Hastings Doyle (until October 18) then Francis Pym Harding
- Lieutenant Governor of Nova Scotia – Sir William Fenwick Williams (until October 18) then Charles Hastings Doyle
- Lieutenant Governor of Ontario – Henry William Stisted
- Lieutenant Governor of Quebec – Narcisse-Fortunat Belleau

===== Premiers =====
- Premier of New Brunswick – Andrew Rainsford Wetmore (from August 16)
- Premier of Nova Scotia – Hiram Blanchard (July 4 – September 30) then William Annand (from November 4)
- Premier of Ontario – John Sandfield Macdonald (from July 16)
- Premier of Quebec – Pierre-Joseph-Olivier Chauveau (from July 15)

== Events ==
- February 16 – John A. Macdonald marries his second wife Susan Agnes Bernard.
- March 29 – Queen Victoria gives royal assent to the British North America Act, 1867.
- July 1
  - The Province of Canada, Nova Scotia, and New Brunswick are united into the single country of Canada by the British North America Act.
  - Sir John A. Macdonald becomes the first prime minister of Canada.
  - The Windsor Police Service is established.
- July 4 – Hiram Blanchard becomes premier of Nova Scotia, replacing Charles Tupper.
- July 15 – Pierre-Joseph-Olivier Chauveau becomes the first premier of Quebec.
- July 16 – J. S. Macdonald becomes the first premier of Ontario.
- August 7 – September 20 – The 1867 Canadian election sees John A. Macdonald's Conservatives elected as government.
- September 3 – The 1867 Ontario election: J. S. Macdonald Liberal-Conservatives win a minority.
- September 18 – The 1867 Nova Scotia election
- November 6 – The 1st Canadian Parliament meets.
- November 7 – William Annand becomes premier of Nova Scotia, replacing Hiram Blanchard.
- December 7 – The first federal budget is presented by Finance Minister John Rose.

=== Full date unknown ===
- Andrew R. Wetmore becomes premier of New Brunswick, replacing Peter Mitchell.
- The 1867 Quebec election
- The Parliamentary Press Gallery is established.
- Fall: Henry Seth Taylor steam buggy debuts at the Stanstead Fall Fair in Quebec, believed to be Canada's first car.

== Births ==
- January 25 – Simon Fraser Tolmie, politician and 21st Premier of British Columbia (died 1937)
- February 2 – Charles E. Saunders, agronomist (died 1937)
- February 7 – John Livingstone Brown, politician (died 1953)
- February 20 – Flora Denison, feminist
- March 5 – Louis-Alexandre Taschereau, politician and 14th Premier of Quebec (died 1952)
- March 31 – Noah Timmins, mining developer and executive (died 1936)
- June 30 – Napoléon Turcot, politician (died 1939)
- August 9 – Charles Ballantyne, politician (died 1950)
- October 19 – Marie Lacoste Gérin-Lajoie, feminist and social activist (died 1945)
- October 27 – Thomas Walter Scott, Politician and first Premier of Saskatchewan (died 1938)
- November 1 – Newton Rowell, lawyer and politician (died 1941)
- November 22 – Charles Blair Gordon, industrialist and banker, president of the Bank of Montreal (died 1939)
- December 3 – William John Bowser, politician and Premier of British Columbia (died 1933)

== Deaths ==
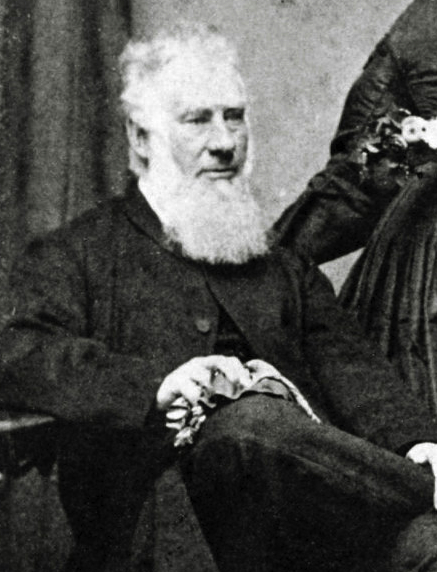
Samuel Harrison

- July 23 – Samuel Harrison, farmer, lawyer, mill owner, politician, judge and 1st Joint Premiers of the Province of Canada (born 1802)
- August 25 – Pierre-Flavien Turgeon, Archbishop of Quebec (born 1787)
- September 7 – Jesse Ketchum, tanner, politician, and philanthropist (born 1782)
- November 1 – John Strachan, first Anglican Bishop of Toronto (born 1778)
- December 10 – Edward Whelan, journalist and politician (born 1824)
