= 1866 in Canada =

- Decades: 1840s; 1850s; 1860s; 1870s; 1880s
- See also: History of Canada; Timeline of Canadian history; List of years in Canada

Events from the year 1866 in Canada.

== Incumbents ==
=== Crown ===
- Monarch – Victoria

=== Federal government ===
- Parliament — 8th

=== Governors ===
- Governor General of the Province of Canada — Charles Monck, 4th Viscount Monck
- Colonial Governor of Newfoundland — Alexander Bannerman
- Governor of New Brunswick — Arthur Charles Hamilton-Gordon
- Governor of Nova Scotia — Sir William Fenwick Williams
- Governor of Prince Edward Island — George Dundas

=== Premiers ===
- Joint Premiers of the Province of Canada –
  - John Alexander Macdonald, Canada West Premier
  - Narcisse-Fortunat Belleau, Canada East Premier
- Premier of Newfoundland — Frederick Carter
- Premiers of New Brunswick — Albert James Smith then Peter Mitchell
- Premiers of Nova Scotia – Charles Tupper
- Premier of Prince Edward Island – James Colledge Pope

== Events ==
- May–June – The 1866 New Brunswick election
- June 2 – Battle of Ridgeway: Fenians invade Canada.
- June 9 – At Danville, Canada East, a fire breaks out in a railway car containing 2,000 pounds (910 kg) of ammunition. Private Timothy O'Hea, an Irish soldier, will be awarded the Victoria Cross for his leadership and initiative in fighting the fire.
- August 6 – The colonies of Vancouver Island and British Columbia are united, bearing the Mainland's name as the Colony of British Columbia, with the Island capital, Victoria, as the seat of government of the united colony.
- December 4 – The London Conference on resolutions discussed in 1864, to be added to the British North America Act.
- The piano manufacturer Heintzman & Co. is incorporated.
- Peter Edmund Jones graduates from Queen's University, becoming Canada's first indigenous medical doctor

== Births ==
=== January to June ===
- February 24 – Martha Black, politician and the second woman elected to the House of Commons of Canada (died 1957)
- February 26 – Herbert Henry Dow, chemical industrialist (died 1930)
- March 2 – Margaret Sibella Brown, bryologist (died 1961)
- March 8 – John Wesley Dafoe, journalist and author (died 1944)
- May 10 – Constance Piers, journalist, poet and editor (died 1939)
- May 11 – Edward Rogers Wood, financier (died 1941)
- May 12 – Walter Charles Murray, first President of the University of Saskatchewan (died 1945)
- June 14 – Henry Sproatt, architect (died 1934)

=== July to December ===
- September 1 – Clifford William Robinson, lawyer, businessman, politician and 11th Premier of New Brunswick (died 1944)
- September 12 – Freeman Freeman-Thomas, 1st Marquess of Willingdon, 13th Governor General of Canada (died 1941)
- October 6 – Reginald Fessenden, inventor and radio pioneer (died 1932)
- October 19 – Clarence Lucas, composer, lyricist, conductor and music professor (died 1947)
- December 26 – Godfroy Langlois, politician, journalist and lawyer (died 1928)

== Deaths ==
- January 16 – David Willson, religious leader and mystic (born 1778)
- January 28 – Robert Foulis, inventor, civil engineer and artist (born 1796)
- February 3 – François-Xavier Garneau, notary, civil servant, poet and historian (born 1809)
- February 19 – Charles Richard Ogden, Joint Premier of the Province of Canada (born 1791)
- March 14 – Norman McLeod, Presbyterian minister (born 1780)
- April 11 – Edward Bowen, lawyer, judge and politician (born 1780)
- July 28 – Frédéric-Auguste Quesnel, politician, lawyer, and businessman (born 1785)
- October 26 – John Kinder Labatt, brewer and founder of the Labatt Brewing Company (born 1803)
- November 1 – Jean-Baptiste-Éric Dorion, journalist and politician (born 1826)
