= 1863 in Canada =

- Decades: 1840s; 1850s; 1860s; 1870s; 1880s
- See also: History of Canada; Timeline of Canadian history; List of years in Canada

Events from the year 1863 in Canada.

== Incumbents ==
- Monarch — Victoria

=== Federal government ===
- Parliament — 7th then 8th

=== Governors ===
- Governor General of the Province of Canada — Charles Monck, 4th Viscount Monck
- Colonial Governor of Newfoundland — Alexander Bannerman
- Governor of New Brunswick — Arthur Hamilton-Gordon, 1st Baron Stanmore
- Governor of Nova Scotia — George Phipps, 2nd Marquess of Normanby
- Governor of Prince Edward Island — George Dundas

=== Premiers ===
- Joint Premiers of the Province of Canada –
  - John Sandfield Macdonald, Canada West Premier
  - Louis-Victor Sicotte, Canada East Premier until May 15, 1863
  - Antoine-Aimé Dorion, Canada East Premier on May 15, 1863
- Premier of Newfoundland — Hugh Hoyles
- Premiers of New Brunswick — Samuel Leonard Tilley
- Premiers of Nova Scotia –
  - Joseph Howe (until June 5, 1863)
  - James William Johnston (on June 11, 1863)
- Premier of Prince Edward Island –
  - Edward Palmer (before March 2, 1863)
  - John Hamilton Gray (on March 2, 1863)

== Parliaments and Assemblies ==
- 7th Parliament of the Province of Canada
- 8th Parliament of the Province of Canada
- 19th New Brunswick Legislative Assembly
- 22nd General Assembly of Nova Scotia
- 21st General Assembly of Prince Edward Island
- 22nd General Assembly of Prince Edward Island

== Events ==
- March 17 — U.S. gives notice of intent to abrogate reciprocity.
- September 5 — Louis-Victor Sicotte appointed a puisne judge of the Superior Court for Saint-Hyacinthe District
- December 7 — New Brunswick and Nova Scotia: the Chesapeake Affair.
- Militia Pay Act for all males 18–60.

== Births ==
- February 3 — James White, geographer
- May 19 — John Alexander Mathieson, jurist, politician and Premier of Prince Edward Island (died 1947)
- July 1 — William Grant Stairs, explorer, soldier and adventurer (died 1892)
- October 4 — Peter Veniot, businessman, newspaper owner, politician and 17th Premier of New Brunswick (died 1936)
- October 10 — Louis Cyr, strongman (died 1912)
- November 14 — Edward Foster, fingerprint expert

== Deaths ==
- January 17 — Peter Warren Dease, HBC officer and Arctic explorer (born 1788)
- January 31 — Sir John Robinson, 1st Baronet, of Toronto, lawyer, judge and political figure (born 1791)
- November 20 — James Bruce, 8th Earl of Elgin, Governor General (born 1811)
- December 10 — James FitzGibbon, British colonel who served in Canada for 45 years (born 1780)
