= 1878 in Canada =

- Decades: 1850s; 1860s; 1870s; 1880s; 1890s
- See also: History of Canada; Timeline of Canadian history; List of years in Canada

Events from the year 1878 in Canada.

== Incumbents ==
=== Crown ===
- Monarch – Victoria

=== Federal government ===
- Governor General – Frederick Hamilton-Temple-Blackwood (until November 25) then John Campbell, Marquess of Lorne
- Prime Minister – Alexander Mackenzie (until October 8) then John A. Macdonald (from October 17)
- Chief Justice – William Buell Richards (Ontario)
- Parliament – 3rd (until 17 August)

=== Provincial governments ===
==== Lieutenant governors ====
- Lieutenant Governor of British Columbia – Albert Norton Richards
- Lieutenant Governor of Manitoba – Joseph-Édouard Cauchon
- Lieutenant Governor of New Brunswick – Samuel Leonard Tilley (until July 11) then Edward Barron Chandler
- Lieutenant Governor of the North-West Territories – David Laird
- Lieutenant Governor of Nova Scotia – Adams George Archibald
- Lieutenant Governor of Ontario – Donald Alexander Macdonald
- Lieutenant Governor of Prince Edward Island – Robert Hodgson
- Lieutenant Governor of Quebec – Luc Letellier de St-Just

==== Premiers ====
- Premier of British Columbia – Andrew Charles Elliott (until June 25) then George Anthony Walkem
- Premier of Manitoba – Robert Atkinson Davis (until October 16) then John Norquay
- Premier of New Brunswick – George Edwin King (until May 3) then John James Fraser
- Premier of Nova Scotia – Philip Carteret Hill (until October 15) then Simon Hugh Holmes (from October 22)
- Premier of Ontario – Oliver Mowat
- Premier of Prince Edward Island – Louis Henry Davies
- Premier of Quebec – Charles Boucher de Boucherville (until March 8) then Henri-Gustave Joly de Lotbinière

=== Territorial governments ===
==== Lieutenant governors ====
- Lieutenant Governor of Keewatin – Joseph-Édouard Cauchon
- Lieutenant Governor of the North-West Territories – David Laird

== Events ==
- March 7 – Both the Université de Montréal and the University of Western Ontario are incorporated.
- March 8 – Henri-Gustave Joly de Lotbinière becomes premier of Quebec, replacing Sir Charles-Eugène de Boucherville.
- May 1 – In the Quebec election, Joseph-Adolphe Chapleau's Conservatives win a minority.
- June – The New Brunswick election.
- June 25 – George Walkem becomes premier of British Columbia for the second time, replacing Andrew Elliott.
- July 20 – The British Columbia election.
- September 17
  - In the federal election, Sir John A. Macdonald's Conservatives win a majority, defeating Alexander Mackenzie's Liberals.
  - In the Nova Scotia election, Simon Hugh Holmes's Conservatives win a majority, defeating Philip Carteret Hill's Liberals.
- October 16 – John Norquay becomes premier of Manitoba, replacing Robert A. Davis.
- October 17 – Sir John A. Macdonald becomes prime minister for the second time, replacing Alexander Mackenzie.
- October 22 – Simon Holmes becomes premier of Nova Scotia, replacing Philip Hill.
- December 18 – The Manitoba election.

=== Full date unknown ===
- Anti-Chinese sentiment in British Columbia reaches a high point as the government bans Chinese workers from public works.
- John James Fraser becomes premier of New Brunswick, replacing George King.
- The Newfoundland election.

== Births ==
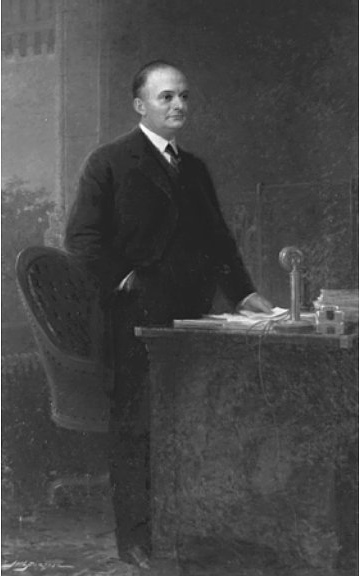
Ernest Charles Drury

=== January to June ===
- January 11 – Percy Chapman Black, politician (d.1961)
- January 13 – Lionel Groulx, priest, historian, Quebec nationalist and traditionalist (d.1967)
- January 22 – Ernest Charles Drury, politician, writer and 8th Premier of Ontario (d.1968)
- February 27 – William Herbert Burns, politician (d.1964)
- February 28 – Arthur Roebuck, politician and labour lawyer (d.1971)
- April 14 – John Walter Jones, politician and Premier of Prince Edward Island (d.1954)
- April 29 – Fawcett Taylor, politician (d.1940)
- June 14 – Lewis Stubbs, judge and politician (d.1958)
- June 20 – Seymour Farmer, politician (d.1951)

=== July to December ===
- July 14 – Ernest Frederick Armstrong, politician (d.1948)
- July 23 – James Thomas Milton Anderson, politician and 5th Premier of Saskatchewan (d.1946)
- August 15 – Thomas Laird Kennedy, politician and 15th Premier of Ontario (d.1959)
- September 18 – William Sherring, marathon runner and Olympic gold medalist (d.1964)
- December 8 – Henry Herbert Stevens, politician and businessman (d.1973)
- December 30 – William Aberhart, politician and 8th Premier of Alberta (d.1943)

== Deaths ==
- February 23 – William Workman, businessman and municipal politician (b.1807)
- April 3 – Louis-Philippe Turcotte, historian (b.1842)
- April 12 – John Young, politician (b.1811)
- May 13 – George Moffat, Sr., businessman and politician (b.1810)
- May 20 – Lemuel Allan Wilmot, lawyer, politician, judge, and 3rd Lieutenant Governor of New Brunswick (b.1809)
- November 3 – Pierre Bachand, politician (b.1835)
- November 28 – Francis Evans Cornish, politician (b.1831)
- December 6 – Jean-Baptiste Meilleur, doctor, educator and politician (b.1796)
