= 1876 in Canada =

- Decades: 1850s; 1860s; 1870s; 1880s; 1890s
- See also: History of Canada; Timeline of Canadian history; List of years in Canada

Events from the year 1876 in Canada.

== Incumbents ==
=== Crown ===
- Monarch – Victoria

=== Federal government ===
- Governor General – Frederick Hamilton-Temple-Blackwood
- Prime Minister – Alexander Mackenzie
- Chief Justice – William Buell Richards (Ontario)
- Parliament – 3rd

=== Provincial governments ===
==== Lieutenant governors ====
- Lieutenant Governor of British Columbia – Joseph Trutch (until June 27) then Albert Norton Richards
- Lieutenant Governor of Manitoba – Alexander Morris
- Lieutenant Governor of New Brunswick – Samuel Leonard Tilley
- Lieutenant Governor of the North-West Territories – David Laird (from October 7)
- Lieutenant Governor of Nova Scotia – Adams George Archibald
- Lieutenant Governor of Ontario – Donald Alexander Macdonald
- Lieutenant Governor of Prince Edward Island – Robert Hodgson
- Lieutenant Governor of Quebec – René-Édouard Caron (until December 13) then Luc Letellier de St-Just (from December 15)

==== Premiers ====
- Premier of British Columbia – George Anthony Walkem (until February 1) then Andrew Charles Elliott
- Premier of Manitoba – Robert Atkinson Davis
- Premier of New Brunswick – George Edwin King
- Premier of Nova Scotia – Philip Carteret Hill
- Premier of Ontario – Oliver Mowat
- Premier of Prince Edward Island – Lemuel Cambridge Owen (until August 1) then Louis Henry Davies
- Premier of Quebec – Charles Boucher de Boucherville

=== Territorial governments ===
==== Lieutenant governors ====
- Lieutenant Governor of Keewatin – Alexander Morris (from October 7)
- Lieutenant Governor of the Northwest Territories – Alexander Morris then David Laird

== Events ==
- January 1 – The building of Fredericton City Hall is completed
- February 1 – Andrew Elliott becomes premier of British Columbia, replacing George Walkem
- April 12 - The Indian Act is passed. Consolidating and expanding on existing Canadian laws, it defines the special status and land regulations of Aboriginal peoples in Canada who live on reserves; status Indians have no vote in Canadian elections and are exempt from taxes
- July 1 – The Intercolonial Railway connecting central Canada to the Maritimes is completed
- August – Sir Louis Henry Davies becomes Premier of Prince Edward Island, replacing Lemuel Cambridge Owen
- August 10 – The world's first long-distance phone call connects the Bell residence with a shoe and boot store in nearby Paris, Ontario.
- August 23 – The first signings of Treaty 6. Further signings will be on August 28 and September 9.
- October 7 – The District of Keewatin (incorporating the disputed area between Ontario and Manitoba) is separated from the North-West Territories.
- October 10 – 1876 Prince Edward Island election: Lemuel Cambridge Owen's Conservatives win a second consecutive majority

=== Full date unknown ===
- The Toronto Women's Literary Club is founded as a front for the suffrage movement.
- The Legislative Council of Manitoba is abolished, and the legislature becomes unicameral.

== Sport ==
- September 20 – The Ottawa Football Club (Ottawa Rough Riders) is established.

== Births ==
=== January to June ===
- January 8 – Matthew Robert Blake, politician (died 1937)
- January 21 – James Charles Brady, politician (died 1962)
- January 27 – Frank S. Cahill, politician (died 1934)
- April 3 – Margaret Anglin, actress, director and producer (died 1958)
- April 21 – William Henry Wright, prospector and newspaper owner (died 1951)
- June 17 – Thomas Crerar, politician and Minister (died 1975)

=== July to December ===
- August 23 – William Melville Martin, politician and Premier of Saskatchewan (died 1970)
- September 6 – John Macleod, physician, physiologist and Nobel laureate (died 1935)
- October 6 – Ernest Lapointe, politician (died 1941)
- November 18 – Walter Seymour Allward, sculptor (died 1955)
- December 9 – Berton Churchill, actor (died 1940)

== Deaths ==
- February 4 – Charles-Séraphin Rodier, mayor of Montreal (born 1797)
- February 5 – George Ryan, politician (born 1806)
- April 5 – Élisabeth Bruyère, nun (born 1818)
- June 1 – Malcolm Cameron, businessman and politician (born 1808)
- July 3 – Aldis Bernard, mayor of Montreal (born 1810)
- July 27 – Thomas-Louis Connolly, Archbishop of Halifax (born 1814)
- October 2 – Louis-Ovide Brunet, priest and botanist (born 1826)
- October 6 – John Young, 1st Baron Lisgar, Governor General (born 1807)
- December 13 – René-Édouard Caron, 2 Mayor of Quebec City and 2nd Lieutenant-Governor of Quebec (born 1800)

=== Full date unknown ===
- Edward Feild, Church of England clergyman, inspector of schools, bishop of Newfoundland (born 1801)
- Wilson Ruffin Abbott, businessman and landowner (born 1801)

== Historical documents ==
Bell's Ontario experiments lead to the first long-distance telephone conversation

Treaty 6 annexes land of Cree and other nations in exchange for reserves subject to sale or development, plus money and supplies

Matron reports illness and death of girl at Wawanosh Indian residential school as local physician says her disorder is hysteria

Mark Twain's anger at a Canadian firm publishing The Adventures of Tom Sawyer without permission

Emigrant's guide written especially for "people of small fortune"
