= 1938 in Canada =

- Decades: 1910s; 1920s; 1930s; 1940s; 1950s
- See also: History of Canada; Timeline of Canadian history; List of years in Canada

Events from the year 1938 in Canada.

== Incumbents ==
=== Crown ===
- Monarch – George VI

=== Federal government ===
- Governor General – John Buchan
- Prime Minister – William Lyon Mackenzie King
- Chief Justice – Lyman Poore Duff (British Columbia)
- Parliament – 18th

=== Provincial governments ===
==== Lieutenant governors ====
- Lieutenant Governor of Alberta – John C. Bowen
- Lieutenant Governor of British Columbia – Eric Hamber
- Lieutenant Governor of Manitoba – William Johnston Tupper
- Lieutenant Governor of New Brunswick – Murray MacLaren
- Lieutenant Governor of Nova Scotia – Robert Irwin
- Lieutenant Governor of Ontario – Albert Edward Matthews
- Lieutenant Governor of Prince Edward Island – George Des Brisay de Blois
- Lieutenant Governor of Quebec – Esioff-Léon Patenaude
- Lieutenant Governor of Saskatchewan – Archibald Peter McNab

==== Premiers ====
- Premier of Alberta – William Aberhart
- Premier of British Columbia – Thomas Dufferin Pattullo
- Premier of Manitoba – John Bracken
- Premier of New Brunswick – Allison Dysart
- Premier of Nova Scotia – Angus Lewis Macdonald
- Premier of Ontario – Mitchell Hepburn
- Premier of Prince Edward Island – Thane Campbell
- Premier of Quebec – Maurice Duplessis
- Premier of Saskatchewan – William John Patterson

=== Territorial governments ===
==== Commissioners ====
- Controller of Yukon – George A. Jeckell
- Commissioner of Northwest Territories – Charles Camsell

== Events ==
- June 8 - Saskatchewan general election: William John Patterson's Liberals win a second consecutive majority

=== Full date unknown ===
- Superman first appears in Action #1 (cover date June 1938), as a backup feature. The character is created by Joe Shuster (an artist for the Toronto Star) and American writer Jerry Siegel for National Comics.
- Vaccination for tuberculosis (the leading cause of death in young people) is introduced.

== Sport ==
- April 12 - The Chicago Black Hawks win their second Stanley Cup by defeating the Toronto Maple Leafs 3 games to 1.
- April 18 - The Manitoba Junior Hockey League's St. Boniface Seals win their only Memorial Cup by defeating the Ontario Hockey Association's Oshawa Generals 3 games to 2. The deciding Game 5 was played Maple Leaf Gardens in Toronto
- December 10 - In a repeat of the 25th Grey Cup, the Toronto Argonauts win their fifth Grey Cup by defeating the Winnipeg Blue Bombers 30 to 7 in the 26th Grey Cup played at Varsity Stadium in Toronto

== Births ==
=== January to June ===
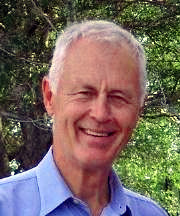
John Hamm

- January 9 - Claudette Boyer, politician, member of the Legislative Assembly of Ontario for Ottawa—Vanier (1999–2003) (d.2013)
- January 10 - Frank Mahovlich, ice hockey player and Senator
- January 13 - William B. Davis, actor
- January 16 - Lou Angotti, ice hockey player and coach (d. 2021)
- February 9 - Jovette Marchessault, writer and artist (d. 2012)
- February 17 - Martha Henry, actress
- February 22 - Pierre Vallières, journalist and writer (d. 1998)
- April 5 - David Helwig, poet, novelist, and essayist (d. 2018)
- April 8 - John Hamm, physician, politician and 32nd Premier of Nova Scotia
- April 12 - Roger Caron, author
- May 13 - Lucille Starr, singer, songwriter and yodeler
- May 16 - Jim Coutts, political advisor (d.2013)
- May 24 - Tommy Chong, comedian, actor and musician
- May 26 - Teresa Stratas, operatic soprano
- May 30 - Eugene Belliveau, Canadian football defensive lineman
- June 4 - John Harvard, journalist, politician and 23rd Lieutenant Governor of Manitoba
- June 13 - John Newlove, poet (d.2013)
- June 19
  - Jean-Claude Labrecque, director and cinematographer
  - Beth Phinney, educator and politician
- June 26 - Ken Monteith, politician

=== July to September ===
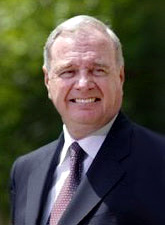
Paul Martin

- July 12 - Matt Ravlich, ice hockey defenceman
- July 14 - Moshe Safdie, architect and urban designer
- July 18 - Helen Gardiner, philanthropist and co-founder of the Gardiner Museum (d.2008)
- July 29
  - Peter Jennings, journalist and television news anchor (d.2005)
  - Jean Rochon, politician (d. 2021)
- August 1 - Noble Villeneuve, politician (d. 2018)
- August 8 - Jacques Hétu, composer (d. 2010)
- August 9 - Micheline Coulombe Saint-Marcoux, musician and composer (d.1985)
- August 25 - Colin Thatcher, politician and murderer
- August 28 - Paul Martin, politician and 21st Prime Minister of Canada

=== October to December ===
- October 8 - Walter Gretzky, ice hockey player and coach (d.2021)
- October 14 - Ron Lancaster, Canadian football player and coach (d.2008)
- October 27 - Tim Ralfe, journalist (d.2000)
- October 28 - Gary Cowan, golfer
- November 3 - Yvon Cormier, wrestler (d.2009)
- November 4 - LeRoy Fjordbotten, politician (d. 2017)
- November 13 - Gérald Godin, poet and politician (d.1994)
- November 15 - Denis DeJordy, ice hockey player and coach
- November 17 - Gordon Lightfoot, singer and songwriter (d. 2023)
- November 18 – Annon Lee Silver, lyric soprano (d.1971)
- November 26 - Rich Little, impressionist and voice actor
- December 16 - John Allan Cameron, folk singer (d.2006)
- December 22 - Lucien Bouchard, lawyer, diplomat, politician and Minister

=== Undated ===
- Roland Doré, educator, President of the Canadian Space Agency

== Deaths ==
- January 4 - George Halsey Perley, politician and diplomat (b.1857)
- January 8 - Aimé Bénard, politician (b.1873)
- January 28 - Hugh Graham, 1st Baron Atholstan, newspaper publisher (b.1848)
- February 20 - William Alves Boys, politician and barrister (b.1868)
- March 23 - Thomas Walter Scott, politician and first Premier of Saskatchewan (b.1867)
- April 13 - Grey Owl, writer and conservationist (b.1888)
- April 24 - John Wycliffe Lowes Forster, artist (b.1850)
- May 6 - Victor Cavendish, 9th Duke of Devonshire, politician and 11th Governor General of Canada (b.1868)
- May 7 - Frederick Cronyn Betts, politician (b.1896)
- July 25 - Francis Haszard, jurist, politician and Premier of Prince Edward Island (b.1849)
- December 26 - Pierre-Ernest Boivin, politician and businessman (b.1872)

== See also ==
- List of Canadian films
