= Ingraham Ebenezer Bill =

Canadian writer and journalist

Ingraham Ebenezer Bill (19 February 1805 – 4 August 1891) was a Canadian author, journalist, and minister from Billtown, Nova Scotia.

Bill was orphaned at an early age, and found his guidance from an older brother and his minister, Edward Manning. He grew up with strong ties to public duty and the Baptist church.

Bill was important to maritime history because of his role in the development of their Baptist Churches and the documentation of the history surrounding this growth.
