= 1870 in Canada =

- Decades: 1850s; 1860s; 1870s; 1880s; 1890s
- See also: History of Canada; Timeline of Canadian history; List of years in Canada

Events from the year 1870 in Canada.

== Incumbents ==
=== Crown ===
- Monarch – Victoria

=== Federal government ===
- Governor General – John Young, 1st Baron Lisgar
- Prime Minister – John A. Macdonald
- Parliament – 1st

=== Provincial governments ===
==== Lieutenant governors ====
- Lieutenant Governor of Manitoba – Adams George Archibald (from May 20)
- Lieutenant Governor of New Brunswick – Lemuel Allan Wilmot
- Lieutenant Governor of Nova Scotia – Charles Hastings Doyle
- Lieutenant Governor of Ontario – William Pearce Howland
- Lieutenant Governor of Quebec – Narcisse-Fortunat Belleau

==== Premiers ====
- Premier of Manitoba – Alfred Boyd (from September 16)
- Premier of New Brunswick – Andrew Rainsford Wetmore (until June 9) then George Edwin King
- Premier of Nova Scotia – William Annand
- Premier of Ontario – John Sandfield Macdonald
- Premier of Quebec – Pierre-Joseph-Olivier Chauveau

=== Territorial governments ===
==== Lieutenant governors ====
- Lieutenant Governor of the Northwest Territories – William McDougall (until May 10) then Adams George Archibald

== Events ==
- March 4 – Thomas Scott is executed by Riel's provisional government in the Red River Colony.
- May 12 – The Canadian Parliament's Manitoba Act receives royal assent. The act provides for the establishment of the province Manitoba when Rupert's Land is transferred to Canada.
- May 25 – Battle of Eccles Hill: Canadian Militia defeat Fenian raiders.
- May 27 – Battle of Trout River: British regulars and Canadian militia defeat Fenian raiders.
- June–July – The 1870 New Brunswick election
- July 15 – The British Privy Council's Rupert's Land and North-Western Territory Order transfers those territories to Canada, and Manitoba and the North-West Territories are established.
- August 24 – The Wolseley expedition arrives at Upper Fort Garry, Manitoba
- September 16 – Alfred Boyd becomes the first premier of Manitoba.
- October – Battle of the Belly River: the Blackfoot Confederacy decisively defeats the Iron Confederacy.
- December 27 – The 1870 Manitoba election

== Births ==
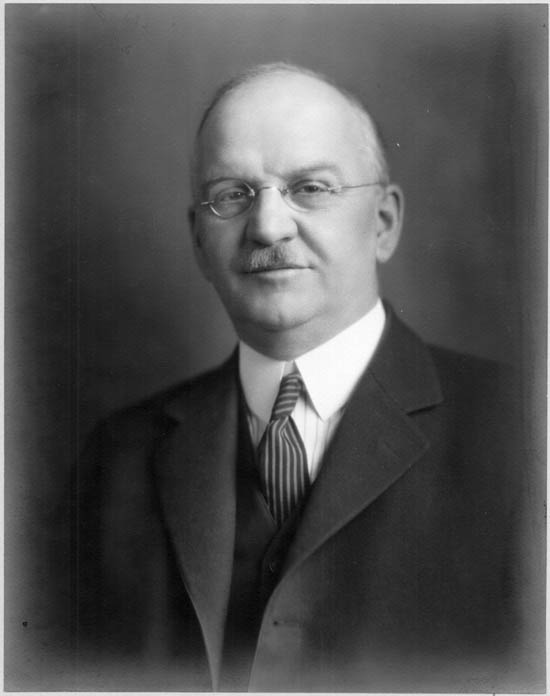
Howard Ferguson

- May 14 – Richard Langton Baker, politician (d.1951)
- May 21 – Leonard Percy de Wolfe Tilley, lawyer, politician and 20th Premier of New Brunswick (d.1947)
- June 18 – Howard Ferguson, politician and 9th Premier of Ontario (d.1946)

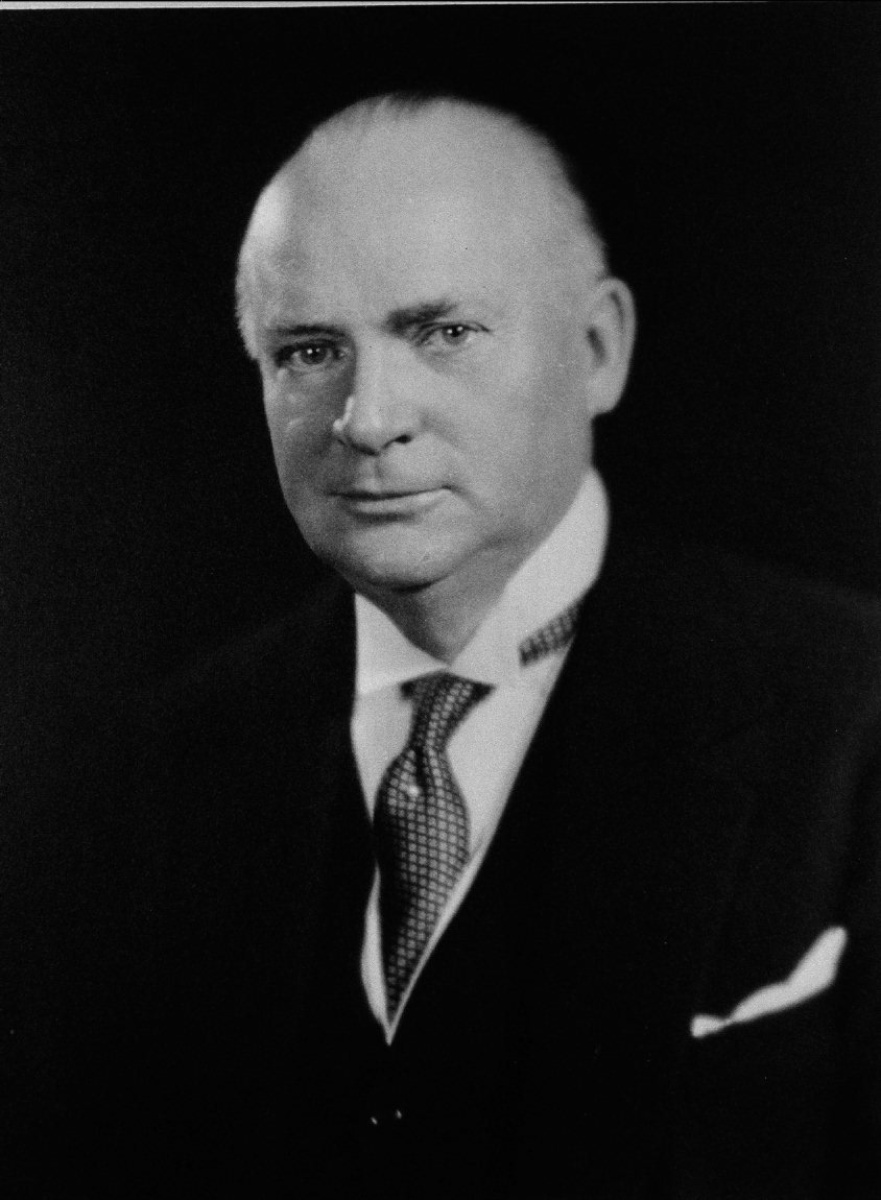
R. B. Bennett

- July 3 – R. B. Bennett, lawyer, businessman, politician, philanthropist and 11th Prime Minister of Canada (d.1947)
- July 28 – Aubin-Edmond Arsenault, politician and Premier of Prince Edward Island (d.1968)
- July 29 – George Dixon, boxer, first black world boxing champion in any weight class and first Canadian-born boxing champion (d.1909)
- September 7 – James Tompkins, priest and educator (d.1953)
- October 16 – Wallace Rupert Turnbull, engineer and inventor (d.1954)
- November 10 – Harlan Carey Brewster, politician and Premier of British Columbia (d.1918)
- November 17 – Jean Prévost, politician (d. 1915)
- December 15 – Richard McBride, politician and Premier of British Columbia (d.1917)

=== Full date unknown ===
- Thomas Langton Church, politician and Mayor of Toronto (d.1950)

== Deaths ==
- February 6 – William MacBean George Colebrooke, lieutenant governor of New Brunswick (b.1787)
- March 4 – Thomas Scott, Orangemen (b.1842)
- March 31 – Thomas Cooke, missionary, and the first Bishop of Trois Rivières (b.1792)
- August 7 – François Lesieur Desaulniers, farmer and political figure (b.1785)
- October 13 – Charles-François Baillargeon, Archbishops of Quebec (b.1798)
- October 25 – Etienne-Michel Faillon, Catholic historian (b.1800)
- December 23 – Théophile Hamel, painter (b.1817)
