= 1937 in Canada =

- Decades: 1910s; 1920s; 1930s; 1940s; 1950s
- See also: History of Canada; Timeline of Canadian history; List of years in Canada

Events from the year 1937 in Canada.

== Incumbents ==
=== Crown ===
- Monarch – George VI

=== Federal government ===
- Governor General – John Buchan
- Prime Minister – William Lyon Mackenzie King
- Chief Justice – Lyman Poore Duff (British Columbia)
- Parliament – 18th

=== Provincial governments ===
==== Lieutenant governors ====
- Lieutenant Governor of Alberta – Philip Primrose (until March 17) then John C. Bowen (from March 23)
- Lieutenant Governor of British Columbia – Eric Hamber
- Lieutenant Governor of Manitoba – William Johnston Tupper
- Lieutenant Governor of New Brunswick – Murray MacLaren
- Lieutenant Governor of Nova Scotia – Walter Harold Covert (until April 7) then Robert Irwin
- Lieutenant Governor of Ontario – Herbert Alexander Bruce (until November 23) then Albert Edward Matthews
- Lieutenant Governor of Prince Edward Island – George Des Brisay de Blois
- Lieutenant Governor of Quebec – Esioff-Léon Patenaude
- Lieutenant Governor of Saskatchewan – Archibald Peter McNab

==== Premiers ====
- Premier of Alberta – William Aberhart
- Premier of British Columbia – Thomas Dufferin Pattullo
- Premier of Manitoba – John Bracken
- Premier of New Brunswick – Allison Dysart
- Premier of Nova Scotia – Angus Lewis Macdonald
- Premier of Ontario – Mitchell Hepburn
- Premier of Prince Edward Island – Thane Campbell
- Premier of Quebec – Maurice Duplessis
- Premier of Saskatchewan – William John Patterson

=== Territorial governments ===
==== Commissioners ====
- Controller of Yukon – George A. Jeckell
- Commissioner of Northwest Territories – Charles Camsell

== Events ==
- April – A Crucifix was hung in the Montreal city council at the initiative of Joseph-Émile Dubreuil. The crucifix would hung there until 2019.
- April 10 – Trans-Canada Airlines, the predecessor of Air Canada, was created as a subsidiary of Canadian National Railway
- July 5 – Midale and Yellow Grass, Saskatchewan, record the highest temperature ever in Canada, with a record high of 45 °C (113 °F).
- August 15 – The Rowell-Sirois Commission is formed
- September 1 – Regular flights of Trans-Canada Air Lines begin
- October 6 – Ontario election: Mitchell Hepburn's Liberals win a second consecutive majority
- November 24 – The first Governor General's Awards are given.
- First ascent of Mount Lucania (5,226 m), third highest mountain in Canada.

== Sport ==
- January 28 – Howie Morenz of the Montreal Canadiens suffers a career-ending leg injury in a game against the Chicago Black Hawks
- March 8 – While hospitalized for his leg injury, Morenz dies of a coronary embolism.
- March 11 – Morenz's funeral at the Montreal Forum. 50,000 mourners queue to pay respect.
- April 17 – The Manitoba Junior Hockey League's Winnipeg Monarchs win their second Memorial Cup by defeating the Northern Ontario Hockey Association's Copper Cliff Redmen 3 games to 1. The deciding Game 4 was played at Maple Leaf Gardens in Toronto
- December 11 – Toronto Argonauts win their fourth Grey Cup by defeating the Winnipeg Blue Bombers 4 to 3 in the 25th Grey Cup played at Varsity Stadium in Toronto

== Births ==
=== January to June ===
- January 5 – Richard Cashin, lawyer, politician and trade union leader
- January 21 – Jim Unger, cartoonist (d. 2012)
- January 24 – Suzanne Tremblay, politician
- January 26 – Maureen Hemphill, politician
- January 29 – Frank Iacobucci, jurist and Puisne Justice on the Supreme Court of Canada
- January 31 – Andrée Boucher, politician and 39th Mayor of Quebec City (d. 2007)
- February 5 – Larry Hillman, ice hockey player and coach (d. 2022)
- February 10 – Roy Megarry, publisher
- February 26 – Hagood Hardy, composer, pianist and vibraphonist (d. 1997)
- March 2 – Joseph B. MacInnis, diver
- March 9
  - Bernard Landry, lawyer, teacher, politician and 28th Premier of Quebec
  - Harry Neale, ice hockey coach and broadcaster
- March 10 – Tommy Hunter, country music singer
- March 16 – Brian Browne, jazz pianist and composer (d. 2018)
- March 26 – James Lee, politician and 28th Premier of Prince Edward Island
- March 30 – Maria Rika Maniates, musicologist (d. 2011)
- April 13 – Stan Stasiak, pro wrestler
- April 29 – Jean Gauthier, ice hockey player (Montreal Canadiens, Philadelphia Flyers, Boston Bruins) (d. 2013)
- May 9 – Jim Walding, politician (d. 2007)
- May 13 – Roch Carrier, novelist
- May 23 – Jacqueline Lemay, Canadian singer-songwriter and guitarist (d. 2026)
- June 15 – Toby Tarnow, actress

=== July to December ===
- July 12 – Michel Louvain, singer (d. 2021)
- July 30 – John de Chastelain, general, diplomat and Chairman of the Independent International Commission on Decommissioning (in Northern Ireland)
- August 2 – Garth Hudson, musician (d. 2025)
- August 16 – David Anderson, politician and Minister
- August 16 – Ian Deans, politician (d. 2016)
- August 25 – John G. Bryden, lawyer, public servant, businessman and Senator
- September 2 – Len Carlson, voice actor (d. 2006)
- September 3 – Gerry Brisson, ice hockey player (d. 2013)
- September 5 – John Dahmer, politician (d. 1988)
- September 8 – Barbara Frum, radio and television journalist (d. 1992)
- September 9 – Jean Augustine, politician
- September 12 – George Chuvalo, boxer
- September 19 – Neil Gaudry, politician (d. 1999)
- September 23 – Jacques Poulin, novelist (d. 2025)
- September 27 – Guido Basso, jazz musician (d. 2023)
- October 19 – Marilyn Bell, long-distance swimmer, first person to swim across Lake Ontario
- October 19 – Stanley Faulder, murderer and first Canadian citizen to be executed in the United States since 1952 (d. 1999)
- October 22 – Aiko Suzuki, textile and visual artist (d. 2005).
- November 4 – Michael Wilson, politician and diplomat (d. 2019)
- November 6 – Gerry St. Germain, politician
- November 11 – Stephen Lewis, politician, broadcaster and diplomat (d. 2026)
- November 12
  - Barbara McDougall, politician, Minister of Foreign Affairs
  - Glen Shortliffe, Clerk of the Privy Council (d. 2010)
- December 4 – Donnelly Rhodes, actor (d. 2018)
- December 13 – Ron Taylor, baseball player (d. 2025)
- December 19 – Wayne Maunder, Canadian-born American actor (d. 2018)

=== Date unknown ===
- Élise Paré-Tousignant, music administrator and pedagogue (d. 2018)

== Deaths ==
=== January to June ===
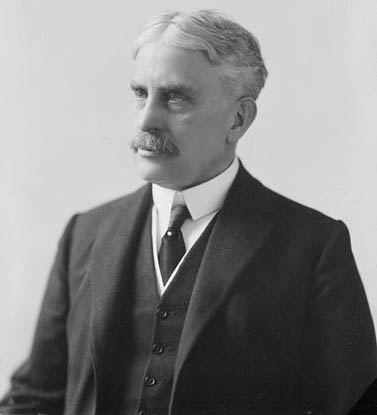
Robert Borden

- January 21 – Marie Prevost, actress (b. 1896)
- January 29 – Marc-Aurèle de Foy Suzor-Coté, painter and sculptor (b. 1869)
- February 16 – Rodmond Roblin, businessman, politician and 9th Premier of Manitoba (b. 1853)
- March 8 – Howie Morenz, ice hockey player (b. 1902)
- June 10 – Robert Borden, lawyer, politician and 8th Prime Minister of Canada (b. 1854)

=== July to December ===
- July 25 – Charles E. Saunders, agronomist (b. 1867)
- October 13 – Simon Fraser Tolmie, politician and 21st Premier of British Columbia (b. 1867)
- November 21 – Matthew Robert Blake, politician (b. 1876)
- December 27 – John Douglas Hazen, politician and 12th Premier of New Brunswick (b. 1860)

== See also ==
- List of Canadian films
