= 1872 in Canada =

- Decades: 1850s; 1860s; 1870s; 1880s; 1890s
- See also: History of Canada; Timeline of Canadian history; List of years in Canada

Events from the year 1872 in Canada.

== Incumbents ==
=== Crown ===
- Monarch – Victoria

=== Federal government ===
- Governor General – John Young, 1st Baron Lisgar (until June 25) then Frederick Hamilton-Temple-Blackwood
- Prime Minister – John A. Macdonald
- Parliament – 1st (until 8 July)

=== Provincial governments ===
==== Lieutenant governors ====
- Lieutenant Governor of British Columbia – Joseph Trutch
- Lieutenant Governor of Manitoba – Adams George Archibald (until December 2) then Alexander Morris
- Lieutenant Governor of New Brunswick – Lemuel Allan Wilmot
- Lieutenant Governor of Nova Scotia – Charles Hastings Doyle
- Lieutenant Governor of Ontario – William Pearce Howland
- Lieutenant Governor of Quebec – Narcisse-Fortunat Belleau

==== Premiers ====
- Premier of British Columbia – John Foster McCreight (until December 23) then Amor De Cosmos
- Premier of Manitoba – Marc-Amable Girard (until March 14) then Henry Joseph Clarke
- Premier of New Brunswick – George Luther Hathaway (until July 5) then George Edwin King
- Premier of Nova Scotia – William Annand
- Premier of Ontario – Edward Blake (until October 25) then Oliver Mowat
- Premier of Quebec – Pierre-Joseph-Olivier Chauveau

=== Territorial governments ===
==== Lieutenant governors ====
- Lieutenant Governor of the North-West Territories – Adams George Archibald (until December 2) then Francis Godschall Johnson (April 9 to December 5) then Alexander Morris

== Events ==
- March 14 – Henry Joseph Clarke becomes premier of Manitoba, replacing Marc-Amable Girard.
- March 25 – The beginning of the Toronto Printers' Strike for a nine-hour day.
- March 31 – The first issue of the Toronto Mail, which would later be merged into The Globe and Mail, is published.
- April 15 – Ten thousand demonstrate at Queen's Park in support of the striking Toronto printers. The police, prompted by the Masters Printers' Association and its leader, George Brown of the Globe, arrest the entire 24-man strike committee.
- April 18 – John A. Macdonald introduces a bill to legalize trade unions.
- April 25 – The first issue of the weekly Ontario Workman is published by the Toronto Trades Assembly. It is Canada's first labour newspaper.
- May 15 – In the first nationwide labour protest, marchers across the land press for the nine-hour workday.
- June 14 – The Trade Unions Act is passed in parliament, legalizing labour unions. The Criminal Law Amendment Act is also passed, making picketing illegal.
- June 22 – A Grand Trunk Railway express passenger train from Toronto to Montreal derails near Shannonville, Ontario, killing 34.
- June 25 – Frederick Temple Hamilton-Temple-Blackwood, 1st Earl of Dufferin becomes Governor General of Canada.
- July 20 – October 12: In the 1872 federal election Sir John A. Macdonald's Conservatives are re-elected.
- October 31 – Oliver Mowat becomes Premier of Ontario replaces the retiring Edward Blake.
- November 21 – Victoria Memorial (Montreal) unveiled.
- December 23 – Amor De Cosmos becomes premier of British Columbia, replacing John McCreight.

=== Full date unknown ===
- The federal Dominion Lands Act is passed, to provide land to settlers for only a small fee.
- The Manitoba Free Press is first published.
- Simpson's chain of stores founded.
- A British Columbia law bans all Asian and First Nations peoples from voting.
- George King becomes premier of New Brunswick for the second time, replacing George Luther Hathaway.
- Elijah McCoy, born in Colchester, Ontario, invents the first of his many devices to oil engines used on trains and in factories.
- The new Patent Act encourages import or licensing of technology and foreign patents by allowing legal use of patents in Canada if not registered in Canada within two years.
- An award of arbitration sets the final boundary between Canada and the United States in the Gulf of Georgia and the Strait of Juan de Fuca, ending the San Juan boundary dispute.

== Births ==
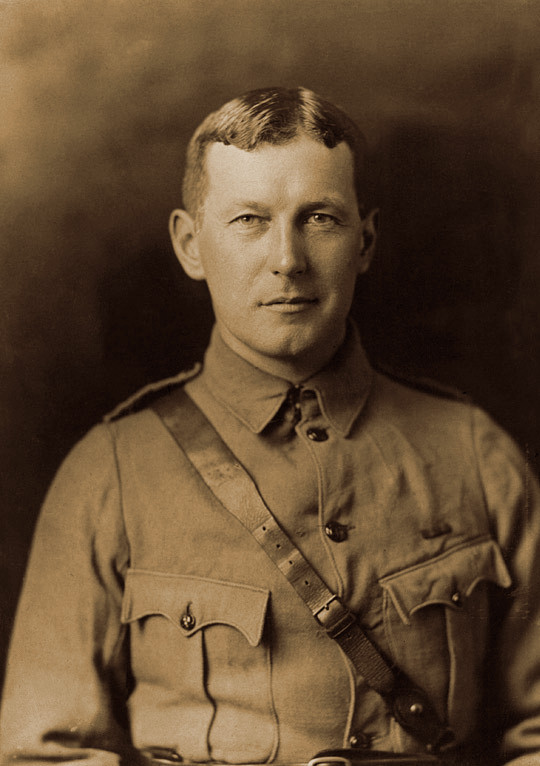
John McCrae in uniform, circa 1914

- June 24 – Pierre-Ernest Boivin, politician and businessman (d.1938)
- August 23 – Egerton Reuben Stedman, politician (d. 1946)
- August 25 – John Campbell Elliott, lawyer and politician (d.1941)
- October 17 – Samuel Wickett, businessman
- October 26 – Alfred Edmond Bourgeois, politician (d.1939)
- November 10 – Frederick C. Alderdice, businessman, politician and last Prime Minister of Newfoundland (d.1936)
- November 30 – John McCrae, poet, physician, author, artist and soldier (d.1918)
- December 23 – Charles Bélec, politician (d.1958)

== Deaths ==
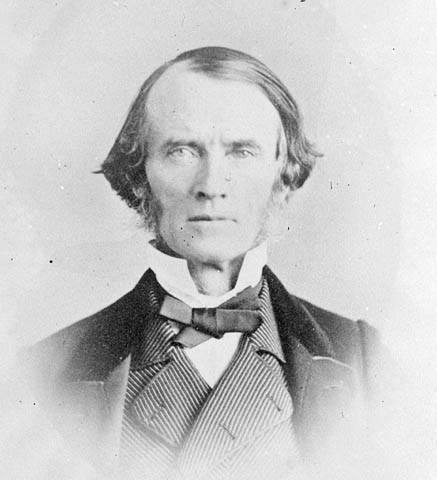
John Sandfield Macdonald

- April 8 – Cornelius Krieghoff, artist (b.1815)
- June 1 – John Sandfield Macdonald, Premier of Ontario (b. 1812)
- June 20 – Phoebe Campbell (b. 1847)
- July 5 – George Luther Hathaway, 3rd Premier of New Brunswick (b.1813)
- July 14 – John Bolton, businessman and politician (b. 1824)
- August 22 – John Bethune, Anglican clergyman (b. 1791)
- September 1 – John Kent, Premier of Newfoundland (b.1805)

== Historical documents ==
Federal agriculture minister points to "millions of unsettled acres of prairie" for wheat and "homes of many millions of men from the old world"

Privy Council committee recommends terms to encourage Mennonites to immigrate

Government fails to establish some agreed-to First Nations reserves, while settlers steal the timber

Sandford Fleming reports on difficulties surveying the route of the Canadian Pacific Railway

Indigenous paddlers race each other on the CPR survey expedition
