= 1871 in Canada =

- Decades: 1850s; 1860s; 1870s; 1880s; 1890s
- See also: History of Canada; Timeline of Canadian history; List of years in Canada

Events from the year 1871 in Canada.

== Incumbents ==
=== Crown ===
- Monarch – Victoria

=== Federal government ===
- Governor General – John Young, 1st Baron Lisgar
- Prime Minister – John A. Macdonald
- Parliament – 1st

=== Provincial governments ===
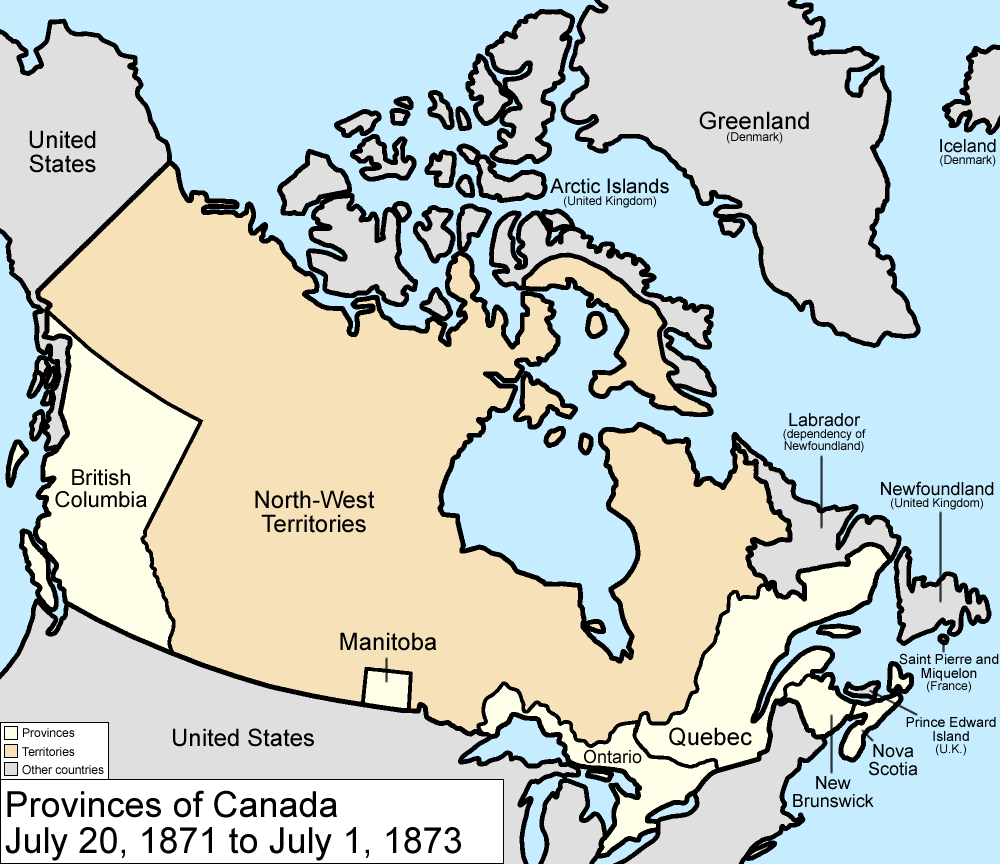
Canada provinces 1871–1873

==== Lieutenant governors ====
- Lieutenant Governor of British Columbia – Joseph Trutch (from July 5)
- Lieutenant Governor of Manitoba – Adams George Archibald
- Lieutenant Governor of New Brunswick – Lemuel Allan Wilmot
- Lieutenant Governor of Nova Scotia – Charles Hastings Doyle
- Lieutenant Governor of Ontario – William Pearce Howland
- Lieutenant Governor of Quebec – Narcisse-Fortunat Belleau

==== Premiers ====
- Premier of British Columbia – John Foster McCreight (from November 14)
- Premier of Manitoba – Alfred Boyd (until December 14) then Marc-Amable Girard
- Premier of New Brunswick – George Edwin King (until February 21) then George Luther Hathaway
- Premier of Nova Scotia – William Annand
- Premier of Ontario – John Sandfield Macdonald (until December 20) then Edward Blake
- Premier of Quebec – Pierre-Joseph-Olivier Chauveau

=== Territorial governments ===
==== Lieutenant governors ====
- Lieutenant Governor of the Northwest Territories – Adams George Archibald

== Elections ==
- March 21 – The 1871 Ontario election: Edward Blake's Liberals win a majority, defeating J. S. Macdonald's Liberal-Conservatives
- May 16 – The 1871 Nova Scotia election: William Annand's Liberals win a second consecutive majority
- Oct 16 – Dec 15 – The 1871 British Columbia election

== Events ==
=== January to June ===
- March 15 – Beginning of the first session of the 1st Manitoba Legislature
- April 2 – The first Canadian census finds the population to be 3,689,257
- May 8 – The Treaty of Washington reaches agreements on fishing rights and Great Lakes trade between Canada and the United States
- May 17 – New Brunswick abandons separate schools.

=== July to December ===
- July 15 – Phoebe Campbell murders her husband with an axe. She is hanged the next year.
- July 20 – British Columbia joins Confederation.
- July 25 – Treaty 1, the first of a number of treaties with western Canada's First Nations, is signed
- August 17 – Treaty 2 is signed
- November 11 – The last of the British Army leaves Canada
- November 13 – John McCreight becomes the first premier of British Columbia
- December 14 – Marc-Amable Girard becomes the first Franco-Manitoban of premier of Manitoba, replacing Alfred Boyd
- December 20 – Edward Blake becomes premier of Ontario, replacing J. S. Macdonald.

=== Full date unknown ===
- Meteorological Service of Canada is formed
- Parliament legalizes the use of the metric system
- Goldwin Smith immigrates to Canada
- Ontario Schools Act is passed in Ontario, requiring all students aged 7 to 12 to attend school.
- The 1871 Quebec election : Pierre-Joseph-Olivier Chauveau's Conservatives win a second consecutive majority

== Births ==
George Stewart Henry

- January 30 – Wilfred Lucas, actor, film director and screenwriter (d. 1940)
- May 14 – Walter Stanley Monroe, businessman, politician and Prime Minister of Newfoundland (d. 1952)
- July 16 – George Stewart Henry, politician and 10th Premier of Ontario (d. 1958)
- July 25 – Richard Turner, soldier and recipient of the Victoria Cross (d. 1961)
- August 4 – Robert Hamilton Butts, politician (d. 1943)
- September 8 – Samuel McLaughlin, businessman and philanthropist (d. 1972)
- September 9 – Hugh Robson, politician and judge
- October 31 – Alexander Stirling MacMillan, businessman, politician and Premier of Nova Scotia (d. 1955)
- December 2 – Stanislas Blanchard, politician (d. 1949)
- December 13 – Emily Carr, artist and writer (d. 1945)

== Deaths ==
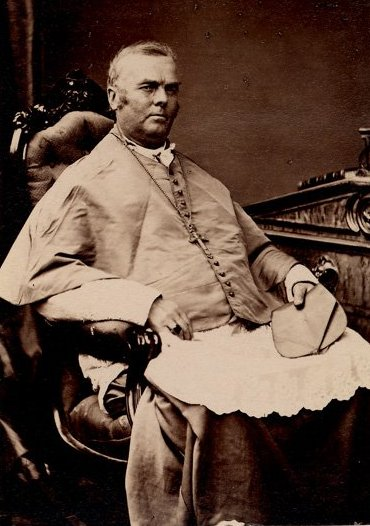
Modeste Demers

- January 29 – Philippe-Joseph Aubert de Gaspé, lawyer, writer, fifth and last seigneur of Saint-Jean-Port-Joli (L'Islet County) (b.1786)
- January 31 – John Ross, lawyer, politician, and businessman. (b. 1818)
- February 20 – Paul Kane, artist (b.1810)
- March 11 – John Heckman, political figure (b.1785)
- July 28 – Modeste Demers, missionary (b.1809)
- September 23 – Louis-Joseph Papineau, lawyer, politician and reformist (b.1786)
- November 18 – Enos Collins, seaman, merchant, financier, and legislator (b.1774)
