= 1869 in Canada =

- Decades: 1840s; 1850s; 1860s; 1870s; 1880s
- See also: History of Canada; Timeline of Canadian history; List of years in Canada

Events from the year 1869 in Canada.

== Incumbents ==
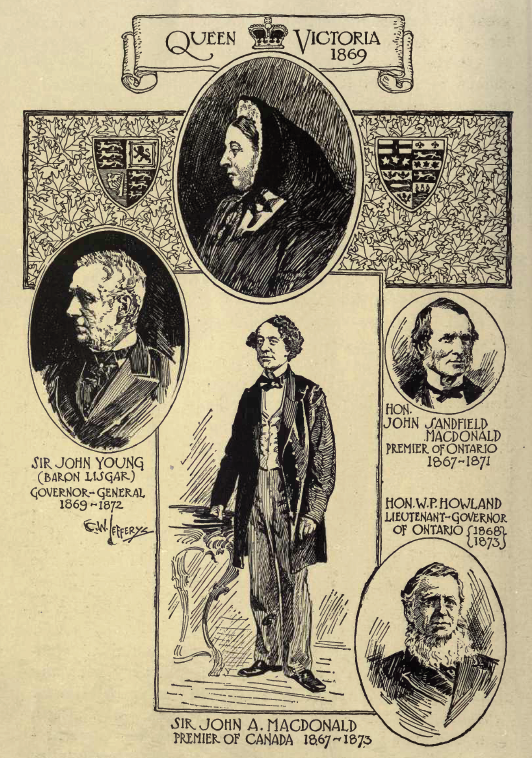
Some of the incumbents of 1869

=== Crown ===
- Monarch – Victoria

=== Federal government ===
- Governor General – Charles Monck, 4th Viscount Monck (until February 2) then John Young, 1st Baron Lisgar
- Prime Minister – John A. Macdonald
- Parliament – 1st

=== Provincial governments ===
==== Lieutenant governors ====
- Lieutenant Governor of New Brunswick – Lemuel Allan Wilmot
- Lieutenant Governor of Nova Scotia – Charles Hastings Doyle
- Lieutenant Governor of Ontario – William Pearce Howland
- Lieutenant Governor of Quebec – Narcisse-Fortunat Belleau

==== Premiers ====
- Premier of New Brunswick – Andrew Rainsford Wetmore
- Premier of Nova Scotia – William Annand
- Premier of Ontario – John Sandfield Macdonald
- Premier of Quebec – Pierre-Joseph-Olivier Chauveau

== Events ==
- February 2 – Lord Lisgar replaces Viscount Monck of Ballytrammon as Governor General
- February 11 – Patrick James Whelan is hanged for the assassination of Thomas D'Arcy McGee
- October 9 – Sir Francis Hincks becomes Minister of Finance
- October 24 – The Canadian Illustrated News is founded in Montreal.
- November 19 – The Deed of Surrender recognizes the purchase of Rupert's Land and the North-Western Territory from the Hudson's Bay Company: the lands are placed under the direct control of the Crown, but do not yet formally belong to Canada.

=== Full date unknown ===
- Timothy Eaton opens his first store in Toronto
- Newfoundland rejects Confederation with Canada
- 1869 Newfoundland general election
- Red River Rebellion begins
- George Hunt founds Huntsville, Ontario
- 1869 to 1870 – Smallpox epidemic strikes Canadian Plains tribes, including Blackfeet, Piegan, and Blood.
- Maria Susan Rye began bringing groups of children from poorhouses and orphanages to Canada from England.

== Sport ==
- November 3 – Hamilton Tigers Canadian football team is founded

== Births ==
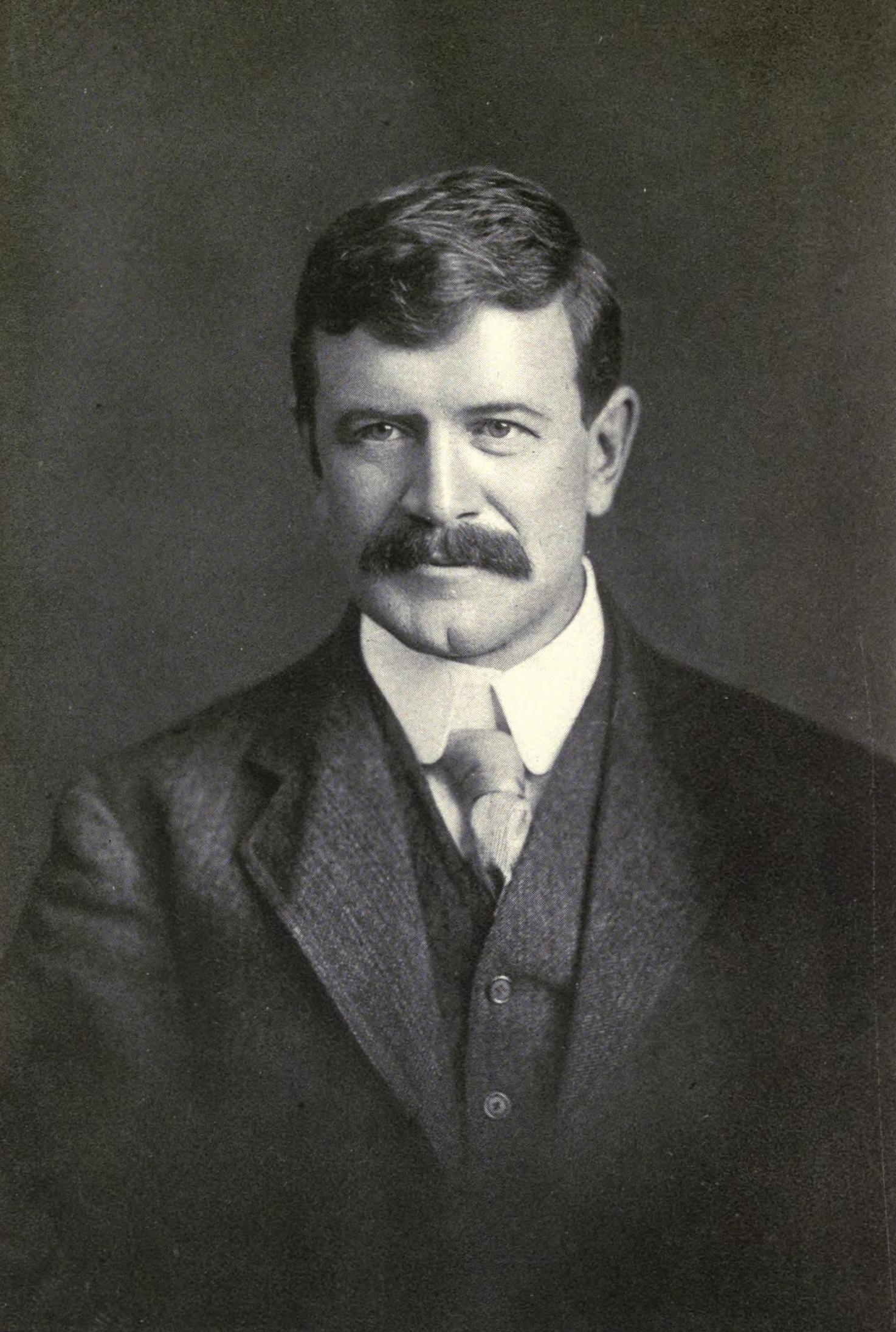
Stephen Leacock

- March 18 – Maude Abbott, physician (d.1940)
- April 6 – Marc-Aurèle de Foy Suzor-Coté, painter and sculptor (d.1937)
- June 20 – William Donald Ross, financier, banker and Lieutenant Governor of Ontario (d.1947)
- August 25 – Charles William Jefferys, artist and historian (d.1951)
- November 25 – Herbert Greenfield, politician and 4th Premier of Alberta (d.1949)
- December 18 – William Sanford Evans, politician (d.1950)
- December 30 – Stephen Leacock, writer and economist (d.1944)

== Deaths ==
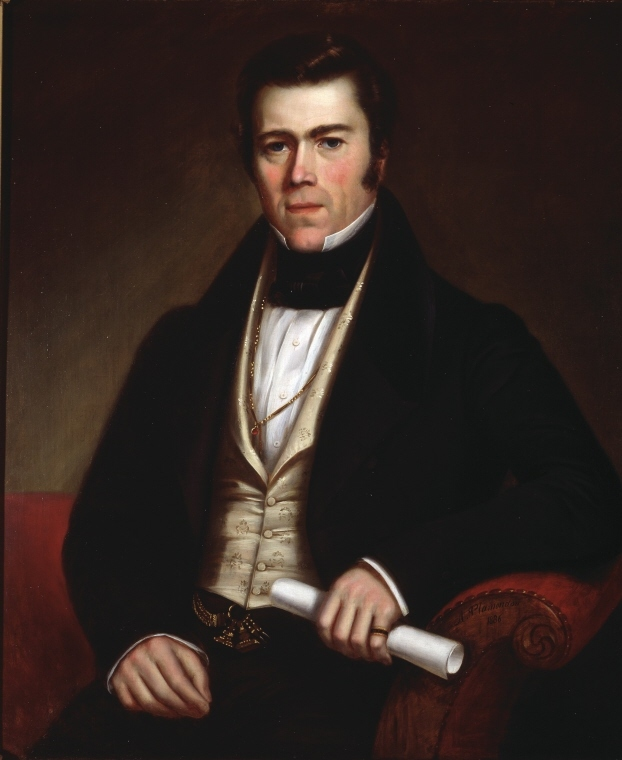
John Redpath in 1836

- February 11 – Patrick J. Whelan, tailor and alleged Fenian sympathizer executed following the 1868 assassination of Canadian journalist and politician Thomas D'Arcy McGee (b.1840)
- March 5 – John Redpath, Scots-Quebecer businessman and philanthropist (b.1796)
- August 1 – Louis-Charles Boucher de Niverville, lawyer and politician (b.1825)
