= 1875 in Canada =

- Decades: 1850s; 1860s; 1870s; 1880s; 1890s
- See also: History of Canada; Timeline of Canadian history; List of years in Canada

Events from the year 1875 in Canada.

== Incumbents ==
=== Crown ===
- Monarch – Victoria

=== Federal government ===
- Governor General – Frederick Hamilton-Temple-Blackwood
- Prime Minister – Alexander Mackenzie
- Chief Justice – William Buell Richards (Ontario) (from 30 September 1875)
- Parliament – 3rd

=== Provincial governments ===
==== Lieutenant governors ====
- Lieutenant Governor of British Columbia – Joseph Trutch
- Lieutenant Governor of Manitoba – Alexander Morris
- Lieutenant Governor of New Brunswick – Samuel Leonard Tilley
- Lieutenant Governor of Nova Scotia – Adams George Archibald
- Lieutenant Governor of Ontario – John Willoughby Crawford (until May 13) then Donald Alexander Macdonald (from May 18)
- Lieutenant Governor of Prince Edward Island – Robert Hodgson
- Lieutenant Governor of Quebec – René-Édouard Caron

==== Premiers ====
- Premier of British Columbia – George Anthony Walkem
- Premier of Manitoba – Robert Atkinson Davis
- Premier of New Brunswick – George Edwin King
- Premier of Nova Scotia – William Annand (until May 8) then Philip Carteret Hill (from May 11)
- Premier of Ontario – Oliver Mowat
- Premier of Prince Edward Island – Lemuel Cambridge Owen
- Premier of Quebec – Charles Boucher de Boucherville

=== Territorial governments ===
==== Lieutenant governors ====
- Lieutenant Governor of the Northwest Territories – Alexander Morris

== Events ==
- January 14 – The Halifax Herald is first published.
- January 18 – 1875 Ontario election: Sir Oliver Mowat's Liberals win a second consecutive majority.
- March 1 – The Hospital for Sick Children (Toronto) is founded.
- April 5 – The Supreme Court of Canada is created.
- April 8 – The Northwest Territories is given a lieutenant-governor separate from that of Manitoba.
- May 11 – Philip Carteret Hill becomes premier of Nova Scotia, replacing William Annand.
- June 1 – Construction begins on the Canadian Pacific Railway.
- June 30 – The Land Purchase Act comes into effect in Prince Edward Island in order to address the "land question", one of the issues that had prompted the colony to join Confederation.
- July 7 – 1875 Quebec election: Charles-Eugène Boucher de Boucherville's Conservatives win a third consecutive majority.
- July 20 – 1875 British Columbia election.
- September 2 – The Guibord Affair, violence resulting from the 1874 Guibord case, breaks out.

=== Full date unknown ===
- Convent Scandal: During the winter in Montreal, typhoid fever strikes at a convent school. The corpses of the victims are filched by body-snatchers before relatives arrive from America, causing much furor. Eventually the Anatomy Act of Quebec is changed over it.
- Louis Riel is granted amnesty with the condition that he be banished for five years.
- Jennifer Trout becomes the first woman licensed to practise medicine in Canada, although Emily Stowe has been doing so without a licence in Toronto since 1867.
- Grace Lockhart receives from Mount Allison University the first Bachelor of Arts degree awarded to a woman.

== Births ==
- February 26 – Edith Jane Miller, concert contralto singer (d. 1936)
- March 29 – Harry James Barber, politician (d.1959)
- June 12 – Sam De Grasse, actor (d.1953)

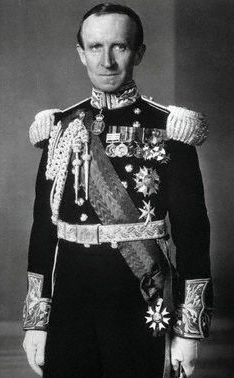
John Buchan, 1st Baron Tweedsmuir

- June 15 – Herman Smith-Johannsen, ski pioneer and supercentenarian (d.1987)
- August 2 – Albert Hickman, politician and 17th Prime Minister of Newfoundland (d.1943)
- August 21 – Winnifred Eaton, author (d.1954)
- August 22 – François Blais, politician (d.1949)
- August 26 – John Buchan, 1st Baron Tweedsmuir, novelist, politician and 15th Governor General of Canada (d.1940)
- September 6 – Edith Berkeley, biologist (d.1963)
- October 5 – Anne-Marie Huguenin, journalist (d.1943)
- November 19 – John Knox Blair, politician, physician and teacher (d.1950)
- December 5 – Arthur Currie, World War I general (d.1933)

== Deaths ==
- March 1 – Henry Kellett, officer in the Royal Navy, oceanographer, Arctic explorer (b.1806)
- June 22 – William Edmond Logan, geologist (b.1798)
- July 15 – Charles La Rocque, priest and third Bishop of Saint-Hyacinthe (b.1809)
- July 22 – Amable Éno, dit Deschamps, political figure (b.1785)
- August 21 – George Coles, Premier of Prince Edward Island (b.1810)
- December 14 – Marie-Anne Gaboury, female explorer (b.1780)

== Historical documents ==
Now in Opposition, J.A. Macdonald and Charles Tupper criticize the Liberal government

Rev. George Bryce details Presbyterian Church's "heathen" mission work among 80,000 Indigenous people in North-West Territories

Painting: Huron-Wendat Chief Telari-o-lin's self-portrait
