= William James Anderson =

Scottish physician who emigrated to Canada

William James Anderson (2 November 1812 – 15 May 1873) was a physician, amateur geologist and historian of Scottish descent.

He studied medicine at Edinburgh, where he obtained the degree of MD. Anderson was a physician in the Maritimes in the 1830s. At that time he developed an interest in the history and geology of Nova Scotia. After a serious health problem he left the medical profession and the Maritimes in 1847. He was in the lumber business in Upper Canada and moved to Quebec City in 1860.

In 1873, Anderson died in Quebec City of Tuberculosis. He was survived by a wife and daughter.
