= Francis Pym Harding =

Canadian politician

Major-General Francis Pym Harding CB

2nd Lieutenant Governor of New Brunswick
- In office 18 October 1867 – 22 July 1868
- Monarch: Victoria
- Governor General: The Viscount Monck
- Premier: Andrew Rainsford Wetmore
- Preceded by: Charles Hastings Doyle
- Succeeded by: Lemuel Allan Wilmot

Personal details
- Born: 23 September 1821 Lymington, Hampshire, England
- Died: 25 February 1875 (aged 53) Lymington, Hampshire, England
- Occupation: Soldier
- Profession: Politician

Francis Pym Harding CB (23 September 1821 – 25 February 1875) was a British Army officer and the second Lieutenant Governor of New Brunswick from 1867 to 1868.

Born in The Grove, Lymington, Hampshire, England, Harding was an officer in the 22nd Foot (Cheshire Regiment) and was promoted to colonel in 1858. He was transferred from Malta to New Brunswick in 1866 and was appointed commanding officer. As the senior military officer, he was recommended by Charles Hastings Doyle for the position of Lieutenant Governor of New Brunswick and was appointed in 1867. In 1868, he was promoted to the rank of major general and returned to England in 1869.

He died in Grove, Lymington, Hampshire, England in 1875.
