= Edmund Fanning (colonial administrator) =

Canadian politician

General Edmund Fanning
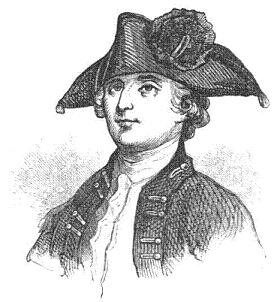
- Drawing of Fanning, 1852, by Benson John Lossing

Lieutenant-Governor of Nova Scotia
- In office 1783–1786

Lieutenant-Governor of St. John's Island
- In office 1786–1805

Personal details
- Born: April 24, 1739
- Died: 28 February 1818 (aged 78)
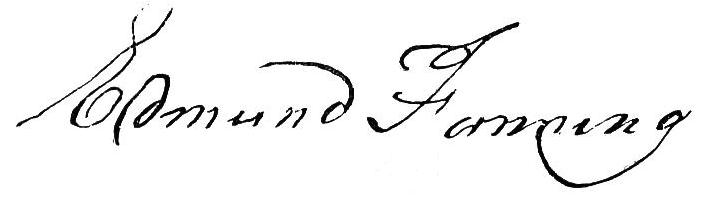
- Signature

Military service
- Allegiance: Great Britain
- Rank: General
- Commands: North Carolina militia King's American Regiment
- Battles/wars: War of the Regulation: Battle of Alamance; American Revolutionary War: Battle of Forts Clinton and Montgomery; Battle of Rhode Island; Tryon's raid; Siege of Charleston; Battle of Hobkirk's Hill; Battle of Eutaw Springs

Edmund Fanning (April 24, 1739 – February 28, 1818) was an American-born colonial administrator and military officer. Born in New York, he became a lawyer and politician in North Carolina in the 1760s. He first came to fame as the focus of hatred of the Regulators, and led anti-Regulator militia in the War of the Regulation. When the American Revolutionary War broke out, he was driven from his home in New York, and joined the British Army, recruiting other Loyalists. He served during campaigns in New England and the South. At the end of the war in 1783 he became a United Empire Loyalist, settling in Nova Scotia.

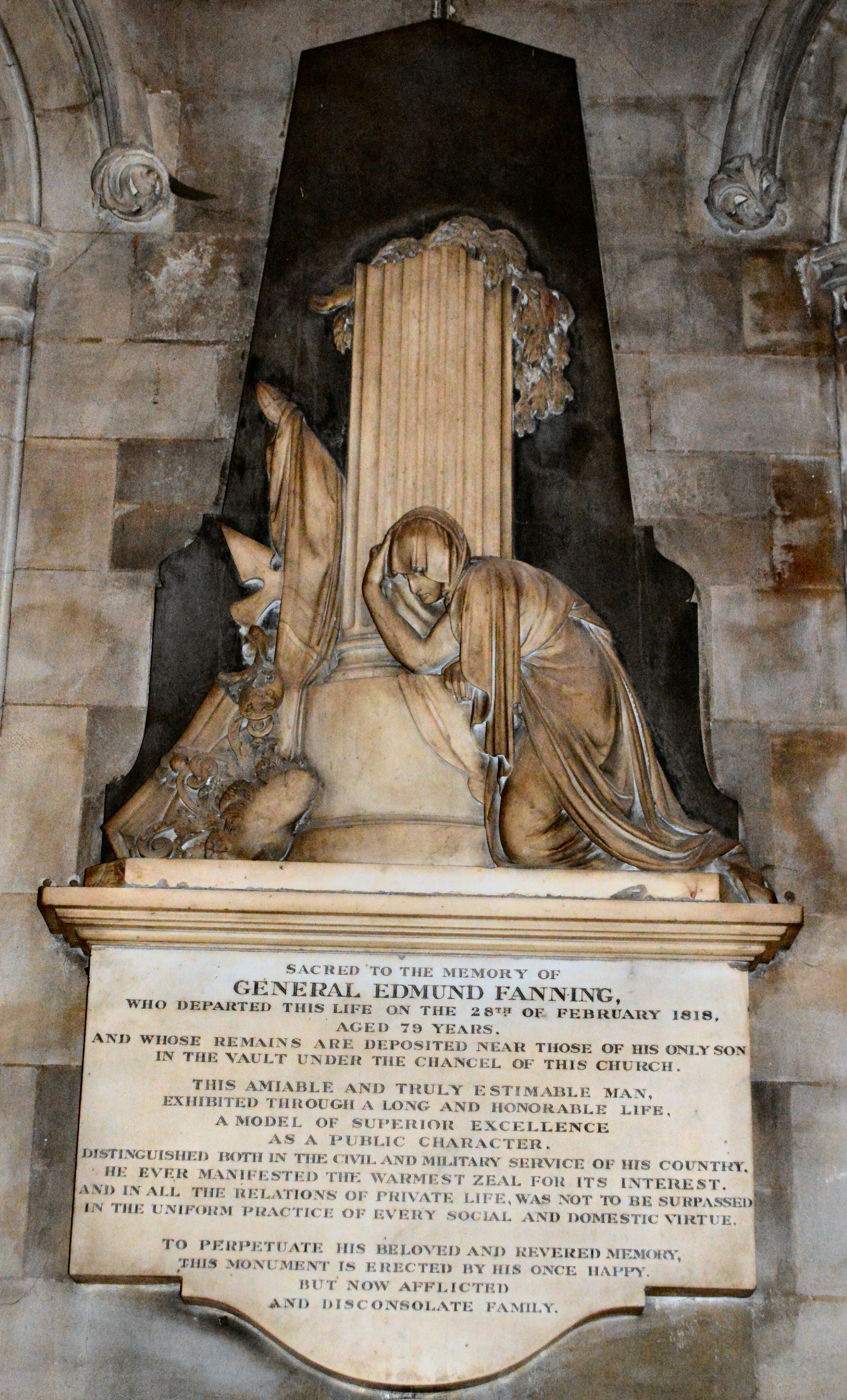
St Mary Abbots Church

Fanning was appointed lieutenant governor of Nova Scotia not long after his arrival, and helped oversee the resettlement of other Loyalist refugees in the province. In 1786 he was appointed lieutenant governor of Saint John's Island, which was renamed Prince Edward Island during his tenure. He served in that post until 1813. He retired to London, where he died in 1818.

== Life ==
Edmund Fanning was born in the Town of Southold on Long Island in the colony of New York to Captain James Fanning and Hannah Smith. Nova Scotia Governor John Parr believed Fanning was, like Parr, a Protestant Irishman, and was from Ulster and owned great estates there.

He graduated from Yale College in 1757. He then moved to the Province of North Carolina in 1761 where he read law with Attorney-General Robert Jones and settled in Hillsborough. He held several local political posts and became a protégé of colonial governor William Tryon. Fanning came into conflict with the leaders of the Regulator movement. He, along with lawyer Francis Nash, was charged with extorting money from the local residents, but was fined only a small fine. After several riots, the movement was crushed by the army of the Sandy Creek Baptist Militia led by Tryon at the Battle of Alamance on May 16, 1771.

Fanning followed Tryon to New York as his personal secretary. At the start of the American Revolutionary War, revolutionaries drove Fanning from his home, forcing him to seek refuge aboard HMS Asia in the New York harbor. After being commissioned a colonel by General William Howe, Fanning raised a regiment of Loyalists named the King's American Regiment on Staten Island, New York. He was wounded twice during the war and was credited with saving Yale from being razed by British forces during Tryon's raid, a series of raids in New Haven led by Tryon. Fanning was granted an honorary law degree in 1803 as thanks for this action. He was later appointed to the office of surveyor general, which he retained until he fled, with other Loyalists, to Nova Scotia in 1783.

Fanning became lieutenant-governor of Nova Scotia on 23 September 1783, serving as deputy to Governor John Parr. On November 30, 1785, he married Phoebe Maria Burns. In 1786, he was appointed lieutenant governor of St. John's Island (which was later renamed Prince Edward Island) by the Home Secretary, Thomas Townshend, 1st Viscount Sydney, a post which he held for almost 19 years, resigning in 1805. Prince Edward Island's Government House, the official residence of the lieutenant governor, is often referred to as "Fanningbank" on the island, though Fanning never dwelt there. He was promoted to general of the British Army in 1808. He retired to London in 1813 and died there in 1818.

Despite having several children, Fanning had no grandchildren. He had two daughters, Lady Wood, who lived near London with her mother; the other daughter married a Captain Bentinck Cumberland, a nephew of Lord William Bentinck, and lived in Charlotte's Town, Prince Edward Island. He also had several prominent nephews, including the like-named explorer Edmund Fanning, the war hero Nathaniel Fanning, and the celebrated attorney John Wickham. A great nephew was James Fannin.

== Bibliography ==
- Powell, William, ed. (1996). Dictionary of North Carolina Biography. Chapel Hill, NC: University of North Carolina Press. ISBN 978-0-8078-1329-4. OCLC 256355918.

Government offices
Preceded by Sir Andrew Hamond	Lieutenant Governor of Nova Scotia; 1783-1786; Served under: John Parr	Succeeded by John Parr
