= Thomas Carleton =

Canadian politician

General Thomas Carleton

1st Lieutenant Governor of New Brunswick
- In office 18 July 1784 – 2 February 1817
- Monarch: George III
- Preceded by: Post established
- Succeeded by: George Stracey Smyth

Personal details
- Born: c. 1735 Ireland
- Died: 2 February 1817 (aged 81–82) Ramsgate, Kent, England
- Resting place: St Swithun’s Church at Nately Scures, Hampshire, England; 51.272°N 1.0025°W
- Spouse(s): Hannah Foy, née Van Horn (m. 1783)

Military service
- Allegiance: United Kingdom
- Branch/service: British Army
- Years of service: 1753–1817
- Rank: General
- Battles/wars: Seven Years' War; American Revolutionary War; Siege of Quebec; French Revolutionary Wars; Napoleonic Wars

General Thomas Carleton (c. 1735 – 2 February 1817) was an British Army officer who was promoted to colonel during the American Revolutionary War after relieving the siege of Quebec in 1776. After the war, he was appointed as Lieutenant-Governor of New Brunswick, and supervised the resettlement of Loyalists from the United States in the province. He held this position until his death, although he was absent in England for the last fourteen years of his tenure, refusing orders to return in a dispute about seniority.

== Early life and education ==
Born in Strabane, County Tyrone, in Ulster, Ireland, to Christoper Carleton and his wife Catherine Ball, he was the younger brother of The 1st Baron Dorchester. As part of a military family, Thomas joined the British Army at a young age.

== Military career ==
In 1753, he was an ensign in the 20th Regiment of Foot and saw action with his regiment during the Seven Years' War. After the conclusion of the Seven Years' War, Thomas Carleton served as an observer during the Russo-Turkish War of 1768–1774.

In 1776 during the American Revolutionary War, as a lieutenant colonel, he arrived in Quebec City with forces to relieve his brother, Sir Guy Carleton, the Governor General of Canada, who was besieged in the city by Continental Army troops. With the death of Lt. Col. Patrick Gordon on July 25, 1776, Col. Carleton was promoted to command the 29th Regiment of Foot. In 1777, Thomas Carleton's nephew Christopher Carleton joined the 29th regiment as a major and served under his uncle's command for the rest of the war. Col. Thomas Carleton did not get along well with his new commander, Frederick Haldimand, who replaced Guy Carleton in 1778 as Governor General of Canada. He refused when in 1782 Haldimand demanded that he resign his position as quartermaster general before his planned departure for New York, where his brother Guy had replaced the disgraced Henry Clinton. Thomas Carleton returned to England where he lodged with Lord Shelburne, who at the time was First Lord of the Treasury and Leader of the House of Lords.

== Political career ==
In summer 1784, with the administration of Government safely under Shelburne's colleague Pitt the Younger, Col. Thomas Carleton was appointed as the first Lieutenant-Governor of New Brunswick. Here, he helped to re-settle the many Loyalists leaving the United States. He was made major-general in the regular army on 12 October 1793, and colonel commandant of a battalion of the 60th (Royal American) Regiment of Foot in August 1794.

Carleton saw off a censure motion and attempted ouster by some assemblymen, led by James Glenie, in the closing years of the 18th century; but Glenie had been found guilty in 1780 by a court-martial board, which included Carleton, "of having behaved unbecoming the Character of an Officer and a Gentleman on many occasions", and so future events between the two would necessarily have been poisoned.

Carleton would serve as Governor of New Brunswick until his death on February 2, 1817. In 1803 he departed for England and administered from there, as he never returned to the province, In view of heightened tensions following the 1807 Chesapeake–Leopard affair and New Brunswick's strategic position on the border with the United States, Carleton was ordered to return to his post. However, Carleton refused on the grounds that the new Governor General, Sir James Henry Craig, was only a lieutenant-general while Carleton was a full general, and that “officers of a superior rank in the King’s Army cannot with propriety serve under the command of inferiors”. Carleton's duties in New Brunswick had to be borne by a succession of local officers.

== Legacy ==
Of Carleton and wife Hannah Foy (née Van Horn) were born son William and daughters Emma and Anne. Stepson Captain Nathaniel Foy was born to Hannah in her first marriage.

Mount Carleton, the tallest mountain in New Brunswick, is named for him.

== Sources ==
- The American Journals of Lt. John Enys, John Enys and Elizabeth Cometti (editor), Syracuse University Press, 1976
- Travels Through the Interior Parts of America 1776-1781 Volumes 1 and 2, Thomas Anburey, Houghton Mifflin Company, 1923
- The Burning of the Valleys, Gavin K. Watt, Dundurn Press, 1997
- Carleton's Raid, Ida H. Washington and Paul A. Washington, Cherry Tree Books, 1977
