= History of Charlottetown =

History of Charlottetown, Canada

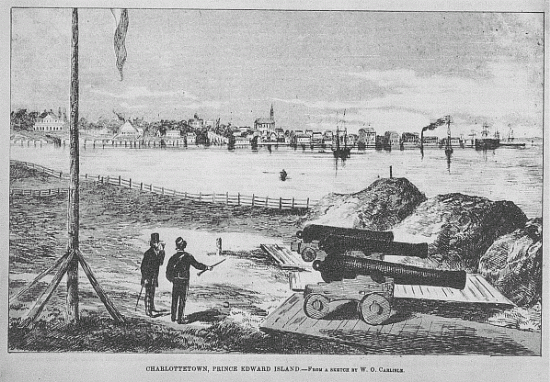
View of Charlottetown, 1872.

The History of Charlottetown can be traced back to the original French military settlement established on the site in 1720. Over the years Charlottetown has grown to become the largest and most important city on Prince Edward Island.

== 18th century ==
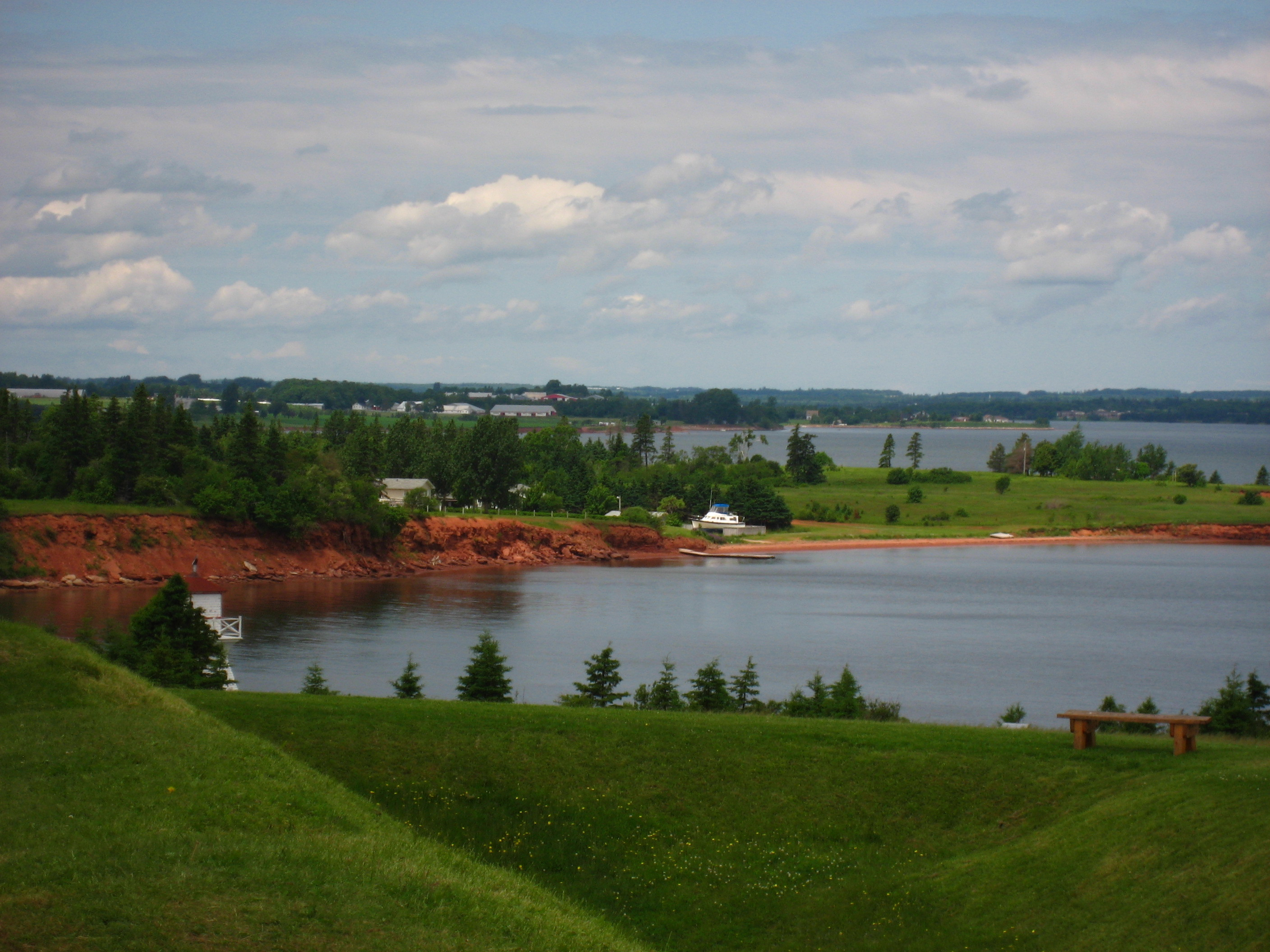
Fort Amherst, southwest of the city by the approaches to Charlottetown Harbour. The area was first settled there by the French in 1720.

The first European settlers in the area were French; personnel from Fortress Louisbourg founded a settlement in 1720 named Port-la-Joye on the southwestern part of the harbour opposite the present-day city. This settlement was led by Michel Haché-Gallant, who used his sloop to ferry Acadian settlers from Louisbourg.

During King George's War, the British had taken over the island. French officer Jean-Baptiste Nicolas Roch de Ramezay sent 500 men to attack the British troops in the Battle at Port-la-Joye. The French were successful in killing or taking prisoner forty British troops.

In August 1758, at the height of the Seven Years' War, a British fleet took control of the settlement and the rest of the island, promptly deporting those French settlers that they could find (this being fully three years after the original Acadian Expulsion in Nova Scotia). British forces built Fort Amherst near the site of the abandoned Port-la-Joye settlement to protect the entrance to the harbour. Charlottetown was selected as the site for the county seat of Queens County in the colonial survey of 1764 by Captain Samuel Holland of the Royal Engineers. A year later, Charlottetown was made the colonial capital of St. John's Island. Further surveys conducted between 1768–1771 established the street grid and public squares, which can be seen in the city's historic district. The town was named in honour of Queen Charlotte of Mecklenburg-Strelitz, consort of King George III.

On November 17, 1775, the colony's new capital was ransacked by Massachusetts-based privateers, participants in the American Revolutionary War. During the attack, the colonial seal was stolen and several prisoners, including Phillips Callbeck and Thomas Wright, were taken to Cambridge, Massachusetts and later released.

In 1793, land had been set aside by Governor Fanning on the western limits of the community for use by the "Administrator of Government" (the Governor), and as such it became known informally as "Fanning's Bank" or just "Fanning Bank".

On November 29, 1798, St. John's Island was renamed to Prince Edward Island in honour of Prince Edward, Duke of Kent and Strathearn who was the Commander-in-Chief, North America.

== 19th century ==
In 1805, the local British garrison constructed a harbour defence called "Fort Edward" to the west of the capital's waterfront and the "Prince Edward Battery" manned this facility.

In 1835, "Government House" was constructed at Fanning Bank as a residence for the colony's Governor. Today, it serves as the official residence for the Lieutenant Governor.

Between 1843 and 1847, a new legislative building was constructed in the community. Named "Province House", the completion of this structure was an important milestone in the history of the capital and it is still in use today as the provincial legislature and is currently the second-oldest legislative seat in Canada.

On April 17, 1855, Charlottetown was incorporated as a city, holding its first council meeting on August 11 that year. The community had 6,500 residents at the time of incorporation.

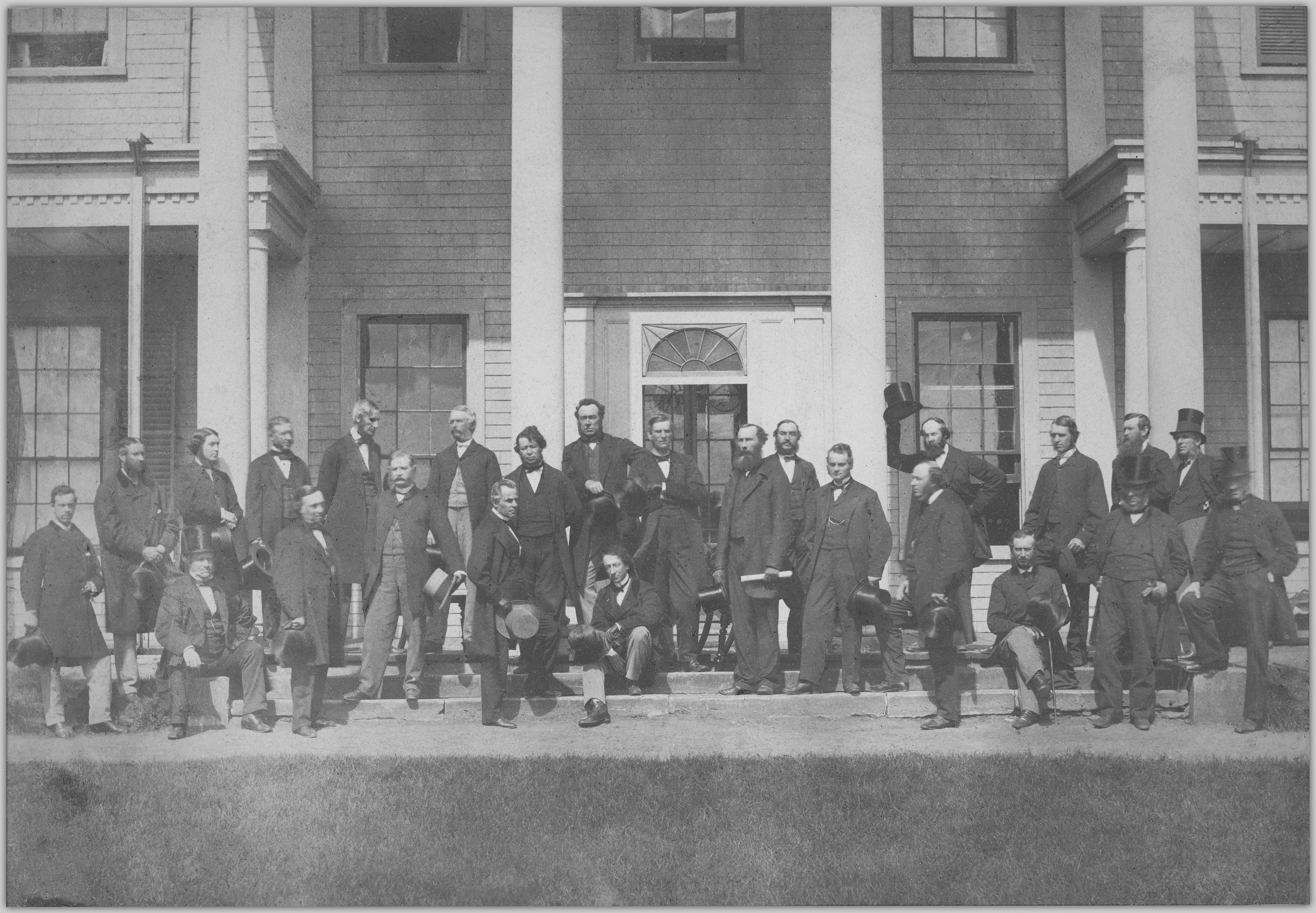
Members of the Charlottetown Conference, a conference to discuss Canadian Confederation, in front of Government House in 1864.

Between September 1 and September 7, 1864, Charlottetown hosted what is now termed the Charlottetown Conference. Although many of the meetings and negotiations which would lead to Canadian Confederation were held in Province House, various social events spilled over into the surrounding community.

On June 14, 1873 the "Government House Farm" at Fanning Bank was designated a municipal park, named Victoria Park in honour of Queen Victoria. Prince Edward Island entered Confederation on July 1, 1873.

Aside from being the seat of colonial government, the community came to be noted during the early nineteenth century for shipbuilding and its lumber industry as well as being a fishing port. The shipbuilding industry declined in the latter part of the nineteenth century. In August 1874, the Prince Edward Island Railway opened its main line between Charlottetown and Summerside. The railway, along with the shipping industry, would continue to drive industrial development on the waterfront for several decades to come.

The province's first health care facility, the Charlottetown Hospital, was opened by the Diocese of Charlottetown in 1879, which was followed by the publicly operated Prince Edward Island Hospital in 1884.

In 1885 the municipality saw its status upgraded to become a city.

== 20th century ==
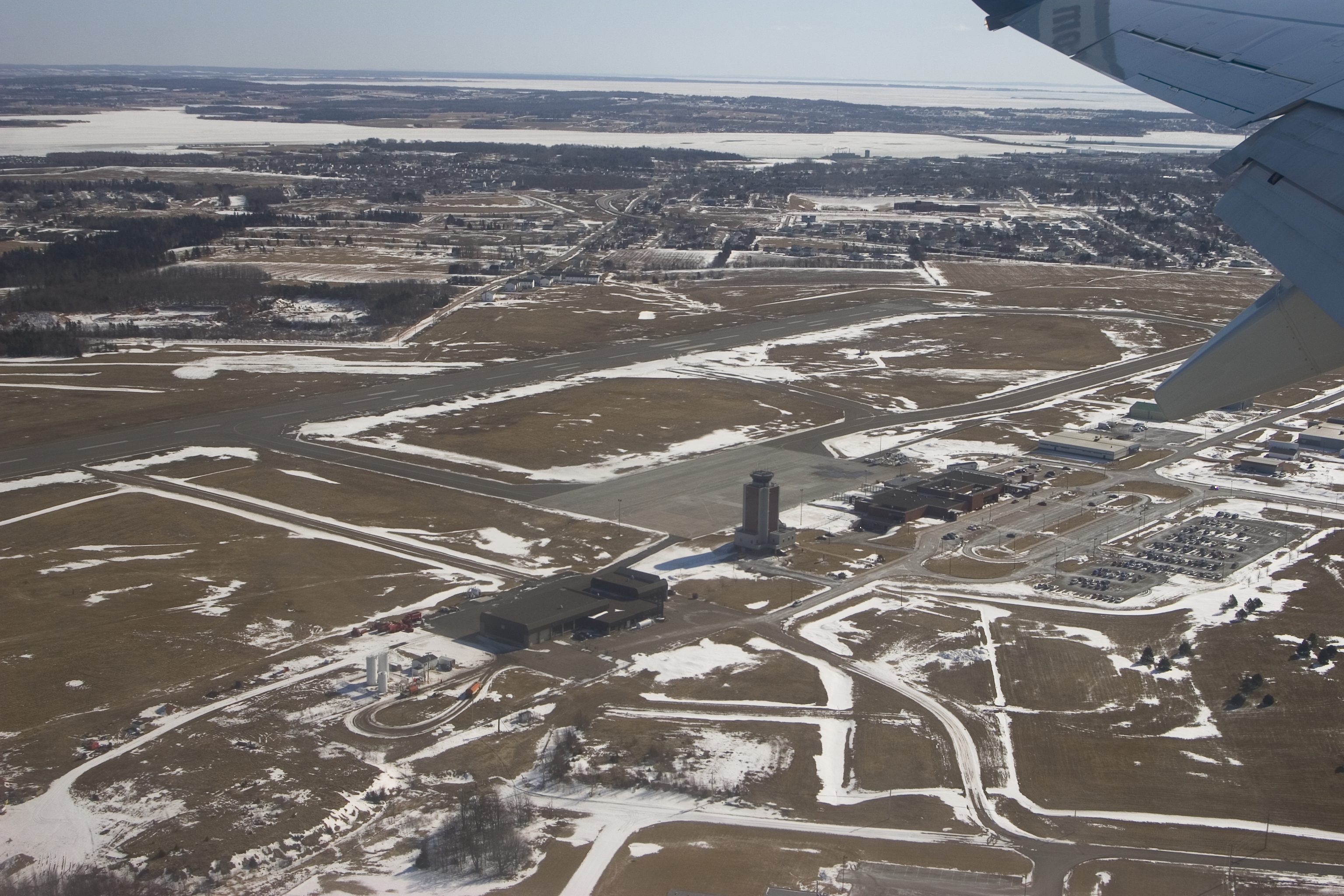
Charlottetown Airport from the air in 2006. The airport grew significantly during World War II, operating as RCAF Station Charlottetown.

Religion played a central role in the development of Charlottetown's institutions with non-denominational (i.e. Protestant) and Roman Catholic public schools (Catholic Queen Square, Notre Dame, and St. Josephs. vs Protestant West Kent and Prince Street), hospitals (Prince Edward Island Hospital vs. Charlottetown Hospital), and post-secondary institutions (Prince of Wales College vs. St. Dunstan's University) being instituted. St. Dunstan's was originally developed as a seminary for training priests, and the Maritime Christian College was founded in 1960 to train preachers for the Christian churches and churches of Christ in Prince Edward Island and the Maritime Provinces.

As with most communities in North America, the automobile shaped Charlottetown's development in the latter half of the twentieth century, when outlying farms in rural areas of Brighton, Spring Park, and Parkdale saw increased housing developments.

The Charlottetown airfield in the nearby rural community of Sherwood was upgraded as part of the British Commonwealth Air Training Plan and operated for the duration of World War II as RCAF Station Charlottetown, in conjunction with RCAF Station Mount Pleasant and RCAF Station Summerside. After the war the airfield was designated Charlottetown Airport. Charlottetown's shipyards also saw extensive use during World War II, being used for refits and upgrades to numerous Royal Canadian Navy warships. Further post-war development saw residential properties continue to expand in adjacent outlying areas, particularly in the neighbouring farming communities of Sherwood, West Royalty, and East Royalty.

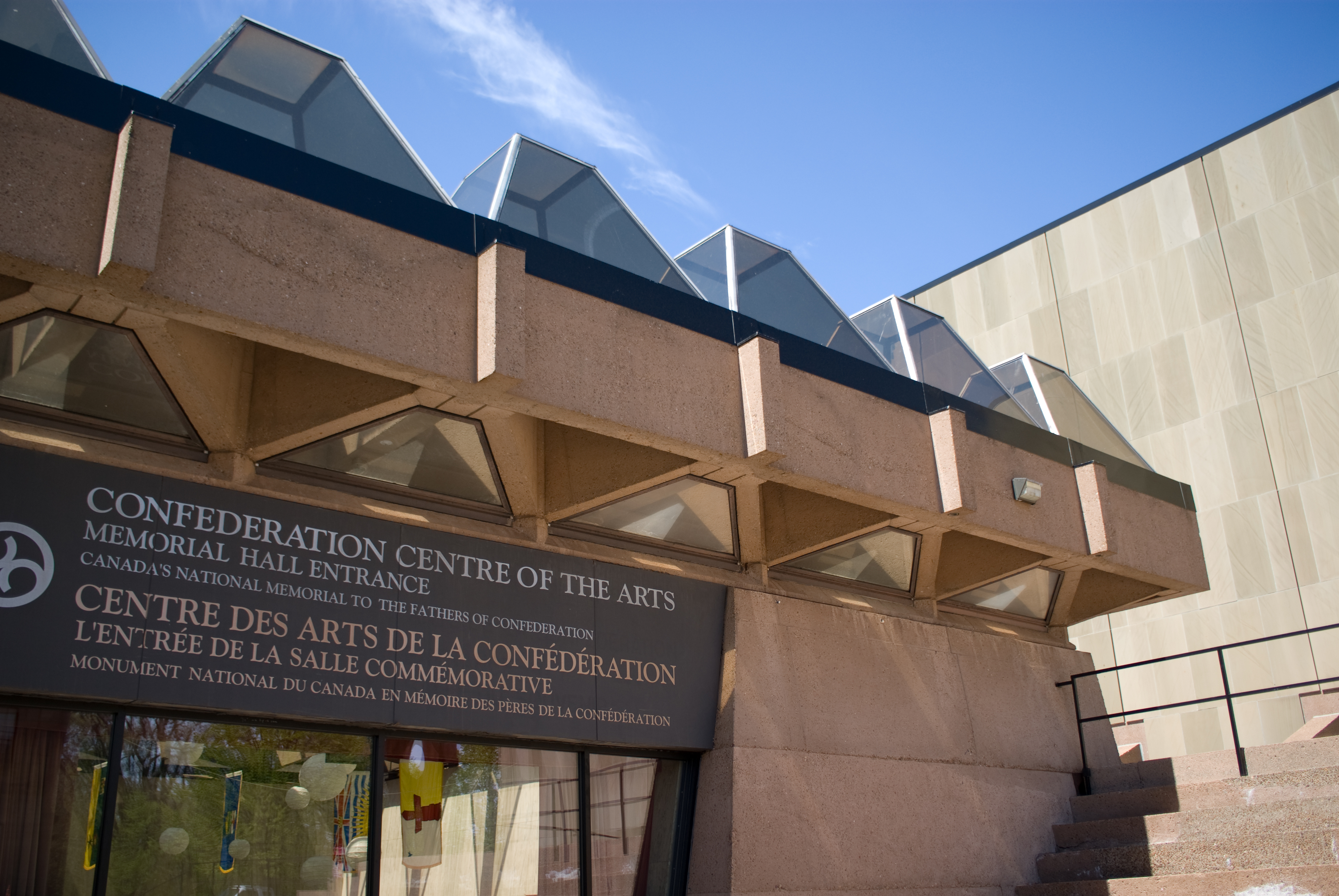
The Confederation Centre of the Arts was opened in 1964 as a memorial to the Fathers of Confederation.

In 1959, the suburban village of Spring Park was amalgamated into the city, extending the city's northern boundary from Kirkwood Drive to Hermitage Creek and included the campus of St. Dunstan's University.

To commemorate the centennial of the Charlottetown Conference, the ten provincial governments and the Government of Canada contributed to a national monument to the "Fathers of Confederation". The Confederation Centre of the Arts, which opened in 1964, as a gift to the residents of Prince Edward Island. The centre contains the Confederation Centre Art Gallery, a public library, and a mainstage theatre which has played to the Charlottetown Festival every summer since.

In the 1960s, new public schools were constructed in the community, and in 1969 the city became home to the amalgamated University of Prince Edward Island (UPEI), located on the campus of the former St. Dunstan's University. Together with the federal Department of Agriculture and Agri-Food's Charlottetown Experimental Farm (also known as Ravenwood Farm), these properties comprise a large green space surrounded by the city. The Prince of Wales College downtown campus became part of a new provincial community college system named Holland College, in honour of the island's famous surveyor. The P.E.I. Comprehensive Development Plan in the late 1960s greatly contributed to the expansion of the provincial government in Charlottetown for the next decade.

The Queen Elizabeth Hospital opened in 1982. In 1983, the national headquarters of the federal Department of Veterans Affairs was moved to Charlottetown as part of a nationwide federal government decentralization programme. In 1986, UPEI saw further expansion with the opening of the Atlantic Veterinary College.

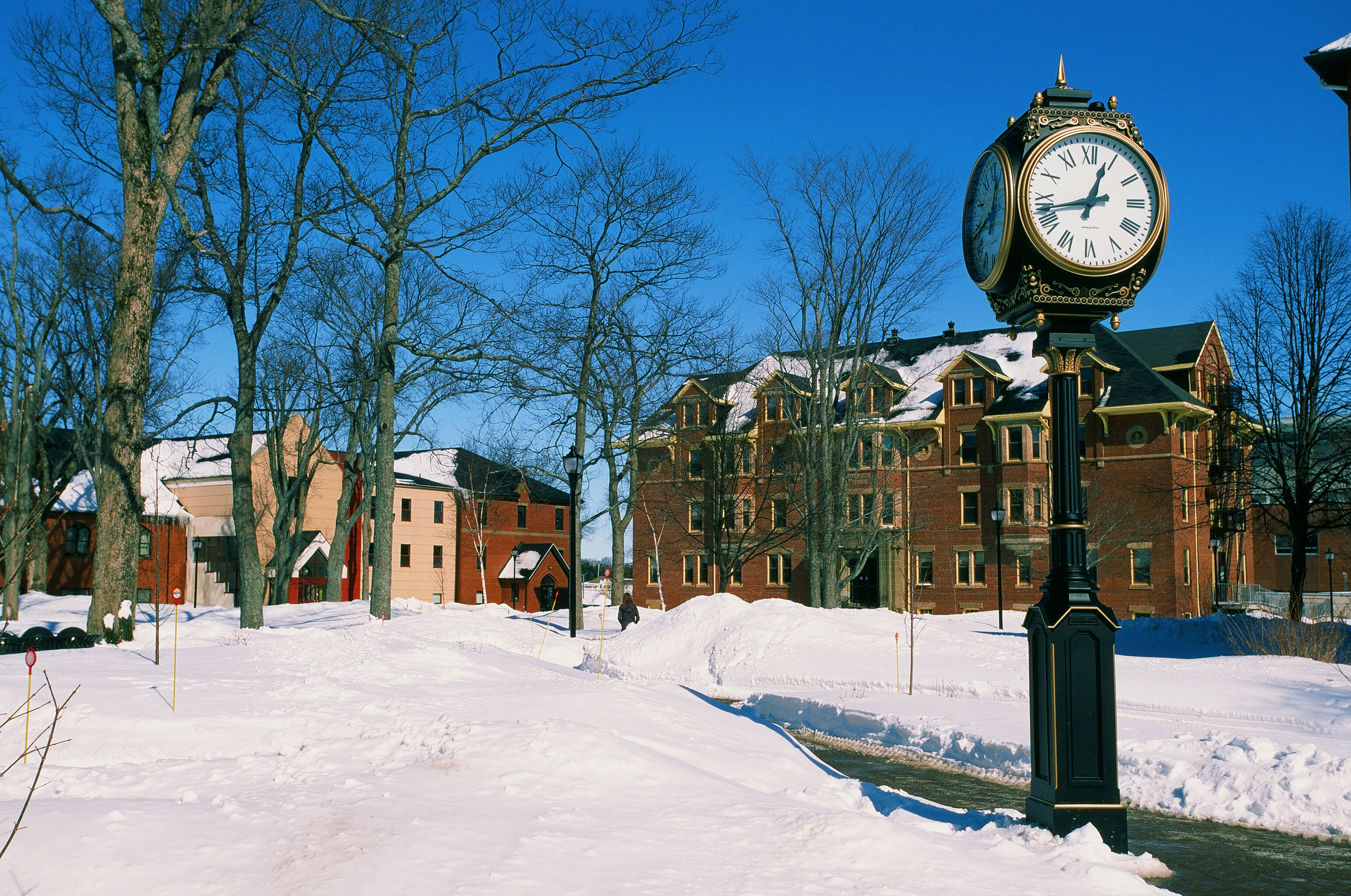
The "quads" of the University of Prince Edward Island. The university was established in 1969 through the merger of smaller post-secondary institutions.

Throughout the 1970s and 1980s, Charlottetown witnessed increased commercial office and retail development. A waterfront hotel and convention centre was completed in 1982 and helped to encourage diversification and renewal in the area, leading to several residential complexes and downtown shopping facilities. The abandonment of rail service in the province by CN Rail in December 1989 led to the railway and industrial lands at the east end of the waterfront being transformed into parks and cultural attractions.

The late 1990s and 2000s witnessed a change in the retail landscape with the opening of big box stores on the site of former traditional shopping centres and in new developments in the northern suburbs, particularly the neighbourhood of West Royalty, which is a key road junction.

In 1995 Charlottetown underwent municipal amalgamation. The present city was created by merging Charlottetown with Sherwood, Parkdale, Winsloe, West Royalty, and East Royalty. Since amalgamation, the city occupies most of Queens Royalty and part of the townships Lot 33 and Lot 34.

The central business district continues to undergo incremental expansion as government and private sector office space is constructed and new institutional space is built or retrofitted, however retail space in the CBD has suffered as a result of outlying big box retail construction in recent years.

== See also ==
- History of Prince Edward Island
- List of historic places in Charlottetown
