= 1780 in Canada =

- Decades: 1760s; 1770s; 1780s; 1790s; 1800s
- See also: History of Canada; Timeline of Canadian history; List of years in Canada

Events from the year 1780 in Canada.

== Incumbents ==
- Monarch: George III

=== Governors ===
- Governor of the Province of Quebec: Frederick Haldimand
- Governor of Nova Scotia: Lord William Campbell
- Commodore-Governor of Newfoundland: John Byron
- Governor of St. John's Island: Walter Patterson

== Events ==
- May 19 – an unusual darkening of the day sky was observed over the New England states and parts of Canada. This has never been explained, though clouds of smoke from massive forest fires are the most likely cause.
- Quakers begin the Underground Railroad to smuggle slaves to freedom in Canada.

== Births ==
- August 15 – Marie-Anne Gaboury, female explorer (d.1875)
- September 17 – Norman McLeod, Presbyterian minister (d.1866)
- November 16 – James FitzGibbon, British colonel who served in Canada for 45 years (d.1863)
- December 1 – Edward Bowen, lawyer, judge and politician (d.1866)

== Deaths ==
- November 28 – Esther Wheelwright, mother superior for Quebec Ursulines
