= Land question (disambiguation) =

Land question is the changing of laws, regulations, or customs regarding land ownership.

It may also refer to:

- Land Acts (Ireland)
- Land Question (Prince Edward Island)
