= 1779 in Canada =

- Decades: 1750s; 1760s; 1770s; 1780s; 1790s
- See also: History of Canada; Timeline of Canadian history; List of years in Canada

Events from the year 1779 in Canada.

== Incumbents ==
- Monarch: George III

=== Governors ===
- Governor of the Province of Quebec: Frederick Haldimand
- Governor of Nova Scotia: Sir Richard Hughes, 2nd Baronet
- Commodore-Governor of Newfoundland: Richard Edwards
- Governor of St. John's Island: Walter Patterson

== Deaths ==
- February 14 – James Cook killed by Hawaiian natives, cutting short his search for Northwest Passage. (born 1728)
