= 1783 in Canada =

- Decades: 1760s; 1770s; 1780s; 1790s; 1800s
- See also: History of Canada; Timeline of Canadian history; List of years in Canada

Events from the year 1783 in Canada.

== Incumbents ==
Monarch	George III of the United Kingdom
Governor General of British North America	Frederick Haldimand
Commodore-Governor of Newfoundland	John Campbell
Governor of Nova Scotia	John Parr then Edmund Fanning
Governor of Prince Edward Island	Walter Patterson
Commander-in-Chief, North America	Guy Carleton, 1st Baron Dorchester then John Campbell, of Strachur
Bishop of Quebec	Jean-Olivier Briand

== Events ==
- January 20 – Preliminaries of peace are signed between Great Britain and the United States.
- September 3 – American independence is formally recognized at the Treaty of Paris.
  - Treaty of Paris gives Americans fishing rights off Newfoundland.
  - The success of the rebellious 13 American colonies leaves the British with the poorest remnants of their New World empire and the determination to prevent a second revolution. However, they have to accommodate the roughly 50,000 refugees from the American Revolution who settle in Nova Scotia and the upper St. Lawrence. These United Empire Loyalists soon begin to agitate for the political and property rights they had previously enjoyed in the thirteen colonies.
  - British North America consists of the colonies and territories of the British Empire in continental North America after the end of the American Revolutionary War and the recognition of American independence.
- More than 5,000 Black People leave the United States to live in the Maritimes, Quebec and Ontario. Having sided with the British during the American War of Independence, they come to Canada as United Empire Loyalists, some as free men and some as slaves. Although promised land by the British, they receive only varying amounts of poor-quality land, and, in fact, some receive none at all.
- In Annapolis Royal, Nova Scotia, Rose Fortune becomes Canada's first policewoman.
- The border between Canada and the U.S. is accepted from the Atlantic Ocean to Lake of the Woods.
- In the area around the mouth of the Saint John River, those who fled the thirteen American colonies by 1783 are called United Empire Loyalists. Those who arrived after 1783 were called Late Loyalists.
- Pennsylvania Germans begin moving into southwestern Ontario.
- The North West Company is formed.
- Vermont delays entering the Union, because Congress is partial to New York, and because of the General Government's indebtedness, for which Vermont is not bound.

== Births ==
- April 26 – Peter Boyle de Blaquière, political figure and first chancellor of the University of Toronto (d.1860)

== See also ==
- 1782 in Canada
