= 1777 in Canada =

- Decades: 1750s; 1760s; 1770s; 1780s; 1790s
- See also: History of Canada; Timeline of Canadian history; List of years in Canada

Events from the year 1777 in Canada.

== Incumbents ==
- Monarch: George III

=== Governors ===
- Governor of the province of Quebec: Guy Carleton
- Governor of Nova Scotia: Mariot Arbuthnot
- Commodore-Governor of Newfoundland: John Montagu
- Governor of St. John's Island: Walter Patterson

== Events ==
- July 4 – Near Fort Ticonderoga, General Burgoyne offers condonement if colonists lay down their arms.
- September 19 – General Burgoyne's Indian and French allies desert at the battle of Stillwater.
- October 16 – Articles of Capitulation of 5,782 British, under Burgoyne are written.
- October 17 – Though aware of approaching relief, Burgoyne, having promised to capitulate, and fearing annihilation by a threatened attack, signs the capitulation. During its first session the Canadian Council passes sixteen ordinances, adopts English Commercial law, and constitutes itself a Court of Appeal, with final resort to the Privy Council in England.

=== Full date unknown ===
- In the House of Lords, Lord Camden declares: "If I were an American, I should resist to the last such manifest exertions of tyranny, violence and injustice."
- David Thompson enters Grey Coat School

== Births ==
- June 20 – Jean-Jacques Lartigue, bishop of Montreal (d.1840)
