= 1781 in Canada =

- Decades: 1760s; 1770s; 1780s; 1790s; 1800s
- See also: History of Canada; Timeline of Canadian history; List of years in Canada

Events from the year 1781 in Canada.

== Incumbents ==
- Monarch: George III

=== Governors ===
- Governor of the Province of Quebec: Frederick Haldimand
- Governor of Nova Scotia:
- Commodore-Governor of Newfoundland: John Byron
- Governor of St. John's Island: Walter Patterson

== Events ==
- February 2 – Ethan Allen receives a further proposal from Col. Robinson; but sends both to Congress, with a request for the recognition of Vermont. Premising loyalty to Congress, he maintains that Vermont may properly treat with Great Britain, to prevent being subjected to another State, by the authority of a Government which Vermonters have helped to establish.
- April – Ira Allen is sent to Canada to arrange an exchange of prisoners.
- May 1 – Receiving proposals for Vermont's independence, Col. Ira Allen temporizes to prevent invasion and enable the farmers to sow seed for another crop.
- August 20 – As a condition of Vermont's admission to the Union, Congress fixes boundaries which offend both Vermont and New York.
- George Washington asks Governor Chittenden whether Vermont chooses to be a Province or in the Union.
- September – British proposals to Vermont include a Legislature of two branches.
- October 19 – Vermont declines Congress' terms.
- November 14 – Governor Chittenden answers General Washington that, notwithstanding Vermont's interest in the common cause, the people would rather join British Canadians than be subject to New York.
- December 18 – Troops sent from New York, to coerce New Hampshire grantees, learn that they will defend their rights.
- American independence is assured by the British surrender at Yorktown. Gen. George Washington leads the Colonial army against the British.
- By the Articles of Confederation, Congress controls the western lands.
