= 1782 in Canada =

- Decades: 1760s; 1770s; 1780s; 1790s; 1800s
- See also: History of Canada; Timeline of Canadian history; List of years in Canada

Events from the year 1782 in Canada.

== Incumbents ==
- Monarch: George III

=== Governors ===
- Governor of the Province of Quebec: Frederick Haldimand
- Governor of Nova Scotia:
- Commodore-Governor of Newfoundland: John Byron
- Governor of St. John's Island: Walter Patterson

== Events ==
- 1782–83: A smallpox epidemic hits the Sanpoil of Washington.
- Montreal Upper Yellowstone, on old Indian trail along east slope of the mountains, challenging Spanish trade goods.
- January 1 – Threatened by three hostile forces, Vermont is advised by Gen. George Washington, a skilled surveyor, to limit jurisdiction to undisputed territory.
- February 22 – Vermont accepts the prescribed delimitation.
- March 1 – It is proposed, in Congress, to treat Vermont as hostile, failing submission to the terms of 20 August 1781, and to divide it between New York and New Hampshire, along the ridge of the Green Mountains; and that the Commander-in-chief employ the Congressional forces to further this resolution.
- In the course of this year John Molson, the future pioneer of Canadian steam navigation, arrives in Canada.
- Councillor Finlay proposes to establish English schools in Canadian parishes, and to prohibit using the French language in the Law Courts after a certain time.

== Births ==
- March 31: Jesse Ketchum, tanner, politician, and philanthropist (d.1867)

== Deaths ==
- April 11: Jean-Baptiste de La Brosse, Jesuit, priest, missionary, and professor (b.1724)
- May 21: Robert Monckton, army officer and colonial administrator (b. 1726)

=== Full date unknown ===
- Matonabbee, leading Indian (b.1737)
