= 1775 in Canada =

- Decades: 1750s; 1760s; 1770s; 1780s; 1790s
- See also: History of Canada; Timeline of Canadian history; List of years in Canada

Events from the year 1775 in Canada.

== Incumbents ==
- Monarch: George III

=== Governors ===
- Governor of the Province of Quebec: Guy Carleton
- Governor of Nova Scotia: Francis Legge
- Commodore-Governor of Newfoundland: Robert Duff
- Governor of St. John's Island: Walter Patterson

== Events ==
- April 19 – The American War of Independence begins, at Concord and Lexington, Massachusetts.
- May 1 – A bust of George III is found, in Montreal, adorned with beads, cross, and mitre, with the words "Pope of Canada: Sot of England." A reward of 500 guineas does not lead to apprehension of the culprit.
- May 10 – Ethan Allen takes Fort Ticonderoga.
- June 9 – Martial law is proclaimed in Canada.
- August 21 – Generals Schuyler and Richard Montgomery, with 1,000 American Patriots come to Canada, and invite the inhabitants to rebel.
- September 17 – Montgomery besieges Fort St. Johns.
- September 25 – Attempting to take Montreal, Ethan Allen and many of his 150 followers are captured, at Longue Pointe, and are sent to England.
- October 18 – American Patriots capture Chambly.
- October 25 – On Benedict Arnold's expedition to Quebec from New England, his force begins crossing the height of land between Maine and Canada for the descent to the St. Lawrence River.
- November 3 – Hindered by Colonel Warner, of Vermont, Governor Guy Carleton cannot relieve St. Johns, which surrenders to Montgomery.
- November 12 – General Montgomery tells Montrealers that, being defenceless, they cannot stipulate terms; but promises to respect personal rights. He demands the keys of public stores, and appoints 9 a.m. tomorrow for the army's entrance, by the Recollet gate. (see "Nov 12, 1775 Articles of Capitulation")
- November 13 – The invaders appropriate royal stores.
- December 31 – At the Battle of Quebec, British forces repulsed an attack by the Continental Army to capture Quebec City and enlist French Canadian support.
- Having captured Montreal, American Patriot troops fail to take Quebec City or elicit local support, and withdraw within a year.

== Births ==
- April 13 or 16 – Charles James Stewart, clergyman of the Church of England, bishop, and politician (d.1837)
- April 25 – William Warren Baldwin, doctor, militia officer, jp, lawyer, office holder, judge, businessman, and politician (d.1844)
- May 24 – Matthew Whitworth-Aylmer, 5th Baron Aylmer, army officer and colonial administrator (d.1850)
- September 13 – Laura Secord, heroine of the War of 1812 (d.1868)
- November 28 – Jean-Charles Létourneau, politician (d.1838)

== Deaths ==
- January 3: Robert Campbell, merchant and political figure in Nova Scotia. (b.1718)
- November 3: Juan José Pérez Hernández, naval officer and explorer (b. ca. 1725)
