= 1776 in Canada =

- Decades: 1750s; 1760s; 1770s; 1780s; 1790s
- See also: History of Canada; Timeline of Canadian history; List of years in Canada

Events from the year 1776 in Canada.

== Incumbents ==
- Monarch: George III

=== Governors ===
- Governor of the Province of Quebec: Guy Carleton
- Governor of Nova Scotia: Mariot Arbuthnot
- Commodore-Governor of Newfoundland: John Montagu
- Governor of St. John's Island: Walter Patterson

== Events ==
- American Revolutionary War. United Empire Loyalists move to Upper Canada and settle (lumbering, farming starts).
- April 29 – Benjamin Franklin, Samuel Chase and Rev. John Carroll, a Jesuit, urge Canadians to send delegates to Congress, promising toleration. Franklin brings a printer and press, for a newspaper, to mould public opinion. Canadians regard Franklin as an enemy, and the priests remind Father Carroll that, unlike some of the Provinces, Britain tolerates the Romish Church.
- May 6 – As a British fleet is in sight, the Continental Army, before Quebec, weakened by disease, retires from a superior enemy, who await reinforcements, behind strong walls.
- June 8 – Attempting to surprise Three Rivers, General Thompson, with 200 of 1,800 Americans, is taken prisoner.
- June 16 – Arnold's force has retreated from Montreal.
- June 18 – General Burgoyne finds that the Continental Army has evacuated St. Johns.
- The eleventh Article of "Confederation and Perpetual Union" provides that: "Canada, according to this Confederation, and joining in the measures of the United States, shall be admitted into, and entitled to, all the advantages of this Union; but no other Colony shall be admitted to the same, unless such admission be agreed to by nine States."
- October 11 – The British are victorious on Lake Champlain.
- October 13 – On Lake Champlain, Arnold runs part of his fleet ashore, to avoid capture.
- The Jesuits' College, at Quebec, converted into barracks.
- The American colonies declare their independence. The United States Declaration of Independence is signed July 4, 1776.
- Common Sense by Thomas Paine (1737–1809) appears.
- Under Guy Carleton, Quebec withstands an American siege until the appearance of a British fleet (May 6). Carleton is later knighted.

== Births ==
- January 23 – Howard Douglas, soldier, educator, author, inventor, and colonial administrator (d.1861)
- February 21 – Joseph Barss, privateer (d.1824)
- April 3 – François Blanchet, author, physician, teacher, militia officer, businessman, seigneur, politician, office holder (d.1830)
- May 20 – Simon Fraser, fur-trader and explorer (d.1862)
- July 17 – John Neilson, publisher, printer, bookseller, politician, farmer, and militia officer (d.1848)
- August 1 – Archibald Acheson, 2nd Earl of Gosford, colonial administrator (d.1849)
- August 5 – John Willson, judge and political figure (d.1860)

=== Full date unknown ===
- Colin Campbell, army officer and colonial administrator (d.1847)

== Deaths ==
- March 30 – Jonathan Belcher, lawyer, chief justice, and lieutenant governor of Nova Scotia (b.1710)
