= 1778 in Canada =

- Decades: 1750s; 1760s; 1770s; 1780s; 1790s
- See also: History of Canada; Timeline of Canadian history; List of years in Canada

Events from the year 1778 in Canada.

== Incumbents ==
- Monarch: George III

=== Governors ===
- Governor of the Province of Quebec: Guy Carleton then Frederick Haldimand
- Governor of Nova Scotia: Lord William Campbell
- Commodore-Governor of Newfoundland: John Byron
- Governor of St. John's Island: Walter Patterson

== Events ==
- February 6 – The United States allies with France, and joins the American Revolutionary War.
- March 29 – April 26 British Captain James Cook explores Alaskan coast, seeking Northwest Passage back to the Atlantic. On the last of three voyages to the west coast, he travels as far north as the Bering Strait and claims Nootka Sound, Vancouver Island for the British. While there, he trades for sea otter pelts. On the way back to England his crew almost mutinied, desperately wanting to go back to the Pacific Northwest, after stopping in China and discovering how much sea otter pelts were worth.
- The English overrun the southern states, but are weakened by a French blockade of shipping.
- After landing at Nootka Sound in August, former British naval captain John Meares arrives from Macao (sailing under the Portuguese flag) with 70 Chinese carpenters. He supervises the building of another ship and housing at Nootka Sound as the post becomes the centre of the pelt and fur trades in the Pacific Northwest.
- The original form of hockey is explained to pelters by the indigenous and soon after leads to the form of hockey seen today.
- Spinning mule invented to spin multiple strands of yarn.
- First treaty between the United States and an Indian nation is negotiated with the Delaware; they are offered the prospect of statehood
- British and Iroquois forces attack and massacre American settlers in western New York and Pennsylvania.

== Births ==
- April 12 – John Strachan, first Anglican Bishop of Toronto, Born in Aberdeen, Scotland (d.1867)

=== Full date unknown ===
- David Willson, religious leader and mystic (d.1866)
