= 1784 in Canada =

- Decades: 1760s; 1770s; 1780s; 1790s; 1800s
- See also: History of Canada; Timeline of Canadian history; List of years in Canada

Events from the year 1784 in Canada.

== Incumbents ==
- Monarch – George III

=== Governors ===
- Governor of the Province of Quebec – Frederick Haldimand
- Governor of Nova Scotia – John Parr
- Commodore-Governor of Newfoundland – John Byron
- Governor of St. John's Island – Walter Patterson

== Events ==
- August 16 – In response to Loyalist demands, the Crown creates New Brunswick out of Nova Scotia. New Brunswick was then divided into eight counties.
- North West Company built up Grand portage as a general summer rendezvous for all companies and free traders, drawing furs from as far as Oregon and the Arctic Circle.
- David Thompson began his apprenticeship on Hudson Bay.
- James Cook's journal of his last voyage published in London.
- Ward Chipman the Elder, a Massachusetts lawyer, settled in New Brunswick, where he served as solicitor general until 1808.
- Butler's Rangers were disbanded in June 1784, and its veterans were given land grants in the Nassau District, now the Niagara region of Ontario, as a reward for their services to the British Crown.

== Births ==
- June 21 – Sir George Arthur, 1st Baronet, army officer and colonial administrator (d.1854)
- October 19 – John McLoughlin, physician, fur trader, and merchant (d.1857)

== Deaths ==
- January 28 – Henry Allen, evangelist, hymnist, and theologian (b.1748)
- December 13 – Dr. Samuel Johnson dies in London. (b.1709)

=== Full date unknown ===
- Laurence Coughlan, Methodist preacher, Church of England clergyman, and local official
