= 1785 in Canada =

- Decades: 1760s; 1770s; 1780s; 1790s; 1800s
- See also: History of Canada; Timeline of Canadian history; List of years in Canada

Events from the year 1785 in Canada.

== Incumbents ==
- Monarch: George III

=== Governors ===
- Governor of the Province of Quebec: Frederick Haldimand
- Governor of Nova Scotia: Edmund Fanning
- Commodore-Governor of Newfoundland: John Byron
- Governor of St. John's Island: Walter Patterson

== Events ==
- North West Company strengthened far west trade through such forts as Athabasca and English River.
- May 18: The city of Saint John, New Brunswick is incorporated.
- Fredericton opens a Provincial Academy of Arts and Sciences, the germ of the University of New Brunswick (1859).
- New Brunswick is separated from Nova Scotia
- Du Calvet proposes Canadian representation in the British Parliament, three members, each, for the Districts of Quebec and Montreal.
- To a proposed Elective Legislature, it is objected that French Canadians do not wish to change their customary laws, and that there are not enough fit men to compose a Legislature.
- Isaac Brock takes command of the 49th Foot, which would be the backbone of the British Empire forces in Canada during the War of 1812.
- Mohawk Chapel, the oldest church in Ontario, was constructed near Brantford, Ontario.

== Births ==
- January 4: Louis-Théodore Besserer, notary, soldier, politician, and businessman (d.1861)
- January 30: Charles Metcalfe, 1st Baron Metcalfe, colonial administrator (d.1846)
- February 4: Frédéric-Auguste Quesnel, politician, lawyer, and businessman (d.1866)
- February 15: William Crane, merchant, justice of the peace, judge, and politician (d.1853)
- April 27: Amable Éno, dit Deschamps, political figure (d.1875)
- September 17: Jacob De Witt, businessman, politician, and justice of the peace (d.1859)
- November 25: Andrew Stuart, lawyer, politician, office holder, and author (d.1840)
- December 14: Michel-Louis Juchereau Duchesnay, army and militia officer, seigneur, jp, and office holder (d.1838)

=== Full date unknown ===
- William Abrams, businessman, jp, judge, office holder, and militia officer (d.1844)
- François Lesieur Desaulniers, farmer and political figure (d.1870)
- John Heckman, political figure (d.1871)
- Caleb Hopkins, farmer and politician (d.1880)
- Peter Robinson, politician, Peterborough, Ontario renamed in his honour (d.1838)
