= Tenant League =

19th century movement in Prince Edward Island

The Tenant League in Prince Edward Island was a 19th-century agrarian populist movement whose goal was the "dismantling of the proprietary land system" in that province.

== Context ==
The League was formed in response to the Absentee Landlord Question, which arose in 1767 when King George III divided the island into 67 lots, which he allocated to his supporters by lottery. Many tenant farmers in the province were unhappy with their inability to gain title in the land they worked. Most also faced burdensome rents.

The grants were conditional on certain settlement conditions which were often not fulfilled. However, the political connection of the grantees generally meant that the government could not or would not contest them, in spite of calls from the province's tenants.

== Activity ==
The league was created in December 1864. By the summer of 1865, most of the Island's tenants were members. In a convention at Charlottetown, the league adopted a constitution which urged its members to withhold payment of rents.

At a parade in 1865 the government attempted to arrest Samuel Fletcher, the league's leader. However, the crowd of members prevented it. Governor George Dundas then banned the organization, but they refused to disband. Defiance and collective action would continue to characterize the league's existence, as they clashed with officials dispatched to collect rents. This prompted the introduction of British troops to put down the "Tenant League Riots" in 1866.

== Influence ==
In 1873, after a failed railroad project pushed the Island almost to bankruptcy, it joined the Dominion of Canada. Under the terms of union, the government of Canada provided financial help to the province in purchasing the remaining leaseholds. In 1878 PEI passed its compulsory Land Purchase Act which finally dispossessed the absentee landlords and made the land available for purchase in fee simple to the local population.
