= No. 31 GRS BCATP =

No. 31 General Reconnaissance School
- Country: United Kingdom
- Branch: Royal Air Force
- Role: General Reconnaissance (Ocean Patrol) Training
- Part of: No. 3 Training Command

No. 31 General Reconnaissance School was a Royal Air Force Second World War flight training school located at RCAF Station Charlottetown, PEI. The school trained pilots and observers in the techniques of patrolling oceans using the Avro Anson. The British school became part of the British Commonwealth Air Training Plan in 1942.

== See also ==
- Article XV squadrons
- RCAF Eastern Air Command
- List of British Commonwealth Air Training Plan facilities in Canada
