= 1840 in Canada =

- Decades: 1820s; 1830s; 1840s; 1850s; 1860s
- See also: History of Canada; Timeline of Canadian history; List of years in Canada

Events from the year 1840 in Canada.

== Incumbents ==
- Monarch: Victoria

=== Federal government ===
- Parliament of Lower Canada: 15th

=== Governors ===
- Governor of the Canadas: Robert Milnes
- Governor of New Brunswick: George Stracey Smyth
- Governor of Nova Scotia: John Coape Sherbrooke
- Commodore-Governor of Newfoundland: Richard Goodwin Keats
- Governor of Prince Edward Island: Charles Douglass Smith

== Events ==
- May 6 — Postage stamps come into use.
- June 10 — Queen Victoria and Prince Albert are shot at.
- June 28 — Queen Victoria is crowned.
- July 23 — Act of Union. The Queen sanctions the union of Upper and Lower Canada. The United Canada Act allows larger government to borrow more money.

== Births ==
- January 1 — John Christian Schultz, politician and Lieutenant-Governor of Manitoba (died 1896)
- March 24 — Laurent-Olivier David, journalist, lawyer, and politician (died 1926)
- September 26 — Louis-Olivier Taillon, politician and Premier of Quebec (died 1923)

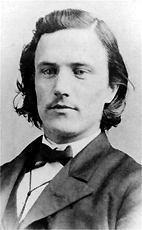
Joseph-Adolphe Chapleau

- October 15 — Honoré Mercier, lawyer, journalist, politician and Premier of Quebec (died 1894)
- November 6 — James Fisher, politician (died 1927)
- November 9 — Joseph-Adolphe Chapleau, lawyer, politician and 5th Premier of Quebec (died 1898)

=== Full date unknown ===
- Patrick J. Whelan, tailor and alleged Fenian sympathizer executed following the 1868 assassination of Canadian journalist and politician Thomas D'Arcy McGee (died 1869)

== Deaths ==
- February 21 — Andrew Stuart, lawyer, politician, office holder, and author (born 1785)
- April 19 — Jean-Jacques Lartigue, bishop of Montreal (born 1777)
