= HMS Hind (1749) =

Sixth-rate frigate of the Royal Navy from 1749

History

Great Britain
- Name: HMS Hind
- Ordered: 26 September 1747
- Builder: Chitty & Vernon, Chichester
- Laid down: October 1747
- Launched: 29 November 1749
- Completed: 25 December 1749 to 20 August 1752 at Portsmouth Dockyard
- Commissioned: July 1752
- Decommissioned: November 1783
- Fate: Sold 8 January 1784

General characteristics
- Class & type: Sixth-rate frigate
- Tons burthen: 510 34/94 (bm)
- Length: 112 ft 10 in (34.39 m) (gundeck); 91 ft 10.75 in (28.0099 m) (keel)
- Beam: 32 ft 3.75 in (9.8489 m)
- Depth of hold: 11 ft 0 in (3.35 m)
- Sail plan: Full-rigged ship
- Complement: 160 officers and men
- Armament: Lower deck: 2 × 9-pounder guns (aft); Upper deck: 20 × 9-pounder guns; Quarterdeck: 2 × 3-pounder guns; 12 × swivel guns

HMS Hind was a 24-gun sixth-rate frigate of the Royal Navy, later sold on to be renamed the Earl of Chatham and used as a whaling ship.

== North American operations ==
The Hind, under command of Captain Robert Bond, saw service on the North American Station during the Seven Years' War when she was part of a fleet that assembled in early 1758 at Portsmouth, England, under command of Admiral Edward Boscawen for the expedition against Louisbourg, Nova Scotia.

On 19 February, this fleet set sail for Halifax, Nova Scotia, arriving on 9 May. On 28 May, the fleet sailed from Halifax and arrived in sight of Louisbourg on 1 June. Throughout the siege of Louisbourg, the fleet actively supported the British Army and the fortress finally surrendered on 26 July.

In late August 1758 the frigate was part of a small fleet that transported 500 soldiers from Louisbourg to Port-la-Joye on nearby Île Saint-Jean, which was also surrendered by the French commander of Louisbourg. At Port-la-Joye, British forces under Lord Rollo undertook to deport Acadian settlers from the island, as well as Acadians from Nova Scotia who had sought refuge there from the Bay of Fundy Campaign three years earlier. The Hind returned to Great Britain that autumn.

In February 1759, the frigate sailed from Spithead as part of the fleet destined for the expedition against Québec under command of Vice-Admiral Charles Saunders. The voyage was long and tedious. On 21 April, when the fleet finally reached Louisbourg, it was to find the harbour blocked with ice, so that the fleet made for Halifax instead. The fleet finally sailed for Louisbourg in May. Between 1 and 6 June, the fleet gradually left the harbour of Louisbourg and sailed for Québec.

On 23 June, Saunders' fleet made a junction with a squadron led by Commodore Philip Durell at Île-aux-Coudres. On 26 June, the whole British fleet of Vice-Admiral Saunders was anchored safely off the southern shore of Île d'Orléans, a few kilometres below Québec without losing a single ship. Québec was surrendered by French forces on 18 September following the Battle of the Plains of Abraham which began on 13 September.

At the end of October 1759, Vice-Admiral Saunders fired his farewell salute and departed the St. Lawrence River with his fleet to return to Great Britain. Saunders left Captain Lord Colville in command of a small squadron, including several frigates (possibly including Hind), in North America.

== Post-war ==
From 1763 to 1766 her commanding officer was Captain William McCleverty. She was shown to have arrived in Cork from Carrickfergus on 21 April 1764. Captain McCleverty was again her commanding officer from 1771 to 1773.

The Hind converted to a 10-gun armed transport at Sheerness from September 1782 until January 1783. She was finally paid off in November 1783 and sold on 8 January 1784.

Converted to a whaling ship and renamed Earl of Chatham, she completed four Arctic whaling seasons before being wrecked in the Bay of Lopness off Sanday, Orkney on 29 April 1788, although all 56 people on board survived. Timbers from the wreck were first discovered by villagers from Sanday in 2024, when uncovered by shifting sands. Research by Wessex Archaeology and Dendrochronicle, commissioned by Historic Environment Scotland, finally established the most likely identity of the wreck in 2025. The rescued timbers from the wreck are now preserved in a purpose-built fresh-water tank at the Sanday Heritage Centre.
