= Rocky Point, Prince Edward Island =

Coordinates: 46.203852°N 63.151574°W

Location of Rocky Point in Prince Edward Island

Rocky Point is a settlement in Prince Edward Island, Canada. It is part of Lot 65 in Hillsboro Parish. Rocky Point had been the location of an annual Mi'kmaq summer coastal community before European settlement.

Port-la-Joye–Fort Amherst, a National Historic Site, is located within the settlement.
