= Land Question (Prince Edward Island) =

Question of land ownership on Prince Edward Island

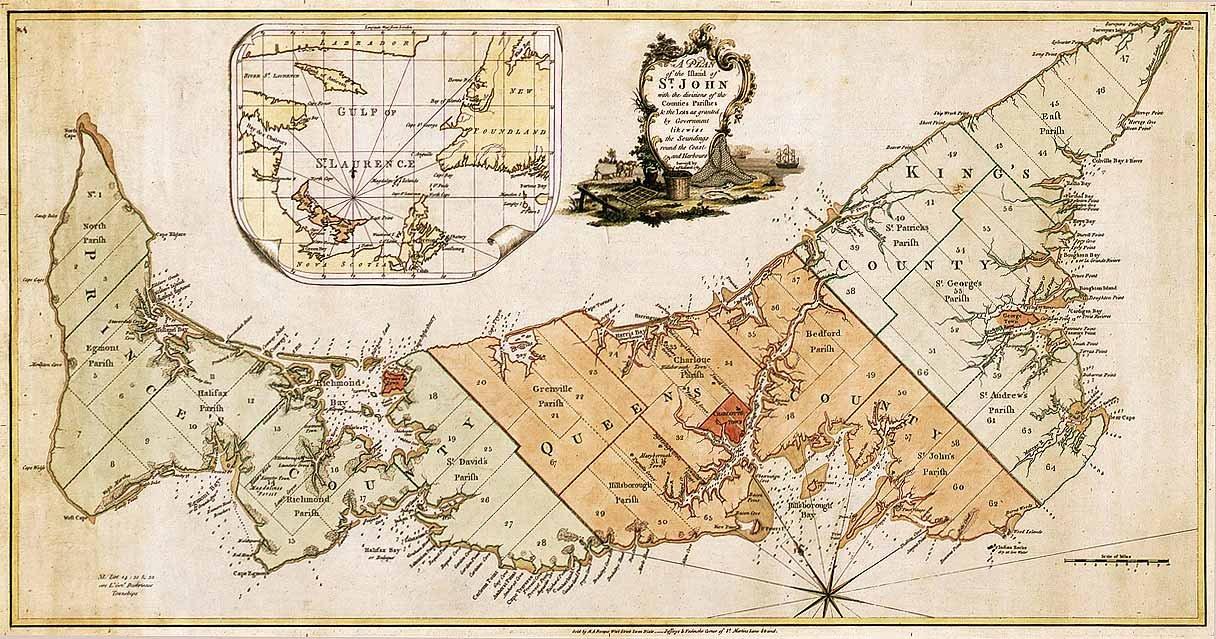
Map of Prince Edward Island in 1775. Titled: "A plan of the island of St. John with the divisions of the counties parishes & the lots as granted by government likewise the soundings round the coast and harbours. Surveyed by Capt. Holland. 1775."

The Land Question was a major issue in the history of Prince Edward Island, now part of Canada. It was about who should own the land on the island. The land was divided into lots by the British government in 1767 and given to private landowners called proprietors. These proprietors wanted to rent the land to settlers, known as tenants, but the tenants wanted to own the land themselves through freehold ownership.

The plan worked poorly. There were not enough tenants, so the proprietors did not make much money from rent. Because of this, many of them could not pay the government their required land tax, called a quitrent. In 1781, the island's government tried to take back the land from proprietors who were not paying, but the Colonial Office in Britain stepped in and stopped it in 1783. The governor who led this plan, Walter Patterson, was removed from office in 1786.

In 1797, a political movement called the Escheat Movement began. Its goal was to convince the British Crown to take back land from the proprietors and sell it to the tenants. In 1803, supporters of this idea were elected to the General Assembly of Prince Edward Island, but the British government blocked their plans. Over the next few decades, the Assembly kept trying to buy land from the proprietors for the tenants, but these efforts kept failing.

From 1864 to 1865, tenants attempted a civil disobedience campaign, but it did not succeed. Eventually, many proprietors gave up and sold their land piece by piece to the local government, which then sold it to the people living on it. Finally, in 1873, Prince Edward Island joined the Canadian Confederation—but only if the landlord system was ended. This agreement solved the Land Question once and for all.

== Background ==
In 1763, the Treaty of Paris resulted in the transfer of Prince Edward Island from France to the United Kingdom. In 1767, a system of land ownership was established in which the island was divided into 67 lots of about 20,000 acres (81 km^{2}) each, with settlers living on parcels of the land rented out by the proprietors, the owners of the lots of land. Ownership of the lots of land was determined by a lottery held in London, the winners of which were mostly political, business, and military figures with connections to those in the British government. In 1769, under pressure from the proprietors, who worried that a Nova Scotia legislature would force them to give up their property rights, the British government granted autonomy to Prince Edward Island.

== Initial conflict ==
Almost immediately after the establishment of the new system, conflict arose. The American Revolutionary War drove potential settlers away from Prince Edward Island. That caused two problems. It made it difficult for proprietors to fulfill an obligation attached to their grants, to settle one person per 200 acres (81 ha) within ten years of the system's commencement. It also meant that the proprietors were not being paid much rent, as there were not many tenants to pay it. That meant that the proprietors were unable or at least not willing to pay the required quitrent to the Crown. Conflict also arose between the tenants and the proprietors. As the lottery for Prince Edward Island land was held in London, and most of the proprietors were important figures from the United Kingdom, most of the proprietors did not actually live in British North America. That meant that many neglected their obligations to the settlers.

In 1774, the government of Prince Edward Island passed the Quit Rent Act 1774 to force the proprietors to pay their dues to maintain civil infrastructure on the island. However, many proprietors continued to simply not pay their quitrent. In 1781, the government, led by Governor Walter Patterson, compulsorily acquired approximately half of the island using a process known as escheat. The same year, the government held a public auction to sell off the land that had been compulsorily acquired. However, following a concerted effort by the proprietors to get the Colonial Office to reverse the action, the Crown overturned the sales conducted at the auction in 1783. The proprietors requested for Governor Patterson to be removed from his office, and the Colonial Office did so in 1786.

== Escheat Movement ==
In 1797, the Escheat Movement was born. Under the scheme proposed by the movement, land would be forfeited to the Crown should proprietors default on their quitrents, and tenants would be given the option of either purchasing part of the forfeited land or leasing it from the Crown. Members of the movement won a large majority in the General Assembly of Prince Edward Island in 1802, and in 1803, a law to implement escheat was passed by the legislature. However, the government of the United Kingdom would not abandon its principle of supporting property rights and refused to grant the bill royal assent.

In 1832, a tax was placed on land owned by the proprietors. In exchange for collecting the tax, the government promised to abandon its attempts to enforce the payment of quitrents. In 1836, a bill was passed to place a penal tax on unoccupied land. Although the Colonial Office initially refused to recommend royal assent, comments by Lord Durham led the Privy Council to give royal assent to the bill in 1838. Despite the change in property arrangements in Prince Edward Island with the introduction of those taxes, tenants were still unable to take possession of their land. In 1830, Roman Catholics were given the vote, and in 1838, the Escheat Party won a large majority in the General Assembly. Another bill to implement escheat passed the lower house but was rejected by the Legislative Council. The leader of the Escheat Party, William Cooper, travelled to London to meet the Colonial Secretary, but he was turned away without a meeting. Instead, the Secretary advised the Lieutenant Governor of Prince Edward Island that the government would not recommend assent to any bill advocating escheat. The Escheat Movement disintegrated.

== Settlement (Sulivan and Stewart) ==
In 1851, the Liberals gained office on Prince Edward Island. They immediately went about putting in place measures to gradually dismantle the proprietor/tenant system although their efforts generally had limited effect largely because Samuel Cunard, who owned one sixth of the island, refused to sell any of his land. In 1864, the tenants organised the Tenant League and vowed to resist the collection of rent by their proprietors. Efforts by law enforcement to quell this rebellion had little effect and so the government of the island requested the assistance of British troops to enforce the collection of rent. In 1865, British troops arrived in the colony and successfully enforced the collection of the unpaid rent, and the Tenant League crumbled. It appeared that the operation of the Tenant League was a matter of principle, rather than practical necessity; the rent paid by tenants to the proprietors was to the amount of one shilling per acre, and the proprietors allowed rent to go unpaid for years at a time.

In the following years, many of the proprietors pulled out of the real estate market and voluntarily sold their property to the government so that sale to the land's occupiers could be facilitated. In 1873, Prince Edward Island joined the Canadian Confederation. One of the terms of joining the Confederation was the sale of the estates of land to their occupiers. The agreement to join the Confederation contained a clause outlining the possibility that the federal government of Canada could provide a grant of up to CA$800,000 to the provincial government to facilitate the purchase of the land from the proprietors. In 1875, the commissioners appointed under the Provisions of the Land Purchase Act, 1875, had all of the outstanding proprietor-owned land compulsorily purchased by the provincial government, at rates decided by a Commission of Enquiry.

The two largest landholders to be bought out by the Canadian government, in 1875, did not readily agree with their forced sale, facilitated by the articles of the Land Purchase Act (1875). On Monday, August 23, 1875, The Commission of Enquiry began its enquiry of the largest estate, an absentee landowner, Charlotte Antonia Sulivan, of some 66,937 acres. She was awarded $81,500 CAD 1875, at $1.22 per acre. Sulivan challenged the authority of the Commissioners in their proceedings against her, saw the award set aside on appeal to the Supreme Court of Prince Edward Island, and claimed $239,185 CA. In 1875, the Province, appealing, for The Commissioner of Public Lands, took her challenge to the Supreme Court of Canada. In the Court's first case, Kelly v Sulivan, sustained the forced sale and award.

On Friday, August 27, 1875, The ‘Commission of Enquiry’ enquired as to the estate of Robert Bruce Stewart, the largest resident proprietor on PEI, owning some 66,727 acres. Upon his father's death in 1852, Robert Bruce Stewart inherited, by title, Lots 7, 10, 12, and 30 as well as parts of Lots 27, 46, and 47. He having fought long and hard against the legislation enabling the Land Purchase Act 1875, against a claim of $240,905, the ‘Commission of Enquiry’ awarded him just $76,500 CAD 1875, the lowest per acre award, at $1.15 per acre.
