= Skmaqn–Port-la-Joye–Fort Amherst =

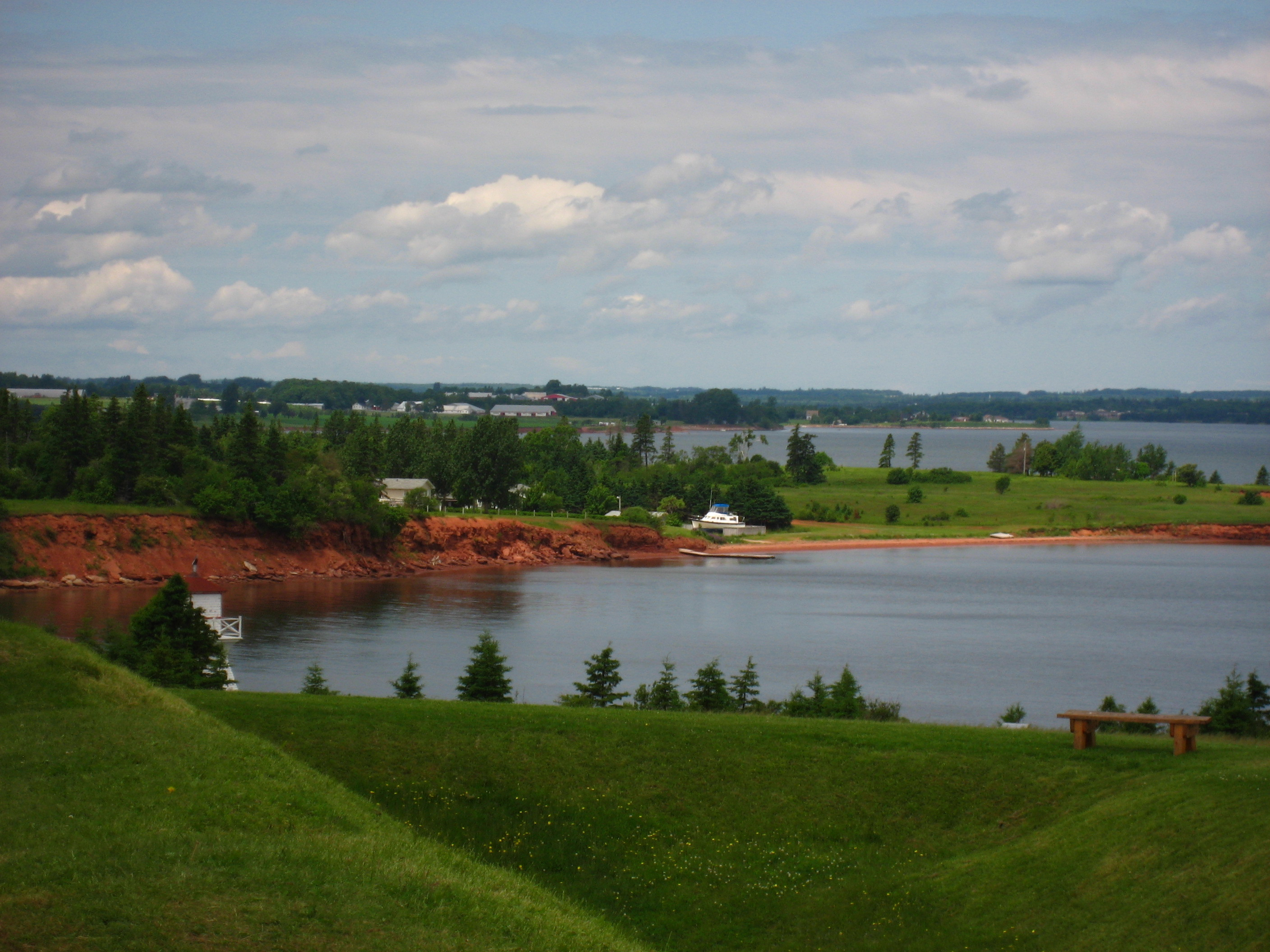
- Warren Cove in Charlottetown Harbour, as viewed from the earthworks of Fort Amherst.

- Location within Prince Edward Island
- 46°11′50″N 63°8′13″W
- Location: Anchor Point in Rocky Point, Prince Edward Island, Canada

History
- Built: 1720-1770

Site notes
- Area: 90.75 hectares (224.2 acres)
- Governing body: Parks Canada

Skmaqn–Port-la-Joye–Fort Amherst is a National Historic Site located in Rocky Point, Prince Edward Island.

This location has the double distinction of hosting one of the first Acadian settlements in present-day Prince Edward Island, as well as the first military fortification on the island while under control of France as well as the first military fortification on the island while under control of Britain.

From 1720 to 1770 Port-la-Joye, later named Fort Amherst, served as the seat of government and port of entry for settlers to the island while under both French and British control. As such, it played an important role as a colonial outpost in the French-British struggle for dominance in North America.

The site was designated a National Historic Site by Alvin Hamilton, the Minister of Northern Affairs and National Resources, on May 27, 1958, on the advice of the national Historic Sites and Monuments Board. The property was acquired by the federal government in 1959, and the present visitor center opened in 1973. The site's name was changed from Port-la-Joye—Fort Amherst NHS to Skmaqn—Port-la-Joye—Fort Amherst NHS on February 16, 2018. The additional Mi’kmaq word means “the waiting place”, and is thought to originate between 1725 and 1758, "when Mi’kmaq and French leaders met annually at the site to renew their relationship and military alliance."

== French settlement ==
The first European settlers in the area were French military personnel from Fortress Louisbourg who founded a settlement in 1720 named Port La-Joye on the southwestern part of the harbour opposite the present-day city of Charlottetown. This settlement effort was led by Michel Haché-Gallant, who used his sloop to transport Acadian settlers from Louisbourg on Île Royal.

Acadian settlers established farms in the surrounding area while under French control from 1720 to 1745 and 1746–1758 and the French military established a small military force at the outpost, garrisoned with troops from Louisbourg. Morale was low and troops were infrequently relieved due to its unpopularity. The wood barracks were poor protection from harsh winters when wind, rain and snow swirled between picket walls and rotten planked roofs.

== Battle at Port-la-Joye (1745) ==
The first Siege of Louisbourg by a British expeditionary force took place in May–June 1745 as part of King George's War. When the French commander of Louisbourg capitulated to the invasion force composed largely of New England irregulars, this also resulted in the de facto surrender of Île Saint-Jean (present-day Prince Edward Island).

Following the French surrender at Louisbourg, a force of New England troops landed that summer at Port-la-Joye. Under the command of Joseph de Pont Duvivier, the French garrison at that time comprised 20 soldiers. The French troops fled while the New Englanders burned the community to the ground. Duvivier and his soldiers retreated up the Northeast River (present-day Hillsborough River), pursued by the New Englanders until the French troops received reinforcements from local Acadian settlers and the Mi'kmaq. The French troops and their allies were able to drive the New Englanders back to their ships; in the process, nine New Englanders were killed, wounded or made prisoner while the New Englanders took six Acadians as hostages, who were threatened with execution should the Acadians or Mi'kmaq start a rebellion.

The New England troops returned to Louisbourg while Duvivier and his 20 troops left to seek refuge in Quebec. After the fall of Louisbourg, the resident French population of Île Royal (present-day Cape Breton Island) were deported to France while the Acadians of Île Saint-Jean lived under the threat of deportation for the remainder of the war.

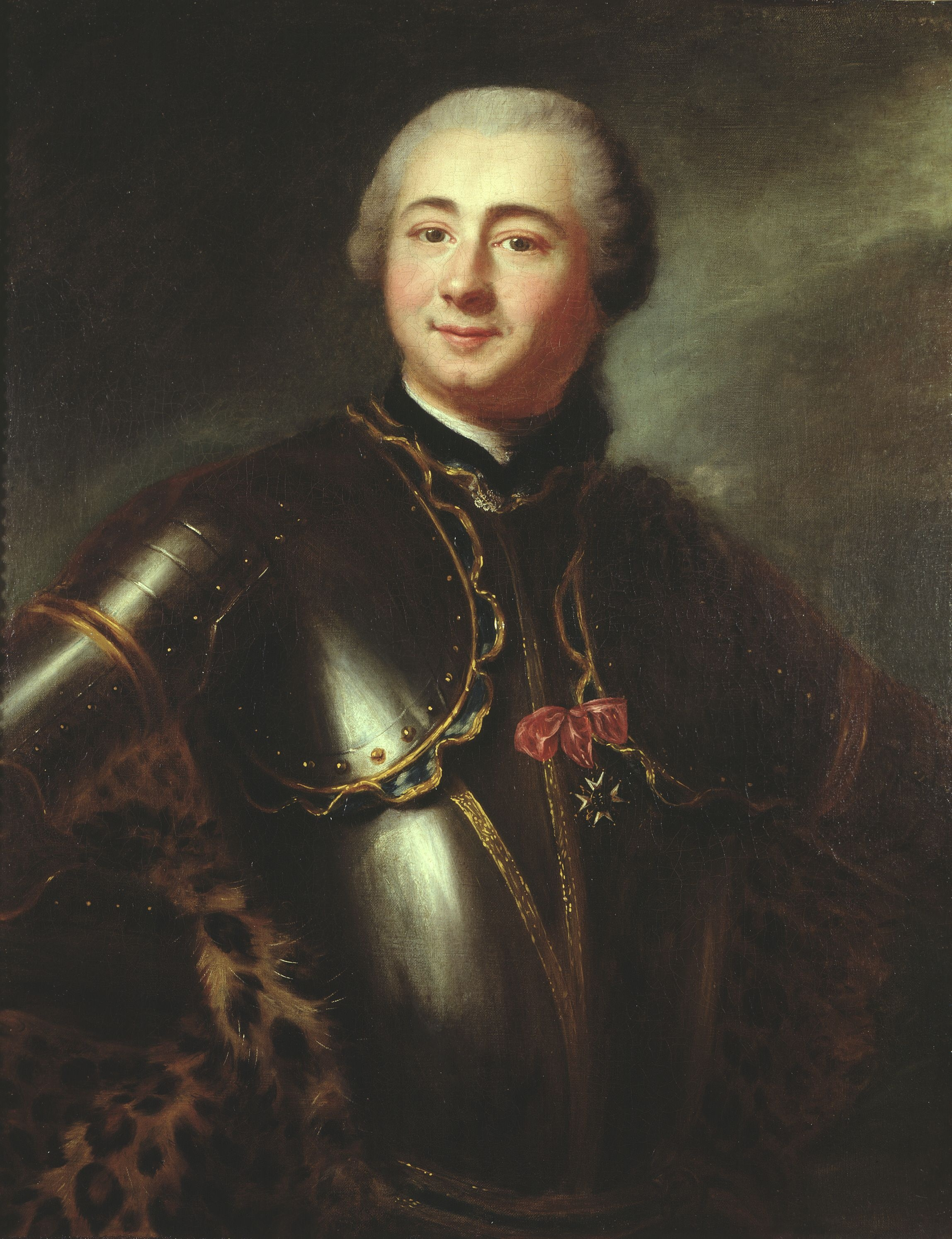
Charles Deschamps de Boishébert et de Raffetot

== Battle at Port-la-Joye (1746) ==
The British had left a garrison of 200 soldiers (New England irregulars and several British Army regulars) as well as two Royal Navy ships at Port-La-Joye to over-winter.

To regain control of Acadia for France, Jean-Baptiste Nicolas Roch de Ramezay was sent from Quebec to the region in 1746 to join forces with the Duc d'Anville Expedition. Upon arriving at Fort Beausejour on the Isthmus of Chignecto, he sent French officer Boishébert to Île Saint-Jean on a reconnaissance to assess the size of the British forces. After Boishebert returned, de Ramezay sent Joseph-Michel Legardeur de Croisille et de Montesson along with over 500 men, 200 of whom were Mi'kmaq, to Port-La-Joye.

The battle took place in July 1746 near the site of Port-la-Joye on the banks of the Northeast River (present-day Hillsborough River). Montesson and his troops killed or imprisoned 34 of the New England irregulars and Montesson was commended for having distinguished himself in his first independent command.

The fall of Port-la-Joye saw Île Saint-Jean return to control by France. French military forces constructed a star-shaped fort on the site between 1748 and 1749 in a style influenced by Sébastien Le Prestre de Vauban.

== Seven Years' War ==
The first three years of the Seven Years' War had relatively little impact on Île Saint-Jean; however, the deportation of Acadians from Nova Scotia as a result of the Bay of Fundy Campaign saw an influx of refugees to the colony in the late summer and fall of 1755. In July 1758 the final Siege of Louisbourg saw the French commander surrender to British forces; just as in 1745, this surrender of the colony of Île-Royale (present day Cape Breton Island) also saw the de facto surrender of the colony of Île Saint-Jean and with it its capital at Port-la-Joye. In late August a British squadron of four ships carrying 500 soldiers under command of Lord Rollo arrived at Port-la-Joye. Rollo, travelling aboard HMS Hind (1749), had been told to expect approximately 300-500 Acadians but was surprised to find roughly 3,000-5,000 instead. His men proceeded to round up approximately 3,000 Acadians for deportation back to France. Thirteen additional ships arrived by October and departed overseas, loaded with Acadian deportees; 700 deportees drowned due to their ships sinking en route to Europe and an estimated 900 died of disease in North America during the deportation. Approximately 1,600 Acadians evaded deportation by hiding in forests in the western part was renamed as St. John's Island.

After the British took control of Port-la-Joye, they replaced the rudimentary French fortification with a new stockade fort immediately to the east (toward the water). It was built under the supervision of William Spry, a British Army lieutenant who reported it to be complete on October 10, 1758. This fortification was named Fort Amherst in honour of General Jeffery Amherst. The small fort was home to 190 soldiers from the 28th Regiment of Foot, also known as "The Old Braggs" in honour of their Colonel, Lieutenant-General Philip Bragg. The stockade was surrounded by a dry ditch and was crossed by a drawbridge. The foundation of the 2.5 m (8.2 ft) pallisade was porous sandstone. There were 18 cannon placed at the fort with 4 mounted in each corner and one mid-way on two of the walls. Buildings inside the fort included the commanding officer's headquarters, officer's quarters, soldier barracks, bakehouse, forge, storehouse and a prison. The fort's soldiers were rotated each spring with fresh replacements from Louisbourg.

A mutiny took place among the garrison at Fort Amherst in 1762, resulting in courts-martial at Louisbourg for the main people involved; demotions and hundreds of lashes by cat o'nine tails and one execution. The Treaty of Paris in 1763 ended the Seven Years' War which saw the garrison reduced at Fort Amherst.

== British colonial period ==
On March 6, 1764 Samuel Holland was appointed Surveyor-General of North America. On March 23, he received instructions to survey all British possessions north of the Potomac River, which included St. John's Island (present day Prince Edward Island), the Magdalen Islands and Royal Island (present day Cape Breton Island), due to their importance for the fisheries. St. John's Island was Holland's first stop on this assignment and he noted that the island's population had decreased significantly following the deportation of the Acadians in 1758. His survey of the island proposed an immigration and resettlement scheme based on a semi-feudal system of land distribution with a feudal land tenure tied to fees. Holland arrived at Fort Amherst in summer 1764 with his family but realized the fortification was unsuitable for his use and chose instead to build a dwelling approximately 1.5 km (0.93 mi) south of the garrison at a location he named Observation Cove (present-day Holland Cove). From there, Holland, his deputy surveyor Thomas Wright, engineers, volunteers, and soldiers from Fort Amherst set out to complete the survey, enduring harsh conditions through the winter. The survey divided the island into a system of three counties, 15 parishes, 67 townships, 3 royalties and various town sites.

Holland's survey selected the site of present-day Charlottetown to be the colonial capital of St. John's Island. In 1768 Charles Morris of Nova Scotia surveyed the town site for Charlottetown with the help of soldiers from Fort Amherst. Charlottetown was named the capital of St. John's Island by King George III in 1768, it being named after his Consort, Queen Charlotte. The garrison at Fort Amherst was moved in 1770 to Charlottetown. This resulted in Fort Amherst being abandoned as a settlement and fortification. The palisade and buildings were demolished in the 1770s and by 1779 nothing was left but the ditch and earthworks.

On November 17, 1775, during the American Revolutionary War, the colonial capital of St. John's Island was attacked by Massachusetts-based privateers in the raid on Charlottetown. The American privateers looted the Colonial Seal and took several hostages. The Seal and the hostages were later released in Boston. In 1801, the British Army upgraded its defences of the colonial capital by establishing the Prince Edward Battery on the western edge of Charlottetown in present-day Victoria Park. In support of the Prince Edward Battery's harbour defence duties, shore batteries of cannon were placed on each side of the entrance into Charlottetown Harbour. The western battery was placed 0.5 km (0.31 mi) southeast of the abandoned Fort Amherst earthworks near what is now known as "Blockhouse Point" in the community of Rocky Point. The eastern battery was placed 1.5 km (0.93 mi) northeast of the abandoned Fort Amherst earthworks at what is now known as "Battery Point" in the present day town of Stratford.

== National Historic Site ==
Following its abandonment by the British Army, the property became part of the township of Lot 65. The feudal owners of the township were Richard Wright, Esq., and Hugh Owens, Esq. In 1781, one half was sold for arrears (to the Owens Holding). The actual land containing the abandoned fortification was the first governor of St. John's Island, Walter Patterson, who acquired the land in 1773. Governor Patterson and his wife, Hester Warren, built a farmhouse on the property and named it "Warren Farm". Patterson was removed from office in 1786 and the land was left vacant until 1796 when his title was nullified. A variety of landowners farmed the property until 1959 when it was purchased by the federal government for preservation, which had designated it a National Historic Site the previous year. The present visitor center was officially opened in 1973 as part of Prince Edward Island's celebration of its centennial of provincehood.

The site is named, in part, after a fort which was renamed for Amherst. A 2007 article, "The Un-Canadians", in The Beaver, includes Amherst on a list of those in the history of Canada who are considered contemptible because he "supported plans of distributing smallpox-infested blankets to First Nations people." In 2008, Mi'kmaq spiritual leader John Joe Sark called the name of Port-la-Joye–Fort Amherst a "terrible blotch on Canada", and said, "To have a place named after General Amherst would be like having a city in Jerusalem named after Adolf Hitler...it's disgusting." Sark raised his concerns again in a January 29, 2016, letter to the federal government. Mi'kmaq historian Daniel N. Paul, who referred to Amherst as motivated by white supremacist beliefs, also supports a name change, saying "In the future I don't think there should ever be anything named after people who committed what can be described as crimes against humanity." In February 2016, a spokesperson for Parks Canada said it would review the matter after a proper complaint is filed, and after consultation with the Historic Sites and Monuments Board. Ultimately, the minister responsible for Parks announced a name change for the site, from Port-la-Joye–Fort Amherst NHS to Skmaqn–Port-la-Joye–Fort Amherst NHS on February 16, 2018. The additional Mi’kmaq word means “the waiting place”, and is thought to originate between 1725 and 1758, "when Mi’kmaq and French leaders met annually at the site to renew their relationship and military alliance."

== Special events ==
In July 1989, Port-la-Joye—Fort Amherst National Historic Site was host to the 7th Canadian Scout Jamboree — "CJ '89" — which became the second largest population center in the province for a two-week period, with over 10,000 campers on site.

== See also ==
- Military history of Nova Scotia
- List of French forts in North America
