= RCAF Station Charlottetown =

Airport in Prince Edward Island, Canada

- Sherwood, Prince Edward Island in Canada

Location
- Location in Prince Edward Island
- Coordinates: 46°16′50″N 63°7′25″W

Site history
- Built: 1938
- In use: 1 February 1946

RCAF Station Charlottetown was a Royal Canadian Air Force station located in Sherwood, Prince Edward Island. Today's Charlottetown Airport maintains a remnant of the airfield's runways near its general aviation terminal, but all buildings and most infrastructure have been removed.

== Charlottetown Airport ==
The site of RCAF Station Charlottetown is located in the northeast part of Queens Royalty. It was selected by the City of Charlottetown for a civilian aerodrome to serve central Prince Edward Island in 1938 after the city's original aerodrome, Upton Field, was considered too small and obsolete. A 300-acre (1.2 km^{2}) property between the Brackley Point and Norwood/Union roads was purchased for $30,000 by the municipal government. The municipal and provincial governments divided the cost of developing the new airport in exchange for an equivalent division of revenue sharing. The municipal government maintained title to the facility and agreed to operate it.

Following the outbreak of World War II and the creation of the British Commonwealth Air Training Plan, the city of Charlottetown offered its airfield to the federal government in December 1939 for military use until the conclusion of the Second World War. The offer was accepted and on 1 May 1940 the Department of National Defence announced the establishment of No. 5 Bombing and Gunnery School (B&GS) under the British Commonwealth Air Training Plan (BCATP), with the provision for a bombing range to be built in the Prince Edward Island National Park near the fishing port of Covehead. Local fishermen on the north shore protested against the school and plans were cancelled in 1941 when No. 5 B&GS was ultimately moved to RCAF Station Dafoe in Saskatchewan.

In preparation for military use, the airfield underwent significant expansion with the main access point being changed to Norwood/Union Road. Three paved runways were constructed in the classic BCATP "triangle" configuration, along with various buildings and support facilities.

=== Aerodrome information ===
In approximately 1942 the aerodrome was listed as RCAF Aerodrome - Charlottetown, Prince Edward Island at 46°17′N 63°08′W with a variation of 25 degrees west and elevation of 186 ft (57 m). Three runways were listed as follows:

Runway name	Length	Width	Surface
8/26	2,995 ft (913 m)	175 ft (53 m)	Hard surfaced
7/25	2,500 ft (760 m)	150 ft (46 m)	Hard surfaced
13/31	2,500 ft (760 m)	150 ft (46 m)	Hard surfaced

== RCAF Station Charlottetown ==
Whereas the Royal Canadian Air Force was operating its airfield at RCAF Station Summerside and another further to the west at RCAF Station Mount Pleasant, the Charlottetown airfield was to be controlled by the Royal Air Force (RAF). Construction was completed and the RAF took tactical control of the facility on 15 June 1941. Although a RAF officer commanded the facility the RCAF maintained administrative and operational control of the school and facility and it was RCAF Station Charlottetown.

The RAF school located at RCAF Station Charlottetown was No. 31 General Reconnaissance School (GRS), which flew the Avro Anson. The RAF's No. 32 Air Navigation School was also located at the airfield until it merged with the RCAF's No. 2 Air Navigation School in 1944. RAF schools in Canada during the war were extensions of the British Commonwealth Training Plan until they were officially incorporated into the BCATP in 1942.

The RAF presence in Prince Edward Island disappeared when the No. 31 GRS ceased operation in February 1944 and the RCAF's No. 2 Air Navigation School (ANS) began operation.

The No. 2 ANS ceased operation in July 1945 and the No. 1 Aircraft Holding Unit (AHU) used the aerodrome for a short period until it closed later in 1945. All military activities were subsequently transferred to RCAF Station Summerside.

Over 1,200 students from Commonwealth nations had graduated from the facility. Approximately 200-300 RCAF and RAF personnel had been stationed at the training station and it employed 100 civilian workers during peak training operations.

Along with RCAF Station Summerside, the Charlottetown airfield also supported various patrol operations by the RCAF's Eastern Command, including coastal patrol aircraft dedicated to hunting German U-boats which were operating in the Gulf of St. Lawrence and St. Lawrence River during the 1942 - 1944 period. U-boats sank dozens of cargo and warships during the Battle of the St. Lawrence.

Following the airfield's decommissioning, the Department of Transport took over the Charlottetown Airport from the RCAF on 1 February 1946 and the airfield returned to civilian use.
