= Main stage =

Main stage or mainstage refers to the largest or most prestigious space of a theatre building and to the productions performed in that space. Mainstage theatre has been historically distinguished from smaller-scale studio theatre. It is usually performed in a proscenium theatre or on a thrust stage. Main stage is also used to describe the performance space with the largest audience capacity at a performing arts festival or other venues.

== Historical usage ==
In the 19th and early 20th centuries almost all theatres were built on the proscenium model. With the growth of studio theatres from the 1920s and their increasing adoption by traditional theatres as an ancillary space for smaller productions, theatrical management began to differentiate between its "main theatre" and "studio theatre." The concept of the main theatre became unattractive to those members of the profession working on large-scale events and others who felt that it was a diminishing part of modern theatre. The phrase "main theatre" lacked significance for those institutions that had a single traditional stage only. By the end of the 20th century the term "main stage" was well established as a description of traditional western theatres and the productions performed in them.

== Modern usage ==
=== Music festivals ===
A music festival is a festival oriented towards music that is sometimes presented with a theme such as musical genre, nationality or locality of musicians, or holiday. They are commonly held outdoors, and are often inclusive of other attractions such as food and merchandise vending machines, performance art, and social activities. Large music festivals such as Lollapalooza are constructed around well known main stage acts and lesser known musicians and bands on side stages. Many festivals are annual, or repeat at some other interval, and have modular staging of many types. Each year Lollapalooza often features multiple acts on its main and side stages.

=== Strip clubs ===
In strip clubs, the main stage is where the currently featured performer will dance as part of a rotation. In most clubs the main stage is a dominant feature of the layout. During each set of one or more songs, the current performer will dance on stage in exchange for tips. Dancers collect tips from customers either while on stage or after the dancer has finished a stage show and is mingling with the audience. A customary tip (where customers can do so at the stage) is a dollar bill folded lengthwise and placed in the dancer's garter from the tip rail. The area of the tip rail is equivalent to the apron in traditional theatre.

The most common type of strip club main stage is the thrust stage, but the other major forms are also used regularly. Theatre in the round is also a popular form of strip club staging for its main stage.
