= Land Purchase Act, 1875 =

Canadian provincial law

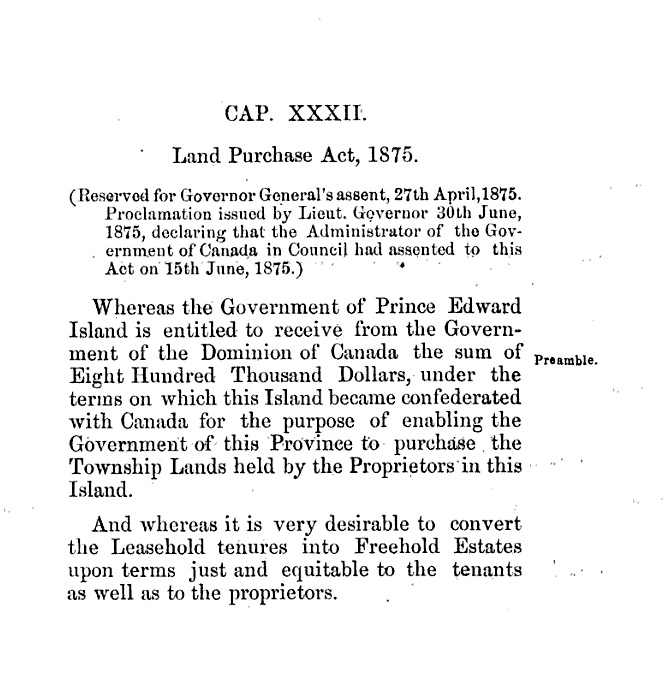

General Assembly of Prince Edward Island
- Citation: SPEI 1875, c. 32
- Territorial extent: Prince Edward Island
- Enacted by: General Assembly of Prince Edward Island
- Enacted: June 30, 1875

The Land Purchase Act, 1875 was a statute passed by the General Assembly of Prince Edward Island in 1875. Much of the land in the province was owned by absentee landlords, and the objective of the statute was to force the landlords to sell their estates to the provincial government, which would in turn sell the land at lower prices to local farmers.

The statute transformed land ownership in the province. The issues that were ultimately addressed by the legislation represented a key element in the negotiations that led to Prince Edward Island's entry into Confederation in 1873. William Buell Richards, the first Chief Justice of Canada, wrote that the Land Purchase Act was to be "viewed not as ordinary legislation, but as the settling of an important question of great moment to the community, and in principle like the abolition of the Seigniorial tenure in Lower Canada and the settling of the land question in Ireland. [...] The great object of the Statute seems to have been to convert the leasehold tenures into freehold estates, a matter of very great importance, and one which, if not settled, would be likely to affect the peace as well as the prosperity of the province."

== Background ==
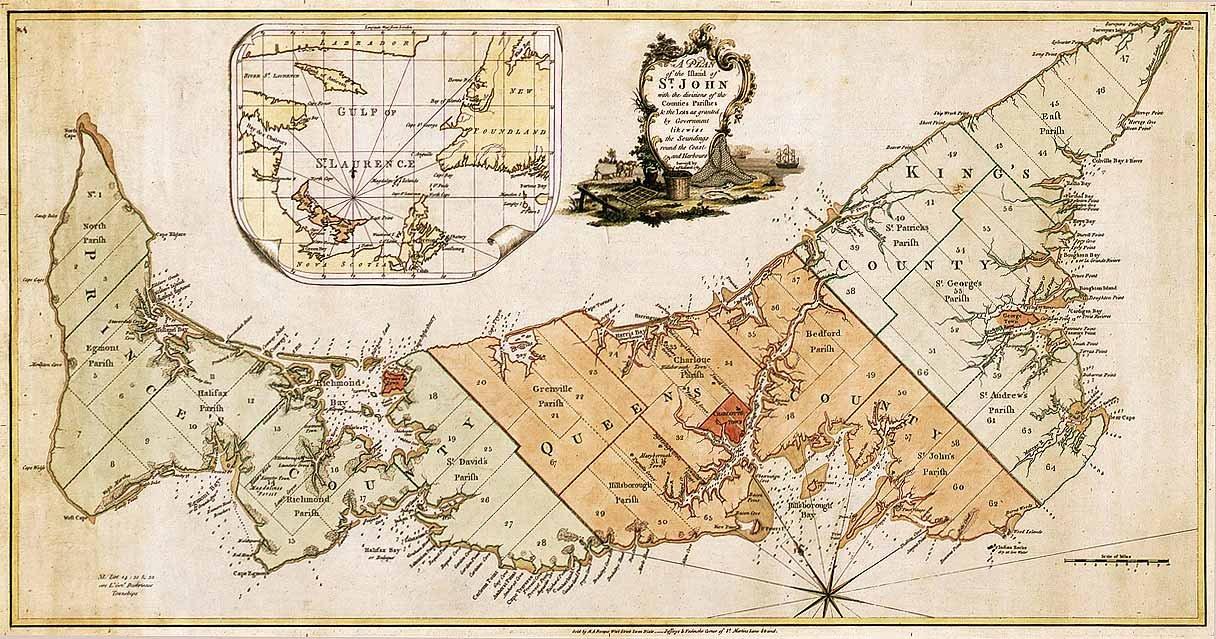
A 1775 plan of the island, as surveyed by Samuel Holland in 1764, showing counties and parishes, as well as the lots granted by the Crown

In the mid 18th-century, Prince Edward Island was divided into 67 lots, and these lots were allocated to supporters of King George III by means of a lottery in 1767. As a result, most of the property on the island was owned by absentee landlords in England, many of whom refused to pay local taxes in the colony, causing resentment among the colony's tenant farmers.

The colonial government first attempted to address the "land question" by enacting the Quit Rent Act in 1774 in order to force the absentee landowners to pay quit rent to help fund local administration and infrastructure. When Governor Walter Patterson attempted in 1771 to seize the properties of owners who had not paid their rents, the Crown removed Patterson from office and overturned his actions.

In 1853, the colonial government passed the first Land Purchase Act which empowered it to purchase estates from absentee landowners and to resell the land at lower prices to local farmers. The effort was unsuccessful as landlords could not be forced to sell, and the government lacked the funds to offer attractive prices.

== Confederation ==
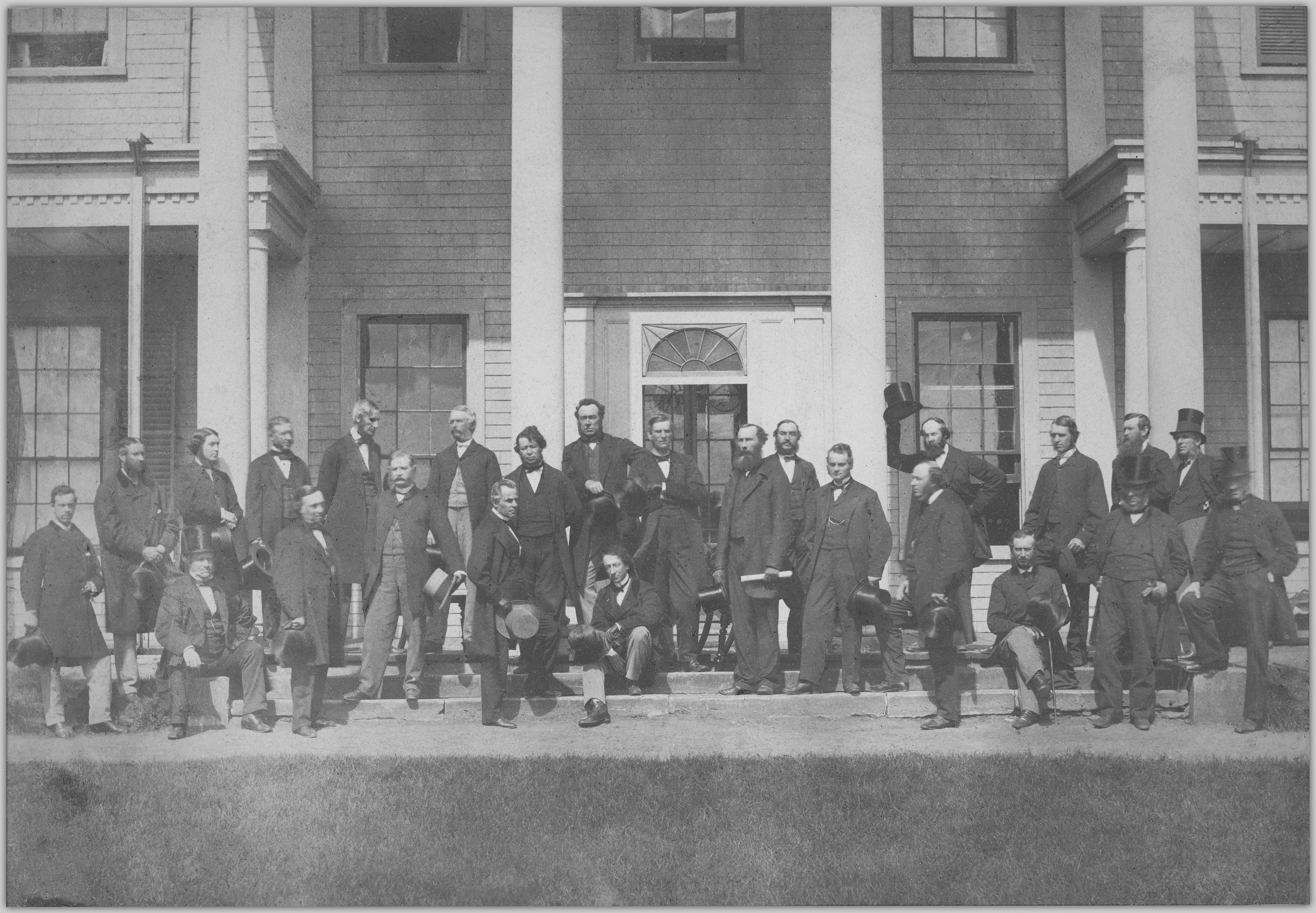
Delegates at the Charlottetown Conference in 1864, where Confederation was discussed; Prince Edward Island held out in joining Confederation until it was given financial assistance in buying out the holdings of absentee landlords

In 1873, Prince Edward Island agreed to join Confederation, and one of the terms of union was that the federal government of Canada agreed to contribute $800,000 towards the purchase of absentee landholdings on the Island. When Prince Edward Island subsequently enacted a land purchase statute in 1874, Governor General Dufferin, himself a landlord of estates in Ireland, rejected the statute without even consulting the federal cabinet, on the basis that the legislation was "monstrous". Dufferin later acceded to the statute, and on June 30, 1875, the Land Purchase Act, 1875 received royal assent. The sale of estates in Prince Edward Island larger than 500 acres (200 ha) became compulsory. By the 1880s, the provincial government had purchased 844,000 acres (342,000 ha) and resold 624,000 acres (253,000 ha) to farmers.

== Legacy ==
Some of the principles of the 1875 statute continue to this day in the Prince Edward Island Lands Protection Act. Non-residents are not permitted to purchase land in the province in excess of 2 hectares (4.9 acres) without approval from the cabinet.

The Strathgartney Homestead in Bonshaw, a 13-hectare (32-acre) remnant of a large 19th-century estate, was designated a National Historic Site of Canada in 1996 on the basis that it represents both the old land tenure system that once dominated the island, and the subsequent transformation of the province under the Land Purchase Act of 1875.
