= Walter Patterson (governor) =

Canadian politician

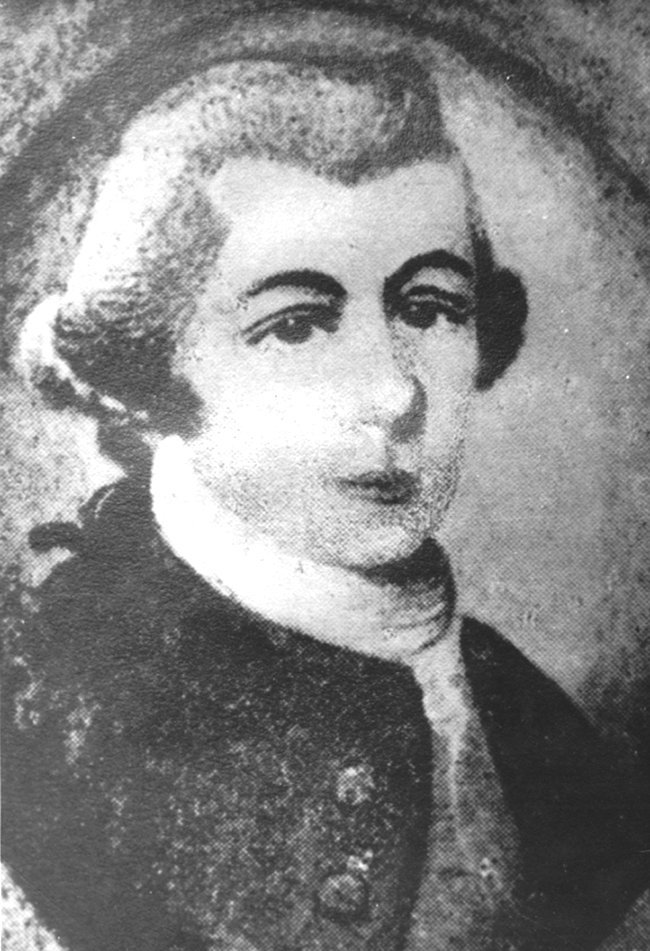

Lieutenant-Governor of St. John's Island
- In office 19 July 1769 – 17 June 1786
- Preceded by: Inaugural holder
- Succeeded by: Edmund Fanning

Personal details
- Born: c. 1735 Ramelton, County Donegal, Kingdom of Ireland
- Died: 6 September 1798 (aged 62–63) London, England
- Spouse: Hester Warren (after 1770)
- Relations: Daniel Patterson (nephew)
- Children: 4
- Parent(s): William Patterson; Elizabeth Todd

Military service
- Allegiance: Great Britain
- Branch/service: 80th Regiment of Light-Armed Foot
- Rank: Captain
- Battles/wars: Seven Years' War

Walter Patterson (c. 1735 – 6 September 1798) was the first British colonial Governor of Prince Edward Island.

== Birth and life in the military ==
The son of William Patterson of Foxhall, near Ramelton, County Donegal, and Elizabeth, daughter of William Thornton Todd of Buncrana Castle, County Donegal. He was a first cousin of Isaac Todd. Patterson joined the British Army early in life, participating in the Seven Years' War with the 80th Regiment of Light-Armed Foot. He was soon appointed to the rank of Captain.

== Governor ==
In 1763, Prince Edward Island (then known as St. John's Island) was ceded to the British by the French, and it became a British colony. In 1764, Patterson requested grants to own land on the island, and he and his brother, John Patterson (father of future U.S. Naval hero Commodore Daniel Patterson), were awarded Lot 19, near the present-day town of Kensington, through the 1767 land lottery.

On 30 May 1769, the British Privy Council declared St. John's Island a colony with its own government, separating it from Nova Scotia. Patterson was appointed the island's first Governor on 19 July 1769 and arrived on the island on 30 August 1770. Soon after taking the Oath of Office in September 1770, Patterson had already formed an Executive Council, and one of his and the council's first ordinances was to enforce the payment of Quit-Rent.

Following the first Assembly elections in 1773, Patterson acquired over 100,000 acres (400 km^{2}) of land from proprietors who had failed to pay their quit-rent. The land was to be sold off. The former proprietors wrote to the British government asking that their land be returned, and when this failed, they asked that Patterson be removed from office. This was to the first of several incidents which would cause tension between the British government and Governor Patterson.

Soon after the petitions were sorted through in England, the Secretary of State from the British government wrote to Patterson, on 24 July 1783, ordering him to present a bill to the Assembly, one which Patterson was told he had to support. The bill was for the annulment of the land sales. Going against the British government, Patterson opposed the bill and managed to receive a majority from the Executive Council, supporting his decision.

The British government retaliated by removing Walter Patterson from office, on 17 June 1786. He officially left office on 4 November. Patterson returned to England in 1789, where he died nine years later. The issue of absentee landowners and quit-rent in Prince Edward Island would not be resolved until the passage of the Land Purchase Act in 1875.

== Personal life ==
Walter Patterson was married to Hester Warren in 1770. Unhappy on St. John's Island, she returned to England in 1771. They had two children, John and Charlotte.

Patterson had two additional children on St. John's Island with his companion Margaret Hyde. The Hyde family (Thomas Hyde, his two sons and four daughters) arrived in Canada from England in 1770, on the same boat as Governor Patterson.

Patterson He died in poverty at his lodgings in Castle Street, Oxford Market, London on 6 September 1798.
