= 1717 in Canada =

- Decades: 1690s; 1700s; 1710s; 1720s; 1730s
- See also: History of Canada; Timeline of Canadian history; List of years in Canada

Events from the year 1717 in Canada.

== Incumbents ==
- French Monarch: Louis XV
- British and Irish Monarch: George I

=== Governors ===
- Governor General of New France: Philippe de Rigaud Vaudreuil
- Colonial Governor of Louisiana: Jean-Michel de Lepinay
- Governor of Nova Scotia: Thomas Caulfeild then Samuel Vetch then Richard Philipps then John Doucett
- Governor of Placentia: Samuel Gledhill

== Events ==
- Fort Kaministiquia was founded by French merchants to be the first in a series of forts reaching westward to expand trade and seek a route to the western sea. (Daniel Greysolon Dulhut had built a fort, (Fort Caministigoyan), at the same location on the Kaministiquia River in 1679.)
- Fort Prince of Wales founded by the Hudson's Bay Company, (rebuilt later in stone in 1731.)

== Births ==
- January 29 - Jeffrey Amherst, 1st Baron Amherst, army officer (died 1797)
- November 9 - Louis-Joseph Gaultier de La Vérendrye, French Canadian fur trader and explorer (died 1761).

== Deaths ==
- Pierre Boucher, explorer (born 1622)
