= 1726 in Canada =

- Decades: 1700s; 1710s; 1720s; 1730s; 1740s
- See also: History of Canada; Timeline of Canadian history; List of years in Canada

Events from the year 1726 in Canada.

== Incumbents ==
- French Monarch: Louis XV
- British and Irish Monarch: George I

=== Governors ===
- Governor General of New France: Charles de la Boische, Marquis de Beauharnois
- Colonial Governor of Louisiana: Pierre Dugué de Boisbriand
- Governor of Nova Scotia: John Doucett then Lawrence Armstrong
- Governor of Placentia: Samuel Gledhill

== Events ==
- Claude-Thomas Dupuy took up his duties as intendant of New France.
- Charles de la Boische, Marquis de Beauharnois was appointed as Governor of New France.
- Thomas-Jacques Taschereau arrived in New France (Canada) as a private secretary to the Intendant of New France, Claude-Thomas Dupuy.

== Births ==
- June 24 : Robert Monckton, army officer and colonial administrator (died 1782)

=== Full date unknown ===
- Robert Prescott, Governor of Canada (died 1815)

== Deaths ==
- July 27 : Étienne de Carheil, missionary.

=== Date unknown ===
- Étienne Jacob, court officer.
