= 1739 in Canada =

- Decades: 1710s; 1720s; 1730s; 1740s; 1750s
- See also: History of Canada; Timeline of Canadian history; List of years in Canada

Events from the year 1739 in Canada.

== Incumbents ==
- French Monarch: Louis XV
- British and Irish Monarch: George II

=== Governors ===
- Governor General of New France: Charles de la Boische, Marquis de Beauharnois
- Colonial Governor of Louisiana: Jean-Baptiste Le Moyne de Bienville
- Governor of Nova Scotia: Lawrence Armstrong
- Commodore-Governor of Newfoundland: Henry Medley

== Events ==
- Joseph La France begins to explore between Lake Superior and Hudson Bay.
- Census of New France counts 42,801 inhabitants.

== Births ==
- February 23: Jean-François Hubert, bishop of Quebec (d. 1797)
- August: Alexander Henry the elder, fur trader, merchant, militia officer, jp, and author (d. 1824)

== Deaths ==
- May 19: Marie Barbier de l'Assomption, sister of the Congrégation de Notre-Dame (born 1663)

=== Full date unknown ===
- Thomas Bird, Hudson's Bay Company chief at Albany Fort
