= 1725 in Canada =

- Decades: 1700s; 1710s; 1720s; 1730s; 1740s
- See also: History of Canada; Timeline of Canadian history; List of years in Canada

Events from the year 1725 in Canada.

== Incumbents ==
- French Monarch: Louis XV
- British and Irish Monarch: George I

=== Governors ===
- Governor General of New France: Philippe de Rigaud Vaudreuil then Charles de la Boische, Marquis de Beauharnois
- Colonial Governor of Louisiana: Pierre Dugué de Boisbriand
- Governor of Nova Scotia: John Doucett
- Governor of Placentia: Samuel Gledhill

== Events ==
- August 27 - French ship Chameau sank near Louisbourg.
- Claude-Thomas Dupuy was appointed intendant of New France.
- Peter the Great sends Vitus Bering to explore the North Pacific.
- 1725-1729 - First Arctic expedition of Vitus Bering.

== Births ==
- Juan José Pérez Hernández, naval officer and explorer (died 1775)
