= 1724 in Canada =

- Decades: 1700s; 1710s; 1720s; 1730s; 1740s
- See also: History of Canada; Timeline of Canadian history; List of years in Canada

Events from the year 1724 in Canada.

== Incumbents ==
- French Monarch: Louis XV
- British and Irish Monarch: George I

=== Governors ===
- Governor General of New France: Philippe de Rigaud Vaudreuil
- Colonial Governor of Louisiana: Jean-Baptiste Le Moyne de Bienville
- Governor of Nova Scotia: John Doucett
- Governor of Placentia: Samuel Gledhill

== Births ==
- April 30 - Jean-Baptiste de La Brosse, Jesuit, priest, missionary, and professor (died 1782)
