= 1715 in Canada =

- Decades: 1690s; 1700s; 1710s; 1720s; 1730s
- See also: History of Canada; Timeline of Canadian history; List of years in Canada

Events from the year 1715 in Canada.

== Incumbents ==
- French monarch: Louis XIV (until September 1), then Louis XV
- British and Irish monarch: George I

=== Governors ===
- Governor General of New France: Philippe de Rigaud Vaudreuil
- Colonial Governor of Louisiana: Antoine de la Mothe Cadillac
- Governor of Nova Scotia: Francis Nicholson then Samuel Vetch then Thomas Caulfeild
- Governor of Placentia: John Moody

== Births ==
- Sir William Johnson, 1st Baronet, superintendent of northern Indians (died 1774)
