= 1722 in Canada =

- Decades: 1700s; 1710s; 1720s; 1730s; 1740s
- See also: History of Canada; Timeline of Canadian history; List of years in Canada

Events from the year 1722 in Canada.

== Incumbents ==
- French Monarch: Louis XV
- British and Irish Monarch: George I

=== Governors ===
- Governor General of New France: Philippe de Rigaud Vaudreuil
- Colonial Governor of Louisiana: Jean-Baptiste Le Moyne de Bienville
- Governor of Nova Scotia: John Doucett
- Governor of Placentia: Samuel Gledhill

== Events ==
- The Tuscarora become the sixth tribe of the Iroquois Confederacy.
- Haudenosaunee League admits Tuscarora as 6th Nation. The refugee band was accepted according to the terms of the League Constitution. No other Native Nations had such a provision as this, other alliances and "confederations" were all temporary and informal.

== Births ==
- March 23 - born Marguerite-Thérèse Lemoine Despins (1722–1792) the second Mother Superior of the Grey Nuns. (died 1792)
