= 1732 in Canada =

- Decades: 1710s; 1720s; 1730s; 1740s; 1750s
- See also: History of Canada; Timeline of Canadian history; List of years in Canada

Events from the year 1732 in Canada.

== Incumbents ==
- French Monarch: Louis XV
- British and Irish Monarch: George II

=== Governors ===
- Governor General of New France: Charles de la Boische, Marquis de Beauharnois
- Colonial Governor of Louisiana: Étienne Perier
- Governor of Nova Scotia: Lawrence Armstrong
- Commodore-Governor of Newfoundland: Edward Falkingham

== Events ==
- 1732: Fort St. Charles, on Lake of the Woods was constructed by La Vérendrye's nephew, Christopher Dufrost de La Jemeraye and his eldest son Jean Baptiste de La Vérendrye.
- Charles-Michel Mesaiger was the first priest on Lake of the Woods and at Fort St. Charles.

== Deaths ==
- Daniel d'Auger de Subercase, Governor of Acadia
