= 1727 in Canada =

- Decades: 1700s; 1710s; 1720s; 1730s; 1740s
- See also: History of Canada; Timeline of Canadian history; List of years in Canada

Events from the year 1727 in Canada.

== Incumbents ==
- French Monarch: Louis XV
- British and Irish Monarch: George I (until June 11), then George II

=== Governors ===
- Governor General of New France: Charles de la Boische, Marquis de Beauharnois
- Colonial Governor of Louisiana: Pierre Dugué de Boisbriand then Étienne Perier
- Governor of Nova Scotia: Lawrence Armstrong
- Governor of Placentia: Samuel Gledhill

== Births ==
- January 2 - James Wolfe, British Army officer (died 1759)
- February 7 - Charles Deschamps de Boishébert et de Raffetot, military (died 1797)
- March 23 - Philippe-François de Rastel de Rocheblave, soldier, businessman and political figure in Lower Canada (died 1802)

== Deaths ==
- November 10 - Alphonse de Tonty, officer (born 1659)
- December 26 - Jean-Baptiste de La Croix de Chevrières de Saint-Vallier (born 1653)
