= 1728 in Canada =

- Decades: 1700s; 1710s; 1720s; 1730s; 1740s
- See also: History of Canada; Timeline of Canadian history; List of years in Canada

Events from the year 1728 in Canada.

== Incumbents ==
- French Monarch: Louis XV
- British and Irish Monarch: George II

=== Governors ===
- Governor General of New France: Charles de la Boische, Marquis de Beauharnois
- Colonial Governor of Louisiana: Étienne Perier
- Governor of Nova Scotia: Lawrence Armstrong
- Governor of Placentia: Samuel Gledhill

== Events ==
- Pierre Gaultier de Varennes et de La Vérendrye was appointed commandant of the French posts on the north shore of Lake Superior and stationed at Fort Kaministiquia.
- Vitus Bering sails through the Bering Strait.

== Births ==
- November 7 [O.S. October 27] - James Cook killed by Hawaiian natives, cutting short his search for Northwest Passage. (died 1779)
- Samuel Holland, army officer, military engineer, surveyor, office holder, politician, and landowner (died 1801)

== Deaths ==
- February 20 - J Raudot, Intendant of New France (born 1638)
