= 1734 in Canada =

- Decades: 1710s; 1720s; 1730s; 1740s; 1750s
- See also: History of Canada; Timeline of Canadian history; List of years in Canada

Events from the year 1734 in Canada.

== Incumbents ==
- French Monarch: Louis XV
- British and Irish Monarch: George II

=== Governors ===
- Governor General of New France: Charles de la Boische, Marquis de Beauharnois
- Colonial Governor of Louisiana: Jean-Baptiste le Moyne de Bienville
- Governor of Nova Scotia: Lawrence Armstrong
- Commodore-Governor of Newfoundland: Edward Falkingham

== Events ==
- Jean Baptiste de La Vérendrye establishes the first Fort Maurepas on the Red River about five leagues south of Lake Winnipeg, third of the main La Vérendrye posts. (Fort Saint Pierre on Rainy River; reactivated; Fort St. Charles on Lake of the Woods.)
- A Montreal slave named Marie-Joseph Angelique learns that she is to be sold to someone else. Possibly, to obscure her attempt to escape, she may have set fire to the house of her mistress, Thérèse de Couagne. The fire could not be contained, causing damage to half of Old Montreal. She was charged, tried and hanged, bringing attention to the conditions of the slaves.

== Births ==
- January 10 – Fleury Mesplet, French-born Canadian printer
- November 22 – Jean-Louis Besnard, merchant trader based out of Montreal

== Deaths ==
- June 21: Marie-Josèphe-Angélique, accused of setting a fire in April that burned part of Montréal.
