= 1733 in Canada =

- Decades: 1710s; 1720s; 1730s; 1740s; 1750s
- See also: History of Canada; Timeline of Canadian history; List of years in Canada

Events from the year 1733 in Canada.

== Incumbents ==
- French Monarch: Louis XV
- British and Irish Monarch: George II

=== Governors ===
- Governor General of New France: Charles de la Boische, Marquis de Beauharnois
- Colonial Governor of Louisiana: Étienne Perier
- Governor of Nova Scotia: Lawrence Armstrong
- Commodore-Governor of Newfoundland: Edward Falkingham

== Events ==
- Vitus Bering's second expedition, with George Wilhelm Steller aboard, the first naturalist to visit Alaska.

== Births ==
- Marie-Josephte Corriveau, criminal (died 1763)
- François Baby, politician and businessman
