= 1718 in Canada =

- Decades: 1690s; 1700s; 1710s; 1720s; 1730s
- See also: History of Canada; Timeline of Canadian history; List of years in Canada

Events from the year 1718 in Canada.

== Incumbents ==
- French Monarch: Louis XV
- British and Irish Monarch: George I

=== Governors ===
- Governor General of New France: Philippe de Rigaud Vaudreuil
- Colonial Governor of Louisiana: Jean-Baptiste Le Moyne de Bienville
- Governor of Nova Scotia: John Doucett
- Governor of Placentia: Samuel Gledhill

== Births ==
- September 8 - Joseph Coulon de Jumonville, military officer. (died 1754)
- September 17 - Joseph Fairbanks, merchant and political figure in Nova Scotia. (died 1796) born in Sherborn, Massachusetts

=== Full date unknown ===
- John Burbidge, soldier, land owner, judge and political figure in Nova Scotia. (died 1812) born in Cowes, England
- Robert Campbell, merchant and political figure in Nova Scotia. (died 1775)

== Deaths ==
- August 4 - René Lepage de Sainte-Claire, landlord.
