= 1729 in Canada =

- Decades: 1700s; 1710s; 1720s; 1730s; 1740s
- See also: History of Canada; Timeline of Canadian history; List of years in Canada

Events from the year 1729 in Canada.

== Incumbents ==
- French Monarch: Louis XV
- British and Irish Monarch: George II

=== Governors ===
- Governor General of New France: Charles de la Boische, Marquis de Beauharnois
- Colonial Governor of Louisiana: Étienne Perier
- Governor of Nova Scotia: Lawrence Armstrong
- Governor of Placentia: Samuel Gledhill

== Events ==
- La Vérendrye became first commandant of the Posts of the West. He was posted to Fort Kaministiquia in this year and began the western expansion in 1731.
- Natchez attacked French Fort Rosalie and French settlements nearby after the French commander of the fort, Sieur Chepart, ordered them to abandon their village of White Apple. The Natchez wiped out the entire settlement and captured Fort Rosalie. In 1730 and 1731 the French, aided by the Choctaw, launched two counterattacks out of New Orleans, capturing and selling into plantation slavery most of the tribe and its smaller allies. A few bands found refuge among the Chickasaw, Creek, and Cherokee.

== Births ==
- Joseph Frederick Wallet DesBarres, governor of Cape Breton.

== Deaths ==
- Jean-François Du Verger de Verville, designer of the Fortress of Louisbourg.
