= John Adams (merchant) =

Canadian merchant and politician

John Adams (1672 or 1673 – c. 1745) was an American-born Canadian merchant and member of the Nova Scotia Council. He was the father-in-law of Henry Newton.

== Biography ==
Adams was born in Boston in either 1672 or 1673 to John and Avis Adams. Growing up as a petty merchant, Adams joined Sir Charles Hobby's New England regiment, participating in the capture of Port-Royal in 1710. Shortly thereafter, Adams settled in Annapolis Royal, Nova Scotia, returning to civilian life. There, he traded manufactured goods with the province's Acadian and Native Americans, and took up the role of a real estate agent and contractor. Adams joined the Executive Council of Nova Scotia on 28 April 1720, holding his position there for 20 years; the records show that few served as long as he did. He also held several other public positions in the province. Adams was appointed a notary public and deputy collector of customs for Annapolis Royal in 1725, and he was commissioned a justice of the peace in March 1727.

Around the mid-1720s, Adams' poor eyesight began to fail, leading to his near-blindness in 1730. After this, he was less active in community activities and trade. Adams petitioned to the king for a pension several times, but failed. He blamed his disability on over-exposure to the sun during an Indian attack on Annapolis Royal in 1724. In December 1739, Lieutenant Governor Lawrence Armstrong died. With the absence of Major Mascarene to take Armstrong's place, Adams became the new president of the council and head of the civil government. (Alexander Cosby was also vying for the position.) In a meeting on 22 March 1740, with the return of Mascarene, the councilors declared that he was the council's rightful president. This turn of events led Adams to retire to Boston in late August or early September 1740, where he stayed for the rest of his life. He died some time after 1745.
