= 1730 in Canada =

- Decades: 1710s; 1720s; 1730s; 1740s; 1750s
- See also: History of Canada; Timeline of Canadian history; List of years in Canada

Events from the year 1730 in Canada.

== Incumbents ==
- French Monarch: Louis XV
- British and Irish Monarch: George II

=== Governors ===
- Governor General of New France: Charles de la Boische, Marquis de Beauharnois
- Colonial Governor of Louisiana: Étienne Perier
- Governor of Nova Scotia: Lawrence Armstrong
- Commodore-Governor of Newfoundland: Henry Osborn

== Events ==
- Seven Cherokee chiefs visit London and form an alliance, The Articles of Agreement, with King George II.
- 1730s: The Mississauga drive the Seneca Iroquois south of Lake Erie.

== Deaths ==
- Antoine Laumet Cadillac, founder of Detroit.
