= 1736 in Canada =

- Decades: 1710s; 1720s; 1730s; 1740s; 1750s
- See also: History of Canada; Timeline of Canadian history; List of years in Canada

Events from the year 1736 in Canada.

== Incumbents ==
- French Monarch: Louis XV
- British and Irish Monarch: George II

=== Governors ===
- Governor General of New France: Charles de la Boische, Marquis de Beauharnois
- Colonial Governor of Louisiana: Jean-Baptiste le Moyne de Bienville
- Governor of Nova Scotia: Lawrence Armstrong
- Commodore-Governor of Newfoundland: Jean-Baptiste Le Moyne de Bienville

== Events ==
- Father Jean-Pierre Aulneau, Jean Baptiste de La Vérendrye and 19 French voyageurs were headed from Fort St. Charles to Montreal via Fort St. Pierre. On their first night out they were massacred by Sioux warriors on a nearby island in Lake of the Woods. The date was June 8.

== Deaths ==
- March 25 - François-Marie Bissot, Sieur de Vincennes, explorer and soldier (born 1700).

=== Full date unknown ===
- Christopher Dufrost de La Jemeraye died May 10 of this year. In ill health he was travelling from Fort Maurepas (Canada) on the Red River to Fort St. Charles on Lake of the Woods. He was buried near the junction of the Red and Rousseau rivers (born 1708).
- Jean Baptiste de La Vérendrye died June 6, the eldest son of Pierre Gaultier de Varennes, sieur de La Vérendrye (born 1713).
