= Timeline of Quebec City history =

This is a timeline of the history of Quebec City.

== 16th century ==
- 1535 - Jacques Cartier arrived and later winters in the village of Stadacona

== 17th century ==
- 1608 – L'Habitation (Quebec City) was founded by Samuel de Champlain, near the ruins of Stadacona.
- 1615 – The first missionaries, the Recollets, arrived in the city.
- 1629-32 – the city briefly passed into possession of the English.
- 1629 – The Recollets left New France but returned in 1670.
- 1632 – Treaty of Saint-Germain-en-Laye (1632).
- 1635 – The Jesuits arrived and found the Collège de Québec.
- 1636 – Charles Huault de Montmagny became the settlement’s governor, who presided over expansion of the settlement and construction of its first church, Notre Dame de la Paix.
- 1639 – The Ursulines arrived; Ecole des Ursulines, Quebec established.
- 1639 – The Augustines arrived; Hôtel-Dieu de Québec founded by Augustinians. It was administered by the Augustinian order until 1962.
- 1647 – The first Notre-Dame de Québec Cathedral constructed.
- 1648 – The first Chateau St. Louis was built under the direction of Charles de Montmagny.
- 1663 – Quebec became the capital city of New France, the population of Quebec and its surrounding farm lands had reached 1,950 people.
- 1663 – Petit Séminaire of Quebec founded.
- 1687-1723 – Notre-Dame-des-Victoires constructed.
- 1690 – The Battle of Quebec (1690) during King William's War.
- 1693-95 – Old Parliament Building (Quebec) built.

== 18th century ==
- 1711 – Quebec Expedition.
- 1726 – Claude-Thomas Dupuy commissioned Claude Barolet as royal notary for Quebec City
- 1754-63 – French and Indian War was the North American chapter of the Seven Years' War, known in Quebec as the War of the Conquest.
- 1758 – Siege of Louisbourg (1758).
- 1759 – Battle of Beauport.
- 1759 – In the Battle of the Plains of Abraham, the city was permanently lost by the French.
- 1760 – Battle of Sainte-Foy and Siege of Quebec (1760)
- 1763 – Treaty of Paris. France formally ceded its claims to Canada, and Quebec City's French-speaking, Catholic population was under the rule of Protestant Britain.
- 1774 – The Quebec Act.
- 1775 – Battle of Quebec (1775).
- 1789 – The theater company Les Jeunes Messieurs Canadiens is inaugurated.
- 1791 – The Constitutional Act of 1791.
- 1791 – Anglican Diocese of Quebec created.

== 19th century ==
- 1804 – Holy Trinity Anglican Cathedral completed.
- 1807 – The construction of St. Andrew's Church (Quebec City) began.
- 1805-63 – Quebec Mercury published.
- 1819 – Roman Catholic Archdiocese of Quebec established.
- 1820 – The construction of the Citadelle of Quebec began.
- 1824 – Literary and Historical Society of Quebec founded.
- 1840 – La Maison Simons founded.
- 1845 – Quebec City fires
- 1848 – Institut canadien de Québec founded.
- 1848 – The last Canadian Récollet Brother Louis died at Quebec City.
- 1850s – Quebec Skating Rink opened.
- 1855 – Brunet (pharmacy) founded.
- 1857-59 – Cimetière Notre-Dame-de-Belmont constructed.
- 1862 – Morrin College founded; it is located at Morrin Centre.
- 1864 – Quebec Conference, 1864.
- 1877-86 – Parliament Building (Quebec) constructed.
- 1879 – Old Quebec Funicular opened.
- 1885 – Saint-Jean-Baptiste Church constructed.
- 1885-88 – Quebec City Armoury built.
- 1889 – Quebec rockslide.
- 1893 – Château Frontenac opened.
- 1896 – Le Soleil founded.
- 1900 – Desjardins Group founded.

== 20th century ==
- 1902 – Orchestre Symphonique de Québec founded.
- 1908 – Plains of Abraham Park became the first historic site to be protected by the federal government, acting as a catalyst for the establishment of the National Historic Site of Canada system in 1919
- 1912 – Quebec Boundaries Extension Act, 1912.
- 1915 – Gare du Palais built.
- 1917 – The construction of the Quebec Bridge, connecting the North and South banks of the St. Lawrence River, was finished.
- 1926 – Basilica of Sainte-Anne-de-Beaupré built.
- 1928 – Quebec Aces founded.
- 1930-31 – Édifice Price constructed in Old Quebec.
- 1931 – Édifice Jean-Antoine-Panet built.
- 1933 – Musée national des beaux-arts du Québec.
- 1935-37 – Édifice André-Laurendeau was built.
- 1939 – Québec City Jean Lesage International Airport established.
- 1943 – Quebec Conference, 1943; Quebec Agreement.
- 1944 – Second Quebec Conference. The conferences were held at the Citadel and nearby Château Frontenac.
- 1944 – Université du Québec established.
- 1955 – Quebec Winter Carnival established.
- 1968 – Quebec City Summer Festival established.
- 1969 – École nationale d'administration publique and Institut national de la recherche scientifique established.
- 1971 – Grand Théâtre de Québec opened, features l'Orchestre Symphonique de Quebec and concertmaster Hidetaro Suzuki.
- 1972 – Edifice Marie-Guyart completed.
- 1984 – Opération Nez rouge was founded in Quebec City.
- 1984 – Musée de la civilisation established.
- 1985 – Ramparts of Quebec City was declared a World Heritage site by UNESCO.
- 1985 – Shamrock Summit.
- 1987 – Flag of Quebec City adopted.
- 1994 – Quebec Biker war.
- 1995 – Centre hospitalier universitaire de Québec created.
- 1995
  - The Quebec Nordiques professional ice hockey team is relocated to Denver.
  - The Quebec City bid for the 2002 Winter Olympics is defeated.
- 1998 – Quebec City International Festival of Military Bands.

== 21st century ==
- 2001 – 3rd Summit of the Americas.
- 2001 – Capitale-Nationale played host to a major world sporting event, the World Police and Fire Games, which was a success for the city, with as many as 11,000 athletes and 14,000 persons accompanying them, making 25,000 persons in total.
- 2002 – Communauté métropolitaine de Québec created.
- 2002 – Quebec City Military Tattoo created.
- 2008 – The 400th anniversary of the founding.
- 2017 - Quebec City mosque shooting.
- 2020 – COVID-19 pandemic in Quebec.
- 2027 – 2027 Canada Winter Games take place.

== See also ==
- Timeline of Quebec history
- List of years in Canada
