= 1731 in Canada =

- Decades: 1710s; 1720s; 1730s; 1740s; 1750s
- See also: History of Canada; Timeline of Canadian history; List of years in Canada

Events from the year 1731 in Canada.

== Incumbents ==
- French Monarch: Louis XV
- British and Irish Monarch: George II

=== Governors ===
- Governor General of New France: Charles de la Boische, Marquis de Beauharnois
- Colonial Governor of Louisiana: Étienne Perier
- Governor of Nova Scotia: Lawrence Armstrong
- Commodore-Governor of Newfoundland: Henry Osborn

== Events ==
- 1731: Fort St. Pierre on Rainy Lake established by Christopher Dufrost de La Jemeraye and Jean Baptiste de La Vérendrye. This was the first fort in La Verendrye's expansion of the "Posts of the West".
- 1731-43: The La Verendrye family organize expeditions beyond Lake Winnipeg and direct fur trade toward the east.

== Births ==
- Richard Dobie, an early Canadian businessman and a sometimes partner of Benjamin Frobisher (died 1805).
- November 7: Robert Rogers, army officer and author (died 1795).

== Deaths ==
- Robert Chevalier Beauchêne, adventurer in New France.
