= 1737 in Canada =

- Decades: 1710s; 1720s; 1730s; 1740s; 1750s
- See also: History of Canada; Timeline of Canadian history; List of years in Canada

Events from the year 1737 in Canada.

== Incumbents ==
- French Monarch: Louis XV
- British and Irish Monarch: George II

=== Governors ===
- Governor General of New France: Charles de la Boische, Marquis de Beauharnois
- Colonial Governor of Louisiana: Jean-Baptiste le Moyne de Bienville
- Governor of Nova Scotia: Lawrence Armstrong
- Commodore-Governor of Newfoundland: Jean-Baptiste Le Moyne de Bienville

== Events ==
- Marguerite d'Youville (Born Varennes, France October 15, 1701 Died December 28, 1771) and some friends in Montreal, begin taking in the poor and educating abandoned children.

== Births ==
=== Full date unknown ===
- Matonabbee, leading Indian (d.1782)

== Deaths ==
- 29 September - Joseph Adams, chief factor of the Hudson's Bay Company. (b. 1700)
