= 1716 in Canada =

- Decades: 1690s; 1700s; 1710s; 1720s; 1730s
- See also: History of Canada; Timeline of Canadian history; List of years in Canada

Events from the year 1716 in Canada.

== Incumbents ==
- French Monarch: Louis XV
- British and Irish Monarch: George I

=== Governors ===
- Governor General of New France: Philippe de Rigaud Vaudreuil
- Colonial Governor of Louisiana: Antoine de la Mothe Cadillac then Jean-Baptiste Le Moyne de Bienville
- Governor of Nova Scotia: Thomas Caulfeild
- Governor of Placentia: John Moody

== Events ==
- Jacques Talbot came to Montreal as a schoolmaster.
