= 1738 in Canada =

- Decades: 1710s; 1720s; 1730s; 1740s; 1750s
- See also: History of Canada; Timeline of Canadian history; List of years in Canada

Events from the year 1738 in Canada.

== Incumbents ==
- French Monarch: Louis XV
- British and Irish Monarch: George II

=== Governors ===
- Governor General of New France: Charles de la Boische, Marquis de Beauharnois
- Colonial Governor of Louisiana: Jean-Baptiste le Moyne de Bienville
- Governor of Nova Scotia: Lawrence Armstrong
- Commodore-Governor of Newfoundland: Jean-Baptiste Le Moyne de Bienville

== Events ==
- Smallpox strikes the Cherokee in the U.S. Southeast, killing almost half the population. Smallpox also reaches tribes in western Canada.
- Esther Brandeau, in the guise of a cabin boy, is the first known Jewish woman to arrive in Canada. Eventually she is deported to France for failing to embrace the Roman Catholic religion.
- Fort Rouge (the fort), built on the Assiniboine River near the Forks.
- Fort La Reine, one of the forts of the Pierre Gaultier de Varennes et de La Vérendrye western expansion, was built. It was located on the Assiniboine River near where present day Portage la Prairie stands.
- Pierre Gaultier de Varennes et de La Vérendrye travelled southwest from Fort La Reine to the area of the Missouri River in what is now North Dakota.

== Births ==
- June 25 - Thomas Peters, black soldier and leader (died 1792)
