= 1714 in Canada =

- Decades: 1690s; 1700s; 1710s; 1720s; 1730s
- See also: History of Canada; Timeline of Canadian history; List of years in Canada

Events from the year 1714 in Canada.

== Incumbents ==
- French Monarch: Louis XIV
- British and Irish Monarch: Anne (until August 1), then George I

=== Governors ===
- Governor General of New France: Philippe de Rigaud Vaudreuil
- Colonial Governor of Louisiana: Antoine de la Mothe Cadillac
- Governor of Nova Scotia: Francis Nicholson
- Governor of Placentia: John Moody

== Births ==
- December 1 - Pierre Gaultier de La Vérendrye, explorer (died 1755)

== Deaths ==
- October 3 - Jeanne Le Ber, religious recluse (born 1662)
- August - Pierre Maisonnat dit Baptiste, military (born 1663)
