= Claude Barolet =

Claude Barolet (c. 1690 – 25 January 1761) was a French born merchant who came to New France in approximately 1708.

Barolet developed an interest in the law shortly after his arrival and served as a clerk to Louis Chambalon, a notary for a few years. In 1728 he was commissioned as royal notary for Quebec City by Intendant Claude-Thomas Dupuy and in 1731 Intendant Gilles Hocquart expanded the commission to the entire government of Quebec.

In 1760, after the English took control, Barolet became the first notary to obtain a commission from Governor James Murray. He died shortly after the commission was issued.

There were ten children from his marriage and his eldest daughter married Jean-Claude Panet, a notary of the time. A second daughter gave birth to his first grandchild, Jacques Bedout, who became a rear-admiral in the French navy.
