= Alexander Cosby =

Canadian politician

Alexander Cosby (c. 1685–1742) was born in Ireland and had a younger sister who married Richard Philipps, governor of Nova Scotia and a military man. Through this connection, Cosby was appointed major in the 40th regiment and was stationed in Nova Scotia around 1721. He looked to be appointed lieutenant governor in 1725 but the appointment went to Lawrence Armstrong. Cosby served on the Nova Scotia Council.

This was a time when the governor was often absent as was the case with Philipps. Cosby refused to follow orders given by Armstrong and also was appointed lieutenant governor of Annapolis Royal in 1727 by Philipps to succeed John Doucett. He tried to become Governor the same time as John Adams (merchant).

It appears that Cosby was always in some kind of turmoil within the military and the governing body, a condition which continued until his death. Accounts of his actions must be tempered by the fact that his correspondence did not survive and accounts are only from the other perspectives.

His wife was Anne Cosby, who freed her three black slaves in 1788.

== Legacy ==
- Cosby House, Annapolis Royal, Nova Scotia

Political offices
| Preceded by Lawrence Armstrong | Lieutenant Governor of Nova Scotia; 1739–1740; Served under: Richard Philipps | Succeeded by Paul Mascarene |
