= Joseph France =

Joseph France may refer to:

- Joseph I. France (1873–1939), U.S. senator from Maryland
- Joseph Nathaniel France (1907–1997), Saint Kitts and Nevis politician and trade union leader
- Joseph La France (1707–1745), Métis fur trader in Canada
