= Port Mahon Dockyard =

British navy dockyard

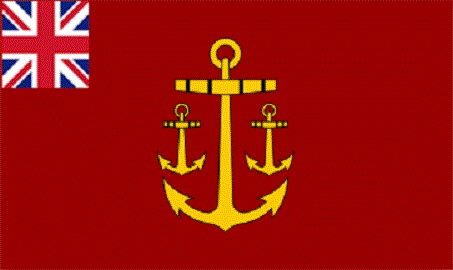
Port Mahon Dockyard
- Part of Mediterranean Fleet
- Port Mahon, Menorca, Spain
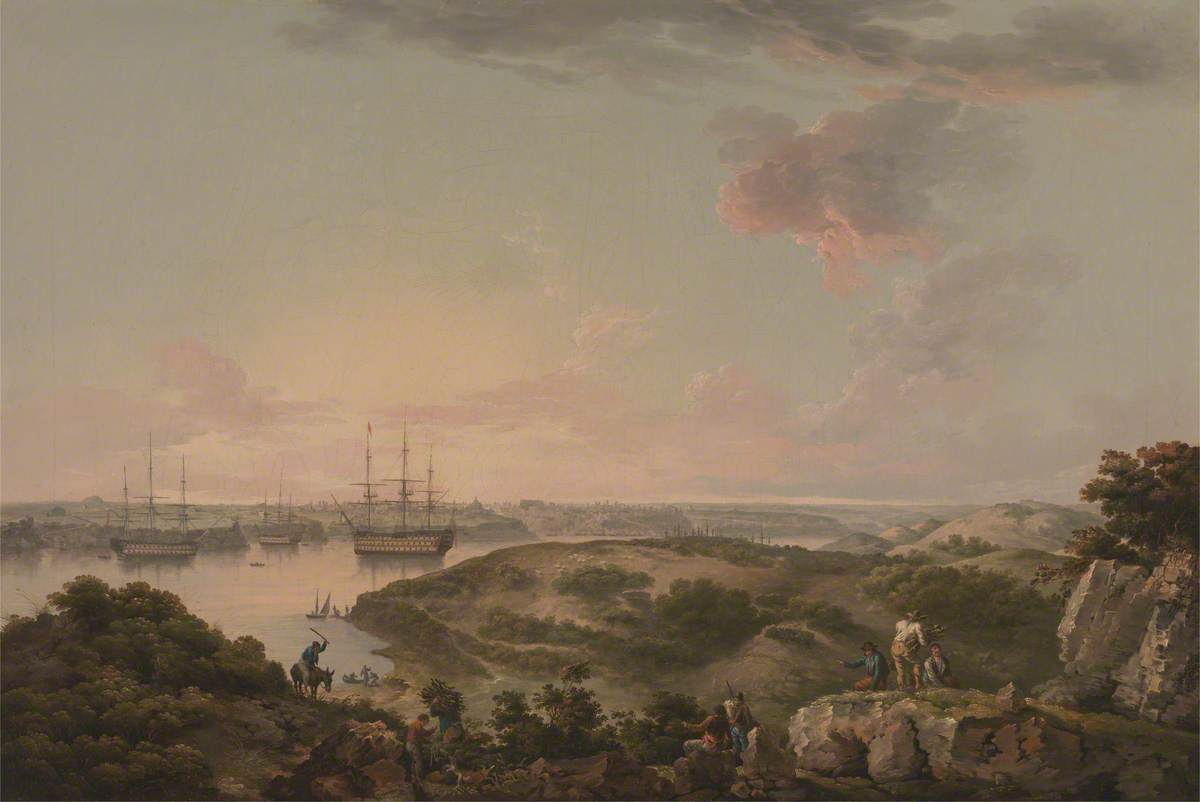
- Port Mahon c. 1795, by John Thomas Serres

Site information
- Operator: Royal Navy
- Controlled by: The Navy Board (1708-1802)

Site history
- In use: 1708-1802
- Fate: Now in use as a commercial port

Port Mahon Dockyard was a Royal Navy Dockyard located at Port Mahon, Menorca, Spain. It was opened in 1708 and in 1802 the port was ceded back to Spain. However a resident commissioner of the Royal Navy was still appointed as late as 1814. The dockyard was administered by the Navy Board and was part of the Mediterranean Fleet.

== History ==
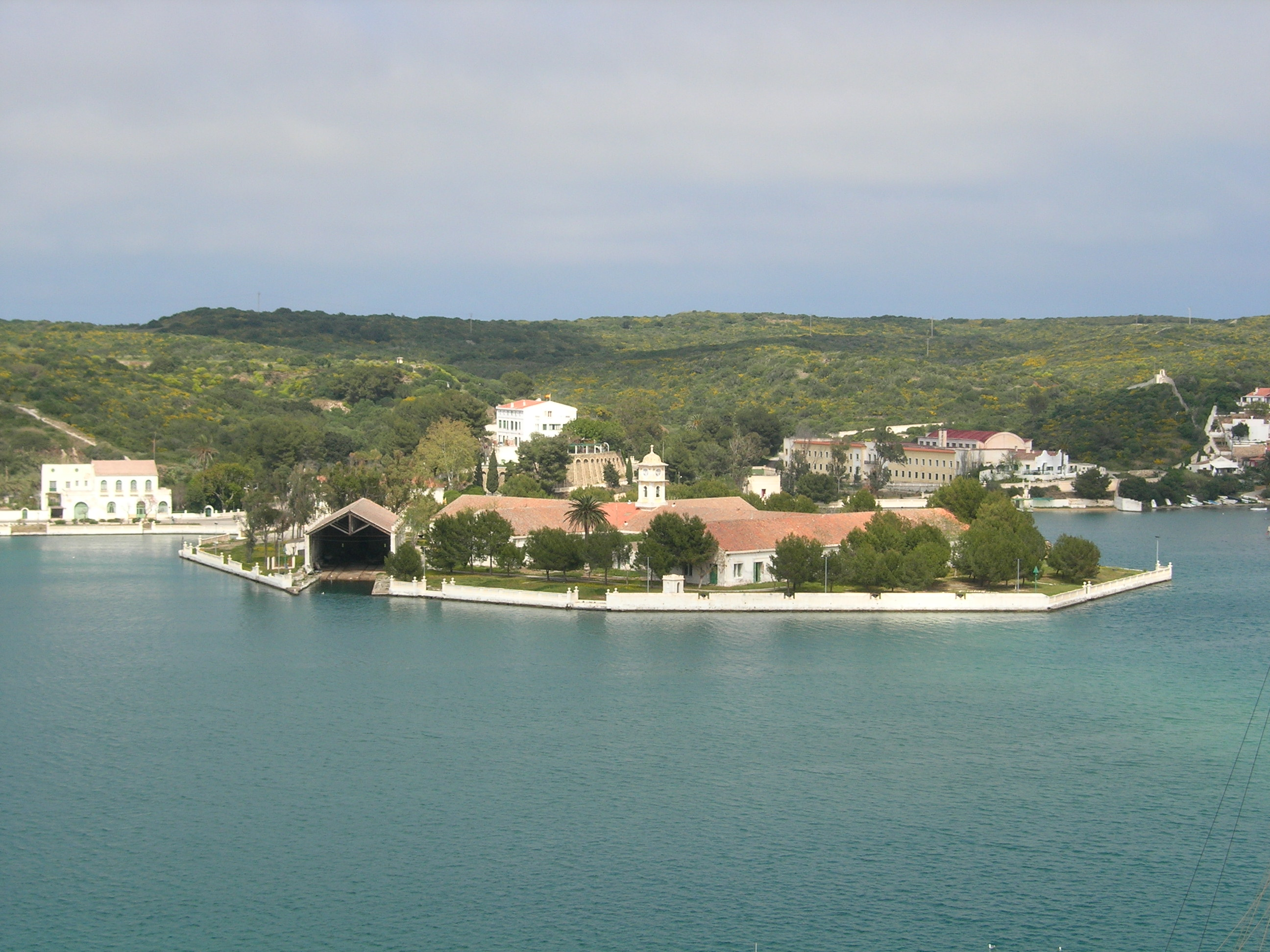
Naval storehouse and careening wharf on Illa Pinto.

The Port Mahon Dockyard was established at Port Mahon, one of the world's deepest natural harbours, in 1708, following orders issued by the Admiralty to Admiral Sir George Byng the Commander-in-Chief of the Mediterranean Squadron. He was instructed to develop the Port of Mahon as a naval base following the capture of Minorca. The dockyard was located on the north side of the harbour, opposite Port Mahon town. In 1756 control of the dockyard was fought over during the Battle of Minorca (1756). During the 1760s naval storehouses were constructed. The dockyard was the Royal Navy's principal Mediterranean base for much of the eighteenth century; however the territory changed hands more than once in that time, before being finally ceded to Spain in 1802.

The dockyard was administered by the Navy Board and was part of the Mediterranean Station.

== Administration of the dockyard and other key officials ==
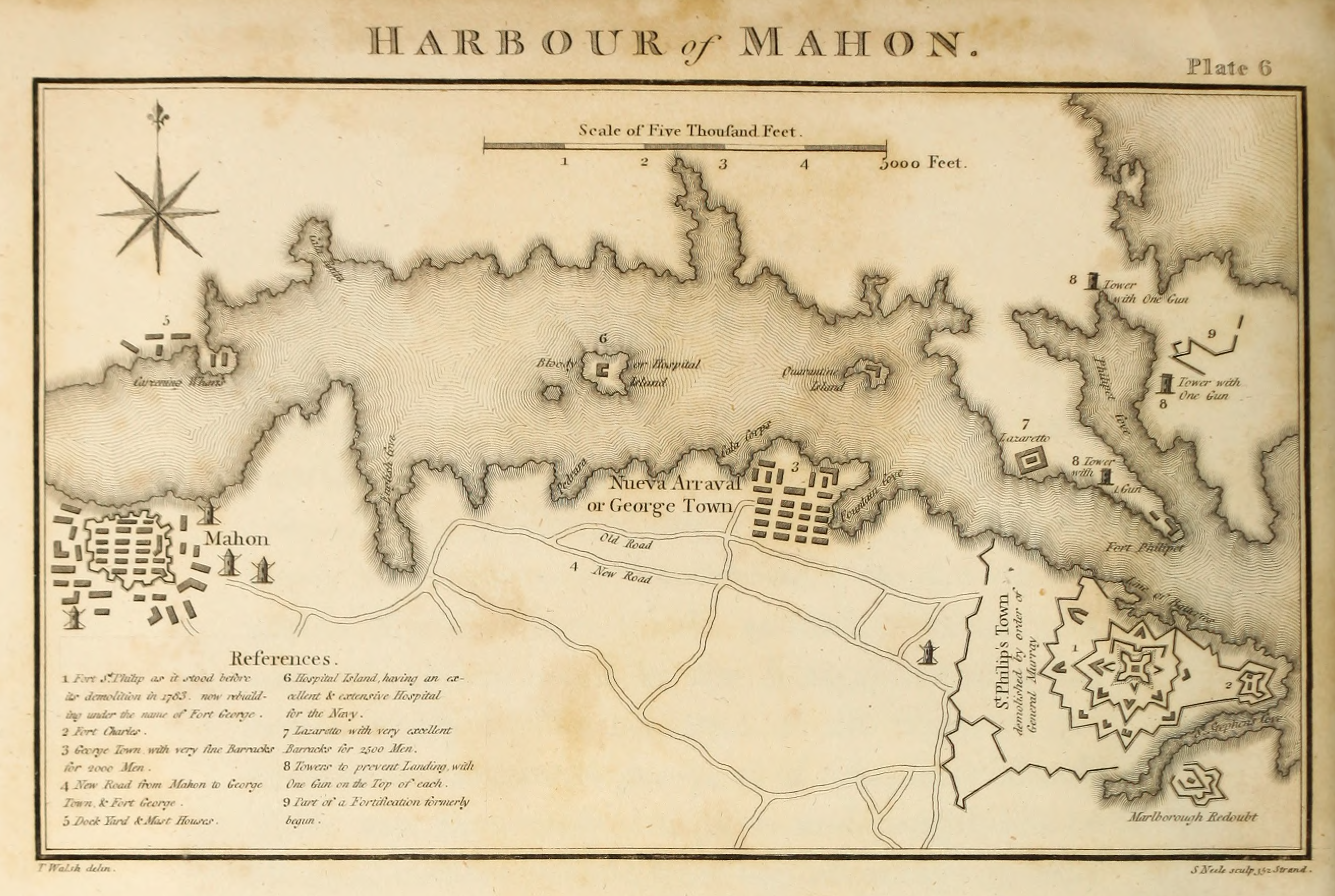
Map of the Harbour of Mahon in 1803

The Master Shipwright was the key official at the royal navy dockyards until the introduction of resident commissioners by the Navy Board after which he became deputy to the resident commissioner. In 1832 the post of commissioner was replaced by the post of superintendent.

=== Resident Commissioner of the Navy, Port Mahon ===
Post holders included:

1. 1742-1744, Commodore Edward Falkingham, (also resident commissioner of the navy for Gibraltar)
2. 1744-1747, Captain Thomas Trefusis, (ditto)
3. 1747-1756, Captain John Towry, (ditto)
4. 1756-1763, Captain Charles Colby, (ditto)
5. 1798, Captain Issac Coffin
6. 1814-1815, Captain Sir Jahleel Brenton (acting)

=== Naval Officer, Port Mahon ===
Post holders included:

1. 1727 Jun-Sep, Daniel Furzer
2. 1727-1728, John Cook
3. 1728-1731, Robert Hayes
4. 1731-1734, Robert Gother
5. 1734-1742, Thomas Sims
6. 1755-1756, Milbourne Marsh

=== Master Shipwright, Port Mahon ===
Post holders included:

1. 1711-1728, Cornelius Purnell
2. 1742-1760, John Varlo

=== Master Attendant, Port Mahon ===
Post holders included:

1. 1712-1720, Thomas Teddiman
2. 1742-1744, Michael Pinfold
3. 1744-1746, William Cumby
4. 1746-1755, Mathew Moriarty

=== Clerk of the Cheque, Port Mahon ===
Post holders included:

1. 1716-1718, George Atkins
2. 1718-1719, John Laton
3. 1719-1723, John Reynolds
4. 1738-1739, Christopher Robinson
5. 1739-1742, Francis Gregson
6. 1742-1748, Tyringham Stephens

=== Storekeeper, Port Mahon ===
Post holders included:

1. 1716 Jan-Sep, George Atkins
2. 1718-1719, John Laton
3. 1719-1723, John Reynolds
4. 1738-1739, Christopher Robinson
5. 1739-1746, Francis Gregson
6. 1746-1753, Thomas Foxworthy
7. 1763-1765, Milbourne Marsh
8. 1765 May-Nov, Milburn Warren
9. 1780, Christopher Hill Harris

== Ships built at the dockyard ==
The Sloop of war HMS Minorca was built at the dockyard in 1779. In 1798 the 18 gun brig sloop HMS Port Mahon was also constructed here.

1. HMS Minorca (1779)
2. HMS Port Mahon (1798)

== Sources ==
- Archives, National (1708–1802). "Royal Naval dockyard staff: Port Mahon Dockyard on Minorca". The National Archives. London, England.
- Baugh, Daniel A. (2015). "Overseas Bases". British Naval Administration in the Age of Walpole. Princeton, United States: Princeton University Press. ISBN 9781400874637.
- Clowes, Sir William Laird (1897–1903). The royal navy, a history from the earliest times to the present Volume III. London, England: S. Low Marston.
- Dickinson, H. T. (2008). A Companion to Eighteenth-Century Britain. Hoboken, New Jersey, United States: John Wiley & Sons. ISBN 9780470998878.
- Harrison, Simon, (2010-2018). https://threedecks.org/Port Mahon.
- Owen, John Hely (2010). War at Sea Under Queen Anne 1702-1708. Cambridge, England: Cambridge University Press. ISBN 9781108013383.
