= Ordonnateur =

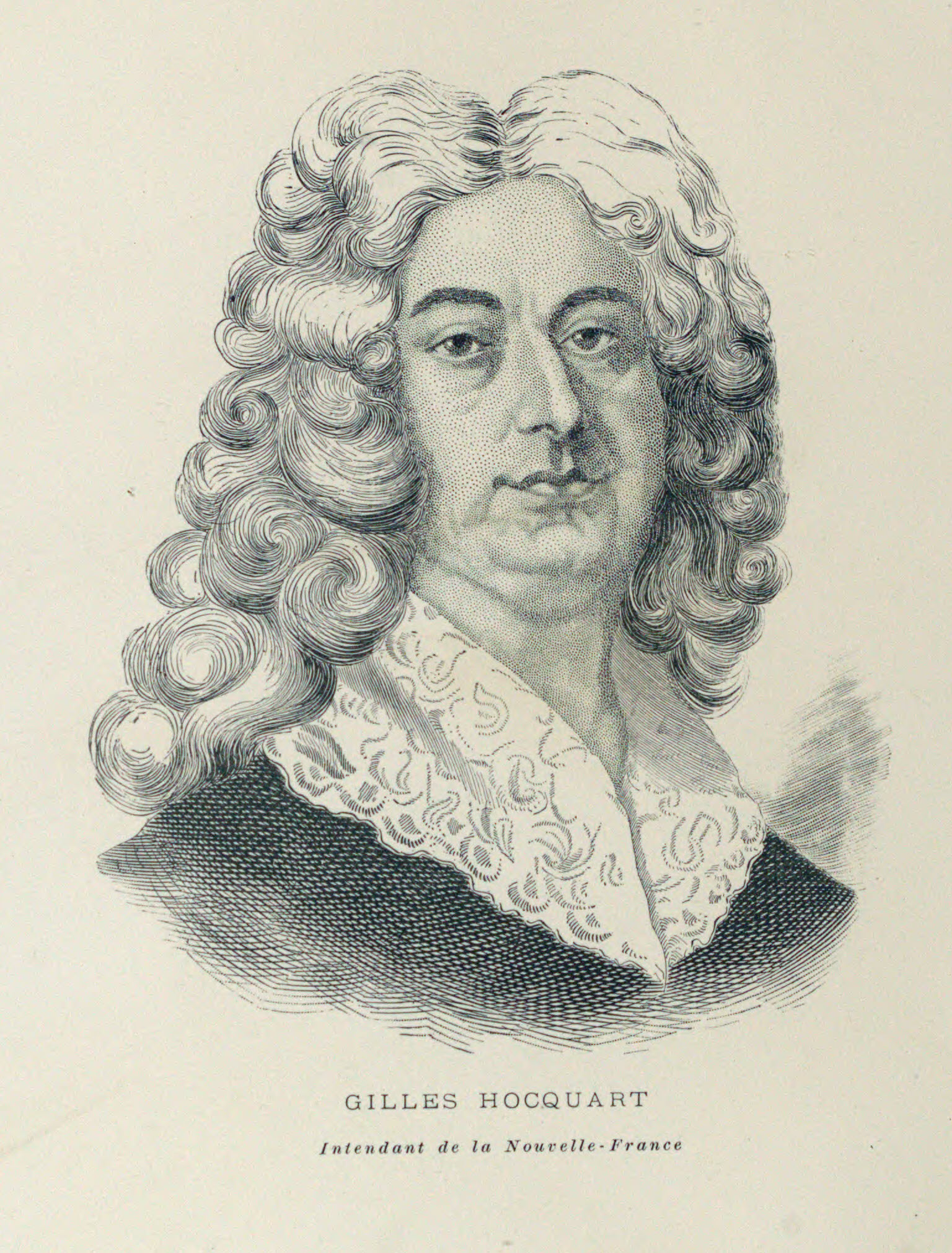
Gilles Hocquart, ordonnateur and later intendant of New France

An ordonnateur or commissaire-ordonnateur in the French colonial era was responsible for fiscal matters in a colony, as opposed to the governor, who was responsible for the military. The relationship between the two heads was often tense. Under modern public law, the ordonnateur (Authorizing Officer) is a French administrator who authorises collection of revenue and payment of expenses. Typically this is a government minister at the national level, a departmental prefect, the head of a local government or the executive in charge of a state institution such as a university or hospital. The function is separated by law from that of the comptable public ('public accountant'), who handles the money.

== Colonial era ==
From the late 17th century power in the French colonies was equally divided between a governor, responsible for the military, and an ordinnateur, responsible for finances. Typically the governor was a professional soldier and the ordinnateur was from the professional class of men of the robe. Usually they were commissioned naval commissaries, or officers of the pen. The position was based on the concept of the intendants who governed the provinces of France. It was also called commissaire-ordonnateur or premier conseilleur. The ordonnateurs had many of the powers of an intendant, but without the prestige of that title.

The ordonnateur had the authority to order treasurers to make payments on behalf of the government of the colony, but did not handle the money, and did not have authority over those who did. The ordonnateur in French Louisiana supervised royal properties, issued royal supplies, collected tariffs and taxes and was the first judge of the Superior Council of Louisiana. Separate areas of responsibility and authority between the governor and ordinnateur were defined, but there were often clashes in areas of overlap or ambiguity. For example, building fortifications would have both military and financial aspects, and it might be unclear who had ultimate authority over trade or justice.

=== Early office holders ===
Two intendents, one in New France and the other in the West Indies were responsible for civil administration between 1680 and 1718. In 1704 André Deslandes arrived in Saint-Domingue as the first ordonnateur of the colony, and in 1705 he established a Superior Council at Cap Français. Jean-Jacques Mithon de Senneville served as a commissary under Intendent Robert in Martinique from 1697, in 1708 became ordonnateur of Saint-Domingue, and on 9 August 1718 was named the first intendant of the Leeward Islands. In 1725 Jean-Baptiste Dubois-Duclos was named ordonnateur of Saint-Domingue, and in 1728 Gilles Hocquart was named ordonnateur of Canada. It was not until 1731 that he was named intendant. Paul Lefebvre d'Albon was commissaire-ordonnateur in Cayenne from 1712 to 1746. Charles Mesnier was commissaire-ordonnateur in Guadeloupe from 1723 to 1729. On Île-Royale Pierre-August de Soubras was commissaire-ordonnateur from 1714 to 1718, succeeded by Jacques-Sébastien Le Normant de Mézy from 1718 to 1731.

== Modern administration ==
=== Position ===
The functions of the ordonnateur in the public administration are defined by decree 2012-1246 of 7 November 2012, which also defines the functions of the comptable (accountant). The title applies to the heads of national and local government departments and public institutions such as hospitals, educational establishments and resource centers. Ordonnateurs are financial decision makers, and have sole authority to assess whether an expense should be incurred or a receipt is due. The role of ordonnateur is reserved for senior administrative and political authorities. At the national level the ministers are ordonnateurs, in local governments the local executive has this function, and generally the executive head of a public institution has the function.

There are two grades of ordonnateur in the public administration, primary and secondary. The ordonnateurs principaux have a directly assigned budget, which at the national level is assigned by parliament to each ministry. The ordonnateurs secondaires are delegated credits from the ordonnateurs principaux. Prefects are ordonnateurs secondaires of the state. There are no ordonnateurs secondaires at the local level. Ordonnateurs at both levels may delegate their signing authority, but remain responsible for the acts of their delegates.

=== Functions ===
Ordonnateurs authorise collection of revenue and payment of expenses. They determine rights and obligations, clear receipts, issue invoices and authorize expenses and credits where appropriate. They transmit orders to pay or collect to the competent comptable. Spending operations include commitment, liquidation and authorization. Commitment is the act by which the public body creates or discovers an obligation that will result in a charge, which should normally by settled from the approved budget. Liquidation verifies that an amount is payable and the appropriate documents have been submitted. Scheduling authorises payment by the accountant. The ordonnateur also sends the comptable orders for collection of payments such as rentals, fines and other non-tax revenue. Taxes are collected by separate authorities.

=== Relationship to comptable ===
The comptable (accountant) handles the funds and keeps the accounts. Usually they are a Public Treasury official appointed by the Ministry of Budget and Finance. Between them the two officials have full control over the budget. The functions cannot be combined. The ordonnateur cannot handle public money because it would "burn their fingers." By separating the functions of authorization and payment or receipt there is greater control and less temptation to deviate from the rules. To ensure full separation, the comptable is not subordinate to the ordonnateur, and is ineligible for local election.

== Sources ==
- Dawdy, Shannon Lee (2008-09-15), Building the Devil's Empire: French Colonial New Orleans, University of Chicago Press, ISBN 978-0-226-13843-5
- Décret n° 2012-1246 du 7 novembre 2012 relatif à la gestion budgétaire et comptable publique (in French), Legifrance, 3 August 2018
- Fausser, Dominique (1 August 2002), La séparation entre ordonnateur et comptable (ou l'exécution des budgets publics) Extrait des cours au CNFPT (in French), CNFPT
- MacDonald, David (2016-02-24), Lives of Fort de Chartres: Commandants, Soldiers, and Civilians in French Illinois, 1720–1770, SIU Press, ISBN 978-0-8093-3460-5
- Pritchard, James S. (2004-01-22), In Search of Empire: The French in the Americas, 1670-1730, Cambridge University Press, ISBN 978-0-521-82742-3
- "Qu'est-ce que la séparation des ordonnateurs et des comptables ?", Vie publique (in French), Direction de l'Information Légale et Administrative, 31 October 2017
- "Qui sont les ordonnateurs ?", Vie publique (in French), Direction de l'Information Légale et Administrative, 31 October 2017
