= Gilles Hocquart =

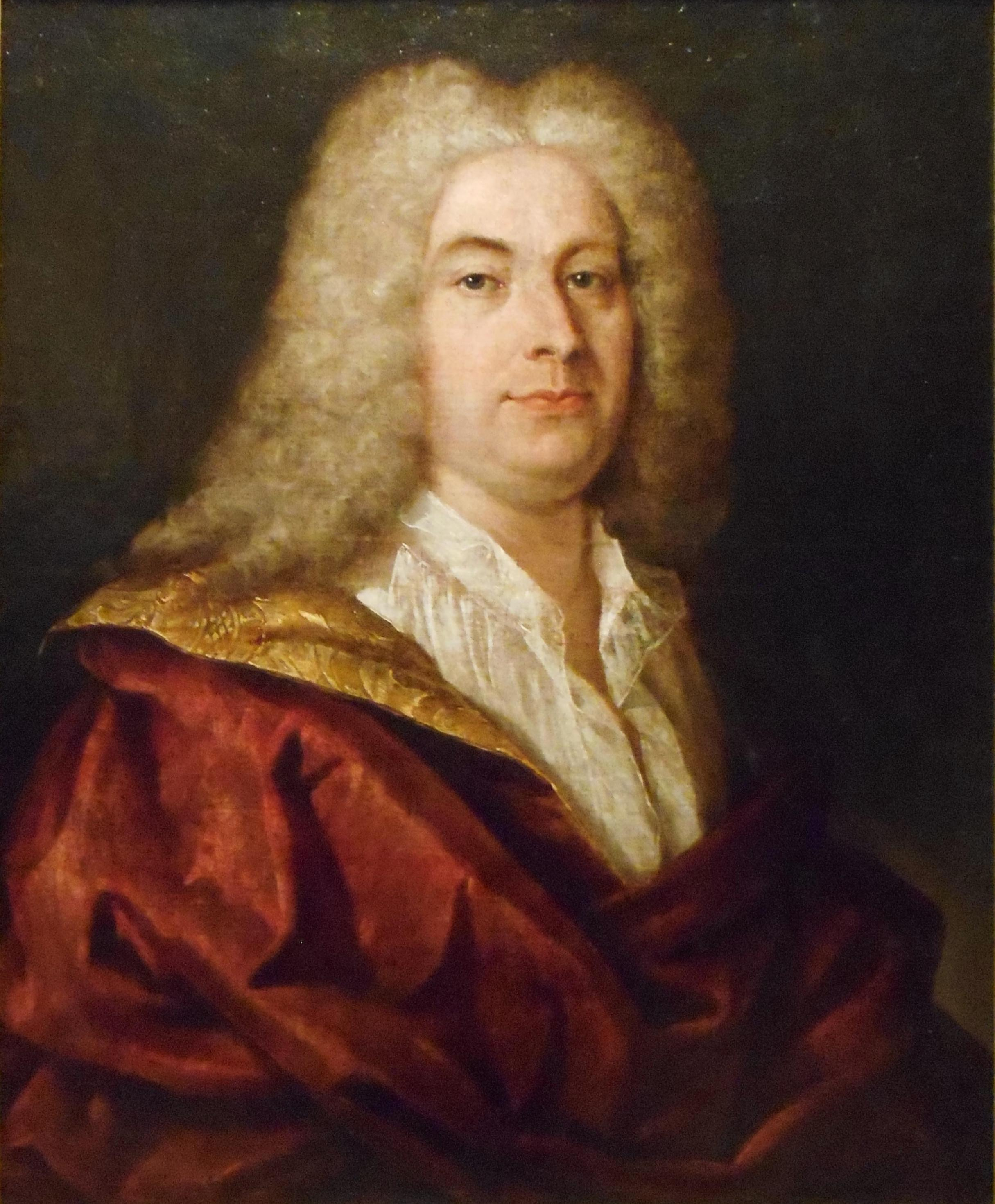
- Gilles Hocquart by Théophile Hamel
- Born: 1694 (age 332); Mortagne-au-Perche
- Died: 1 April 1783 (aged 88–89); Paris
- Occupation: Intendant of New France
- Spouse: Anne-Catherine de La Lande
- Parent(s): Jean-Hyacinthe Hocquart (Father) & Marie-Françoise Michelet du Cosnier (Mother)

Gilles Hocquart was born in 1694, in Sainte-Croix, Mortagne-au-Perche to Jean-Hyacinthe Hocquart. From September, 1729 to August, 1748, Hocquart served as Intendant of New France. Hocquart put his faith in the Canadian bourgeoisie as the main player in the development of a profitable economy for the colony. Although his ideas were grand, he did not recognize the flaws that were already impeding the economy at a smaller scale. After a few rentable years, New France's fragile economy began to crumble, and by the end of his contract, Hocquart was held responsible for too many extraordinary expenses. He was called home and replaced by Francois Bigot. Nonetheless, the years between 1737 and 1741 were among the most prosperous in the history of New France.

== Early life ==
There is an unfortunate lack of materials regarding Hocquart's personal history. What little sources remain are mostly professional exchanges between various officials, making it difficult to understand the man behind the intendant.

We do know that Hocquart's family came from the provincial nobility. Gilles Hocquart was born in the parish of Sainte-Croix, Mortagne, Perche in 1694. His official date of birth remains a mystery. His young adult years were spent in school, preparing for his ultimate goal: to follow in his father Jean-Hyacinthe's footsteps. In 1723, at 29 years old, Hocquart arrived at the Marine commissariat at Rochefort, where he remained until his appointment to New France in 1729. In 1725, now aged 31, Hocquart took on the position of Port controller permanently, which made him a financial officer with broad responsibilities including finances and material resources at Rochefort. These responsibilities were of the utmost importance. So much so, in fact, that by 1728, he was "second in authority to Beauharnois." Therefore, Hocquart found himself in a very favorable place for a promotion to a colonial intendancy.

At the time, Jean Frédéric Phélypeaux, comte de Maurepas, was the State Secretary of Navy in charge of colonial intendants. In the case of New France, Maurepas wanted "a more obedient, down-to-earth and efficient man with whom to replace Claude-Thomas Dupuy," the intendant from 1725 to 1728. On March 8, 1729, Maurepas formally commissioned Hocquart to perform the functions of Intendant in remote New France as commissaire-ordonnateur, a rank below that of Intendant. This measure was adopted to give Hocquart a trial period of two years. Indeed, two years later, Hocquart would be promoted to the full rank of Intendant in March 1731.

== Formation ==
During his long stay at Rochefort, Hocquart received a lengthy training which prepared him to handle most of the bureaucratic functions of a colonial Intendant. However, he possessed only a "rudimentary grasp of the kind of productive economic infrastructure that was needed to spawn commercial prosperity" in New France. This lack of understanding led Hocquart to believe that "the commercial bourgeois' capital was the key to both the expansion of trade and to the diversification of commercial enterprise." This belief would prove costly; although some industries like fishery and private shipbuilding were greatly enhanced by Hocquart's' financial support, most of the economy suffered from a lack of organization.

That is not to say that Hocquart failed completely. In other sectors of administration, Hocquart proved very effective. According to Horton, Hocquart was a practical individual who acted in accordance with views distilled from observation and experience. Many of his contemporaries in Canada considered him level-headed and cooperative. Maurepas noted that Hocquart, unlike several of his predecessors, made "virtually no suggestions for constitutional reforms designed to redistribute government power in his favour." Moreover, it was found that, though "flexible in his methods, Hocquart possessed the sort of narrow, dogged intelligence that is often better suited to carrying out policies than to formulating them." His attitude was as easy-going as could be. The long period of administrative harmony that prevailed between him and Governor Beauharnois during the 1730s is proof that Hocquart was eager to cooperate, rather than stir up animosity.

Hocquart, like many intendants before him, saw "Canadian intendancy as a stepping stone to greater position and wealth." As such, he always expected to go home to France once his service was over. In other words, although he invested quite a lot in New France, Hocquart never considered it his home.

== Intendant in New France ==
As intendant, Hocquart served as president of the highest court in Canada, the Superior Council. Naturally, he was responsible for the maintenance of public order. However, Hocquart had a different way to go about it. Horton notes that Hocquart was more practical than his predecessor, therefore also more reluctant to propose changes before familiarizing himself on a first-hand basis with Canadian conditions. Hocquart was also given authority to investigate the conduct of all the financial officials in New France. Although he held many powers, Hocquart tried to remain on amiable terms with his contemporaries, notably Governor Beauharnois, by respecting both their boundaries. This attitude helped both men to share a long and positive relation. But, over time, Hocquart's interests led him to interfere in the affairs of Beauharnois. By the late 1730s, relations between Hocquart and Beauharnois began to crumble.

== Land Distribution and Agriculture ==
Hoquart's immediate predecessors, Michel Bégon and Claude-Thomas Dupuy, had failed miserably at convincing the habitants to clear new concessions and the seigneurs to settle new tenants. This procedure was essential for the development of agriculture. Hocquart was initially very successful in this venture, as dispatches to the Minister show that from 1731 to 1732, reunion of concessions doubled; in only one year, the number of concessions went from 200 to 400. But numerous concessions meant nothing if they could not be settled by enough families to work the land. Plus, it was "much harder for seigneurs whose fiefs were far from the towns to attract tenants." In 1731, to encourage settlement and to tie all of New France's agricultural regions more closely to the town markets, Hocquart initiated a major road-building program. Completed in 1737, the road between Quebec and Montreal reduced travel time from as much as a month by river barge, to just four-and-a-half days.

Still, agriculture was not picking up. The habitants, even those in the well developed areas, seldom cleared more than a third of their land and most were satisfied with raising enough grain and vegetables for their families alone. So, Hocquart issued other ordinances which were aimed at regulating the habitant's life more closely in the hope of making him a more productive farmer.

Hocquart was also responsible for new settlements projects along with Governor Beauharnois. Together, they prepared Proposals, in which they argued whether certain projects could be deemed advantageous for both the King and the growth of the colony.

== Economy ==
As Intendant of New France, Hocquart was charged with "moulding the Canadian economy into a flourishing extension of the French imperial economy by increasing its capacity to supply the metropolis and other French colonies with materials they required while expanding the Canadian market for French goods." On the one hand, Hocquart was to develop the shipbuilding industry so that ships capable of trading with the West Indies could be built. On the other hand, there was the matter of the fur trade. According to Horton, the fur trade was pictured as a major factor behind the slow development of agriculture and industry, because "its profits, rapid returns and simple barter transactions, were more attractive than the comparatively long-term risks of more sophisticated enterprises." In short, Hocquart was expected to shift the axis of Canada's commercial economy from the fur trade to agriculture and industry. He was to do so, moreover, without increasing state expenditures, since Dupuy had already incurred major expenses. Unfortunately for Hocquart, his instructions offered little in the way of concrete suggestions. Hocquart would have to figure things out on his own.

The main concern of his instructions regarded the fur trade. Indeed, while French officials recognized that the fur trade was still the linchpin of Canadian commerce, they were concerned about its negative impact on the non-fur economy which they were convinced would be the colony's mainstay in the future. Rightly so, because in a matter of only 7 years, trade income rapidly decreased. On March 22, 1729, Hocquart wrote to king Louis XV to inform him that "the trade done last year at the Forts Frontenac and Niagara have increased of two-thirds over preceding years," and accounted this augmentation to the better, recent administration. However, on October 12, 1736, Hocquart was faced with an entirely different situation: in his own words, the "trade done at Fort Frontenac and Niagara was becoming from year to year a smaller business." It was becoming increasingly clear that New France needed a new economic venture.

Hocquart's mandate clearly instructed him to act in favor of the French economy. However, in 1731, he began to distinguish the sharp divide between Canadian and French merchant interests in New France. Surprisingly, Hocquart increasingly saw himself as the supporter and protector of the Canadians. Although he did not consider New France his home, he could still see that those who did live in the colony, namely the Canadians, would need help if they were to ever create a strong and prosperous economy. Hocquart understood that his help would be required in order to stimulate industrial enterprise.

A good example of Hocquart's "favoritism" of Canadian merchants is the illegal fur trade. Upon arrival in New France, "he was determined to suppress the illegal trade." But after 1731, Hocquart claimed that this was an unfeasible endeavour, since "the geographic considerations alone made it impossible to patrol all of the illegal trade routes effectively." This sudden change of heart can best explained by the profits generated by this trade for Canadian merchants.

In the long run, Hocquart did little to advance the Canadian overall economy. With the exception of the fisheries and small-scale shipbuilding, none of the private industries launched during the period between 1733 and 1736 showed signs of growth into a major enterprise. The main factor for Hocquart's lack of success was his growing ambition to nurture large enterprises. He simply ignored the apparent absence of an economic infrastructure to support these large enterprises. And for Hocquart to conclude that big industries would succeed where small ones had failed was preposterous. Another factor that hindered the development of a fully diversified commercial economy, was that New France simply did not possess the manpower to sustain such enterprises.

The ensuing years, from 1737 to 1741, were among the most prosperous in the history of New France. This was due almost entirely to a rise in exports; despite a slight decline in the regular fur trade, these setbacks were more than redressed by the steady growth of agricultural commerce and by the spectacular growth of industry, in this case of fisheries and shipbuilding. Thus, Hocquart might not have succeeded in creating the large enterprises he had imagined, but his input in Canadian affairs accounted for the most prosperous period in the history of New France up to date.

== Collapse ==
By 1743, members of the Canadian economy were no longer capable of launching or sustaining private initiatives. Their most important industrial ventures had either disappeared or were taken over by the state, while the agricultural commerce had sputtered almost to a standstill. Hocquart had originally convinced Maurepas that, with initial support from the state, these ventures could succeed in developing private export industries. But the bankruptcy of the Saint-Maurice Company in 1741, the collapse of private shipbuilding in 1743, and the failure of copper, tile, lumbering and rope-making industries between those dates demonstrated that Hocquart had put too much confidence in the private sector. All these failures could be attributed to poor management, crop failures, and lack of market opportunities. Thus, except for the fisheries and some intermittent shipments of lumber to France and to Louisbourg, there were no private export industries operating in New France by 1743. A crisis was inevitable and, when it occurred, Hocquart possessed neither the credit nor the firm government presence in the countryside that might have permitted him to alleviate some of its worst effects. In the end, the state was forced to help save the colony. These developments had serious repercussions for Hocquart's financial administration. Nevertheless, Hocquart continued to channel most of the benefits from government expenditures in the colony to Canadian merchants, which angered his fellow officials, like Governor Beauharnois.

Finally, the War of the Austrian Succession, from 1744 to 1748, crushed whatever hopes Hocquart entertained of revitalizing his private industries policy. The war made any concrete exports or imports almost insignificant. The capture of Louisbourg also had a negative impact on the Canadian fisheries. This, in turn, sealed the fate of Quebec's private shipbuilding industry. The fur trade was also greatly affected, since the supply of goods was nearly cut off during the war. Thankfully, trade continued along the illegal trade routes. But by 1746, Iroquois were no longer neutral, and Mohawks had declared war on the French and blocked the illegal trade route, thus impeding the fur trade. Moreover, the war led to large state expenditures on the war effort: fortifications, garrisons, and artillery were commissioned by the numbers. According to Maurepas, the Canadian expenditures had thrown Marine finances into chaos and had added to its already huge debt. He stated unequivocally that Hocquart's future in the king's service depended on his finding some way to reduce these expenditures.

== Return to France ==
The decision to replace Hocquart as intendant was made sometime before he himself formally requested to retire from Canada in autumn of 1746. Hocquart came under increasing pressure from French officials to account for the prodigious expenditures in Canada and it may have been because of them that he was recalled in 1748.

In any case, Hocquart returned to France in November 1748. Then began the most successful phase of his lengthy naval career. In early 1749, Hocquart moved to Brest as a commissaire, and as soon as April 1 of the same year, he was appointed intendant.

On August 23, 1750, he married Anne-Catherine de La Lande, at Brest. Throughout the 1750s, he outfitted war vessels bound for Canada because of his experience with state shipbuilding at Quebec.

Gilles Hocquart died, at age 89, on April 1, 1783, after a long and eventful career.

In Canada he owned 6 slaves; 5 from First Nations and 1 from Africa.

== See also ==
- Gilles Hocquart Building
