= Marion Veitch =

Scottish diarist (1639–1722)

- Born: Marion Fairlie; 1639; Edinburgh
- Died: 9 May 1722 (aged 82–83); Dumfries
- Known for: her memoirs
- Spouse: William Veitch
- Children: Samuel Vetch
- Parent(s): James Fairlie; Euphan Kincaid

Marion Veitch born Marion Fairlie (1639 – 9 May 1722) was a Scottish Presbyterian memoirist who at times was exiled by her family's religion before the Glorious Revolution.

== Life ==
Marion Fairlie was born in Edinburgh and baptised at the end of 1639. Her parents were the shoemaker James Fairlie and Euphan Kincaid Fairlie. In 1664 she married in the High Kirk of Lanark, William Veitch, who was a minister. They were Presbyterian and their lives were made difficult. At times they lived outside Scotland and at times they lived apart. Irrespective they had ten children including Samuel Vetch who went on to be Governor of Nova Scotia. She spent five years at Hanham Hall and her time living in Newcastle was only brought to an end in 1688 by the Glorious Revolution in Scotland. She and her husband were allowed to return to Scotland. In 1690, her husband became a minister at Peebles. They moved to Dumfries in 1694, where they both died in May 1722, within a day of each other.

(While some sources such as the Dictionary of National Biography state "she died a day after her husband," their gravestone states she "predeceased him by one day.")

== Legacy ==
The Free Church of Scotland published her memoirs in 1846. Unlike her husband's memoir, hers included an account of the death of four of her children to the will of God.
