= William Veitch (minister) =

Scottish Presbyterian minister (1640–1722)

William Veitch [alias: William Johnston] [alias: George Johnston]

Personal details
- Born: 27 April 1640 Roberton
- Died: 8 May 1722 Dumfries
- Denomination: Protestant
- Education: University of Glasgow

William Veitch (27 April 1640 – 8 May 1722) was a Christian preacher in Scotland. A supporter of the Scottish Reformation, he refused to follow the episcopal church of the king of England, and preached as a Covenanter. As a result, he faced harassment from the authorities and lived abroad for several years.

== Early life ==
William Veitch (1640–1722) was a covenanter. He was born on 27 April 1640, the younger son of John Veitch, the minister of Roberton, Lanarkshire.

He studied at the University of Glasgow, where he graduated with an M.A. in 1659. In 1660 he became tutor to the family of Sir Andrew Ker of Greenhead at the University of Edinburgh. About 1664 he took license as a preacher and joined the Presbyterians.

His job was forfeited in 1667 after he took part in the Battle of Mauchline Muir and the Pentland Rising, he escaped to Newcastle, England, where he lived under the name of Johnson. For some time he was chaplain to the wife of the mayor of Newcastle; and, after preaching in London and other places, he was in 1671 ordained minister of a meeting-house at Faldlees and afterwards at Hanamhall in the parish of Rothbury, Northumberland, whence four years afterwards he removed to Seaton Hall in the parish of Longhorsly.

On 16 January 1679 he was apprehended, while living there under the name of Johnson, but having been on 22 February sisted before the committee of public affairs in Edinburgh, he was sent to imprisonment on the Bass Rock.

== Imprisonment on the Bass Rock ==
James Anderson in his "Martyrs of the Bass" casts doubt that the sentence was executed. He says:

"With respect to Mr William Veitch, although the Privy Council, on the 25th of February 1679, "approved the report of the Committee for Public Affairs that he be sent to the Bass," and, on the 11th of March, appointed him to be conveyed to that prison, yet this act was not executed; for, in an order of the 18th of that month, requiring the King's Advocate to proceed against him before the Justiciary Court, he is represented as "prisoner in the tolbooth of Edinburgh."(Wodrow's History, vol. iii. pp. 7, 8.) Had Veitch been a prisoner in the Bass, such a fact would undoubtedly have been recorded in his Memoirs of Himself, in which he describes so minutely the public sufferings he endured in the cause of Presbytery. But in that document, no reference to any such thing is to be found."

== Later life ==
He was released from Bass Rock on 17 July 1680, and returned to Newcastle.

He aided Archibald, Earl of Argyll, in his escape from Scotland in 1681. In 1683 he went to Holland, and in 1685 he was again in Northumberland acting as an agent on behalf of Monmouth. Soon afterwards he was settled as minister of a meeting-house at Beverley, Yorkshire.

Having returned to Scotland, he was called to Whitton Hall, Morebattle, April 1688. In 1690 he was minister of Peebles, and in September 1694, he was admitted to Dumfries. In 1705 he presented to the church two communion cups. He demitted on 19 May 1715.

He died on 8 May 1722.

== Family ==
William's father John and brothers James and John were also ministers.

On 23 November 1664, he married Marion Fairley, of the family of Braid, Edinburgh. Marion Veitch was the author of a diary which was published by the Free Church of Scotland in 1846. She died the day before (Scott says the day after) her husband, and was buried in the same grave within the church of Dumfries. They had several children;

- William, educated at Utrecht, entered the army of the Prince of Orange, captain in the Darien Expedition, died at sea, off Port Royal, Jamaica, 1699;
- Samuel (who adopted the spelling Vetch for his surname), first Governor of Nova Scotia, born 1668, died 30 April 1732;
- Ebenezer, minister of Ayr;
- Elizabeth (married 7 June 1710, David M'Culloch of Ardwall);
- Sarah, born 7 November 1677 (married James Young of Gully-hill, Holywood);
- Agnes (married John Somerville, minister of Caerlaverock);
- Janet, buried 27 March 1693;
- and three others, who died young.

== Works ==
He was the author of:

- Two Sermons preached before Her Majesty's Commons at the Opening of Parliament (Edinburgh, 1693)
- Two Sermons preached before the commission (Edinburgh, 1695)
- A Short History of Rome's Designs against the Protestant Interest in Britain (Drumfries, 1718)
- A Short Answer to a Letter pretendedly written by Mr John Hepburn, Division Maker, but really by Riddough and Hunter and other Romish Emissaries, who are Defenders of his Faith, both Summer and Winter (Dumfries, 1720)
- A portrait of Veitch is in the possession of his descendant, E. Denholm Young, W.S., Edinburgh

== Bibliography ==
- Paton's The Book of St Michael's Church
