= Étienne Jacob =

Canadian court officer and judge

Étienne Jacob (c. 1648 – 1726) was a court officer in New France, sergeant of the Sovereign Council of New France, seigneurial notary and a judge of the bailiff's court of Beaupré and Île d'Orléans.
