= Charles Hobby =

Canadian politician

Sir Charles Hobby
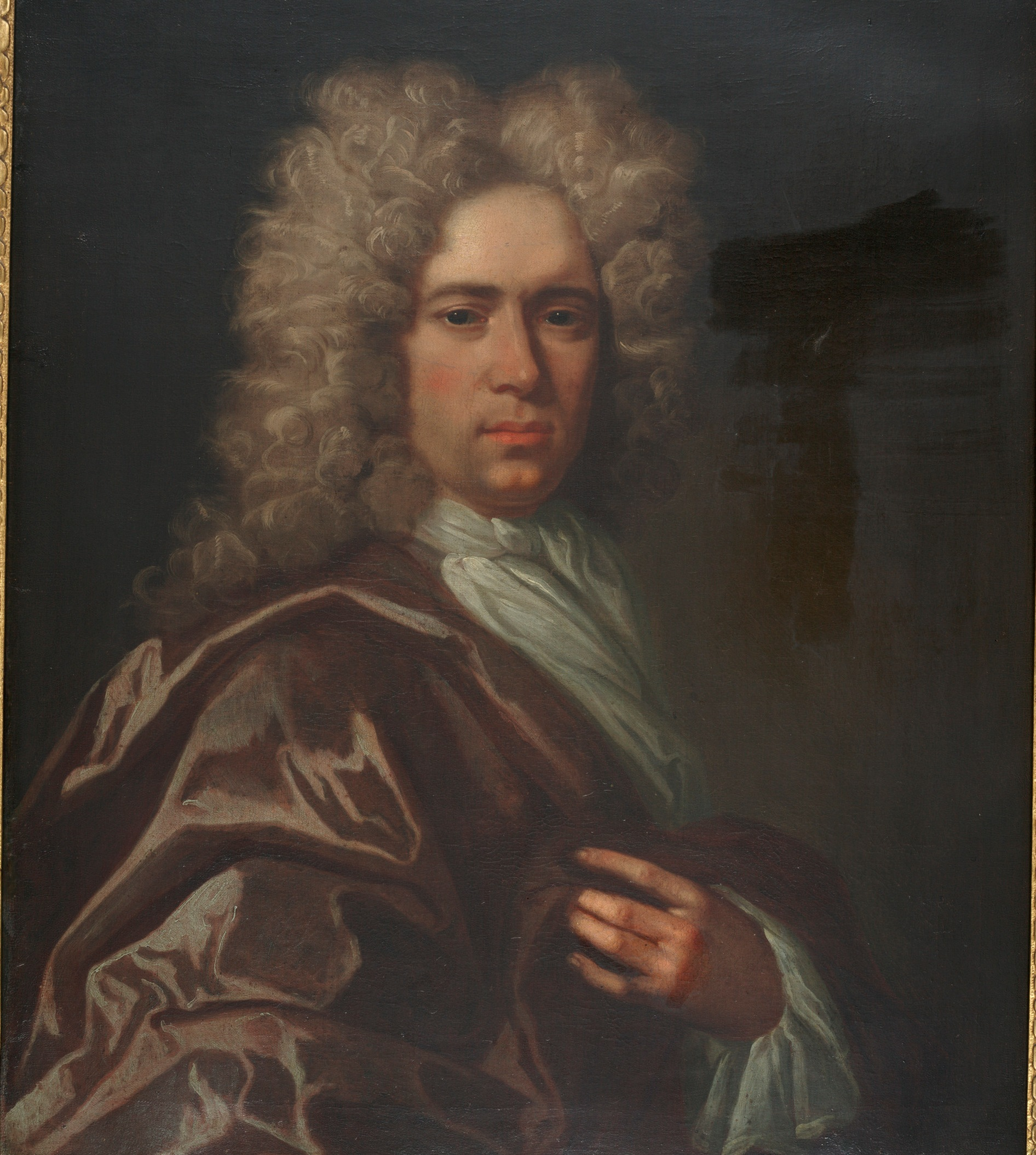
- Born: 1665; Boston, Massachusetts
- Died: 1715 (aged 49–50); London, England
- Occupation: Merchant
- Years active: 1700-1715
- Known for: Commanding a regiment during the siege of Port Royal 1710. Acting governor of Annapolis Royal in 1711.
- Spouse: Elizabeth Coleman
- Awards: Knighted 1705

Sir Charles Hobby (1665–1715) was a Boston merchant and militia colonel, commanding a provincial regiment during the siege of Port Royal 1710, and serving as its acting governor in 1711. He was knighted in 1705.

== Biography ==
Hobby was the son of a wealthy Boston merchant. He lived in Jamaica from before 1692 until 1700, when he returned to Boston beginning a commercial career. In 1705 he was knighted for bravery during an earthquake on the island. The real reason was, according to Thomas Hutchinson, a consideration of £800. Hobby's wealth and connections made him a captain of the Ancient and Honorable Artillery Company and a colonel of a regiment of Massachusetts militia. Anglican in religion, Hobby was a vestryman of the King's Chapel, together with Governor Joseph Dudley and Captain Cyprian Southack. He was churchwarden in 1713 and 1714. Hobby was nevertheless known as a rake, and of a living that not recommended itself to the puritan minds of Boston. At his death, he owned six slaves.

In Boston, Hobby was involved in a dispute with Governor Dudley. Taking his complaint to the authorities in London, he became the spokesman of different groups wishing to remove to governor from office. In spite of his high living, he was recommended both by Increase and Cotton Mather. Staying in London until 1708, he made connections with Francis Nicholson and his former antagonist Samuel Vetch. Dropping his case against Dudley, he returned to Boston.

During the expedition to Port Royal in 1710, Hobby commanded Hobby's Regiment, a Massachusetts provincial regiment raised in Boston. During the absence of the governor, Samuel Vetch, during the Quebec Expedition 1711, Hobby was acting governor of Annapolis Royal. Returning to Boston the same year, Hobby continued his mercantile activities, investing in Nova Scotia property and trade. He tried to wrest the governorship of that colony from Vetch; again proceeding to London, and yet again making peace with his antagonist, and was recommended as lieutenant governor. Hobby died in London in 1715, leaving a bankrupt estate.

== Notes ==
Political offices
New office	Lieutenant Governor of Nova Scotia; June–October 1711; Served under: Samuel Vetch	Succeeded by Thomas Caulfeild
