= Jean-Baptiste de La Brosse =

Jean-Baptiste de La Brosse (April 30, 1724 – April 11, 1782) was a well-educated priest from the Charente département, in the administrative region of Nouvelle-Aquitaine, central-western France. His Jesuit training included a third year of philosophy and four years of theology. He was ordained a priest in 1753 and came to Canada the following year.

== Career ==
His missionary work began almost immediately in Acadia, where he worked with the displaced natives of the region. The Abenakis, Maliseet, and Acadians were being hunted by the British and he encouraged them to flee. He was considered the "missionary to the Abenakis" and in 1760 completed a basic dictionary of the Abenaki language.

His greatest missionary work took place with the Innu people who were speakers of the Montagnais language. These people were located in modern-day Labrador and Quebec. He worked tirelessly with them; teaching them to read and write and attempting to protect them from the alcohol promoted by the traders of the region.

An examination of his work in Canada reveals his ability as a scholar and professor. He did extensive work in producing dictionaries, grammars and spellers for the native languages of his people. He built on work done by his colleagues and furthered their studies.

== Death ==
La Brosse died at Tadoussac, Quebec.
