= Richard Philipps =

British army officer and colonial administrator (1661–1750)

Lieutenant-General Richard Philipps
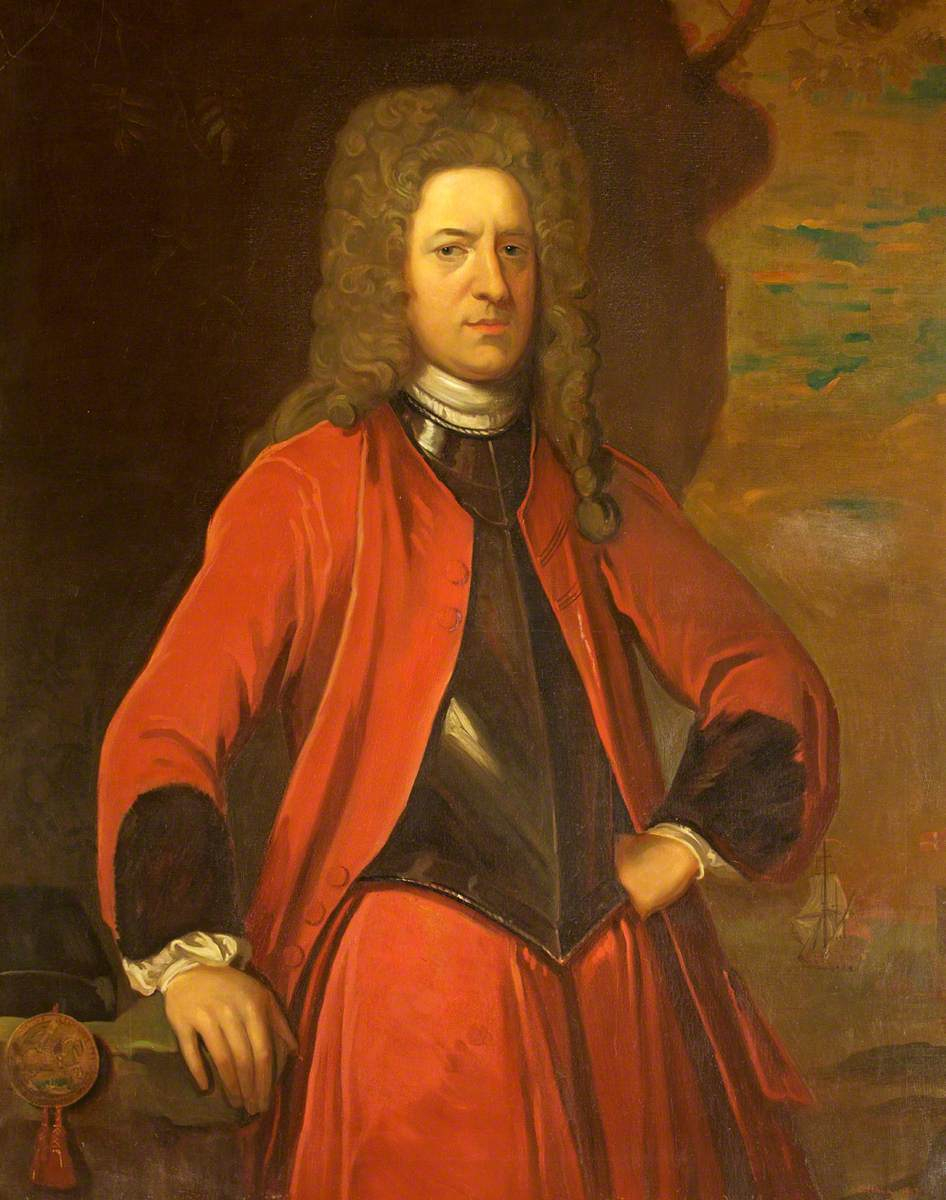
- Portrait by Caroline Hall, 1717

Governor of Nova Scotia
- In office 1717–1749
- Monarch: George I

Personal details
- Born: c. 1661
- Died: 14 October 1750

Military service
- Allegiance: England; Great Britain
- Branch/service: English Army; British Army
- Rank: Lieutenant-General
- Battles/wars: Battle of the Boyne

Lieutenant-General Richard Philipps (c. 1661 – 14 October 1750) was a British army officer and colonial administrator. He is said to have been in the employ of William III as a young man and for his service gained the rank of captain in the English Army. He served at the Battle of the Boyne in 1690 and promoted to Lieutenant Colonel in 1712.

He raised the 40th Regiment of Foot in August 1717. In 1717 he was appointed Governor of Nova Scotia by George I. He arrived in Annapolis Royal in 1720, created the Nova Scotia Council and in 1722 returned to England. He made another visit to Nova Scotia and persuaded the Acadian French to swear allegiance to the British Government. He returned again to England about 1731. During the early years he evidently was an active and responsible governor. After 1731 his interest in the province was much reduced. Because of absences and laterally, waning interest, the roles of those acting for the Governor were greatly enhanced. They were: John Doucett, (1717–1725); Lawrence Armstrong, (1725–1739); Alexander Cosby, 1739–1740; Paul Mascarene, (1740–1749). At that point Edward Cornwallis was appointed Governor.

== See also ==
- Lieutenant-Governors of Nova Scotia
- Military history of Canada

Military offices
Preceded by John Livesay	Colonel of 12th (Suffolk) Regiment of Foot; 1712–1717	Succeeded by Thomas Stanwix
New regiment	Colonel of 40th (Philipps') Regiment of Foot; 1717–1749	Succeeded by Hon. Edward Cornwallis
Preceded by Robert Dalzell	Colonel of 38th Regiment of Foot; 1750-October 1750	Succeeded by Alexander Duroure
Political offices
Preceded by Samuel Vetch	Governor of Nova Scotia; 1717–1749 with John Doucett (1722–1725); Lawrence Armstrong (1725–1739); Alexander Cosby (1739–1740); Paul Mascarene (1740–1749)	Succeeded by Edward Cornwallis
