= Marie Barbier de l'Assomption =

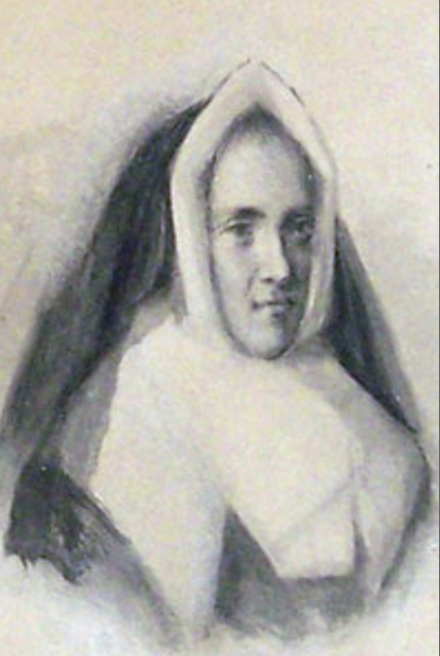
Marie Barbier de l'Assomption

Marie Barbier de l'Assomption (1663 – 19 May 1739) was a Religious Sister of the Congregation of Notre Dame and the first native of Montreal to be part of Marguerite Bourgeoys' congregation.

Barbier, who succeeded Bourgeoys as Superior General of the congregation, was instrumental in furthering its cause in New France. A sometime ally of Bishop Saint-Vallier, she spent many years struggling to keep the congregation free of some of his more oppressive decrees.

Barbier later held several administrative posts and continued to teach and work until her death.
