= Joseph La France =

Fur trader and explorer of Canada

- Born: c. 1707; Fort Michilimackinac, New France
- Died: c. 1745 (aged 37–38); London, England
- Occupation: Fur Trader
- Years active: 1739–1742
- Board member of: The Hudson Bay Company

Joseph La France, (c. 1707 – c. 1745), was a Métis fur trader in New France, and an explorer of the inland route from Montreal to Hudson Bay.

== Background ==
La France was born at Michilimackinac, the son of a French fur-trader and an Ojibwa woman, in the area where Fort Michilimackinac was founded when he was a child. He became a trader early in his life working with his father and had a varied and extensive training.

In 1739, having been refused a license to trade on the grounds that he had been selling brandy to the native peoples, he decided to align himself with the English traders at Hudson Bay. He began his trek toward there following the route of Pierre Gaultier de Varennes et de La Vérendrye through Rainy Lake, Lake of the Woods and the Winnipeg River to Lake Winnipeg. He must have made contact with some the La Vérendrye forts although no written record can confirm this assumption. He partnered with several Ojibwe and Cree trappers and traders, offering to get them higher prices for their furs from the British.

La France wintered in 1740–41 with natives of the Lake Winnipeg region. In 1741–42 he wintered further west and north in the region of Lake Manitoba and Lake Winnipegosis and the lower Saskatchewan River. He reached York Factory on Hudson Bay via the Hayes River in June 1742. He was traveling with a large band of Indians and several canoes full of furs for trade. The successful mission opened the British fur trade with the subarctic.

== London ==
Because the Hudson's Bay Company could not shelter French or Canadien traders, La France was sent to England later in 1742. In London he met Arthur Dobbs who was crusading against the HBC monopoly of the fur trade and their apparent reluctance to open up the northwest with interior forts. La France supplied crude maps as well as much information concerning the geography and demographics of the region. He recommended that the HBC meet growing French competition in the west as it was rapidly developing through the efforts of the La Vérendryes.

== Legacy ==
The La France trip is considered today as an important step in the exploration of the northwest. At the time it was discounted because Dobbs' evidence was considered suspect.
