= Samuel Vetch =

British military officer and colonial administrator (1668-1732)

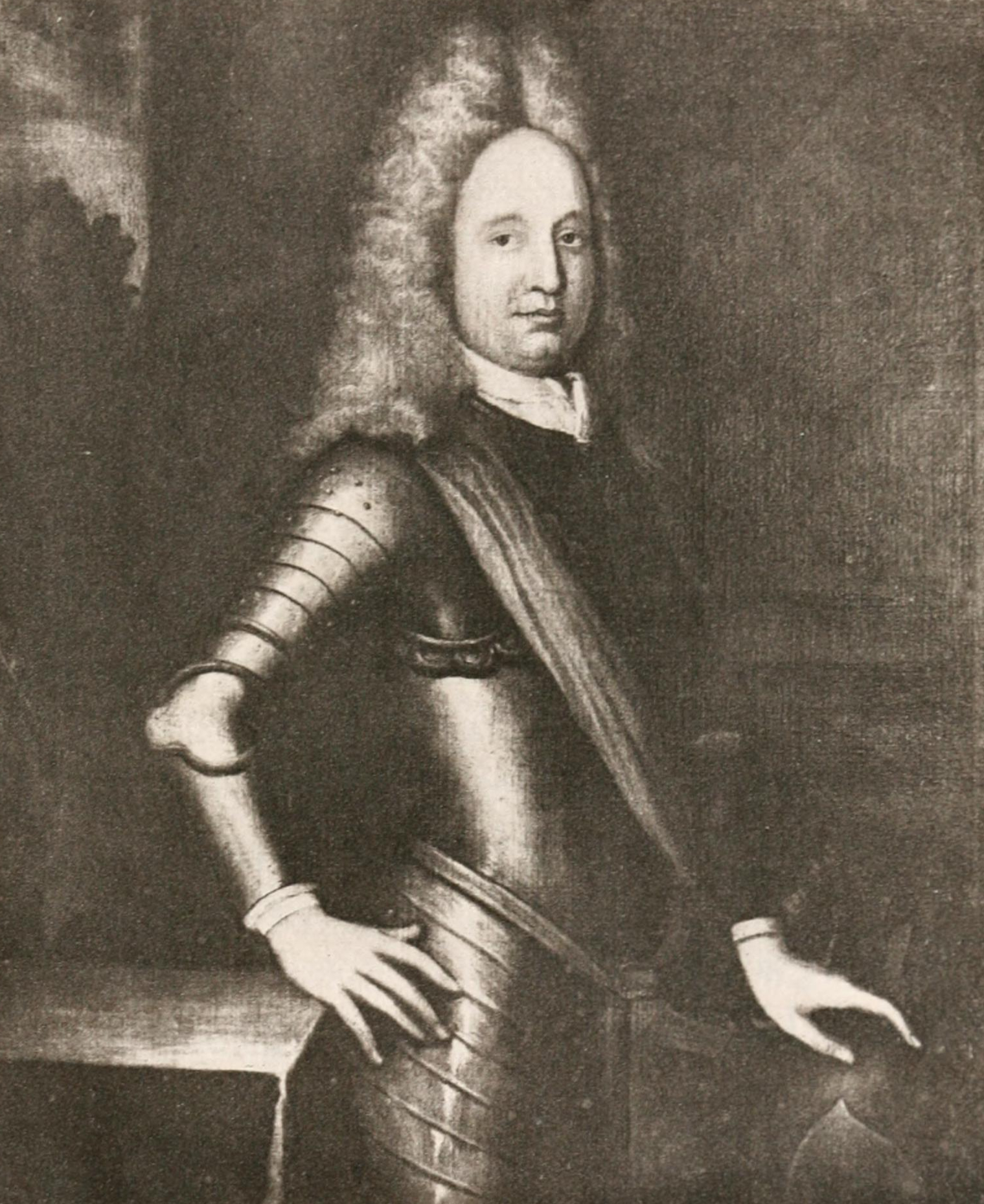
- Portrait of Vetch

Governor of Nova Scotia
- In office 1715–1717
- Preceded by: Thomas Caulfeild
- Succeeded by: Richard Philipps
- In office 1715–1715
- Preceded by: Francis Nicholson
- Succeeded by: Thomas Caulfeild
- In office 1710–1712
- Preceded by: Created
- Succeeded by: Francis Nicholson

Personal details
- Born: 9 December 1668 Edinburgh, Kingdom of Scotland
- Died: 30 April 1732 (aged 63) King's Bench Prison, Southwark, London, England, Kingdom of Great Britain
- Spouse: Margaret Livingston (after 1700)
- Parent(s): William Veitch; Marion Fairlie

Military service
- Allegiance: Scotland
- Branch/service: Scots Army
- Rank: Captain
- Unit: Royal Regiment of Scots Dragoons
- Battles/wars: Nine Years' War: Battle of Steenkerque; Battle of Landen

Samuel Vetch (9 December 1668 – 30 April 1732) was a British military officer and colonial administrator who thrice served as the governor of Nova Scotia between 1710 and 1717. He was a leading figure in the Darien scheme, a failed Scottish attempt to colonise the Isthmus of Panama in the late 1690s. During the War of the Spanish Succession Vetch was an early proponent of the idea that Great Britain should conquer New France, proposing in 1708 that it be captured and that French colonists in Acadia be deported. Vetch was the grandfather of Samuel Bayard.

== Early life ==
Samuel Vetch was born in Edinburgh, Scotland on 9 December 1668, and was baptised in the Church of Scotland the next day. His father, William Veitch, was a politically active Presbyterian minister. He and his wife Marion Fairley had a number of children, of whom Samuel was the second. Veitch was arrested in the hysteria surrounding the Popish Plot in the late 1670s, but was released. The family harboured the Duke of Argyll, who was sought for his refusal to take oaths prescribed by the Test Act, and Veitch became involved in the Scottish conspiracy contributing to the Monmouth Rebellion. When that failed, Veitch went into hiding, and eventually fled to the Dutch Republic, where he was joined in 1683 by his two oldest sons, William Jr. and Samuel. The boys studied for the ministry at Utrecht, but neither was interested in pursuing that career. Both became supporters of William of Orange, and Samuel was probably in a regiment of Scottish supporters in the 1688 Glorious Revolution that brought William III and Mary II to power in England.

== Career ==
He was then commissioned a cornet in the Royal Regiment of Scots Dragoons, "though very young", at the age of 20. The regiment was sent back to the Netherlands, where it fought in the Nine Years' War. Vetch was wounded at Steinkirk and was also in battle at Landen. By the end of the war he had been promoted to captain.

=== Colonial ventures and business ===
In 1698 Vetch and his brother William joined a Scottish attempt spearheaded by William Paterson to establish a colony on the Isthmus of Panama. The "Darien scheme" failed due to political infighting in the colony, diseases, lack of support, and Spanish hostility. Vetch was elected to the colonial council, and was one of the survivors (many of the 1,200 colonists sent to Central America, including William Vetch, succumbed to disease) to make his way to New York City in August 1699.

Vetch formed connections with the politically powerful Livingston family, marrying Margaret, the daughter of Robert Livingston. With the Livingstons Vetch then established a highly profitable but illegal trade with New France, and eventually settled in Boston, capital of the Province of Massachusetts Bay. Although he curtailed his trading activities when Queen Anne's War began in 1702, he was given a renewed opportunity for trade after Massachusetts Governor Joseph Dudley sent him on a diplomatic mission to Quebec in 1705 as part of an embassy to recover prisoners taken in a 1704 raid on Deerfield, Massachusetts. The embassy was a success, and Dudley permitted Vetch to make a trading voyage to New France in 1705. He was spotted upon his return, and the outcry compelled Dudley to have him put on trial and convicted in 1706 for trading with the enemy. He then sailed to England to appeal his conviction, and to lobby for military action against New France.

Using his knowledge of New France, Vetch proposed to Queen Anne the conquest of all of New France. His proposals included the deportation of the Acadian people to the West Indies so that Nova Scotia could be peopled by Protestant settlers. With the support of political allies and sympathetic colonial governors, the queen gave Vetch a military commission and promised him a governorship and military support for the 1709 campaign season. Along with Francis Nicholson, Vetch travelled to Boston in 1709 to raise colonial militia and supplies. However, the promised military force never arrived (having been diverted to the European theatre of the War of the Spanish Succession), and the effort collapsed. Nicholson immediately returned to London, and secured a new promise of support for 1710.

=== Governor of Nova Scotia ===
The 1710 expedition succeeded in capturing the Acadian capital of Port Royal, although little of the surrounding countryside was pacified. Vetch was named the first governor of Nova Scotia, and the town was renamed Annapolis Royal in honour of the queen. The garrison that was left there was woefully undersupplied, and Vetch apparently funded at least some of its expenses, although he did get some official assistance from Massachusetts. However, some of his underlings also complained that he was grossly mismanaging the affairs of the colony. Nicholson capitalised on these complaints to have himself appointed governor in Vetch's place in 1713.

=== Later years ===
Vetch then returned to England to recover his reputation and his lost funds. With the accession of George I to the throne, he succeeded, and was reappointed governor in 1715. However, he never returned to North America, as he was called on to advise on matters of North American trade and politics. He was formally replaced as governor in 1717 by Richard Philipps, and spent his remaining years in unsuccessful attempts to recoup his expenses and acquire other colonial postings.

== Personal life ==
In 1700, Vetch married Margaret Livingston (1681–1758), the daughter of Robert Livingston and Alida Schuyler Van Rensselaer. Together, they had:

- Alida Vetch (b. 1705), who married Stephen Bayard (1700–1757), scion of another prominent New York family.

He died in King's Bench Prison, where he had been sent because of his debts, in 1732. He was buried at St. George's in Southwark.

=== Descendants ===
His descendants included William Bayard (1729–1804), Samuel Bayard and Harriet Elizabeth Bayard Van Rensselaer (1799–1875).

=== Honors ===
There is a memorial plaque to Vetch at the Fort Anne National Historic Site in Annapolis Royal.

== Notes ==
Political offices
New office Preceded by French Governors of Acadia	Governor of Nova Scotia; October 1710-October 1713 with Charles Hobby (June–October 1711); Thomas Caulfeild (October 1711-October 1713)	Succeeded by Francis Nicholson
Preceded by Francis Nicholson	Governor of Nova Scotia; January 1715-August 1717 with Thomas Caulfeild (January 1715-March 1717)	Succeeded by Richard Philipps
