= Thomas Caulfeild (lieutenant governor) =

Canadian politician

Thomas Caulfeild (often also spelled Caulfield, baptized 26 March 1685 – 2 March 1716/7) was an early British Lieutenant-Governor of Nova Scotia. Due to the frequent absence of governors Samuel Vetch and Francis Nicholson, Caulfeild often acted as governor for extended periods between 1711 and his death.

Caulfeild was born to an English family in Ireland. He was the younger son of William Caulfeild, 2nd Viscount Charlemont and the daughter of the Archbishop of Armagh. He entered the military, serving in Spain during the early years of the War of the Spanish Succession. In 1710, his regiment was sent to North America, where he took part in Francis Nicholson's successful expedition against Port-Royal, the capital of French Acadia. The next year he served in Admiral Hovenden Walker's disastrous expedition to Quebec. He impressed General John Hill, the commander of the expedition's land forces, and was appointed by Hill to command the garrison at Annapolis Royal (as Port-Royal had been renamed) and serve as deputy to Governor Samuel Vetch.

Caulfeild was formally commissioned as Nova Scotia's lieutenant governor in October 1712. Vetch was absent from the province between October 1711 and June 1712, during which time Caulfeild was acting governor. Nicholson was also commissioned governor in October 1712, but his commission did not arrive in North America until 1713. In October of that year Nicholson, who was in Boston performing other duties, directed Caulfeild to assume command. Nicholson was absent during most of his time as governor, only briefly visiting the province in 1714. In 1715 Nicholson was replaced as governor by Vetch, but Vetch never came to the province again. Caulfeild governed the province in Vetch's absence until his (Caulfeild's) death in early 1717.

While acting as governor, Caulfeild was involved in several attempts to obtain oaths of allegiance to the British Crown from the Acadian French. He was unsuccessful in this endeavour, although he did obtain statements of neutrality from them upon the accession of King George I. Caulfeild incurred significant personal debts in maintaining the garrison at Annapolis Royal, and was highly critical of actions by Nicholson that he saw as divisive during Nicholson's brief stay in the province.

Political offices
| Preceded by Charles Hobby | Lieutenant Governor of Nova Scotia; October 1711-March 1717; Served under: Samuel Vetch and Francis Nicholson | Succeeded by John Doucett |
