= Edward Falkingham =

British Royal Navy officer and administrator

Captain Edward Falkingham
- Born: c.1683
- Died: 18 September 1757 (aged 73–74)
- Military career
- Allegiance: Kingdom of Great Britain
- Branch: Royal Navy
- Service years: 1703–1755
- Rank: Captain
- Commands: HMS Orford; Newfoundland Station; Commissioner of the Navy, Port Mahon; Commissioner of the Navy, Woolwich; Comptroller of the Navy

Viceregal styles of Edward Falkingham
- Reference style: His Excellency
- Spoken style: Your Excellency

Captain Edward Falkingham (c. 1683 – 18 September 1757) was an officer in the Royal Navy. He served for a time as Governor of Newfoundland and Comptroller of the Navy.

== Naval career ==
Falkingham received his first commission in 1703 when he was promoted to lieutenant. On 26 February 1713 he was promoted to the rank of captain in command of HMS Weymouth. Falkingham in charge of HMS Gibraltar, along with Commodore Thomas Kempthorne aboard of HMS Worcester, was charged with overseeing the enforcement of Treaty of Utrecht when it came to the fishing grounds of Newfoundland in 1715. A major concern to the merchants of England was the over-wintering of fisherman in Newfoundland and William Arnold, a New England trader, was suspecting of enticing those fisherman to over-winter in New England. Falkingham was assigned the duty of observing Arnold in the summer of 1715.

Falkingham went on to command various vessels in both the Baltic and the Mediterranean. In 1718 he commanded HMS Orford with distinction at the Battle of Cape Passaro, off the coast of Sicily.

On 5 May 1732, Falkingham was commissioned as Commodore-Governor of Newfoundland. Finding that there was only one prison, in St John's, Falkingham ordered the construction of other prisons in Ferryland, Bonavista and Carbonear. Falkingham retired from sea service in 1742 after which he was appointed resident commissioner of the navy at Port Mahon Dockyard on behalf of the Navy Board until 1744. In 1745 he was appointed Commissioner of the Navy at Woolwich Dockyard until 1746. In February 1755 he was appointed Comptroller of the Navy at the Navy Board; he held the post until November 1755. When his health began to fail him at the end 1755 he retired from the Navy altogether.

Political offices
Preceded by George Clinton	Commodore Governor of Newfoundland; 1732–1732	Succeeded by Viscount Muskerry
