= Claude-Thomas Dupuy =

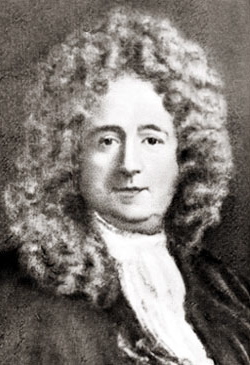

Claude-Thomas Dupuy (French pronunciation: [klod tɔma dypɥi]; 10 December 1678 – 15 September 1738) was from Paris, France, where he followed the family's path of upward mobility and prepared himself for a career in law. His good fortunes regarding his career were recognized in the appointment as Intendant of New France from 1726 to 1728 in New France (now Canada). He succeeded Michel Bégon de la Picardière in this position.

Dupuy took possession of his office in September 1726 but remained only two years in Canada. He seems to have been competent and perceptive but did not agree with the governor, Beauharnois on most issues. A continued disharmony between the two caused, in large part, the recall of Dupuy. His inflexibility and inadaptability made him unsuitable for the position. He returned to France and started a new career in the scientific world, where he was well regarded and successful.
