= John Doucett =

Canadian politician

John Doucett (Doucette) (died November 19, 1726) was probably of French descent although he did not speak the language and was likely born in England. He was a career military man and, from 1702 on, received several promotions.

He was appointed lieutenant-governor of Annapolis Royal in May, 1717 and arrived in Nova Scotia in October. He was also acting on behalf of Richard Philipps, the new governor of Nova Scotia who was still in England. He administered the government there from 1717 to 1720 and was lieutenant-governor of Annapolis Royal, N.S. from 1717 to 1726. He was active and visible in both capacities, working to improve relations between the British and French colonists, to minimize smuggling and fisheries encroachment, and to secure a lasting peace between the various Indian chiefs and the government. He had some noteworthy successes, particularly securing a ratified peace with the First Nations at the close of Dummer's War.

Political offices
Preceded by Thomas Caulfeild	Lieutenant Governor of Nova Scotia; 1717-1726; Served under: Richard Philipps	Succeeded by Lawrence Armstrong
