= Samuel Gledhill =

British politician and Lieutenant-Governor of Placentia

Samuel Gledhill (7 April 1677 – 1735 or 1736) was the lieutenant-governor of Placentia, Newfoundland from 1719 to c.1730.

== Life ==
He was born at Horbury, near Wakefieid, Yorkshire, the youngest of the 13 children of Robert Gledhill, a cloth-dresser and educated at Wakefield Grammar School. He joined the navy but was kidnapped in Spain to be sold as a slave in the West Indies.

After gaining his freedom he made his way to Spain and was commissioned a lieutenant in 1702 and promoted to lieutenant-colonel in 1707. He served in England and in the Low Countries, was wounded and taken prisoner at the Siege of Douai and subsequently freed in a prisoner exchange. In 1710 he lost a bid to be elected to Parliament for Carlisle and hotly contested the result to no avail. In 1712 he was made lieutenant-governor of Carlisle, with the rank of captain, in what later became the 11th (North Devonshire) Regiment of Foot. That same year he was the subject of affiliation proceedings in London's Westminster Sessions of the Peace (Ref WJ/SP/1712/01/001)

In 1719 he was appointed lieutenant-governor of Placentia and sailed to Newfoundland with his wife and three of his children, enduring a shipwreck en route. Once there he speculated heavily in land, property and shipowning. His wife and children returned to England, where his wife died soon after, although his son Joseph did later return to assist him with his businesses. Complaints about his exploitative trading activities, which were often at the expense of his duties, reached London, and he was relieved of his position and told to return home. He was, however, reinstated after a hearing and thereafter held the post until c.1730.

He died, possibly in Whitehaven, Cumberland, before May 1736, but more likely in London and was buried at the St Martins in the Fields cemetery 10 March 1735. His son took over his business ventures. He had married Isabella Richmond of Carlisle, by whom he had at least nine children.

== See also ==
- Castle Hill, Newfoundland and Labrador
- List of lieutenant governors of Newfoundland and Labrador
