= Lawrence Armstrong =

Canadian politician

Lawrence Armstrong (1664 – 6 December 1739) was a lieutenant-governor of Nova Scotia and acted as a replacement for the governor, Richard Philipps, during his long absences from the colony.

Armstrong was born in 1664 in Ireland. According to a Pedigree of Armstrongs compiled by Edmund Clarence Richard Armstrong, Bluemantle Pursuivant, Keeper of Irish Antiquities, National Museum, Dublin, His parents were Charles Armstrong (1646–1731) and a Miss Gostwick, who are shown in Burke's Commoners as having no issue. Charles Armstrong's birthplace was Stonestown, Offaly, Ireland.

Armstrong arrived in the New World in 1711 as a ship-wreck victim along with troops headed to take Quebec. He and a contingent of men were dispatched to strengthen Annapolis Royal, in Nova Scotia. The garrison was impoverished and Armstrong and his fellow captains had little choice but to use their own pay to support their companies, trying to improve their situation, until the appointment of Richard Philipps as governor and the establishment of the new Col. Philipp's Regiment of Foot in 1717.

Armstrong's debts accumulated as the problems of supporting his company increased, and with his Boston creditors pressing him, he went to England in 1715 to seek redress. In February 1715/16 he presented his case to the Lords of Trade, who arranged to reimburse him for his losses. He spent four years in England, living on his pay and compensation. He returned to Nova Scotia in 1720 where circumstances had markedly improved.

In 1725, he was appointed lieutenant-governor of Nova Scotia. His period as lieutenant-governor was marked by many difficulties and attempts to improve the lot of the colony. There was a mistrust and dislike between Armstrong and Governor Philipps, and ongoing problems with the governor's brother-in-law, Major Alexander Cosby, who had a great deal of influence in the colonies of Nova Scotia. Armstrong left Nova Scotia as soon as Philipps arrived in 1729, but was back in 1731 bearing a new commission, as colonel commanding the 40th Foot, with orders for Philipps' recall, and an entitlement to Philipps' pay.

At age 75 and suffering from illness, on 6 December 1739 Lieutenant-governor Armstrong died, allegedly by suicide, at Annapolis Royal, N.S.

Political offices
Preceded by John Doucett	Lieutenant Governor of Nova Scotia; 1725–1739; Served under: Richard Philipps	Succeeded by Alexander Cosby
