= List of Canadian monarchs =

Listed here are the monarchs who reigned over Canada, starting with the French colony of Canada, which subsequently became a British colony, followed by the British Dominion of Canada, and, finally, the present-day sovereign state of Canada. The date of the first claim by a monarch over Canada varies, with most sources giving the year as 1497, when John Cabot made landfall somewhere on the North American coast (likely either modern-day Newfoundland or Nova Scotia) and claimed the land for England on behalf of King Henry VII. However, some sources, instead, put this date at 1535, when the word Canada was first used to refer to the French colony of Canada, which was founded in the name of King Francis I of France. Monarchical governance subsequently evolved under a continuous succession of French, British, and eventually uniquely Canadian sovereigns. Since the first claim by Henry VII, there have been 33 sovereigns of Canada, including two sets of co-sovereigns.

While Canada became a Dominion within the British Empire upon Confederation in 1867, the concept of a fully independent Canada sharing the person of the sovereign with the United Kingdom and other countries, such as Australia and New Zealand, only emerged gradually over time through constitutional convention, and was officially confirmed with the passage of the Statute of Westminster in 1931. Since then, the Canadian Crown has been legally distinct from those of the other Commonwealth realms, with its own separate and distinct monarch. (Note: The English Court of Appeal ruled in 1982, while "there is only one person who is the Sovereign within the British Commonwealth... in matters of law and government the Queen of the United Kingdom, for example, is entirely independent and distinct from the Queen of Canada.") Although the term king of Canada was used as early as the beginning of the reign of George VI, it was not until 1953 that the monarch's title was made official, with Elizabeth II being the first monarch to be separately proclaimed as Queen of Canada, as per the Royal Style and Titles Act.

== Sovereigns of Canada ==
=== The French Crown (1534–1763) ===
Portrait	Regnal name	Reign		Full name	Consort
House of Valois
	Francis I (1494–1547)	24 July 1534	31 March 1547	Francis	Eleanor of Austria
	Francis I (1494–1547)	Territorial claim: 1534: in Francis' name, Jacques Cartier laid claim to New France, which included the colonies of Canada and later Acadia.			
	Henry II (1519–1559)	31 March 1547	10 July 1559	Henry	Catherine de' Medici
	Francis II (1544–1560)	10 July 1559	5 December 1560	Francis	Mary, Queen of Scots
	Charles IX (1550–1574)	5 December 1560	30 May 1574	Charles Maximilian	Elisabeth of Austria
	Henry III (1551–1589)	30 May 1574	2 August 1589	Alexandre Édouard	Louise of Lorraine
House of Bourbon
	Henry IV (1553–1610)	2 August 1589	14 May 1610	Henri de Bourbon	Margaret of Valois, Marie de' Medici
	Louis XIII (1601–1643)	14 May 1610	14 May 1643	Louis	Anne of Austria
	Louis XIV (1638–1715)	14 May 1643	1 September 1715	Louis-Dieudonné	Maria Theresa of Spain, Françoise d'Aubigné
	Louis XIV (1638–1715)	Territorial changes: 1655: acquired concrete claim to Placentia.; 1713: ceded Acadia, Placentia, and Hudson Bay to Anne.			
	Louis XV (1710–1774)	1 September 1715	10 February 1763	Louis	Marie Leszczyńska
	Louis XV (1710–1774)	Territorial changes: 1763: ceded New France to George III.			

=== The English and British Crowns (1497–1931) ===
Portrait	Regnal name	Reign		Full name	Consort
House of Tudor
	Henry VII (1457–1509)	24 June 1497	21 April 1509	Henry	Elizabeth of York
	Henry VII (1457–1509)	Territorial changes: 1497: in Henry's name, John Cabot laid claim to lands that soon came to be called "Canada". (Note: From 1763 to 1791 the colony of Canada was known as "Quebec" prior to returning to the name "Canada" (Upper and Lower) which were unified in 1841.) The English Crown did not concretely exercise this claim until the reign of King George III, when the colony of Canada was officially ceded from France to Great Britain.			
	Henry VIII (1491–1547)	21 April 1509	28 January 1547	Henry	Catherine of Aragon (1509), Anne Boleyn (1533), Jane Seymour (1536), Anne of Cleves (1540), Catherine Howard (1540), Catherine Parr (1543)
	Edward VI (1537–1553)	28 January 1547	6 July 1553	Edward	None
	Mary I (1516–1558) & Philip II (1527–1598) as co-sovereigns	19 July 1553 (Mary I) 25 July 1554 (Philip II)	17 November 1558	Mary Felipe	each other
	Elizabeth I (1533–1603)	17 November 1558	24 March 1603	Elizabeth	None
	Elizabeth I (1533–1603)	Territorial changes: 1583: in Elizabeth's name, Sir Humphrey Gilbert laid claim to the island of Newfoundland.			
House of Stuart
	James I (1566–1625)	24 March 1603	27 March 1625	Charles James	Anne of Denmark
	Charles I (1600–1649)	27 March 1625	30 January 1649	Charles	Henrietta Maria of France
Interregnum		30 January 1649	29 May 1660		
	Charles II (1630–1685)	29 May 1660	6 February 1685	Charles	Catherine of Braganza
	Charles II (1630–1685)	Territorial changes: 1670: created Rupert's Land.			
	James II (1633–1701)	6 February 1685	1 December 1688	James	Mary of Modena
Vacant		1 December 1688	13 February 1689		
	Mary II (1662–1694) & William III (1650–1702) as co-sovereigns	13 February 1689	28 December 1694 8 March 1702	Mary William	each other
	Anne (1665–1714)	8 March 1702	1 August 1714	Anne	Prince George of Denmark
	Anne (1665–1714)	Territorial changes: 1713: acquired Acadia, Placentia, and Hudson Bay from Louis XIV of France.			
House of Hanover
	George I (1660–1727)	1 August 1714	11 June 1727	George Louis	Sophia Dorothea of Celle
	George II (1683–1760)	11 June 1727 old calendar	25 October 1760 new calendar	George Augustus	Caroline of Ansbach
	George III (1738–1820)	25 October 1760	29 January 1820	George William Frederick	Charlotte of Mecklenburg-Strelitz
	George III (1738–1820)	Governors General of British North America: The Lord Dorchester; Robert Prescott; Robert Milnes; Thomas Dunn; James Henry Craig; George Prevost; Gordon Drummond; John Coape Sherbrooke; The Duke of Richmond			
	George III (1738–1820)	Territorial changes: 1763: acquired Canada from Louis XV of France; changed its name to Province of Quebec.; 1778: in George's name, James Cook laid claim to lands that later came to be called Vancouver Island.; 1791: created the provinces of Upper Canada and Lower Canada out of the Province of Quebec.; 1818: ceded Rupert's Land south of the 49th parallel to the United States; acquired the Louisiana Purchase north of the 49th parallel from the United States.			
	George IV (1762–1830)	29 January 1820	26 June 1830	George Augustus Frederick	Caroline of Brunswick
	George IV (1762–1830)	Governors General of British North America: The Earl of Dalhousie; James Kempt			
	William IV (1765–1837)	26 June 1830	20 June 1837	William Henry	Adelaide of Saxe-Meiningen
	William IV (1765–1837)	Governors General of British North America: The Lord Aylmer, The Earl of Gosford			
	Victoria (1819–1901)	20 June 1837	22 January 1901	Alexandrina Victoria	Albert of Saxe-Coburg and Gotha
	Victoria (1819–1901)	Governors General of British North America: The Earl of Gosford; John Colborne; The Earl of Durham; The Lord Sydenham; Charles Bagot; The Lord Metcalfe; The Earl Cathcart; The Earl of Elgin; Edmund Walker Head; The Viscount Monck; Governors General of Canada: The Viscount Monck; the Lord Lisgar; the Earl of Dufferin; the Marquess of Lorne; the Marquess of Lansdowne; the Lord Stanley of Preston; the Earl of Aberdeen; the Earl of Minto			
	Victoria (1819–1901)	Prime Ministers of Canada: John A. Macdonald; Alexander Mackenzie; John Abbott; John Thompson; Mackenzie Bowell; Charles Tupper; Wilfrid Laurier			
	Victoria (1819–1901)	Territorial changes: 1840: united Lower and Upper Canada into the Province of Canada.; 1846: acquired concrete claim to the Columbia District north of the 49th parallel and Vancouver Island.; 1867: united the Province of Canada (and created out of it Ontario and Quebec), Nova Scotia, and New Brunswick into the federal Dominion of Canada. (Note: In 1867, the separate colonies of Canada, Nova Scotia, and New Brunswick joined to form the Dominion of Canada. Subsequently, each of the other colonies in British North America eventually joined the union as provinces. Other provinces were created by the Dominion from its territories. Over time, Canada gradually gained increasing independence from the United Kingdom due to continued evolution in constitutional practice. However, it remained under the British Crown until 1931, when the Canadian Crown is generally accepted as having been created due to the enactment of the Statute of Westminster. The Dominion of Newfoundland continued as a separate British colony under the British Crown until it joined Canada in 1949.); 1870: created the province of Manitoba.; Joined Rupert's Land, the North-Western Territory (1870), British Columbia (1871), Prince Edward Island (1873), and the British Arctic Territories (1880) into the union.			
House of Saxe-Coburg and Gotha
	Edward VII (1841–1910)	22 January 1901	6 May 1910	Albert Edward	Alexandra of Denmark
	Edward VII (1841–1910)	Governors General of Canada: The Earl of Minto; the Earl Grey			
	Edward VII (1841–1910)	Prime Minister of Canada: Wilfrid Laurier			
	Edward VII (1841–1910)	Territorial changes: 1905: created the provinces of Alberta and Saskatchewan from part of the Northwest Territories.			
House of Windsor (Note: George V changed the name of the British royal house from Saxe-Coburg and Gotha to Windsor on 17 July 1917. This change was made in response to anti-German sentiment in the British Empire during World War I.)
	George V (1865–1936)	6 May 1910	11 December 1931	George Frederick Ernest Albert	Mary of Teck
	George V (1865–1936)	Governors General of Canada: The Earl Grey; the Duke of Connaught and Strathearn; the Duke of Devonshire; the Lord Byng of Vimy; the Marquess of Willingdon; the Earl of Bessborough			
	George V (1865–1936)	Prime Ministers of Canada: Wilfrid Laurier; Robert Borden; Arthur Meighen; William Lyon Mackenzie King; Richard B. Bennett			
	George V (1865–1936)	Territorial changes: 1931: granted Royal Assent to the Statute of Westminster 1931, thereby creating the Canadian Crown and leaving Newfoundland as the only part of Canada's current territory left under the British Crown.			

=== The Canadian Crown (1931–present) ===
In 1931 the Canadian Crown emerged as an independent entity from that of the British Crown due to the Statute of Westminster 1931.

The Dominion of Newfoundland had the same status as Canada in 1931. However, its parliament never adopted the statute to create a separate position of king of Newfoundland and would remain under the British Crown until it joined Canada in 1949.

Portrait	Regnal name	Reign		Full name	Consort
House of Windsor (Note: Descendants of Prince Philip, Duke of Edinburgh and Queen Elizabeth II belong to the House of Windsor by Royal Command (9 April 1952 Declaration by Queen Elizabeth II to her Privy Council) although under the usual rules of genealogy they are, by paternal descent, also members of the Glücksburg branch of the House of Oldenburg (the ruling House of Denmark and of the former Kingdom of Greece). Accordingly, King Charles III is the first monarch of the House of Windsor who is a patrilineal descendant of the Glücksburg dynasty, instead of descending from Prince Albert of Saxe-Coburg and Gotha in the male line as was the case with the previous monarchs of the House of Windsor.)
	George V (1865–1936)	11 December 1931	20 January 1936	George Frederick Ernest Albert	Mary of Teck
	George V (1865–1936)	Governors general: The Earl of Bessborough; the Lord Tweedsmuir			
	George V (1865–1936)	Prime ministers: Richard B. Bennett; William Lyon Mackenzie King			
	Edward VIII (1894–1972)	20 January 1936	11 December 1936	Edward Albert Christian George Andrew Patrick David	none
	Edward VIII (1894–1972)	Governor general: The Lord Tweedsmuir			
	Edward VIII (1894–1972)	Prime minister: William Lyon Mackenzie King			
	George VI (1895–1952)	11 December 1936	6 February 1952	Albert Frederick Arthur George	Elizabeth Bowes-Lyon
	George VI (1895–1952)	Governors general: The Lord Tweedsmuir; the Earl of Athlone; the Viscount Alexander of Tunis			
	George VI (1895–1952)	Prime ministers: William Lyon Mackenzie King; Louis St. Laurent			
	George VI (1895–1952)	Territorial change: 1949: merged Newfoundland (now Newfoundland and Labrador) into Canada, thereby putting all of Canada's current territory under the Canadian Crown.			
	Elizabeth II (1926–2022)	6 February 1952	8 September 2022	Elizabeth Alexandra Mary	Philip Mountbatten
	Elizabeth II (1926–2022)	Governors general: Vincent Massey; Georges Vanier; Roland Michener; Jules Léger; Edward Schreyer; Jeanne Sauvé; Ray Hnatyshyn; Roméo LeBlanc; Adrienne Clarkson; Michaëlle Jean; David Johnston; Julie Payette; Mary Simon			
	Elizabeth II (1926–2022)	Prime ministers: Louis St. Laurent; John Diefenbaker; Lester B. Pearson; Pierre Trudeau; Joe Clark; John Turner; Brian Mulroney; Kim Campbell; Jean Chrétien; Paul Martin; Stephen Harper; Justin Trudeau			
	Charles III (b. 1948)	8 September 2022	present	Charles Philip Arthur George	Camilla Shand
	Charles III (b. 1948)	Governors general: Mary Simon; Louise Arbour			
	Charles III (b. 1948)	Prime ministers: Justin Trudeau; Mark Carney			

== Consorts ==
The Canadian monarch's consort—his or her spouse—has no constitutional status or power, but is a member of the Canadian royal family. In the United Kingdom, all female consorts have had the right to and have held the title of queen consort; as Canada does not have laws or letters patent under the Great Seal of Canada laying out the styles of any royal family members besides the monarch, royal consorts are, as a courtesy, addressed in Canada using the style and title as they hold in the UK. After informal discussions among the various Commonwealth prime ministers between 1954 and 1957, it was decided that the Duke of Edinburgh, husband of Elizabeth II, would not be granted the title of prince consort.

Since Confederation, two sovereigns have reigned over Canada without a consort: Victoria, whose husband, Albert, died before Confederation, and Edward VIII, who married Wallis Simpson after his abdication.

== See also ==
- Constitutional history of Canada
- History of Canada
- History of monarchy in Canada
- List of current heads of state and government
- List of governors general of Canada
- Timeline of Canadian history
