= 1855 in Canada =

- Decades: 1830s; 1840s; 1850s; 1860s; 1870s
- See also: History of Canada; Timeline of Canadian history; List of years in Canada

Events from the year 1855 in Canada.

== Incumbents ==
- Monarch — Victoria

=== Federal government ===
- Parliament — 5th

=== Governors ===
- Governor General of the Province of Canada — Edmund Walker Head

=== Premiers ===
- Joint Premiers of the Province of Canada —
  - Canada West Premier
    - Sir Allan Napier MacNab, until May 24, 1856
    - Sir John A. Macdonald, from May 24, 1856
  - Canada East Premier
    - Sir Étienne-Paschal Taché

== British North America Colonies ==
- Colonial Governor of Newfoundland — Charles Henry Darling
- Premier of Newfoundland — Philip Francis Little
- Governor of Nova Scotia — John Gaspard Le Marchant
- Premier of Nova Scotia — William Young
- Governor of New Brunswick — John Manners-Sutton
- Premier of New Brunswick — Charles Fisher
- Governor of Prince Edward Island — Dominick Daly
- Premier of Prince Edward Island — John Holl

== Events ==
- British Empire's Crimean War continues, British troops being withdrawn.
- Albert Salter surveys the North Shore of Lake Huron, following the signing of the Robinson-Huron Treaty in 1850.
- January 1 – Bytown is renamed Ottawa.
- March 8 – A bridge over the Niagara River near Niagara Falls is completed.
- April 11 – The Militia Act of 1855 is passed in the Parliament of the Province of Canada
- April 17 – Charlottetown incorporated as a city.
- May 19 - The Militia Act is proclaimed.
- August 17 – The Charlottetown Police Department is established.
- August 31 – The First Volunteer Militia units are formed, by year end 21 Companies have been formed.
- November 19 – The first section of the Grand Trunk Railway's original Toronto–Montreal mainline is completed between Montreal and Brockville.

=== Full date unknown ===
- 1855 Newfoundland general election

== Births ==
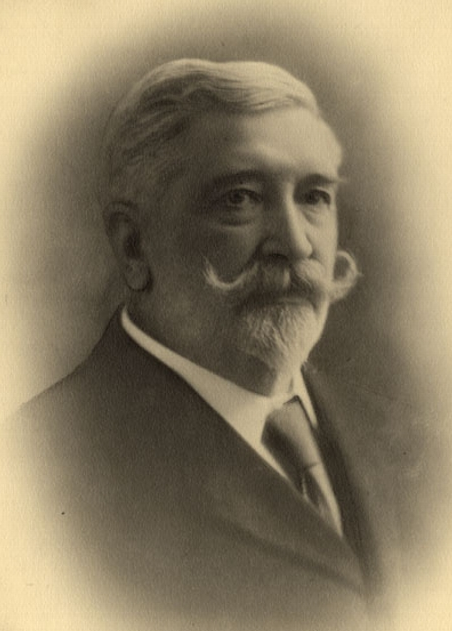
Nérée Le Noblet Duplessis

- January 14 – Homer Watson, artist (died 1936)
- February 22 – Grace Annie Lockhart, first woman in the British Empire to receive a Bachelor's degree (died 1916)
- March 5 – Nérée Le Noblet Duplessis, politician, 19th Mayor of Trois-Rivières and father of 16th Premier of Quebec Maurice Duplessis (died 1926)
- May 11 – Charles Doherty, politician and jurist (died 1931)
- July 29 – Bowman Brown Law, politician (died 1916)
- August 3 – Charles Hibbert Tupper, politician (died 1927)
- September 12 – Simon-Napoléon Parent, politician and Premier of Quebec (died 1920)
- December 14 – William Brymner, art teacher and painter (died 1925)

== Deaths ==
- July 7 – Henry Sherwood, lawyer, local politician and 4th Premier of Canada West (born 1802)
