= 1857 in Canada =

- Decades: 1830s; 1840s; 1850s; 1860s; 1870s
- See also: History of Canada; Timeline of Canadian history; List of years in Canada

Events from the year 1857 in Canada.

== Incumbents ==
- Monarch — Victoria

=== Federal government ===
- Parliament — 5th

=== Governors ===
- Governor General of the Province of Canada — Edmund Walker Head
- Colonial Governor of Newfoundland — Charles Henry Darling
- Governor of New Brunswick — John Manners-Sutton
- Governor of Nova Scotia — John Gaspard Le Marchant
- Governor of Prince Edward Island — Dominick Daly

=== Premiers ===
- Joint Premiers of the Province of Canada —
  - [[]], Canada West Premier
  - [[]], Canada East Premier
  - [[]],
- Premier of Newfoundland — Philip Francis Little
- Premier of New Brunswick — Charles Fisher
- Premier of Nova Scotia — William Young
- Premier of Prince Edward Island — John Holl

== Events ==
- March 12 — Desjardins Canal disaster - The bridge over Desjardins Canal, near Hamilton, Canada West, collapses under a Great Western Railway passenger train. About 60 people die.
- Grand Trunk Railway (Windsor-Montreal) completed, but $7 million in debt.
- December 31 - Queen Victoria names Ottawa as capital of the Province of Canada.
- The Palliser Expedition begins its exploration of Western Canada.

== Births ==
=== January to June ===
- February 2 — Alexander Cameron Rutherford, lawyer and politician, first premier of Alberta (died 1941)
- February 25 — Robert Bond, politician and Prime Minister of Newfoundland (died 1927)
- February 27 — Adelaide Hoodless, educational reformer who founded the Women's Institute (died 1910)
- March 17 — Willis Keith Baldwin, politician (died 1935)
- June 20 — Adam Beck, politician and hydro-electricity advocate (died 1925)

=== July to December ===
- July 27 — Ann Stowe-Gullen, doctor
- August 15 — Theodore Arthur Burrows, politician and Lieutenant-Governor of Manitoba (died 1929)
- August 15 — John Strathearn Hendrie, Lieutenant Governor of Ontario (died 1923)
- September 12 — George Halsey Perley, politician and diplomat (died 1938)
- October 10 — Cassie Chadwick, fraudster (died 1907)
- October 10 — George Johnson Clarke, lawyer, journalist, politician and 14th Premier of New Brunswick (died 1917)
- November 25 — Frederick W. A. G. Haultain, politician and 1st Premier of the Northwest Territories (died 1942)

== Deaths ==
- February 10 — David Thompson, fur trader, surveyor and map-maker (born 1770)
- March 13 — William Amherst, 1st Earl Amherst, diplomat and governor general (born 1773)
- September 3 — John McLoughlin, physician, fur trader, and merchant (born 1784)
- November 3 — William Fitzwilliam Owen, naval officer, hydrographic surveyor (born 1774)

=== Full date unknown ===
- Isabella Clark, first wife of John A. Macdonald, premier of the Province of Canada (born 1811)
