= 1765 in Canada =

- Decades: 1740s; 1750s; 1760s; 1770s; 1780s
- See also: History of Canada; Timeline of Canadian history; List of years in Canada

Events from the year 1765 in Canada.

== Incumbents ==
- Monarch: George III

=== Governors ===
- Governor of the Province of Quebec: James Murray
- Governor of Nova Scotia: Montague Wilmot
- Commodore-Governor of Newfoundland: Hugh Palliser

== Events ==
- 18 May – Fire destroys a large part of the town of Montreal, Quebec.
- The Stamp Act increases discontent. A Stamp Act Congress meets in New York City to protest the Act.
- Reserve system in Canada begins with the provision of a tract of land for the Maliseet tribe.

== Births ==
- April 6 – Paschal Chagnon (d. 1825)
- May 15 – Dominique Ducharme (d. 1853)
- July 9 – Étienne Duchesnois (d. 1826)
- August 3 – Étienne-Claude Lagueux (d. 1842)
- September 15 – Jacques Archambault (d. 1851)
- October 10 – Nicolas-Gaspard Boisseau (d. 1842)
- Unknown – Alexander Henry the younger (d. 1814)
- Unknown – John Brownell (d. 1809)

== Deaths ==
- July 4 – Claude-Godefroy Coquart, missionary (born 1706)
