= 1854 in Canada =

- Decades: 1830s; 1840s; 1850s; 1860s; 1870s
- See also: History of Canada; Timeline of Canadian history; List of years in Canada

Events from the year 1854 in Canada.

== Incumbents ==
- Monarch — Victoria

=== Federal government ===
- Parliament — 4th then 5th

=== Governors ===
- Governor General of the Province of Canada — James Bruce, 8th Earl of Elgin, Edmund Walker Head
- Colonial Governor of Newfoundland — Charles Henry Darling
- Governor of New Brunswick — Edmund Walker Head, John Manners-Sutton
- Governor of Nova Scotia — John Gaspard Le Marchant
- Governor of Prince Edward Island — Dominick Daly

=== Premiers ===
- Joint Premiers of the Province of Canada —
  - Francis Hincks, Canada West Premier
  - Augustin-Norbert Morin, Canada East Premier
- Premier of New Brunswick — Charles Fisher
- Premier of Nova Scotia — James Boyle Uniacke
- Premier of Prince Edward Island — John Holl

== Events ==
- January 27 – The Great Western Railway opens, linking Toronto, Hamilton and Windsor.
- June 6 – The Canadian–American Reciprocity Treaty is signed.
- October 27 – A Great Western Railway passenger train collides with the tail end of gravel train at Baptiste Creek, Canada West. At least 52 people are killed.
- Establishment of the African Baptist Association of Nova Scotia.
- St. Joseph's Academy for Young Ladies, later to be known as St. Joseph's College School, was founded by the Sisters of St. Joseph of Toronto.
- Sale of the Clergy Reserves in Canada West marking the end of any form of established religion in Canada.

== Births ==
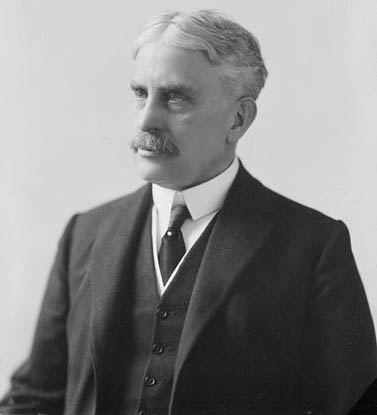
Robert Borden

- April 13 – William Henry Drummond, poet (died 1907)
- May 21 – Edward Gawler Prior, mining engineer, politician and Premier of British Columbia (died 1920)
- June 8 – Douglas Colin Cameron, politician and Lieutenant-Governor of Manitoba (died 1921)
- June 26 – Robert Borden, lawyer, politician and 8th Prime Minister of Canada (died 1937)
- August 29 – Arthur Peters, politician and Premier of Prince Edward Island (died 1908)
- September 1 – James Alexander Lougheed, businessman and politician (died 1925)

== Deaths ==
- January 20 – Denis-Benjamin Papineau, joint premier of the Province of Canada (born 1789)
- September 19 – Sir George Arthur, 1st Baronet, army officer and colonial administrator (born 1784)
