= 1853 in Canada =

- Decades: 1830s; 1840s; 1850s; 1860s; 1870s
- See also: History of Canada; Timeline of Canadian history; List of years in Canada

Events from the year 1853 in Canada.

== Incumbents ==
- Monarch — Victoria

=== Federal government ===
- Parliament: 4th

=== Governors ===
- Governor General of the Province of Canada — James Bruce, 8th Earl of Elgin
- Colonial Governor of Newfoundland — Charles Henry Darling
- Governor of New Brunswick — Edmund Walker Head
- Governor of Nova Scotia — John Gaspard Le Marchant
- Governor of Prince Edward Island — Dominick Daly

=== Premiers ===
- Joint Premiers of the Province of Canada —
  - Francis Hincks, Canada West Premier
  - Augustin-Norbert Morin, Canada East Premier
- Premier of Nova Scotia — James Boyle Uniacke
- Premier of Prince Edward Island — John Holl

== Events ==
- February 23 – A description of the proposed bridge across the St. Lawrence is published.
- June 6 – Gavazzi Riot in Quebec are quelled by military.
- June 26 – Investigation of the riot proceeds, at Montreal.
- July – Irregular calling of jurors delays trial for riot.
- July 15 – The Grand Trunk Railway merges numerous smaller Canadian railways into a conglomerate, while also leasing an American railway, the Atlantic and St. Lawrence Railroad, giving it access to the year-round Atlantic port at Portland, Maine.

=== Full date unknown ===
- Mary Ann Shadd becomes the first woman in North America to become editor of a newspaper. Working out of Chatham, Ontario, she publishes, edits and writes in the Provincial Freeman, a newspaper serving the Black community in Ontario.
- Russian explorer-trappers find oil seeps in Cook Inlet.

== Births ==
- February 15 – Rodmond Roblin, businessman, politician and 9th Premier of Manitoba (died 1937)
- March 23 – Donald Mann, railway contractor and entrepreneur (died 1934)
- July 18 – William McGuigan, politician and 10th Mayor of Vancouver (died 1908)
- August 10 – Pierre-Évariste Leblanc, politician and Lieutenant Governor of Quebec (died 1918)
- September 25 – Henry Emmerson, lawyer, businessman, politician, philanthropist and 8th Premier of New Brunswick (died 1914)
- November 13 – Joseph Boutin Bourassa, politician (died 1943)
- December 19 – Charles Fitzpatrick, lawyer, politician and 5th Chief Justice of Canada (died 1942)

== Deaths ==
- February 5 – Thomas Talbot, army and militia officer, settlement promoter, office holder, and politician (born 1771)
- March 31 – William Crane, merchant, justice of the peace, judge, and politician (born 1785)
- June 7 – Norbert Provencher, clergyman, missionary and Bishop (born 1787)
- June 28 – Benjamin Eby, Mennonite bishop and founder of Ebytown in Upper Canada (born 1785)
- July 11 – William Allan, banker and politician (born 1770)
- November 8 – Friedrich Gaukel, farmer, distiller and innkeeper who helped to transform the pioneer settlement of Ebytown into Berlin, Ontario
