= 1856 in Canada =

- Decades: 1830s; 1840s; 1850s; 1860s; 1870s
- See also: History of Canada; Timeline of Canadian history; List of years in Canada

Events from the year 1856 in Canada.

== Incumbents ==
- Monarch — Victoria

=== Federal government ===
- Parliament — 5th

=== Governors ===
- Governor General of the Province of Canada — Edmund Walker Head

=== Premiers ===
- Joint Premiers of the Province of Canada —
  - Canada West Premier
    - ,
  - Canada East Premier

== British North America Colonies ==
- Colonial Governor of Newfoundland — Charles Henry Darling
- Premier of Newfoundland — Philip Francis Little
- Governor of Nova Scotia — John Gaspard Le Marchant
- Premier of Nova Scotia — William Young
- Governor of New Brunswick — John Manners-Sutton
- Premier of New Brunswick — Charles Fisher
- Governor of Prince Edward Island — Dominick Daly
- Premier of Prince Edward Island — John Holl

== Events ==
- March 30 – The Crimean War, fought by British Empire, ends with the signing of the Treaty of Paris.
- May 15 – Creation of the village of Embrun, Ontario.
- October 27 – The two halves of the Grand Trunk Railway are joined with the construction of the Oshawa–Brockville section of the original mainline. Celebratory trains meet near the centre of the line at Kingston. The western terminus of the mainline is the east bank of the Don River.
- Formation of the British Methodist Episcopal Church (BME), an all Black church.
- While surveying lands recently acquired by the Crown under the Robinson-Huron Treaty, British land surveyor Albert Salter observes a significant magnetic anomaly near the future site of Creighton Mine in modern-day Northern Ontario. This is an early scientific observation of the vast mineral resources of the Sudbury Basin.

== Births ==
- May 16 – Charles Melville Hays, railway executive (died 1912)
- May 20 – Eliza Ritchie, feminist
- July 6 – Kate Simpson Hayes, playwright and legislative librarian (died 1945)
- July 31 – John Oliver, politician and Premier of British Columbia (died 1927)

== Deaths ==
- December – Samuel Street Wilmot, surveyor, tanner, farmer, justice of the peace, and assemblyman in Upper Canada (b. 1773)
