= 1851 in Canada =

- Decades: 1830s; 1840s; 1850s; 1860s; 1870s
- See also: History of Canada; Timeline of Canadian history; List of years in Canada

Events from the year 1851 in Canada.

== Incumbents ==
- Monarch — Victoria

=== Federal government ===
- Parliament: 3rd

=== Governors ===
- Governor General of the Province of Canada — James Bruce, 8th Earl of Elgin
- Colonial Governor of Newfoundland — Charles Henry Darling
- Governor of New Brunswick — Edmund Walker Head
- Governor of Nova Scotia — John Harvey
- Governor of Prince Edward Island — Dominick Daly

=== Premiers ===
- Joint Premiers of the Province of Canada —
  - Robert Baldwin, Canada West Premier
  - Louis-Hippolyte Lafontaine, Canada East Premier
- Premier of Nova Scotia — James Boyle Uniacke
- Premier of Prince Edward Island — John Holl

== Events ==
- April 7 – The first Canadian postage stamps are printed.
- April 25 – Prince Edward Island wins responsible government.
- June – Harbor Commissioners deepen Lake St. Peter.
- July – The bloomer costume appears in Montreal.
- July 31 – Broad Provincial railway gauge is legislated in the Province of Canada, creating a break-of-gauge with American railways.
- August 30 – The Vancouver Island legislature meets for the first time.
- October 11 – The St. L. & A. Railway is opened to Richmond.
- William Kennedy was commander of the second sponsored expedition to find Sir John Franklin.

=== Full date unknown ===
- Gabriel Franchere's Narrative of a Voyage to the Northwest Coast of America published in Montreal.
- The United Kingdom transfers control of the colonial postal system to Canada.

== Births ==
- April 7 – John Wilson Bengough, political cartoonist (died 1923)
- April 8 – Frederick Peters, lawyer, politician and Premier of Prince Edward Island (died 1919)
- May 22 – Gilbert Ganong, businessman, politician and Lieutenant Governor of New Brunswick (died 1917)
- July 8 – James Dunsmuir, industrialist, politician and Premier of British Columbia (died 1920)
- August 26 – Herbert James Palmer, politician and Premier of Prince Edward Island (died 1939)
- September 5 – George Frederick Baird, politician and lawyer (died 1899)
- November – Levi Addison Ault, businessman and naturalist (died 1930)
- November 28 – Albert Grey, 4th Earl Grey, 9th Governor General of Canada (died 1917)
- December 10 – James Albert Manning Aikins, politician and Lieutenant-Governor of Manitoba (died 1929)
