= 1767 in Canada =

- Decades: 1740s; 1750s; 1760s; 1770s; 1780s
- See also: History of Canada; Timeline of Canadian history; List of years in Canada

Events from the year 1767 in Canada.

== Incumbents ==
- Monarch: George III

=== Governors ===
- Governor of the province of Quebec: James Murray
- Governor of Nova Scotia: Montague Wilmot
- Commodore-Governor of Newfoundland: Hugh Palliser

== Events ==
- A second Fort Dauphin was built on the north shore of Lake Dauphin.
- Establishment of the Collège de Montréal.
- In the fall of 1767, the Gueguen, Arseneau, Hébert and Bourg families receive the first land grant conveyed to Acadians after the Expulsion. In November, Cocagne becomes the first Acadian community established with official permission from the British Crown.

== Births ==
- May 19 – Sir George Prevost (died 1816)
