= 1852 in Canada =

- Decades: 1830s; 1840s; 1850s; 1860s; 1870s
- See also: History of Canada; Timeline of Canadian history; List of years in Canada

Events from the year 1852 in Canada.

== Incumbents ==
- Monarch — Victoria

=== Federal government ===
- Parliament: 4th

=== Governors ===
- Governor General of the Province of Canada — James Bruce, 8th Earl of Elgin
- Colonial Governor of Newfoundland — Charles Henry Darling
- Governor of New Brunswick — Edmund Walker Head
- Governor of Nova Scotia — John Harvey
- Governor of Prince Edward Island — Dominick Daly

=== Premiers ===
- Joint Premiers of the Province of Canada —
  - Francis Hincks, Canada West Premier
  - Augustin-Norbert Morin, Canada East Premier
- Premier of Nova Scotia — James Boyle Uniacke
- Premier of Prince Edward Island — John Holl

== Events ==
- January 15 – Trinity College opens.
- July 8 – Beginning of a fire which burns 11,000 houses in Montreal.
- October – The Bank of Montreal issues notes like the Bank of England's; denomination water-marked.
- October 25 – The Toronto Stock Exchange opens.
- November 10 – The Grand Trunk Railway Company is incorporated to build a railway between Toronto and Montreal.
- December 8 – Laval's Seminaire du Quebec founds Université Laval, North America's oldest French Language university.

=== Full date unknown ===
- The 1852 Newfoundland general election occurs.

== Births ==
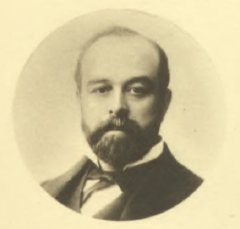
Theodore Davie

- January 1 – Alexander Bethune, politician and 12th Mayor of Vancouver (died 1947)
- March 22 – Theodore Davie, lawyer, politician and 9th Premier of British Columbia (died 1898)
- April 5 – Alexander Warburton, politician, jurist, author and Premier of Prince Edward Island (died 1929)
- August 19 – John Andrew Davidson, politician (died 1903)
- September 9 – Fletcher Bath Wade, politician and barrister (died 1905)
- September 24 – Joseph Martin, lawyer, politician and 13th Premier of British Columbia (died 1923)
- November 2 – Paul Tourigny, politician (died 1926)

== Deaths ==
- April 3 – Alexander Rankin, timber merchant, justice of the peace, politician, and office holder (born 1788)
- November 3 – Francis Gore, colonial administrator (born 1769)
