= 1770 in Canada =

- Decades: 1750s; 1760s; 1770s; 1780s; 1790s
- See also: History of Canada; Timeline of Canadian history; List of years in Canada

Events from the year 1770 in Canada.

== Incumbents ==
- Monarch: George III

=== Governors ===
- Governor of the Province of Quebec: Guy Carleton
- Governor of Nova Scotia: Lord William Campbell
- Commodore-Governor of Newfoundland: John Byron
- Governor of St. John's Island: Walter Patterson

== Events ==
- December – Samuel Hearne departs on his third voyage of discovery.
- The city of Saint-Eustache, Quebec is established.

== Births ==
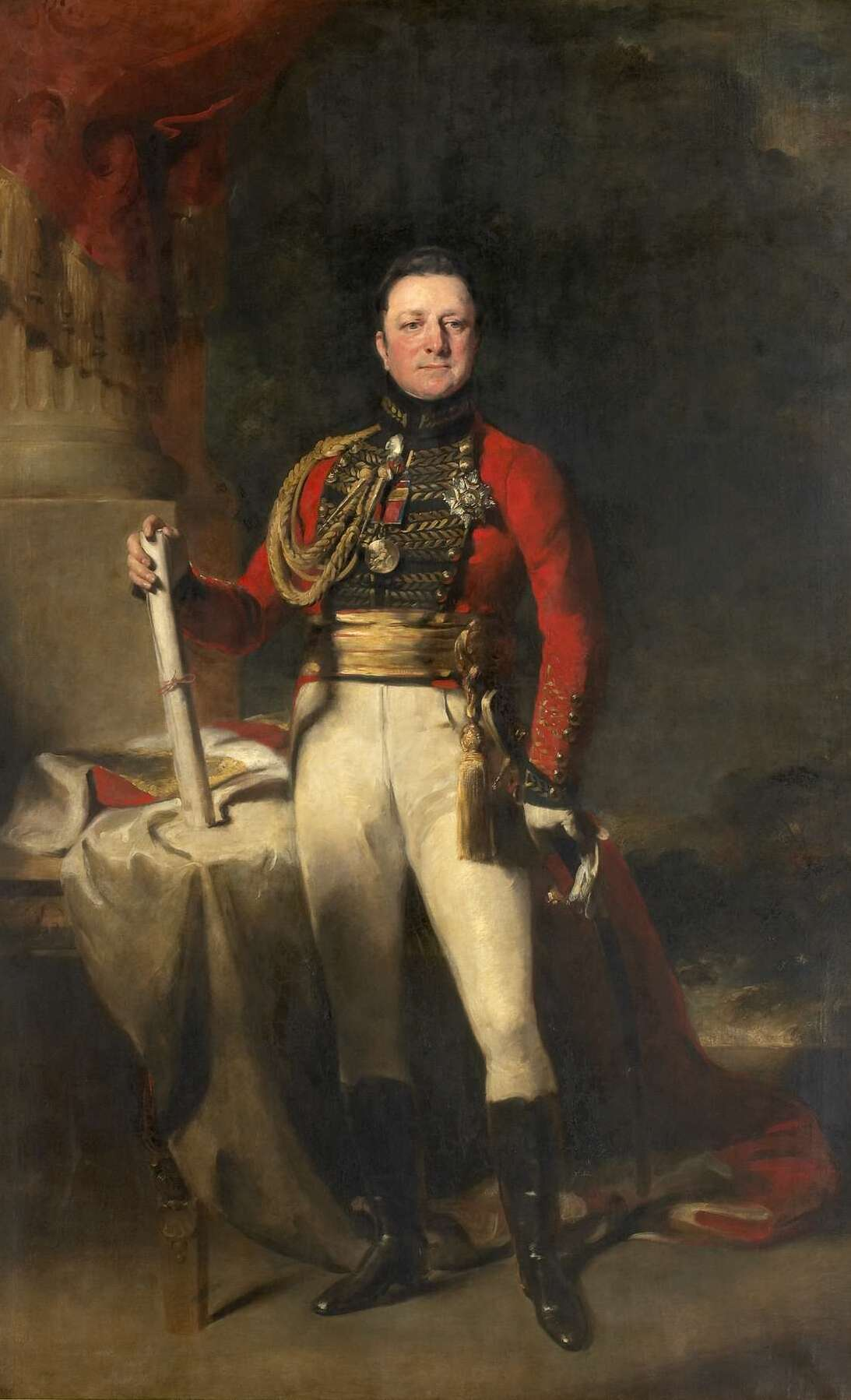
George Ramsay

- April 7 – William Wordsworth, in Cockermouth, England (d.1850)
- April 30 – David Thompson, fur trader, surveyor and map-maker (d.1857)
- June 4 (baptised) – William Carson, in Kirkcudbright, Scotland (d.1843)
- October 23 – George Ramsay, 9th Earl of Dalhousie (d.1838)

=== Full date unknown ===
- William Allan, near Huntly, Scotland (d.1853)

== Deaths ==
- February 12 – Christopher Middleton, Hudson's Bay Company captain
