= 1772 in Canada =

- Decades: 1750s; 1760s; 1770s; 1780s; 1790s
- See also: History of Canada; Timeline of Canadian history; List of years in Canada

Events from the year 1772 in Canada.

== Incumbents ==
- Monarch: George III

=== Governors ===
- Governor of the Province of Quebec: Guy Carleton
- Governor of Nova Scotia: Lord William Campbell
- Commodore-Governor of Newfoundland: Molyneux Shuldham, 1st Baron Shuldham
- Governor of St. John's Island: Walter Patterson

== Events ==
- Samuel Hearne explores Coppermine River to Arctic Ocean.
- HBC Mathey Cocking, to Blackfeet country west of Eagle Hills.
- The Hudson's Bay Company opens Cumberland House on the Saskatchewan River.
- James Cook and George Vancouver explore the northwest coast of America.
- The Yorkshire emigration begins with the arrival of 62 passengers aboard The Duke of York.

== Deaths ==
- September 30: Jean-Louis Le Loutre, priest, Spiritan, and missionary (born 1709)
