= 1771 in Canada =

- Decades: 1750s; 1760s; 1770s; 1780s; 1790s
- See also: History of Canada; Timeline of Canadian history; List of years in Canada

Events from the year 1771 in Canada.

== Incumbents ==
- Monarch: George III

=== Governors ===
- Governor of the Province of Quebec: Guy Carleton
- Governor of Nova Scotia: Lord William Campbell
- Commodore-Governor of Newfoundland: John Byron
- Governor of St. John's Island: Walter Patterson

== Events ==
- July 17 – Massacre at Bloody Falls: Chipewyan chief Matonabbee traveling as the guide to Samuel Hearne on his Arctic overland journey, massacre a group of unsuspecting Inuit.
- Captain James Cook completes his first voyage around the world.
- Lieutenant Governor Michael Francklin of Nova Scotia travels to northern England to seek immigrants to replace those displaced by the Acadian expulsion.

== Births ==
- January 19: Thomas Talbot, army and militia officer, settlement promoter, office holder, and politician (d.1853)
- June 20: Thomas Douglas, 5th Earl of Selkirk, colonizer and author (d.1820)

=== Full date unknown ===
- James Bardin Palmer, land agent, lawyer, office holder, and politician (d.1833)

== Deaths ==
- December 23 : Marie-Marguerite d'Youville, grey nun (b.1701)
