= 1766 in Canada =

- Decades: 1740s; 1750s; 1760s; 1770s; 1780s
- See also: History of Canada; Timeline of Canadian history; List of years in Canada

Events from the year 1766 in Canada.

== Incumbents ==
- Monarch: George III

=== Governors ===
- Governor of the Province of Quebec: James Murray
- Governor of Nova Scotia: Montague Wilmot
- Commodore-Governor of Newfoundland: Hugh Palliser

== Events ==
- March 18 – The Stamp Act is repealed.
