= 1773 in Canada =

- Decades: 1750s; 1760s; 1770s; 1780s; 1790s
- See also: History of Canada; Timeline of Canadian history; List of years in Canada

Events from the year 1773 in Canada.

== Incumbents ==
- Monarch: George III

=== Governors ===
- Governor of the Province of Quebec: Guy Carleton
- Governor of Nova Scotia: Lord William Campbell
- Commodore-Governor of Newfoundland: John Byron
- Governor of St. John's Island: Walter Patterson

== Events ==
- December – Prominent French Canadians petition the King to restore their ancient laws and accord them the rights of British subjects, reminding him that five-sixths of the seigniories belong to Frenchmen. They represent that the Labrador Coast and fisheries, now alienated to Newfoundland, should revert to Canada. They prefer a Legislative Council, nominated by the King, because less expensive than an Elective Assembly.
- Lord Dartmouth promises Canadians just and considerate treatment respecting their religion.
- Montreal Ft. La Traite, on Churchill River, by Frobisher to cut into HBC's trade.

== Births ==
- January 14 – William Amherst, 1st Earl Amherst, diplomat and governor general (d.1857)
- March 29 – Samuel Street Wilmot, surveyor, tanner, farmer, justice of the peace, and assemblyman in Upper Canada (d. 1856)

=== Full date unknown ===
- Joseph Willcocks, diarist, office holder, printer, publisher, journalist, politician, and army officer (d.1814)

== Deaths ==
- January 31 – Sebastian Zouberbuhler, merchant and politician in Nova Scotia
