= 1850 in Canada =

- Decades: 1830s; 1840s; 1850s; 1860s; 1870s
- See also: History of Canada; Timeline of Canadian history; List of years in Canada

Events from the year 1850 in Canada.

== Incumbents ==
- Monarch — Victoria

=== Federal government ===
- Parliament: 3rd

=== Governors ===
- Governor General of the Province of Canada — James Bruce, 8th Earl of Elgin
- Colonial Governor of Newfoundland — Charles Henry Darling
- Governor of New Brunswick — Edmund Walker Head
- Governor of Nova Scotia — John Harvey
- Governor of Prince Edward Island — Dominick Daly

=== Premiers ===
- Joint Premiers of the Province of Canada —
  - Robert Baldwin, Canada West Premier
  - Louis-Hippolyte Lafontaine, Canada East Premier
- Premier of Nova Scotia — James Boyle Uniacke

== Events ==
- January 14 – Malcolm Cameron visits Washington, D.C. about a trade reciprocity agreement.
- September 7 – After tense negotiations, the first of the Robinson Treaties, the Robinson-Superior Treaty, is signed. This treaty between William Benjamin Robinson and an assembly of Ojibwe chiefs from the shore of Lake Superior creates a system of Indian reserves and ultimately opens up the area to European settlement.
- September 9 – The second of the Robinson Treaties, the Robinson-Huron Treaty, is signed between Robinson and the Ojibwe chiefs of Lake Huron. The Lake Huron chiefs, led by Shingwaukonse, are more resistant to the signing of the treaty as they are more familiar with the treaty system and are more threatened by encroachment from Europeans, as well as having tense relations with the Canada West government following the Mica Bay Incident.
- October 11 – The St. Lawrence and Atlantic Railroad opens.

=== Full date unknown ===
- In the United States, the Fugitive Slave Act is passed. It provides that even free persons can be made a slave if suspected of being a runaway. As a result, more fugitive slaves and free Black persons come to Canada.
- The site of John By's headquarters during the construction of the Rideau Canal is incorporated as Bytown.
- Gold discovered in British Columbia, and coal on Vancouver Island.
- The Canadian government passes the Railway Guarantee Act.

== Births ==
=== January to June ===
- January 27 – Louis-Philippe Hébert, sculptor (died 1917)
- March 7 – Éphrem-A. Brisebois, police officer (died 1890)
- April 15 – William Thomas Pipes, politician and Premier of Nova Scotia (died 1909)
- April 29 – George Murdoch, politician and 1st Mayor of Calgary (died 1910)
- March 13 – Hugh John Macdonald, politician, Minister and 8th Premier of Manitoba (died 1929)
- May 1 – Prince Arthur, Duke of Connaught and Strathearn, 10th Governor General of Canada (died 1942)
- May 6 – Joseph-Hormisdas Legris, politician and Senator (died 1932)

=== July to December ===
- July 11 – John Augustus Barron, politician and lawyer (died 1936)
- September 27 – William Pugsley, lawyer, politician and 10th Premier of New Brunswick (died 1925)
- December 15 – Joseph-Alphonse Couture, veterinarian
- December 31 – John Wycliffe Lowes Forster, artist (died 1938)

=== Full date unknown ===
- Daniel J. Greene, politician and Prime Minister of Newfoundland (died 1911)
- Charles Braithwaite, politician and agrarian leader (died 1910)

== Deaths ==
- February 23 – Matthew Whitworth-Aylmer, 5th Baron Aylmer, army officer and colonial administrator (born 1775)
- April 23 – William Wordsworth, poet (born 1770)
