= 1760 in Canada =

- Decades: 1740s; 1750s; 1760s; 1770s; 1780s
- See also: History of Canada; Timeline of Canadian history; List of years in Canada

Events from the year 1760 in Canada.

== Incumbents ==
- French Monarch: Louis XV
- British and Irish Monarch: George II (until October 25), then George III

=== Governors ===
- Governor General of New France: Pierre François de Rigaud, Marquis de Vaudreuil-Cavagnal
- Colonial Governor of Louisiana: Louis Billouart
- Governor of Nova Scotia: Charles Lawrence
- Commodore-Governor of Newfoundland: James Webb
- Governor of the Province of Quebec: Jeffery Amherst

== Events ==
- Sunday April 20 – Seven thousand French troops start to recapture Quebec.
- Monday April 28 – Murray's 7,714 troops retire to the Citadel, after fighting the Canadiens outside the walls of Quebec. The French prepare to besiege.
- Friday May 9 – The belligerents, of each nationality, expect a fleet bringing troops and supplies. An approaching frigate proves to be British.
- Thursday May 15 – Two more British war-ships arrive. The British win a naval battle near Quebec.
- Saturday May 17 – The French raise the siege of Quebec.
- Sunday 6 July – Commencement of the Montreal Campaign by General Jeffery Amherst
- Saturday September 6 – Amherst arrives at Montreal.
- September 6 to September 7 – A council of war, at Montreal, favors capitulation.
- Monday September 8 – Amherst's, Murray's, and Haviland's commands, around Montreal, are about 17,000.
- The articles of capitulation are agreeable to the French, except that they do not concede "all the honors of war" or "perpetual neutrality of Canadiens."
- De Levis threatens to retire to St. Helen's Island and fight to the last; but the Governor orders him to disarm.
- Fortress Louisbourg demolished by the British.
- Fall of Montreal and surrender of Great Lakes and Ohio Valley French forts to English. Lord Jeffery Amherst starts a "get tough with Indians" policy, including the first biological warfare --smallpox-infested blankets. Amherst granted some Seneca (originally his allies) lands to his officers. Odawa chief Pontiac (and the Delaware Prophet) organize a resistance preaching return to traditional Indian customs. The 1761 draft Proclamation (to English governors), and the Royal Proclamation of 1763 (with a large Indian country in what's now the U.S. Great Lakes/Midwest) were part of the English Crown's attempt to mollify the Indians. Neither proclamation of undisturbed Indian lands was followed by settlers or the Crown.
- The British Conquest. General James Murray is appointed first British military governor of Quebec.

== Births ==
- November 10 – William Black, Methodist minister (d.1834)

== Deaths ==
- January 22 : Paul Mascarene, governor of Nova Scotia
