= 1764 in Canada =

- Decades: 1740s; 1750s; 1760s; 1770s; 1780s
- See also: History of Canada; Timeline of Canadian history; List of years in Canada

Events from the year 1764 in Canada.

== Incumbents ==
- Monarch: George III

=== Governors ===
- Governor of the Province of Quebec: Jeffery Amherst
- Colonial Governor of Louisiana: Louis Billouart
- Governor of Nova Scotia: Jonathan Belcher
- Commodore-Governor of Newfoundland: Richard Edwards

== Events ==
=== Full date unknown ===
- 1764–1765: The Sugar Act and Stamp Act, by which Britain aims to recover revenue from the American colonies, arouses local opposition.
- James Murray becomes civil governor of Quebec, but his attempts to appease French Canadians are disliked by British merchants.
- Canada is divided into two chief judicial districts (Quebec and Montreal). Martial law, in Canada, terminates.
- Fort Erie is constructed. It is the first British fort to be constructed in the Canadian territories which were newly annexed from the French.
