= 1816 in Canada =

- Decades: 1790s; 1800s; 1810s; 1820s; 1830s
- See also: History of Canada; Timeline of Canadian history; List of years in Canada

Events from the year 1816 in Canada.

== Incumbents ==
- Monarch: George III

=== Federal government ===
- Parliament of Lower Canada: 8th (until February 29)
- Parliament of Upper Canada: 6th (until April 1)

=== Governors ===
- Governor of the Canadas: Robert Milnes
- Governor of New Brunswick: George Prevost
- Governor of Nova Scotia: John Coape Sherbrooke
- Commodore-Governor of Newfoundland: Richard Goodwin Keats
- Governor of Prince Edward Island: Charles Douglass Smith

== Events ==
- January 5 – Sir George Prevost dies before consideration of Commodore Yeo's charges; but the Duke of Wellington says: "He must have returned, after the fleet was beaten, I am inclined to think he was right. I have told ministers, repeatedly, that naval superiority, on the Lakes, is a sine qua non of success in war on the frontiers of Canada, even if our object should be wholly defensive."
- June 19 – After several years of harassment, sabotage, and minor skirmishes between members of the Hudson's Bay and North West Companies, a full-scale battle (today known at Battle of Seven Oaks) breaks out between parties led by Cuthbert Grant and Robert Semple. The Hudson's Bay men, instigators of the confrontation though outnumbered nearly three to one, suffer 21 deaths, while Grant's party suffers two deaths, one Métis and one Native. The battle is frequently cited as a seminal moment in the history of the Métis people.
- A steamboat PS Frontenac is first placed on Lake Ontario.

== Births ==
- October 5 – George Kingston, meteorologist (d.1886)
- December 30 – William Alexander Henry, politician (d.1888)
- December 31 – Joseph-Édouard Cauchon, politician (d.1885)

== Deaths ==
- January 5 – Sir George Prevost (b.1767)
