= 1761 in Canada =

- Decades: 1740s; 1750s; 1760s; 1770s; 1780s
- See also: History of Canada; Timeline of Canadian history; List of years in Canada

Events from the year 1761 in Canada.

== Incumbents ==
- French Monarch: Louis XV
- British and Irish Monarch: George III

=== Governors ===
- Governor of the Province of Quebec: Jeffery Amherst
- Colonial Governor of Louisiana: Louis Billouart
- Governor of Nova Scotia: Jonathan Belcher
- Commodore-Governor of Newfoundland: Richard Edwards

== Events ==
- Wednesday July 29 – The British terms of peace are so hard that Choiseul declares: "I am as indifferent to peace as Pitt can be. I freely admit the King's desire for peace, and his Majesty may sign such a treaty, but my hand shall never be set to it."
- Tuesday October 6 – King George III offers Pitt the governorship of Canada, with £5,000 per annum, but, instead, makes Pitt's wife, Hester Pitt, Countess of Chatham, a peeress; and £13,000 per annum is granted to the survivor of three of his family.
- Canada under Martial law.

== Births ==
- August 1 : Pierre-Louis Panet, notary and politician

== Deaths ==
- November 15
  - Louis-Joseph Gaultier de La Vérendrye, French Canadian fur trader and explorer (born 1717)
  - Louis de la Corne, Chevalier de la Corne, explorer (born 1703)
