= 1815 in Canada =

- Decades: 1790s; 1800s; 1810s; 1820s; 1830s
- See also: History of Canada; Timeline of Canadian history; List of years in Canada

Here are events and incumbents from 1815 in Canada.

== Incumbents ==
- Monarch: George III

=== Federal government ===
- Parliament of Lower Canada: 8th (starting January 21)
- Parliament of Upper Canada: 6th

=== Governors ===
- Governor of the Canadas: George Prevost then Gordon Drummond
- Governor of New Brunswick: Thomas Carleton
- Governor of Nova Scotia: John Coape Sherbrooke
- Commodore-Governor of Newfoundland: Richard Goodwin Keats
- Governor of Prince Edward Island: Charles Douglass Smith
- Governor of Upper Canada: Francis Gore

== Events ==
- The Great Migration from Europe begins.
- January – Unaware of the Treaty of Ghent, General Andrew Jackson (1767–1845) wins the Battle of New Orleans.
- February 9 – A bill to give the speaker a salary of 1,000 pounds is read.
- February 18 – The United States ratifies treaties signed in December 1814.
- March 25 – Governor George Prevost informs Parliament that then-prince regent George IV has ordered him to England to answer charges of the naval commander.
- March – Parliament allocates 25,000 pounds for a canal from Montreal to Lachine.

== Births ==
- January 10 – John A. Macdonald, politician and 1st Prime Minister of Canada, Born in Glasgow, Scotland. (died 1891)
- March 7: Thomas Wood, Member of the Legislative Council of Quebec for Bedford, died in office, 1898
- June 19 – Cornelius Krieghoff, painter (died 1872)
- September 18 – Joseph Duquet, notary in Lower Canada, executed in 1838
- October 15 – Pierre Antoine Deblois, Senator for La Salle, Quebec, died in office, 1898

== Historical documents ==
Text of "Treaty of Peace and Amity Between His Britannic Majesty and the United States of America"

"Satisfaction [after war is not great in U.S.A.] when the whole cost in lives lost, in property destroyed and in property expended" is tallied

John Quincy Adams tells Pres. Madison that larger U.S. Navy would make British better assess "the value of the Objects [in] a new War"

U.S. peacetime army includes 14 companies of infantry and riflemen stationed at Detroit and artillery companies at Niagara and Sacket's Harbor

Editorial: "The commencement of the war[...]and the manner [it was conducted in should be] engraven on the minds of[...]British North Anmerica"

William Claus of Indian Affairs department gives words of condolence to Indigenous leaders for loss of many friends and relations

Chief asks for articles necessary "to raise provisions for ourselves" and that whites (including traitors) not be allowed among Six Nations

Red Jacket asks peace between New York State and Grand River Haudenosaunee, who are "not of the same Nations only, but of the same Families"

John Norton would accept proposed pension for war service, though "all the regret [he] ever had was that [he] was not able to do more"

Pres. Madison expects returning Michilimackinac to U.S.A. will end "the confidence and hostility" of British-allied First Nations (note: "Savages" used)

Long war in Europe might spread to America because "neither party has abandoned [policies that were] the ostensible causes of the late war"

Summary of U.K.–U.S. "Commercial Treaty" includes prohibition on British trade with Indigenous people in any part of U.S.A.

Editorial: "Crowds of great and illustrious personages, in addition to gamblers, sharpers [etc.]" are in Vienna to settle European concerns

U.S. "envy [of] the superior quality of the soil" in Canada, compared to impressment of its seamen, was "stronger stimulus" to start war

"To secure us the possession of Canada," suitable vessels will be built on Great Lakes; arms and equipment for them are being prepared

Commercial/political threats from U.S.A. include future Erie Canal, fort on Lake Champlain and probable fort on St. Lawrence River

Foreword to book on British and U.S. trade says it is important to stop U.S. interference in British North American fishery and shipping

John Quincy Adams summarizes negotiation with British over their expulsion of U.S. fishers from British North American waters

Boston source notes Pres. Madison recommending only U.S. sailors crew U.S. ships, and suggests saying that 4 years ago might have averted war

John Strachan chastizes Thomas Jefferson with accounts of U.S. depredations in Upper Canada during War of 1812

"Ill-fated" Sutherlandshire sees hundreds of families emigrate to Pictou and Red River, "banished to make room for more" sheep

British and Irish settlers can get land grants of 100 acres in Upper and Lower Canada by supplying testimonials and redeemable deposits

Deserting British regulars in Upper and Lower Canada are pardoned if they surrender to officer or magistrate (does not cover militiamen)

Demise of army bills prompts praise for their benefit to "the Canadas as an easy and an abundant circulating medium" better than gold

Map: "A Plan of the Route from Halifax to the River Du Loup on the St. Lawrence," with Chaleur Bay and Minas Basin on right edge

=== Lower Canada ===
"Lower Canada has not only been exempted in a great measure from the scourge of war but actually blessed with an uncommon degree of prosperity"

"The termination of the war has already had a wonderful effect on our markets; many articles have fallen 50 pr. cent"

Letter to the editor simply and clearly alleges effect of taxation on merchants and its consequences for others in society

"The circulation of the army [bills] on equal terms as with dollars is a proof that [provincial] Bank paper would meet complete confidence"

"Vaccine inoculation" to be supported with £1,000 shared among appointed physicians in Quebec, Montreal, Trois-Rivières and Gaspé districts

Physician finds inoculation of Indigenous people led to high fever he believes "was occasioned by inebriety, their sole delight"

Eastern Townships farmers are not "sufficiently careful and neat" because uncleared land is near, labour is expensive and winters severe

Details of third infanticide since "the provision made by the Legislature for[...]reception at the Hotel Dieu" for illegitimate infants

Wounded militia members' annuity is to be raised to £15, and widows and children of members killed in war are to receive £25–100 payment

Disbanded soldiers are to be granted land to settle on, with officers receiving 200 acres and men 100 acres that must not be sold for 3 years

Editor supports settling ex-soldiers on frontiers near U.S. border as best defence against invading armies, as was proven during war

"The scene of alarm, confusion and despair may be readily imagined" - army transport catches fire at night at Quebec City

Four British regulars, kneeling on coffins by their graves, are executed for desertion before crowd of "multitudes[,] particularly of women"

Louis-Joseph Papineau's political talents: among ablest orators, "profound knowledge" in committee and "uncommon facility" in Assembly

Praise for John Molson, "one of the most valuable members of the community" in Montreal, who plans huge wharf and large ballroom facility

Note on free school in Quebec City expresses surprise that, in city of 20,000, there has been no public elementary school before now

Quebec City "seminaries of learning" praised, including Mrs. Goodman's, where young ladies excelled in geography, "use of Globes" etc.

Montreal school for "Young Ladies [teaches] Plain and Fancy Needle-Work, English Grammar, Writing, Arithmetic, Frh. Grammar [and] DANCING"

Editorial links excessive number of taverns with such crimes as theft and riot, as well as families reduced to begging and prostitution

Letter to editor hopes "every friend to humanity will now come forward[...]to free this country from the growing evil of street begging"

"Severe" examination of current state of dentistry, pointing out dentists' "neglect," aims to "heighten your ideas of its utility"

Montreal Florist Society offers prizes for methods of preventing caterpillar damage, mildew damage and "Black or Turnip-Fly"

R. Quirouet of Côte Déléry, Quebec "makes and distills all sorts of Creams, Liqueurs and Cordials for wholesale and exportation" and retail

In best-of-three one-mile heats at Chambly Race Course, Mr. Rawlin's mare takes on 1st, Capt. Blake's mare Sally and 2nd, Blake's mare Jane

English furniture for sale includes cane "sophas," mahogany and cane chairs, "wash hand stands compleat," portable desks etc.

Print: "View of Long's Farm on Lake Temiscouata at the extremity of the Portage(....)" between Rivière-du-Loup, L.C. and Edmundston, New Brunswick

=== Upper Canada ===
Assembly agrees to "deliberate upon the expediency of further continuing the suspension of the Habeas Corpus Act"

Persons suffering war damage should report to commanding officer at one of five locations around province to apply for compensation

With return of people who left U.C. during war, call comes to enforce "An act for better securing this Province against all seditious attempts"

Those who "prescribe for sick persons or practice physic, surgery or midwifery" (except female midwives) must get Board of Surgeons licence

Kinaybicoinini, Aisaince and Misquuckkey are promised £4,000 plus "one Pepper Corn" yearly rent for ca. 250,000 acres west of Lake Simcoe

Letter says Kingston has "central position, commodious harbour and [commerce with] Lower Canada," U.C. and U.S.A., but needs improvements

Proposal for Kingston school supported by $10 shares allowing subscribers to send one child per share with 10% discount in school fee

For sale: "Webster's Spelling Books, Murray's Grammar, and a Great Variety of Books for Children"

Montreal Gazette hopes Kingston - Prescott steamboat heralds links from Montreal to Upper Canada, which is seen as future continental emporium

Lake Ontario 4 ft. higher than normal and perhaps highest since 1784, with water also higher in Lake Erie and Ohio and Mississippi rivers

Kingston expresses gratitude for "indefatigable zeal, consummate prudence and incessant exertions" of Commodore J.L. Yeo during recent war

Militia members (officers and men) are to receive 6 months pay for their "important and meritorious services[...]during the late war"

Andrew Jackson is to assist establishing posts at Green Bay, Wisconsin River, Prairie du Chein and St. Anthony Falls to keep peace with Canada

Tailor new in Kingston will make greatcoat and surtout, lady's pelice, or "Habit and Riding Dress" for £1 5/-, and pantaloons for 12/6

Trick rider will perform "Surprizing Feats of Activity" including picking up small objects and dancing while riding horse at full speed

=== Nova Scotia ===
"Much, yea, very much depends instrumentally on their upbringing" - Baptist ministers offer advice on raising children

Thomas Jefferson learns plaster of Paris is quarried along coast of head of Bay of Fundy and brought to water's edge for $1/ton

Halifax bridewell is to be for, among others, "stubborn servants, apprentices and children" and anyone shirking their own or family's support

Letter says "negroes have grown up under a system of oppression and cruelty" leaving them "depressed and debased below their natural level"

Letter to editor says freed Blacks brought to Halifax in war will be hard to assimilate "for their minds are debased by slavery"

Inquest on person-of-colour Nancy Stevenson's body hears she was beaten to death "by and in the presence of" 10 people (7 of them are jailed)

Newspaper editor says coming trial "will determine whether a Free Press may exist in these Provinces" and if people may enjoy British rights

Newspaper editor mocks both people "cajoled into admiration of any idol" and "the faint tinklings of their drowsy journalists"

Shelburne, which had population of more than 12,000 not 30 years ago, is down to little more than 300 because of prosperity of rival Halifax

Library "has a few New Books" including Walter Scott's "The Lord of the Isles," Waverly and Guy Mannering and Louis Bonaparte'sMaria

Someone with letter for England has just missed ship departure when Indigenous man takes it and walks across Halifax harbour ice to ship

"Confectionary and Pastry Ware-House" sells raisins (3 kinds), figs (2 kinds), almonds and walnuts plus "500 bottles superior Mushroom Catchup"

Side-by-side ads show breadth of commerce: green olives (10 shillings per gallon) and seal oil (by pipe, hogshead, barrel or gallon)

Defeated at Waterloo, Bonaparte is rumoured to have been taken to Newfoundland, which Halifax editor believes "is likely to prove true"

Hoped-for cattle showings, "country sports and rustic simplicity" at Windsor Fair are drowned out by noisy and drunk city people

Spoof of men's clubs invites "strangers having an elastic indian-rubber-conscience" to join "the Rebel Shark's-Spear lodge of Hod Fellows"

=== New Brunswick ===
Dead judge's adult unmarried daughters are left unprovided for, and their education has not "prepared them for the trials they [will] undergo"

"Notorious" Catharine Here is sentenced to 20 lashes for stealing one gentleman's clothes, and for stealing another's watch, branding on hand

=== Newfoundland ===
MP Newport seeks to limit U.S. encroachment in Newfoundland and Labrador fisheries, which ship 1 million quintals worth £2.7 million

Since opening in 1814, charitable Newfoundland Hospital has treated 200 "distressed persons," but patients must now pay 3s/day "for Diet"

Court of Sessions orders "all dogs[...]at large in or about[...]St. John's be forthwith destroyed" because of widespread rabies

Charity sells religious books, including "that excellent summary of Christian truth and[...]practical devotion, 'The Book of Common Prayer'"

Fishery workers, "very lowest order of society," make lots of money and then spend winter in "dissipation, drunkenness, debauchery" etc.

In "Court of Oyer and Terminer," man found guilty of knowingly receiving stolen watch chain is sentenced to 14 years transportation

Unusually severe winter creates 1 foot thick ice in St. John's harbour, requiring sawing of channel to admit vessels

=== Red River ===
Selkirk's Red River prospectus reports 50–60 Europeans in main settlement and 2–3 detached settlements of formerly wandering Canadians

Selkirk's analysis of effect of North West Company domination of Europeans and Indigenous people in Red River region and elsewhere

=== Elsewhere ===
Merchant in Mackinac regrets traders bring whiskey "before the Indians have been[...]fully satisfied as to the mode of their future dependance"

Work pressure sends St. Joseph man into melancholy, writing farewell letter, hiding in woods for week, and seeming "to be in great trouble"

Instructing Indigenous peoples in HBC territory might have "a prospect of more extensive success" than elsewhere in British North America

Hudson Bay Indigenous people are "mild, affable, and charitable," but also "cunning, overreaching, and thieves" (Note: "savages" used)

Out of self-interest, "a certain association of Fur-traders" have said Red River farming is not possible, and people there are cruelly treated

Mackenzie River fur trader suggests "the natives have taken a dislike to the whites" is possible reason so few fur pelts have been brought in
