= 1762 in Canada =

- Decades: 1740s; 1750s; 1760s; 1770s; 1780s
- See also: History of Canada; Timeline of Canadian history; List of years in Canada

Events from the year 1762 in Canada.

== Incumbents ==
- French Monarch: Louis XV
- British and Irish Monarch: George III

=== Governors ===
- Governor of the Province of Quebec: Jeffery Amherst
- Colonial Governor of Louisiana: Louis Billouart
- Governor of Nova Scotia: Jonathan Belcher
- Commodore-Governor of Newfoundland: Richard Edwards

== Events ==
- November 3 – According to the preliminaries of peace, signed at Fontainebleau, England is to have, with certain West Indies, Florida, Louisiana, to the Mississippi River (without New Orleans), Canada, Acadia, Cape Breton Island and its dependencies, and the fisheries, subject to certain French interests. Spain is to have New Orleans and Louisiana, west of the Mississippi, with an undetermined Western boundary.

== Births ==
July 17 : Alexander Macdonell, Roman Catholic bishop (died 1840 in Scotland)

== Deaths ==
August 28 : Augustin de Boschenry de Drucour, governor of Isle Royale.
