= 1814 in Canada =

- Decades: 1790s; 1800s; 1810s; 1820s; 1830s
- See also: History of Canada; Timeline of Canadian history; List of years in Canada

Events from the year 1814 in Canada.

== Incumbents ==
- Monarch: George III

=== Federal government ===
- Parliament of Lower Canada: 7th (until March 22)
- Parliament of Upper Canada: 6th

=== Governors ===
- Governor of the Canadas: Robert Milnes
- Governor of New Brunswick: George Prevost
- Governor of Nova Scotia: John Coape Sherbrooke
- Commodore-Governor of Newfoundland: Richard Goodwin Keats
- Governor of Prince Edward Island: Charles Douglass Smith

== Events ==
- March 3 – The Governor refuses to suspend Chief Justices Sewell and Monk, on suggestion of one branch of the Legislature. James Stuart moves, affirming the Assembly's right to inform the Governor of irregularities, without concurrence of the council; and that the Governor has violated the Constitution.
- March 7 – The Assembly votes confidence in the Governor, apart from his advisors.
- March 8 – The council sustain their Clerk's refusal to show their minutes to a Committee of the Assembly.
- March 9 – The Assembly vote 2,000 pounds, for impeachment of Chief Justices Sewell and Monk. The council will not pass the item.
- March 17 – The Assembly resolve that the council's disallowance of a money bill is contrary to English and Canadian usage.
- May 6 – The British, under Henry Drummond, burn Fort Oswego, on Lake Ontario.
- May 25 – Louis-Joseph Papineau is unanimously elected speaker.
- July 5 – Battle of Chippewa.
- July 25 – The United States lose about 1,000 of 3,000 at the Battle of Lundy's Lane.
- August – 4,000 of Wellington's veterans have reached Canada.
- August 1 to November 5 – The Siege of Fort Erie.
- August 11 – Battle of Lake Champlain.
- August 14 – At Fort Erie, the British lose many lives, by the explosion of a magazine.
- August – General Ross takes Washington, D.C.
- August 25 – The seaboard of the United States is blockaded by ships released from European service.
- August – Envoys consider terms of peace, at Ghent.
- September 12 – An expedition of 11,000 under Governor George Prevost, supplied to winter at Plattsburg, N.Y., seeing its fleet dispersed and the enemy gathering, retreats, abandoning stores. In 1813, Wellington desired that Prevost should not abandon his policy of defence for petty advantages, to be gained by invasion, which he could not possibly maintain.
- October – Martin Chittenden, Governor of Vermont, regards the war "as unnecessary, unwise and hopeless, in all its offensive operations."
- December 22 – Treaty of Commerce, between the U.S. and Great Britain, signed at Ghent.
- December 24 – Treaty of Ghent ends the War of 1812.
- December 27 – Then prince regent George IV ratifies both treaties. One relates to boundaries and the slave trade.
- David Thompson delivers his map of western North America to partners of North West Company.
- Canadian Army bills, 1,500,000 pounds.
- Chief Justice Sewell, while in England, to defend himself, advises uniting the Canadas with one Parliament.
- The Assembly re-proposes representation in London. The Council objects. The Home Government declares that the Governor is the constitutional medium of communication between the Colony and the Imperial Government.

== Births ==
- February 10 – David Anderson, Church of England priest and bishop of Rupert's Land (d.1885)
- May 3
  - John Hamilton Gray, Premier of New Brunswick (d.1889)
  - Adams George Archibald, politician (d.1892)
- May 20 – William Steeves, politician (d. 1873)
- July 21 – Jacques Philippe Lantier, businessman, author and politician (d.1882)
- September 6 – George-Étienne Cartier, politician and statesman (d.1873)

=== Full date unknown ===
- Thomas-Louis Connolly, Archbishop of Halifax (d.1876)
- William Kennedy April 1814

== Deaths ==
- September 4 – Joseph Willcocks, diarist, office holder, printer, publisher, journalist, politician, and army officer (b.1773)

== Historical documents ==
"What constitutes the greatness and happiness of a nation:" people's spirit, education, "the political constitution under which they live" etc.

Indigenous people's "firm attachment to our interest[...]adds greatly to our means of defending and securing our Canadian possessions"

London-based charity for poor children's education in Upper and Lower Canada funds school intended for 3–400 boys in Quebec City

Cartoon: William Charles shows "Iohn" Bull as King George "baking" more ships to replace ones taken on "the Lakes," including by "Mac Do-enough"

=== War of 1812 ===
Pres. Madison informs Congress of U.S. acceptance of U.K. proposal to begin peace negotiations; but not with any relaxation of war preparations

Maryland House of Delegates fears "barbarity" of U.S. forces burning Newark, U.C. may bring "upon our coasts the most direful vengeance"

Editorial says U.S.A. must capture Kingston, Upper Canada; "anything done to the westward [is] taking the lion by the tail only"

Regarding reports of armistice, Secretary of State tells President "the affair [is] unsettled, and might terminate in nothing."

Print: Attack on Ft. Oswego, N.Y., with rescue of wounded British soldiers (foreground) and warships firing on promontory (background)

With Napoleon's fall, U.K. concludes conventions with other Allied Powers, including one keeping them (and France) out of War of 1812

Editorial: "The war must soon we think change from an offensive to a defensive one on the part of the States[....]"

"Obstinate and sanguinary contest" - Bloody Battle of Lundy's Lane leaves "vast numbers of[...]dead upon the field"

"The power of England was never displayed in Canada like at present. The troops which arrive daily are[...]brigades moved from [France]"

Royal Navy surgeon from Nova Scotia, with British forces in Washington, witnesses burning of Capitol, White House and other sites

U.S. General Macomb reports defeat of British squadron on Lake Champlain and rout of Gen. Prevost's army in Battle of Plattsburgh

John Quincy Adams and 4 other U.S. negotiators assume British are delaying peace treaty talks until after Congress of Vienna

Opinion: U.S. war aim seems to have changed from conquering Canada to preserving "that ascendency which they acquired by the peace of 1783"

Treaty of Ghent ends war and returns captured territory (including lands of First Nations at war) and seized property (including enslaved people)

"Demagogues [exploiting] hatred to England,[...]popular favour, the obsession of power, money [etc., will lead] to eternal war with England"

=== Lower Canada ===
Map: Lower Canada from Lake St. Francis to Quebec City, with districts, counties, and towns (settler and Indigenous), plus mills, roads and battles

Absence of 15,000 farming men in military and related services, troop movements and camping impede soil tillage and thus good harvests

Troop transport carrying almost 200 soldiers and 21 women and children strikes rock in Gulf of St. Lawrence, leaving 37 survivors (all men)

Editorial hopes that building Lachine Canal will draw investment from not just merchants and real estate men but "persons of every profession"

Act to establish post houses is for travellers' accommodation "and for rendering more certain the communication between different parts" of L.C.

Following death from bite of "a mad dog," court orders dogs and other animals bitten and running loose to be killed or confined by owner

"[A frigate is ordered] built at New-York to be propelled by steam. How inventive [is man to use] the powers of nature to the ends of destruction!"

Varieties of apple tree for sale in Montreal include golden "pipen," Montreal apple, Montreal rennet, Canadian rennet and Canadian nonesuch

Just in from London: "Rich figured, Shot, Twilled, coloured and Black Sarsenets, Black Silk Florentine,[...]Fashionable silk Shawls [etc.]"

Concert in Montreal includes Ignaz Pleyel "Grand Symphony," G.F. Handel song, 2 songs by Thomas Arne, and Joseph Haydn symphony (tickets: 5s)

=== Upper Canada ===
U.C. harvests have been abundant; "mixed with the evils of war, we notice a fresh spur to industry [and] an increase of commercial enterprize"

"Special Commission" at Ancaster finds 15 people guilty of treason on May 23; their punishment's effect will be "putting down the rebellion"

"When a daring spirit of anarchy and confusion seems to prevail[, it is time to teach] the lessons of obedience and subordination"

John Strachan urges "Loyal Inhabitants of this Province [to be] neither depressed nor discontented [with war's] privations and distresses"

Refugee Indigenous people want to move to Grand River, as Burlington area is "almost exhausted," with "every article of food" expensive

Act declares alien (and thus not allowed land ownership) any U.S.-born person who owns land in U.C. and has returned to U.S.A. during war

Act authorizes erection of market in York "where Butcher's Meat, Butter, Eggs, Poultry, Fish, and Vegetables shall be exposed to Sale"

Militia officers are to wear "a Scarlet Jacket with Dark Blue Facings, Yellow Buttons, Gold Lace round the Collar and Cuff [etc.]"

=== Nova Scotia ===
Committee on "the Trade, Agriculture and Fisheries" of N.S. reports 1814 concerns including supplying fish, cattle etc. to West Indies

Proclamation inviting deserters from U.S.A. is intended to encourage enslaved people to seek freedom

Newspaper reports arrival in Halifax of "a Transport with a few hundred Negroes (dead and alive)" from Chesapeake Bay

John Wentworth has land near Antigonish where New England settlers can be safely placed far from U.S. border, among "3,000 loyal Scots and others"

Surveyor General office will look into request of Thomas Paul and 10 other Mi'kmaq for land near their "choice" 1,100-acre Shubenacadie site

Baptist minister Edward Manning finds parents irreligious and neglectful of "rising generation," who are profane and ignorant

=== New Brunswick ===
Resolutions of charity for Indigenous people include providing housing and husbandry materials, and advice "with respect to their true interest"

Pres. Thomas Saumarez asks Assembly for grant to buy land for "the oak pack branch of the Melicete tribe," who suffer "want and distress"

Act to prevent killing "partridges" during breeding season (March–September) has per-bird penalty of 10s or 2 days in jail

Indigenous man asks for meadow lot near reserve, which has no natural grass, so he and family can keep cow; lot taken, but there may be others

Young Black man with wife and 3 kids and farming experience, stock and tools seeks grant of 300 acres in Kings County (200 acres allowed)

Agreement for single woman to join family in their house with room, board and washing for £45/year (raised to £55/yr if she moves out)

Fredericton military has "a great many[...]stupid married people and a majority of the single ones not very Brilliant," to "damsels" regret

Penelope Winslow's new husband lost arm in wars, but her "reign as bride has been a brilliant one" with round of dances

=== Newfoundland ===
U.K. – France treaty returns French right to fish Grand Banks and Newfoundland coast; proprietors on formerly French-occupied coast must move

St. John's townhall agrees "excessive and indiscriminate issue of Notes" is bad, and proposes bank "for the issue of a circulating Medium"

Oversight of St. John's hospital is weakened by disagreement among physicians, and one result is indulgence of quacks attached to some patients

St. John's doctor will give poor children free inoculation of cowpox virus, "for more than fifteen Years[...]found to [prevent smallpox completely]"

Royal Newfoundland Regiment, home after 9 years, have "proved equally serviceable as Soldiers and Sailors[...]both ashore and on the lakes"

Second mate and 12 crew members jump overboard to evade warship's press gang; mate drowns and crew are saved "in a very weak condition"

=== Elsewhere ===
With seal hunt providing too little sustenance, Moravian missionary says Labrador Inuit should copy settlers and fish for cod

News comes of "massacre" at Fort Nelson of Alexander Henry (who actually drowned later in 1814) and others; writer cites desperation of killers
