= 1774 in Canada =

- Decades: 1750s; 1760s; 1770s; 1780s; 1790s
- See also: History of Canada; Timeline of Canadian history; List of years in Canada

Events from the year 1774 in Canada.

== Incumbents ==
- Monarch: George III

=== Governors ===
- Governor of the Province of Quebec: Guy Carleton
- Governor of Nova Scotia: Francis Legge
- Commodore-Governor of Newfoundland: Molyneux Shuldham, 1st Baron Shuldham
- Governor of St. John's Island: Walter Patterson

== Events ==
- September 4 – Delegates from twelve colonies discuss measures for common safety, at Philadelphia. Canada and Georgia are not represented, though invited. Vermont, not being organized, is not invited.
- Lord Dunmore's War fought in Virginia between settlers and Shawnees.
- The first Continental Congress meets.
- Guy Carleton's recommendations are instituted in the Quebec Act, which introduces British criminal law but retains French civil law and guarantees religious freedom for Roman Catholics. The Act's geographical claims, and toleration of Roman Catholics, were so offensive to the 13 Colonies that it helped precipitate the American War of Independence.
- Juan Perez ordered by Spain to explore west coast; discovers Prince of Wales Island, Dixon Sound.

== Births ==
- February 4: Frederick Traugott Pursh, botanist (d.1820)
- March 13: Rose Fortune, entrepreneur (d.1864)
- August 19: Denis-Benjamin Viger, politician, businessman and politician (d.1861)
- September 5: Enos Collins, seaman, merchant, financier, and legislator (d.1871)
- September 17: William Fitzwilliam Owen, naval officer, hydrographic surveyor (d.1857)
- December 27: Brenton Halliburton, army officer, lawyer, judge, and politician (d.1860)

== Deaths ==
- July 11: Sir William Johnson, 1st Baronet, superintendent of northern Indians (b. 1715)
