= 1763 in Canada =

- Decades: 1740s; 1750s; 1760s; 1770s; 1780s
- See also: History of Canada; Timeline of Canadian history; List of years in Canada

Events from the year 1763 in Canada.

== Incumbents ==
- French Monarch: Louis XV (until February 10)
- British and Irish Monarch: George III

=== Governors ===
- Governor of the Province of Quebec: Jeffery Amherst
- Colonial Governor of Louisiana: Louis Billouart
- Governor of Nova Scotia: Jonathan Belcher
- Commodore-Governor of Newfoundland: Richard Edwards

== Events ==
With the Royal Proclamation of 1763 Lower Canada was renamed the "Province of Quebec".

- 1763–1820 The Conquest: French defeated. British take over and successfully expand fur trade from Montreal (North West Company). Much money is invested in Montreal.
- 1763–64 – Pontiac's Rebellion threatens British control of the Great Lakes region before being suppressed.
- 1763–1766: Pontiac's Rebellion, an American Indian revolt, is suppressed by the English in Canada. Ottawa Chief Pontiac (c. 1720–1769) leads an Indian uprising but the British defeat the Indians.
- Thursday February 10 – By the treaty of Paris, France cedes to Britain, Canada and all the Laurentian Islands, except St. Pierre and Miquelon.
- April 11 – Britain allows Canadians the free exercise of their religion.
- April 18 – The folk hero Marie-Josephte Corriveau was sentenced to death by a British court martial for murdering her second husband, and was hanged in Quebec City.
- December 7 – Canadians are required to swear fealty.
- Proclamation by King George III bans settlements west of the Appalachians and establishes a protected Indian Country there. White settlers ignore the boundary line – Indian raids in Pennsylvania lead to the Paxton Riots – Peaceful Conestoga Mission Indians are massacred by settlers.
- Pontiac fails to take Detroit, because of informers alerting the English to his plans; as winter approaches, his army of Indians lost faith in victory, and returned to their homes. Aware that England and France had ended both their European and American wars, Pontiac tried to start a second uprising, later counseled peace, and was killed in 1769 in Illinois by a Peoria Indian who was probably an assassin hired by the English.
- The prophetic say that the acquisition of Canada will cost England her colonies. "No longer requiring protection, they will be asked to support burdens, which their necessities have brought upon the mother country, and will answer by striking off all dependence."

== Births ==
- December 23 – John Kinzie, Fur trader from Quebec City who was responsible for the "first murder in Chicago" (d. June 6, 1828)

== Deaths ==
- April 18 – Marie-Josephte Corriveau, criminal (born 1733)
