= 1769 in Canada =

- Decades: 1740s; 1750s; 1760s; 1770s; 1780s
- See also: History of Canada; Timeline of Canadian history; List of years in Canada

Events from the year 1769 in Canada.

== Incumbents ==
- Monarch: George III

=== Governors ===
- Governor of the Province of Quebec: Guy Carleton
- Governor of Nova Scotia: Michael Francklin
- Commodore-Governor of Newfoundland: John Byron
- Governor of St. John's Island: Walter Patterson

== Events ==
- The American colonies begin their westward expansion, settling Tennessee.
- Prince Edward Island becomes a separate colony from Nova Scotia.
- April 20 – Chief Pontiac of the Ottawa is killed by a Kaskaskia Indian in Illinois.

== Births ==
- March 12: Sir Archibald Campbell, 1st Baronet, army officer and colonial administrator (d.1843)
- August 16: Peter Fidler, fur trader, mapmaker, explorer (d.1822)
- October 6: Isaac Brock, military commander, administrator of Upper Canada (d.1812)

=== Full date unknown ===
- Francis Gore, colonial administrator (d.1852)
