= 1813 in Canada =

- Decades: 1790s; 1800s; 1810s; 1820s; 1830s
- See also: History of Canada; Timeline of Canadian history; List of years in Canada

Events from the year 1813 in Canada.

== Incumbents ==
- Monarch: George III

=== Federal government ===
- Parliament of Lower Canada: 7th
- Parliament of Upper Canada: 6th

=== Governors ===
- Governor of the Canadas: Robert Milnes
- Governor of New Brunswick: George Prevost
- Governor of Nova Scotia: John Coape Sherbrooke
- Commodore-Governor of Newfoundland: Richard Goodwin Keats
- Governor of Prince Edward Island: Joseph Frederick Wallet DesBarres then Charles Douglass Smith

== Events ==
- January 22 – General Henry Proctor's 1,300 British and natives capture 495 U.S. troops, under General Winchester.
- February 7 – Raid on Elizabethtown.
- March 30 – Engagement at Lacolle.
- April 27 – Battle of York: The Americans, under Henry Dearborn, take York, but the explosion of a magazine kills many of them. Americans burn York.
- May 5 – Battle of Fort George.
- June 1 – The English frigate "Shannon" takes the "Chesapeake," in 15 minutes, off Boston.
- June 3 – The "Growler" and the "Eagle," which left Plattsburg, yesterday, are taken by the British gun-boats they pursued
- June 6 – Capture of Generals Chandler and Winder and 120 U.S. troops, at Stoney Creek, by Sgt. Alexander Fraser. The Battle of Stoney Creek is a Canadian victory.
- June 23 or June 24 – Battle of Beaver Dams is a Canadian victory, in part due to Laura Secord's famous 32 km. walk to warn Lieutenant James Fitzgibbon, who had already been warned by Natives.
- July 30 – The British destroy Plattsburg's barracks, and fire at Burlington, but avoid the reply.
- September 10 – The Battle of Put-in-Bay, Lake Erie is an American victory.
- October 5 – The Battle of Moraviantown, also known as the Battle of the Thames, is an American victory. British supporter and Shawnee Indian Chief Tecumseh is killed.
- October 25 – The Battle of Chateauguay, with mostly French-Canadian soldiers is a Canadian victory over larger numbers of American troops.
- October 26 – General Hampton, commanding 7,000 U.S. troops, ignorant of Col. Charles de Salaberry's experience, and expecting French desertions, divides his force. Part lose their way; the rest spend their strength in a maze of obstructions. De Salaberry gains the thanks of the commander-in-chief and of both Houses, and decoration by then prince regent George IV .
- November 11 – The Battle of Crysler's Farm, with English-Canadian soldiers, is a Canadian victory over larger American troops.
- December 19 – Col. Murray takes Fort Niagara.
- Quebec City has a shipping year involving 198 vessels, of 46,514 tons.
- Angus Bethune witnessed the North West Company's purchase of Fort Astoria from the Pacific Fur Company.

== Births ==
- March 5 – Casimir Gzowski, engineer (d.1898)
- June 5 – François Bourassa, farmer and politician (d.1898)
- August 4 – George Luther Hathaway, 3rd Premier of New Brunswick (d.1872)
- August 7 – John Ostell, architect, surveyor and manufacturer (d.1892)
- September 30 – John Rae, doctor and explorer (d.1893)

=== Full date unknown ===
- James Austin, businessman (d.1897)

== Deaths ==
- February 5 – William Berczy, painter, architect, author, and colonizer (b.1744)
- April 27 – Zebulon Pike, American-born general and explorer (b.1779)
- October 5 – Tecumseh (b.c1768)
- November 26 – John Craigie, businessman and political figure (b.c1757)
- December 19 – James McGill, merchant, philanthropist (b.1744)

== Historical documents ==
House of Representatives foreign relations committee acknowledges withdrawal of orders-in-council, but impressment remains cause for war

War policy in Washington not based on prudence, justice and patriotism, but desire to retain power by promoting old anti-British prejudices

"From Maine to Delaware we have one common interest[--]the preservation of commerce, which[...]southwards they are determined to destroy"

Even pro-U.S.A. British won't "surrender the maritime rights of" U.K., though Madison says "freedom of the seas must be conquered through Canada"

British government sets out its version of events and motivations that led to war with U.S.A.

People of British possessions are mere petitioners who should not assume right of people of Great Britain to criticize imperial government

Prince Regent, at meeting in London tavern to raise funds for "sufferers in British North America," notes his long residence in B.N.A. provinces

=== War of 1812 ===
Map: Canada – U.S.A. frontier, including Upper and Lower Canada on main map and New Brunswick and Nova Scotia on inset

"[In Upper Canada, the enemy's] defeats, bad pay, bad clothing, bad feeding, bad lodging, sickness, disunion and insubordination [help us.]"

Amb. John Quincy Adams tells Russian count that U.S. troops "were all too raw and unskilled in War to make much progress in Canada"

Official report of British victory at Frenchtown, Michigan under command of Col. Henry Procter and Chief Round Head

"Tory feelings[,] newspapers & pamphlets supported by foreign[ers,] mercantile credit" - John Adams accounts for opposition in U.S.A. to war

"A force is now prepared or preparing that will compel [Americans] either to keep in port or subject them to be captured if they venture out"

Comparison of British and U.S. frigates finds former are crewed by fewer men and they are less skilled (about 6/7ths are landsmen)

Congress offers bounty to "burn, sink, or destroy" British warships with "torpedoes, submarine instruments, or any other destructive machine"

British American merchants in London warn that troops currently in Upper and Lower Canada would not be enough even to defend Quebec City

Letter writer on St. Lawrence River notes British military's mobility, saying one unit got from Plymouth, England to Prescott, U.C. in 6 weeks

Broadside describes combined U.S. Army and Navy forces' capture of York, Upper Canada

U.S. commander at Fort Erie invites Canadians "anxious to obtain special protection [to come in] that they may be distinguished from the enemy"

Outnumbered British Regulars use bayonets to push through "impetuous confusion" of night fight at U.S. camp near Stoney Creek, Upper Canada

After so many U.S. disasters, "we should think that 'the most enlightened people in the world' would begin to be sick[...]of the idea of 'taking Canada'"

Lengthy account of Beaver Dams victory centres on Lt. Fitzgibbon and includes actions by specific civilians (but not Laura Secord)

Witness to British raid on Black Rock, N.Y. is captured by men of 49th Regiment amid musketry, destruction of warehouses and sharing of liquor

Editor expects "successful defence of Canada[...]but what is that? - We may [take U.S. assets, but] have we a land force equal to the undertaking?"

"Liberal translation" of declaration of war by New York-based "Six Nations of Indians[...]against the Provinces of Upper and Lower Canada"

U.S. naval commander describes Battle of Lake Erie and defeat of British squadron trying to prevent U.S. dominance of that lake

War operations "depend on the result of the contest on the Lakes [and losing them] would be far more prejudicial to us than to the Americans"

Pres. Madison decides to publicize imprisonment of some British POWs as hostages for naturalized U.S. POWs taken to Britain for trial as traitors

Lacking provisions following loss of Lake Erie supply line, British forces abandon Detroit and are defeated as they retreat up Thames River

Large U.S. invasion force on Chateauguay River is "foiled by a handful of men not amounting to a twentieth part of the force opposed to them"

After listing setbacks, New England newspaper asks what "has the least tendency towards the accomplishment of the professed object of the war"

Governor general's aide returns from Britain with assessment of "whether [ministers] consider Canada worth the expense of defending or not"

Halifax newspaper says "our affairs in Canada wear a more favorable aspect then [sic] we had a right to expect," Lake Erie defeat notwithstanding

"Cordial and able cooperation" - Headquarters report of British victory at Crysler's Farm, near Cornwall, Upper Canada

British retake Fort George, U.C. without opposition and find "the Works[...]have been restored to a respectable state of defence by the Enemy"

"This revolution in our domestic economy was well worth a war" - Thomas Jefferson says U.S. textiles are developed enough to exclude British imports

=== Lower Canada ===
Governor in Chief Prevost calls on L.C. gentry to keep resisting invaders and set inspiring example for "those who look up to and depend on them"

Defending its privilege from Assembly, Council says in history some "Representative Body" often tries to take power from "Aristocratical" body

Governor is enabled to direct Receiver General to reserve £25,000 for defence, £15,000 for militia equipment and £1,000 for militia hospital

Quebec Gazette editor says all editors print falsehoods because, "to gratify the craving appetites of[...]the public," priority outranks truth

Provincial commander praises militiamen who "would not accept of their discharge until after the [approaching] Enemy should have been repulsed"

"Cognawangha, Lake of the Two Mountains, and St. Regis Indians" are angry at not receiving support in their defeat of large U.S. force

With U.S. forces approaching, "the whole effective male population on the South side of the [St. Lawrence] River was in arms"

Grass in meadows around Quebec City is being displaced by "weed called Marguerite," with all attempts to destroy it failing

Across "the Province[...]the crops of Grain, Hay, Fruits and vegetables will be very abundant[, the weather being] uncommonly fine"

Map: Montreal and regional islands and road system, by John Melish

Molson's 140-foot-long steamboat Swiftsure has everything from automatic boiler safety valve to white Ladies' Cabin with "curtains, mirrors &c."

Fashion plate: Empire style dresses

Five guineas reward for young pointer dog "supposed to have been thrown overboard by a sailor" on army transport and "may have swam ashore"

=== Upper Canada ===
"The Canadian spirit, though wanting exercise, is by no means sunk--an alarm will[...]rouse it to the requisite exertion for meeting the occasion"

"A very few indeed, who were always suspected" - Some Upper Canadians aid U.S. invaders

French and Dutch settlers ignorant; British merchants and U.S. settlers smart; there is "considerable desire to monopolize" knowledge, riches, power

As of April 1813, farm families are living off bountiful harvest, but begin to suffer as half of farm men are called away to militia duty

"In the present situation," it is illegal to sell, barter or give "Spirituous Liquors or Strong Waters or low wines" to Indigenous people

U.C. missionary says some local Indigenous people are refugees from U.S.A.; several men are drafted into army; war brings people "of various tribes"

Fairfield mission plundered and burned by U.S. Army soldiers; Gen. Harrison is unkind, but Com. Perry helps some get to Detroit and Sandwich

Widow and children of any militia member killed while on duty (in battle or not) will receive £25 payments until youngest child turns 16

Map: Upper Canada from Sault Ste. Marie to Montreal and Lake Timiskaming to Lake Erie, with towns, counties and townships

=== Nova Scotia ===
Some are surprised at failure of U.S. forces to successfully invade; they must never "forget that our enemy is greatly our superior in numbers"

Seamen entering N.S. from U.S.A. for next 3 months will be protected from impressment and allowed to go to England or any province

Seven men (age 22–30) escape slavery, most picked up by HMS Rifleman from open boat off Chesapeake Bay and taken to Halifax

HMS Shannon brings in USS Chesapeake, whose captain dies; with cannon salute, 6 Royal Navy captains act as pallbearers to his grave

"We admire [our naval mariners and] we deeply lament their being placed in situations where there was no choice but loss of life or character"

Sudden death of two men "ought to remind us of the necessity of living as we would wish to die, then we will always be prepared to meet death"

Because 2 children have been struck (leaving 1 dead and 1 not expected to live), attention is drawn to law against disorderly riding and driving

Newly formed Royal Acadian Institution resolves to provide education "conducted on Moral and Religious principles"

Proposals invited for supplying naval hospital with port wine of good quality, to be delivered on demand in quantities of no less than one hogshead

For sale to mechanics: "moulding and bench Planes[...]Saws both German and Cast-steel[...]Coopers, Ship-Carpenters and Shoemakers Tools [etc.]"

Fishing gear for sale includes "Superfine Trout Flies adapted to the season[...]Best Patent Silk and Hair[...]Superfine Salmon-Trout Hooks"

Dancing instructor teaches "Minuets, Cottillons, Contra-Dances, Hornpipes, jigs, Strathspeys, Reels, Medlies, Passe-pies [and] Ballet dances"

Music teacher advertising private vocal lessons assures ladies who lack confidence that it will be gained "with the most pleasing facility"

"Perspective Box [with two] magnifying Glass Sights" contains 90 coloured prints and specimens from more than 50 genera of animals and plants

Acadian Recorder says "our fashionable females[...]wearing a machine called a 'CORSET' [follow a] ridiculous and pernicious practice"

=== New Brunswick ===
White males (age 16–60) inhabiting or resident in N.B. are to enrol for service in militia (officials and certain occupations exempted)

Excerpt of journal by Lt. John LeCouteur, 104th Regiment of Foot as it marches from Fredericton through Saint John River valley to Lower Canada

"Many of the poor Ministers of Christ [are] laboring in the field to gather food for their families" but neglecting their ministry duties

Thomas Wetmore asks Ward Chipman if there can be some fund (government or private) for pork for group of "very poor" Indigenous people

Chief Andrew Julian and 4 brothers, Mi'kmaq of Northumberland County, sell lot and cove on Northwest Miramichi River for £30

Unmarried 26-year-old Black man of Sussex Parish, known for industry and sobriety, petitions for 200-acre lot for family he expects to have

Of 6 Miller family children, 4 are dead and 1 is dying; mother is "almost stupified with grief and [may not recover from] these repeated shocks"

Old "Mr. Ebenezer Spicer of Sussex Vale [drowned when] a whirlpool caught the oar with which he was steering and threw him out of the boat"

"A small privateer of 2 guns was ran [sic] on shore near Bailey's Mistake and destroyed by the boats of [H.M. sloop] Ratler

=== Newfoundland ===
Despite imposed restraints, Newfoundland's enterprising people have increased in numbers, commerce and wealth to point colonial government is needed

Call for kindness toward Indigenous people, drawing them "into habits of intercourse and trade," and £100 offered for "firm and settled" successes

Promising "abundance of fine Beef, Mutton, and every luxury which a lusty and loyal Soldier should enjoy," Royal Newfoundland Regiment enlists

Plague outbreak on Malta, which continues "with unabated violence," means all ships coming from Mediterranean ports to St. John's must quarantine

"Exhilarating" - Laying of "Foundation Stone" for Newfoundland hospital in St. John's, "[...]the first public Hospital in this Island"

"In the existing season of privation and suffering," Society of Merchants is forgoing their annual dinner to donate £29 to poor

Auctioneer's 21s lottery tickets give chance to win something worth at least 36s, such as watches, pianoforte, "sopha" and china set

Former Oxford scholar will take in "Six young Gentlemen from the age of six" to be prepared for "any of the great Schools in England"

St. John's Subscription Library is missing many books, including Vicar of Wakefield, Gil Blas, Tom Jones and Tristram Shandy

=== Elsewhere ===
British writer-editor discusses differences between U.S. and U.K. with Pres. Madison, including latter's vision of conquered Canada

John Jacob Astor asks that U.S. Navy frigate go to mouth of Columbia River to protect American Fur Company (described in detail) from British

John Jacob Astor worries about war's effect on Columbia River enterprise (with history of its founding)

Saint John ship, semi-submerged by hurricane on way to Jamaica, finds way (without compass) back to New Brunswick only to break up on rocks

Upper-class woman in Philadelphia wants to use New York – Montreal connection (through Boston merchant) to write to her daughters in Montreal

Captured U.S. seaman reveals herself as female and tells story of her shipwreck, disguise, and service on privateer (earning about $200)
