= Chagnon (surname) =

Chagnon is a surname. Notable people with the surname include:

- Paschal Chagnon (1765–1825), Canadian merchant and political figure
- Leon Chagnon (1902–1953), American professional baseball pitcher
- André Chagnon (1928–2022), Canadian businessman and philanthropist
- Napoleon Chagnon (1938–2019), American anthropologist
- Jacques Chagnon (born 1952), Canadian politician
- Christian Chagnon (1956–2021), Canadian handball player
- Marcel (singer) (born Marcel Chagnon, 1975), American country singer
- Frédéric Chagnon (born 1992), Canadian football player
- Cheryle Chagnon-Greyeyes, Alberta politician
