= Benjamin Green (merchant) =

American merchant, judge and politician

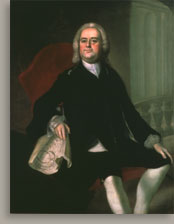
- 1756 portrait of Green by Joseph Blackburn

Governor of Nova Scotia
- In office 1766
- Preceded by: William Campbell
- Succeeded by: Michael Francklin

Personal details
- Born: 1 July 1713 Salem, Massachusetts, Great Britain
- Died: 14 October 1772 (aged 59) Halifax, Nova Scotia, Great Britain
- Resting place: Halifax, Nova Scotia, Canada
- Children: 2 daughters

Benjamin Green (July 1, 1713 – October 14, 1772) was an American merchant, judge and politician. He served as administrator for Nova Scotia in 1766 and from 1771 to 1772.

== Early life ==
He was born in Salem Village (later Danvers, Massachusetts), the son of the Reverend Joseph Green and Elizabeth Gerrish, and entered business with his brothers in Boston. In 1737, he married Margaret Pierce.

== Career ==
He was secretary to William Pepperrell, who led the attack against Louisbourg in 1745, and served as treasurer for the forces from New England and secretary for the council that administered Louisbourg after its capture. In 1749, he went to Halifax, where he was named to Edward Cornwallis's Nova Scotia Council and also served as naval officer. (Greene named his son Edward Cornwallis in honour of the governor.) Green was also judge in the vice admiralty court; he resigned in 1753. In 1750, he became secretary to the council and provincial treasurer. Green was named a justice of the peace in 1760. While in England to assist in auditing the accounts of Peregrine Thomas Hopson, he had to defend himself against charges of assigning contracts to Malachy Salter in exchange for a share in the profits. He was reprimanded but allowed to retain his posts. During his term as administrator in 1766, he was criticized by the provincial assembly for not following the correct procedures for dealing with the provincial finances. Green resigned his post as provincial treasurer in 1768, citing poor health.

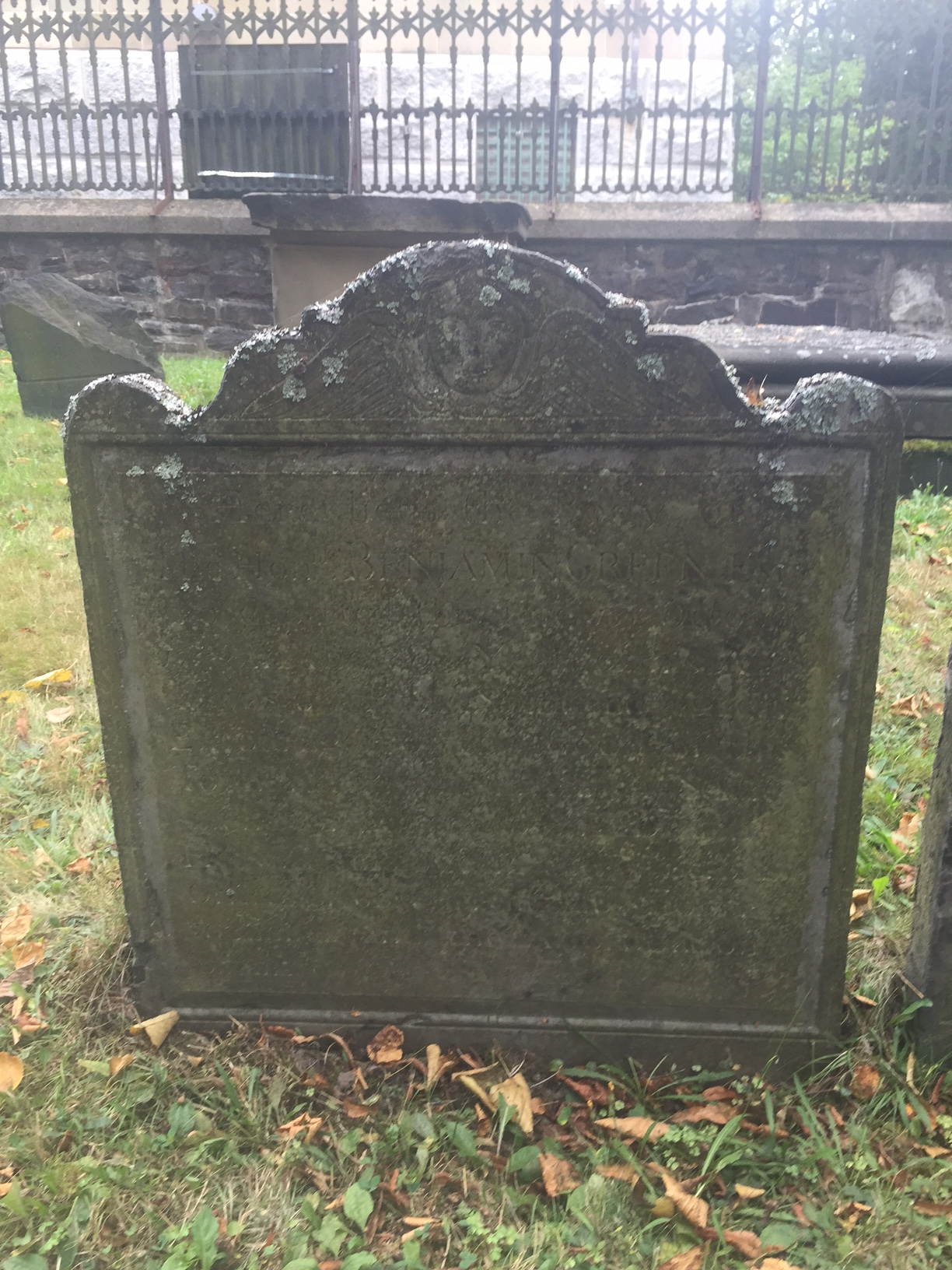
Benjamin Greene, Old Burying Ground (Halifax, Nova Scotia), only known gravestone of Cornwallis' Nova Scotia Council

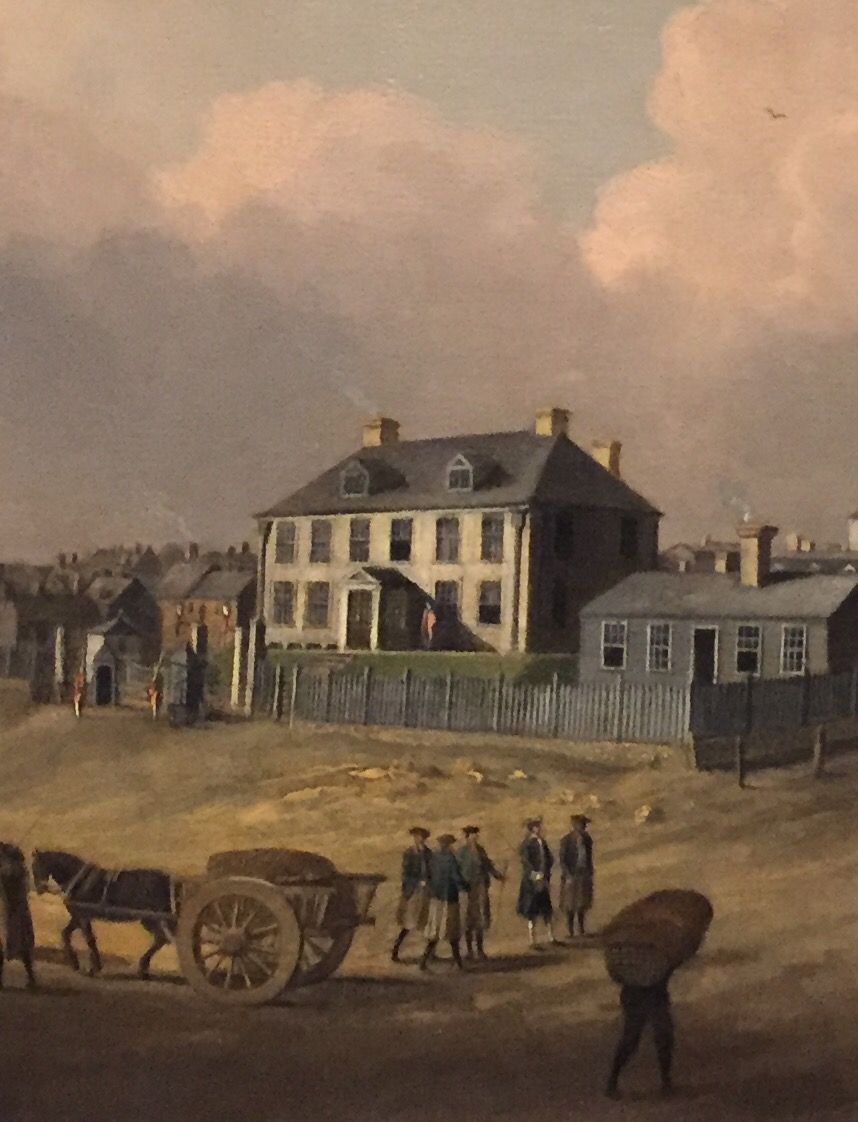
Governor Green's residence (built 1749). (Located on the site of Province House, which still is furnished with his Nova Scotia Council table)

== Death and Family ==
He died in Halifax at the age of 59 and is buried in the Old Burying Ground (Halifax, Nova Scotia). An audit of the provincial accounts following his death found them deficient.

Two of his daughters married the Newton brothers: John Newton (Nova Scotia politician) and Henry Newton (politician).

== Legacy ==
- namesake of Green Street, Halifax
- Green kept a Journal for William Pepperrell of the Siege of Louisburg (1744): Lincoln, Charles Henry, ed. (1911). "The Journal of Sir William Pepperrell kept during the Expedition Against Louisbourg, Mar. 24 - Aug. 22, 1745". Proceedings of the American Antiquarian Society. New Series. Vol. XX. Worcester, Massachusetts: Worcester, Mass., American Antiquarian Society. pp. 133–183.
- Great-grandfather of Major Parker, of the Sebastopol Monument

== Links ==
- A sermon, occasioned by the death of Mrs. Margaret Green; consort of the late Honourable Benjamin Green, esq; delivered at Halifax, in the province of Nova-Scotia, February 1st, 1778 (Halifax, [1778?])

== See also ==
- Nova Scotia Council
- List of lieutenant governors of Nova Scotia
- 5th General Assembly of Nova Scotia
