= Charlottetown Police Service =

Agency overview
- Formed: August 17, 1855
- Annual budget: $12.4 m CAD (2023)

Jurisdictional structure
- Operations jurisdiction: Canada

Operational structure
- Headquarters: Charlottetown, Prince Edward Island
- Sworn members: 70
- Unsworn members: 10
- Elected officer responsible: The Honourable Bloyce Thompson, Minister of Justice and Public Safety and Attorney General
- Agency executive: Brad MacConnell, chief of police

Website
- Official website

Charlottetown Police Service (CPS) is the police service for the city of Charlottetown, Prince Edward Island, Canada. As of 2023 the service employs 70 police officers and 10 civilians, and has a budget of $12.4 million. It is headed by Chief Brad MacConnell.

== Programs and services ==
CPS programs and services includes:

- Accident Reconstruction Team
- Administration
- Bylaw Enforcement
- Court Office
- Criminal investigation branch
- Drug Investigations
- Priority Tactical Response and Containment Team (replaces Emergency Response Team)
- Identification Section (Forensics)
- Major Crime Unit
- Operational Records Clerks
- Parking Section
- Property
- Street Crime Unit
- Tactical Troop (Riot squad)
- Telecoms Section
- Traffic section
- Uniform Patrol

The force has also been involved in United Nations peacekeeping and the National Weapons Enforcement Support Team (NWEST).

== History ==
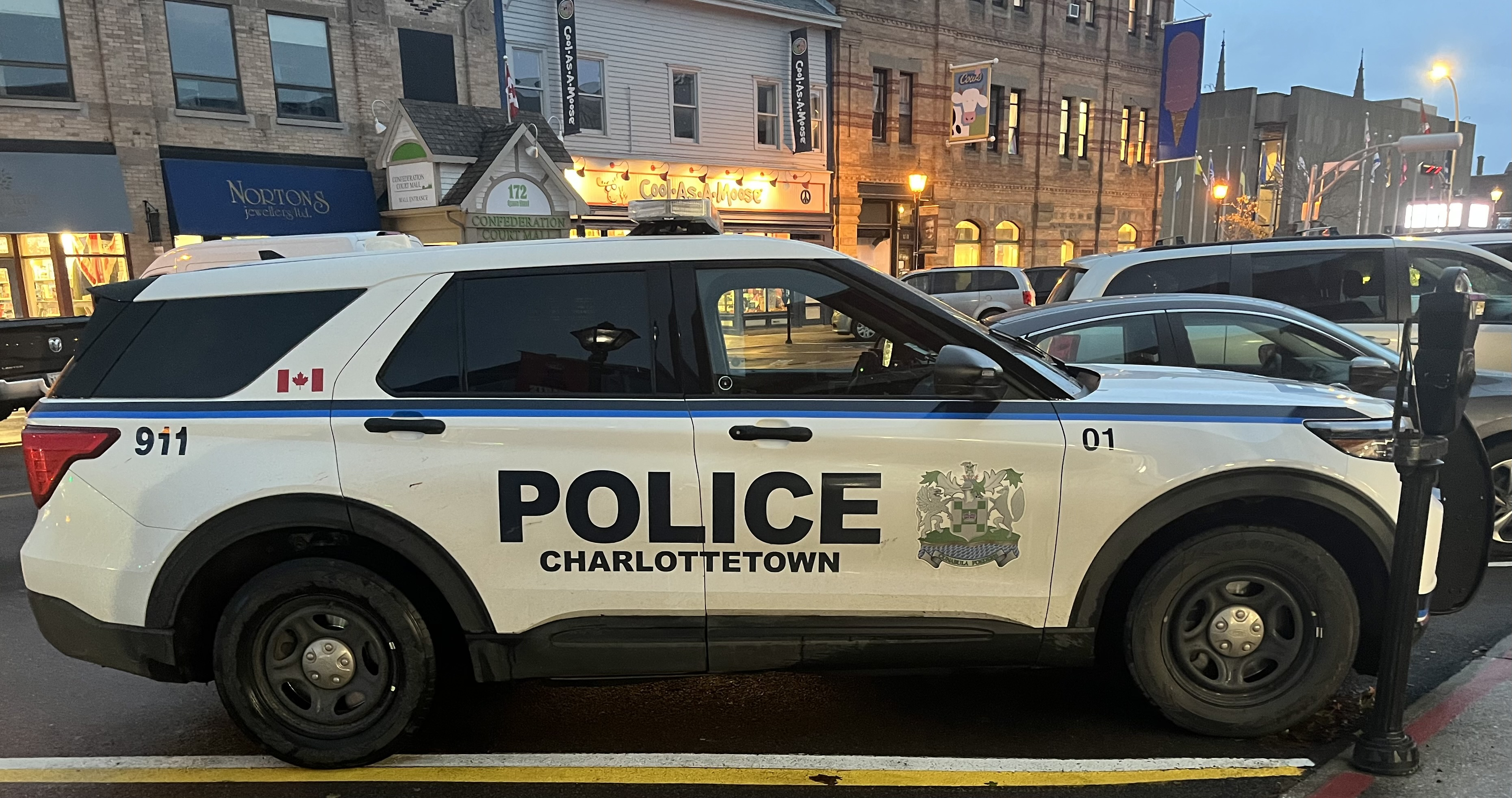
A police vehicle in Downtown Charlottetown

In 1973 Charlottetown City Council voted for all police officers to carry firearms.

In 2019, it was reported that while the rest of the country's police services were struggling to boost recruitment, such as the RCMP with as many as a thousand vacancies, the CPS was received applications from across the country and around the world, with a 100:1 ratio in applicants to open positions. On October 29, 2021, the service added seven new officers, the largest hiring in 26 years.

=== Controversy ===
An unnamed adult female lodged a complaint with the service in 2018 alleging that on multiple occasions, she had engaged in sexual activities with an officer in his police vehicle while on duty. She further alleged that on multiple occasions, the officer ignored requests for back-up from other officers over the radio so that they could continue their assignations. In her complaint, she also claimed that he was not the only officer she had sexual encounters with, while on duty in police vehicles. The service announced it had launched an internal investigation for discreditable conduct.

=== Agency Executive ===
The service is currently led by a Chief of Police, prior to that it was led by a City Marshal.

==== Chiefs of Police ====
- Brad MacConnell, 2021–2025
- Paul Smith, 1994–2021
- Don Webster, 1988-1994
- Charles Ready, 1979-1988
- Don Saunders, 1974-1979
- Sterns Webster, 1963-1974
- C.W. MacArthur, 1949-1963
- A. Birtwhistle, 1927-1949

==== City Marshals ====
- Wallace Shaw, 1925-1927
- Charles Cameron, 1888-1925
- George Passmore, 1880-1888
- Thomas Flynn, 1869-1880
- Angus MacLeod, 1862-1869
- James Evans, 1857-1862
- Michael O'Hara, 1855–1857
