= Gueguen =

Gueguen is a French surname. Notable people with the surname include:

- Frédéric Gueguen (born 1970), French footballer
- Michel Gueguen (born 1951), French modern pentathlete
- Raoul Gueguen (born 1947), French modern pentathlete

== See also ==
- Mount Guéguen, a mountain of Antarctica
- Guéguen Point, a headland of Antarctica
