= Jacques Archambault (politician) =

Canadian politician

Jacques Archambault (September 15, 1765 – December 31, 1851) was a Canadian politician and farmer in Lower Canada. He represented Leinster in the Legislative Assembly of Lower Canada from 1810 to 1814.

He was born in Saint-Pierre-du-Portage, the son of Pierre Archambault and Marie-Josephte Gauthier. Archambault settled on a farm in Saint-Roch in 1783. In the same year, he married Véronique Debussat, dit Saint-Germain. In 1805, he was named a justice of the peace for Montreal district. He served as a captain in the militia during the War of 1812. Archambault also served on the school board for Saint-Roch-de-l'Achigan and as a commissioner for the summary trial of minor causes. He did not run for reelection to the assembly in 1814.
