= Paschal Chagnon =

Canadian politician

Paschal Chagnon (April 6, 1765 – February 1, 1825) was a merchant and political figure in Lower Canada. He represented Surrey in the Legislative Assembly of Lower Canada from 1808 to 1809.

He was born in Verchères, the son of Jean-Baptiste Chagnon and Marie-Françoise Pinault. Chagnon established himself in business at Verchères. He served as lieutenant in the militia, later reaching the rank of captain. He was married twice: first to Josette Sénécal in 1787 and then to Françoise Dussault in 1813. Chagnon did not run for reelection to the assembly in 1809. He died in Verchères at the age of 59.
