= Lord William Campbell =

Royal Navy officer, politician and colonial administrator

Captain Lord William Campbell
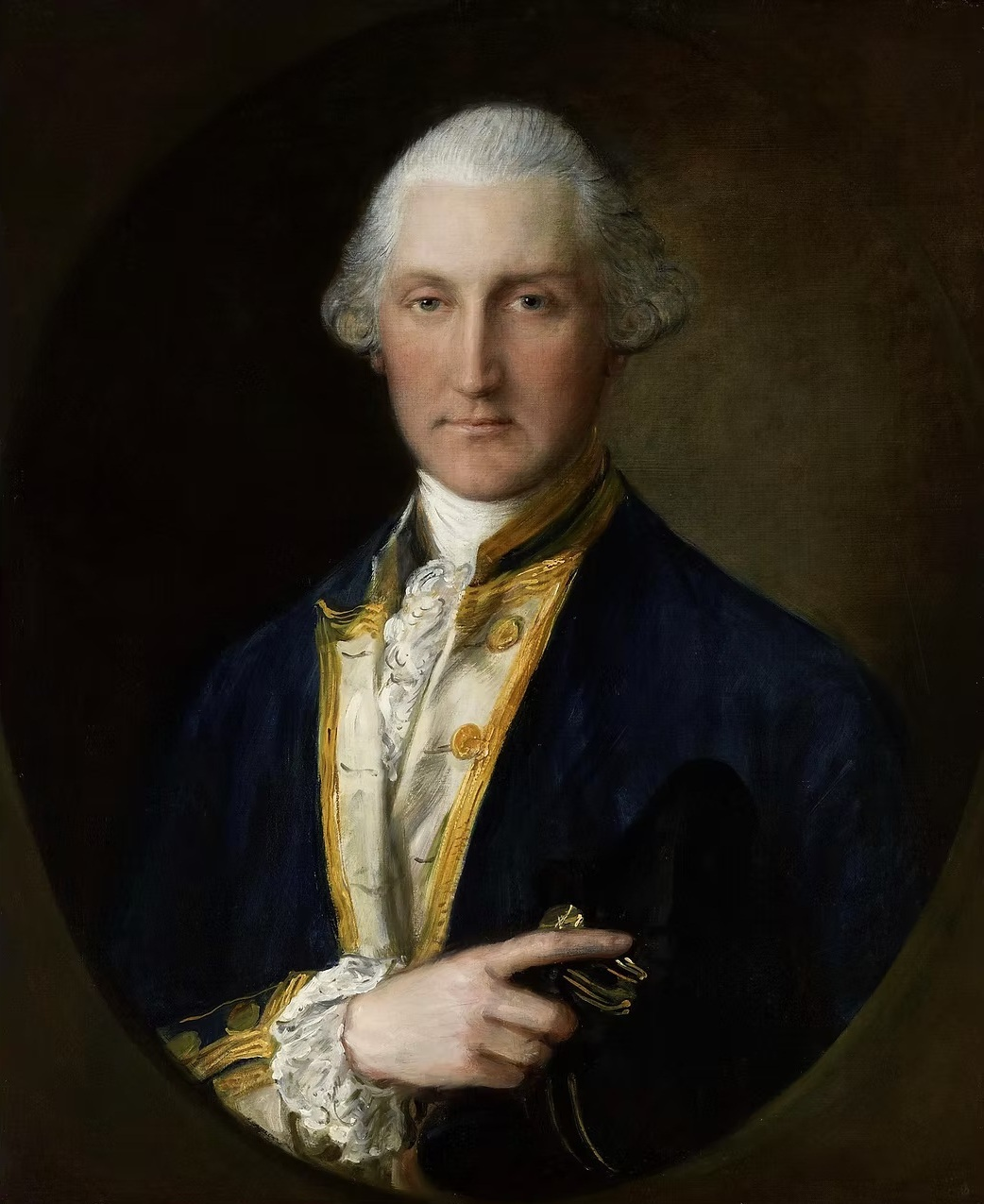
- Portrait by Thomas Gainsborough, c. 1775

Governor of Nova Scotia
- In office October 1766 – October 1773
- Monarch: George III
- Preceded by: Montague Wilmot
- Succeeded by: Benjamin Green (acting)

Governor of South Carolina
- In office 18 June 1775 – 15 September 1775
- Monarch: George III
- Preceded by: William Bull II (acting)
- Succeeded by: Henry Laurens (as President of the South Carolina Committee of Safety)

Military service
- Allegiance: Great Britain
- Branch/service: Royal Navy
- Years of service: 1752–1778
- Rank: Captain
- Battles/wars: Seven Years' War; American War of Independence; Battle of Sullivan's Island

Captain Lord William Campbell (11 July 1730 – 4 September 1778) was a Royal Navy officer, politician and colonial administrator who served as the governor of Nova Scotia from 1766 to 1773.

== Life ==
He was born into a Scottish family loyal to the House of Hanover. His parents were John Campbell, 4th Duke of Argyll and Mary Campbell of Mamore. From 1752 to 1760, he served in the Royal Navy in India, rising to the rank of captain in August 1762. In 1762, because of the Seven Years' War, he was scheduled to serve in America. He met and married Sarah Izard from South Carolina in 1763. His brother-in-law was a future American rebel and member of the Second Continental Congress, Ralph Izard. In 1764, they returned to Britain where he became a member of Parliament, representing the family seat in Argyllshire. In 1766, he was appointed Governor of Nova Scotia, a position he held until 1773. During this period, he purchased a slave plantation on the Savannah River.

In June 1775, at the outbreak of the American Revolutionary War, Campbell became the last British governor of South Carolina, a position for which he had lobbied hard, because his wife was from South Carolina. Charged with bringing in the reins on the colony's revolutionaries, Campbell first decided to ignore the newly established Provincial Congress. The Provincial Congress was created in January 1775 in Charles Town by former members of the South Carolina House of Commons as a separate ruling government independent of British authority and influence. Knowing the great rift between the aristocratic low-country and the backwoodsmen commoners of the backcountry, Campbell distributed pamphlets in mass numbers to backcountry citizens. The pamphlets stated that Charlestonians kept lying and that the Provincial Congress could not be trusted.

Campbell soon realized he could no longer reside and govern in safety in Charles Town. Intimidation from Patriots resulted in public hangings, assaults, and raids on the homes and businesses of suspected Loyalists. One home raided included that of Henry Laurens, who would go on to become the third President of the Second Continental Congress. Patriots were not afraid to intimidate or attack British officials, and several officials even fled the city to escape further persecution. In 1775, Campbell fled his home at 34 Meeting Street in Charles Town on a British warship, HMS Tamar, and returned to England. His departure marked the beginning of revolution in South Carolina and the end of British governance of the province. In 1776, during the Battle of Sullivan's Island, he was wounded in action while aboard Sir Peter Parker's flagship, HMS Bristol. He never fully recovered, and died of its effects two years later at age 48. He was buried in England.

== Literature ==
- The History of South Carolina in the Revolution, (Volume I, 1901)
- The Carolinian, Rafael Sabatini (1924)

== Bibliography ==
- Coghlan, Francis A. (1979). "Campbell, Lord William". In Halpenny, Francess G. (ed.). Dictionary of Canadian Biography. Vol. IV (1771–1800) (online ed.). University of Toronto Press.

Parliament of Great Britain
Preceded by Dugald Campbell	Member of Parliament for Argyllshire; 1764 – 1766	Succeeded by Robert Campbell
Political offices
Preceded by Montague Wilmot	Governor of Nova Scotia; 1766-1773 with Benjamin Green (1766 and 1771-1772); Michael Francklin (1766-1773)	Succeeded by Francis Legge
