= Montague Wilmot =

British colonial Governor of Nova Scotia

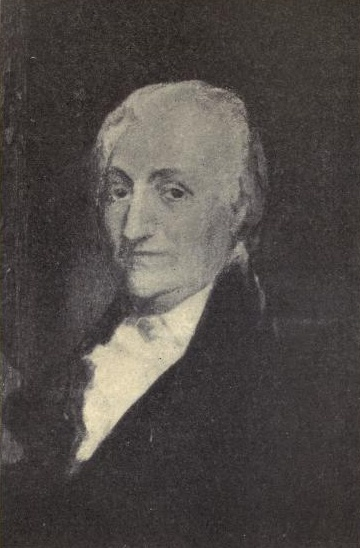
Montague Wilmot

Montague Wilmot (c. 1709/1710 – died May 23, 1766) was an 18th-century British colonial Governor of Nova Scotia.

== Early life ==
Little is known of Wilmot's origins, such as his exact place of birth, although he was born in England. His father was a physician to the Prince of Wales and his mother was a Montagu; Wilmot's uncle was George Montagu, 1st Earl of Halifax.

It was with the help of these connections that Wilmot probably became an army officer, serving in places such as Gibraltar in 1745.

== Army officer ==
It was Wilmot's regiment in Gibraltar that was ordered to travel to Louisbourg, to relieve the garrison of Louisbourg, which had been surrendered by the French in 1745.

In 1749, Louisbourg having been handed back to the French, the British troops sailed down to Halifax, Nova Scotia, to come under the command of Governor Edward Cornwallis. While it is apparent that many of the troops of Gibraltar left Nova Scotia soon after, Wilmot stayed in Nova Scotia, having achieved the rank of major.

In 1755, the British were successful in laying siege to Fort Beauséjour, and with war having officially broken out, Governor Charles Lawrence sent Wilmot, then a lieutenant-colonel, up to Fort Cumberland (Beauséjour's new name), to act as its commander. In December 1755, he was named to the Nova Scotia Council.

In 1758, Wilmot was in command of a brigade in Louisbourg, and in 1762 was sent to Quebec.

== Governor of Nova Scotia ==
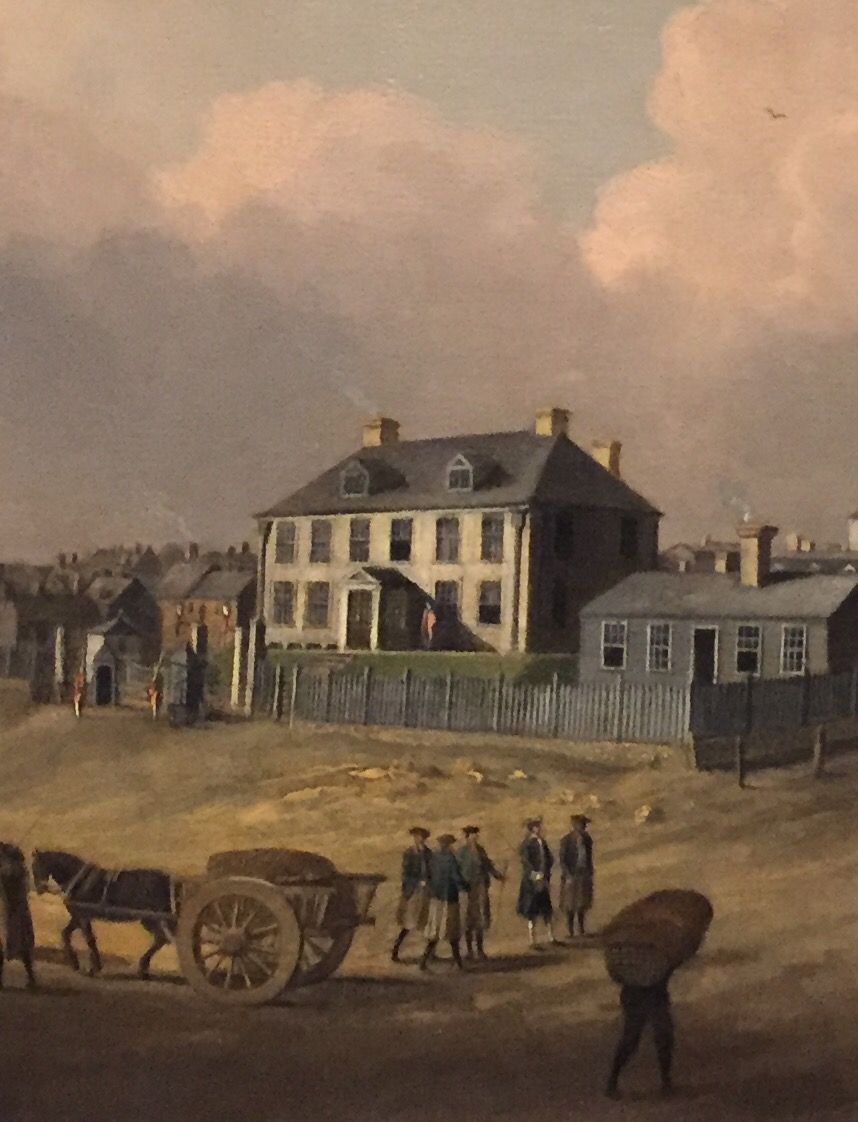
Governor Wilmot's residence (built 1749). (Located on the site of Province House, which still is furnished with his Nova Scotia Council table)

It was in Quebec, in 1763, where Wilmot received his appointment as Lieutenant-Governor of Nova Scotia, succeeding Jonathan Belcher.

Only one year later, in May 1764, Wilmot was appointed governor of Nova Scotia following the resignation of Henry Ellis. It was not a grand time for such an appointment. One example of the province's problems at the time was that Nova Scotia was suffering from great debts and deficits.

By the time of his appointment, Wilmot's health was already deteriorating, he having blamed the climate for his sickness. In fact, he had sent an application to ask for a return to the England, but never received a reply.

Governor Wilmot died in 1766 after suffering from a reportedly bad winter. An elaborate funeral service was held for him in Halifax. He is buried in the crypt of St. Paul's Church (Halifax)).

== Legacy ==
- Fort Vieux Logis was renamed Fort Montague
- Wilmot, Nova Scotia
- Montague River on Prince Edward Island, from which the town of Montague takes its name.
- Wilmot Town (Canso, Nova Scotia)
- Montague St., Lunenburg, Nova Scotia
- Montague St., Saint Andrews, New Brunswick

Political offices
Preceded by Jonathan Belcher (acting)	Governor of Nova Scotia; 1764-1766	Succeeded by Lord William Campbell
