= John Le Marchant (British Army officer, born 1803) =

British Army general and colonial administrator

Lieutenant-General Sir John Le Marchant GCMG KCB
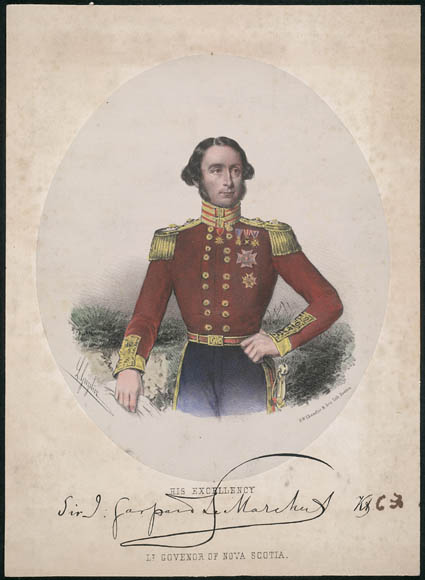
- Born: 1803
- Died: 6 February 1874 (aged 71); Pimlico, London, England
- Military career
- Allegiance: United Kingdom
- Branch: British Army
- Rank: Lieutenant-General
- Commands: Madras Army
- Awards: Knight Grand Cross of the Order of St Michael and St George; Knight Commander of the Order of the Bath

Viceregal styles of Sir John Le Marchant
- Reference style: His Excellency
- Spoken style: Your Excellency

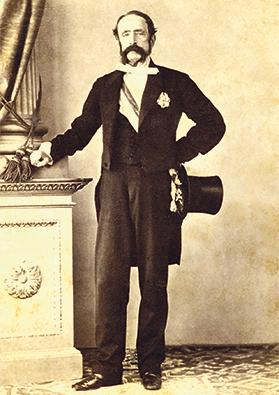
Le Marchant as Governor of Malta (1858–1864); photo by Leandro Preziosi

Lieutenant-General Sir John Gaspard Le Marchant GCMG KCB (1803–1874) was a British Army officer and governor of Newfoundland from 1847 to 1852. He later became the Lieutenant Governor of Nova Scotia (1852–1858) and Governor of Malta (1858–1864).

== Biography ==
Le Marchant was the son of Major-General John Le Marchant and the younger brother of Sir Denis Le Marchant, 1st Baronet, and was educated at High Wycombe Royal Grammar School and the Royal Military College, Sandhurst.

In 1820, at the age of seventeen, he was commissioned into the 10th Foot as an ensign. In 1821 he transferred to the 57th Foot as a lieutenant and later transferred to the 98th Foot, in which he was promoted major. In 1835 he became adjutant-general of the British Auxiliary Legion in Spain with the rank of brigadier-general. He transferred to the 20th Foot in 1837, the 99th Foot as lieutenant-colonel in 1839, the 85th Foot in 1845, and the 11th Foot as colonel in 1862, holding the latter post until his death.

He was appointed as a Knight of the Order of Charles III by Isabella II, Queen of Spain in 1838, and was knighted and granted permission to use his Spanish knighthood in Britain. He was also a Knight Commander of the Military Order of St Ferdinand.

In 1847 he reluctantly accepted the governorship of Newfoundland. Le Marchant was opposed to the idea of responsible government and condemned local merchants for amassing wealth in the Colony and then returning to England. After the fire of 1846 funds were collected for the victims and Le Marchant, acting upon Robert Law's recommendation that no further money be given to victims, then directed funds to the repair of public buildings and construction of roads in St. John's and the outports.

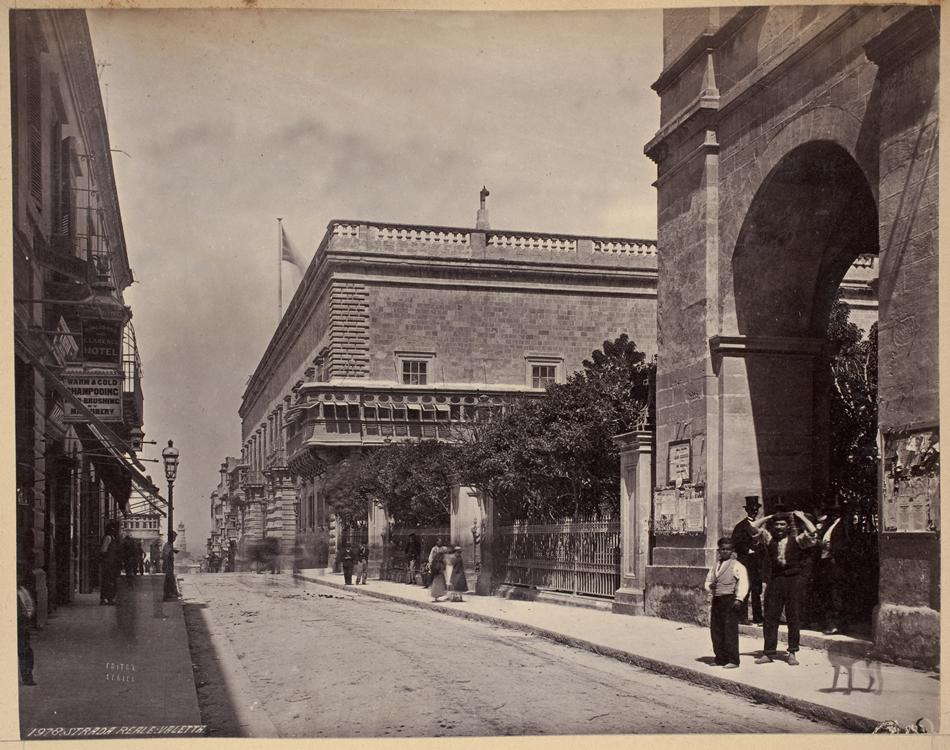
Valletta's Piazza Tesoreria as a closed orchard during the Governorship of John Le Marchant, 1858–1864; photo by Francis Frith

He then served a term as Lieutenant Governor of Nova Scotia (1852–58) and as Governor of Malta in 1858–64. While in Malta, he had some portrait photos taken of him and his daughters by Maltese photography pioneer Leandro Preziosi. He also had Valletta's then Piazza Tesoreria fenced off as a private orchard, and he had the statue of António Manoel de Vilhena moved from Fort Manoel to the centre of it in 1858. The square was reopened to the public in the 1870s.

In 1865 Le Marchant was appointed Commander-in-Chief of the Madras Army before he retired in 1868.

== Legacy ==
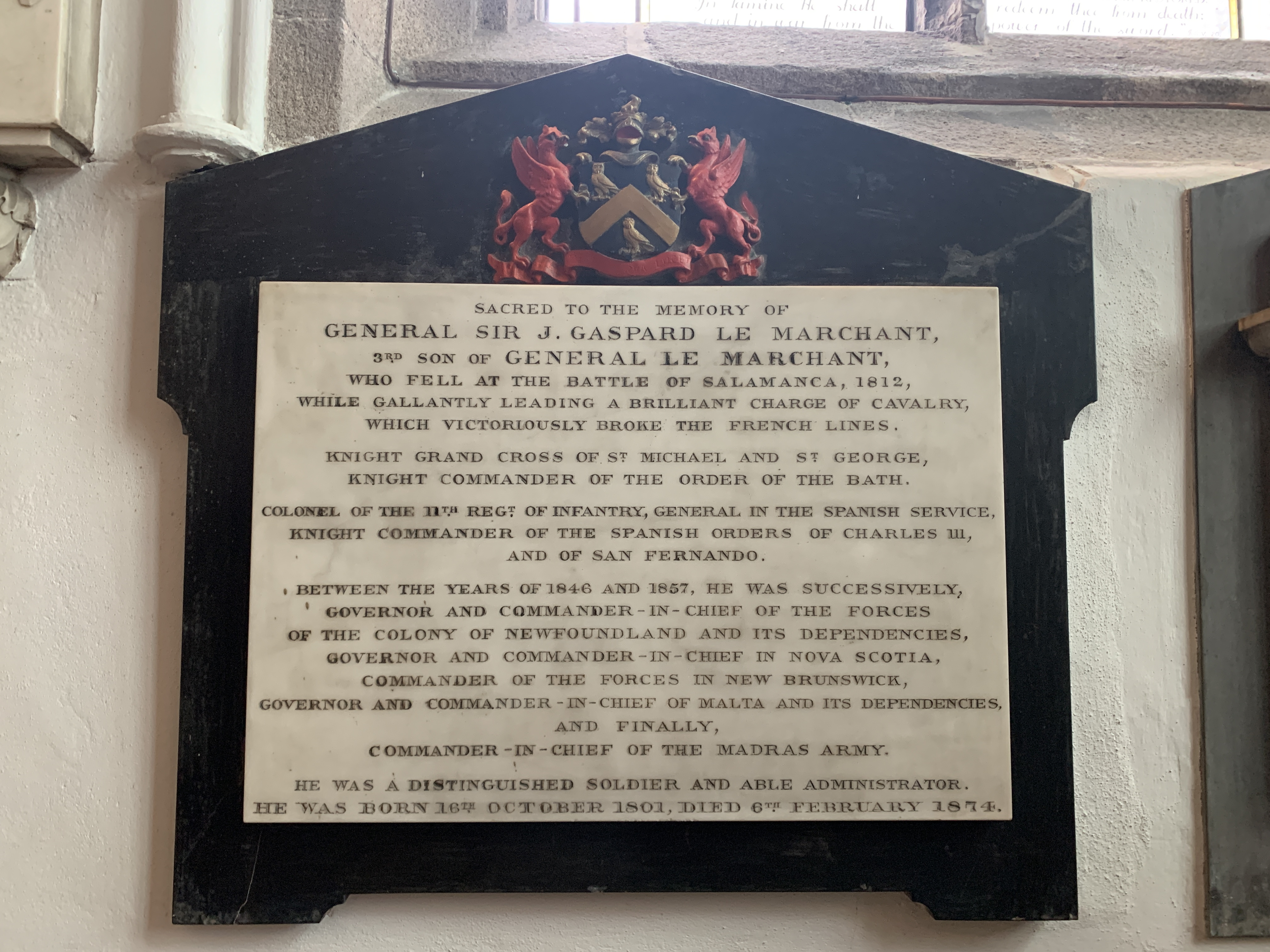
Memorial in Town Church, Guernsey

- Le Marchant Road, a prominent street in St. John's, Newfoundland and Labrador is named in his honour.
- LeMarchant Street in Halifax, Nova Scotia is named in his honour.
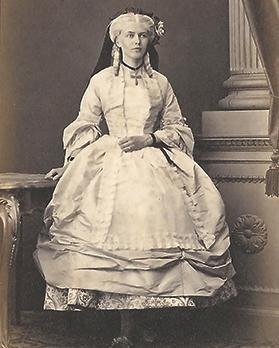
His first daughter Emily, 1864

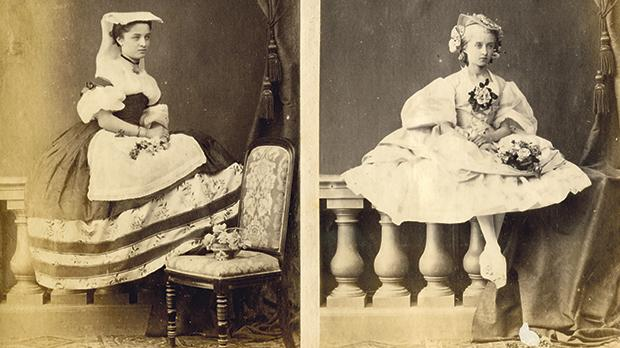
His daughters Blanche and Clementina, 1864

== See also ==
- List of people of Newfoundland and Labrador
- Le Marchant Baronets

Government offices
Preceded by Sir John Harvey	Governor of Newfoundland; 1847–1852	Succeeded by Ker Baillie Hamilton
Preceded by John Bazalgette	Lieutenant-Governor of Nova Scotia; 1852–1858	Succeeded by Earl of Mulgrave
Preceded by Sir William Reid	Governor of Malta; 1858–1864	Succeeded by Sir Henry Storks
Military offices
Preceded by Sir Hope Grant	C-in-C, Madras Army; 1865–1867	Succeeded by William McCleverty
Preceded by William George Cochrane	Colonel of the 11th (the North Devonshire) Regiment of Foot; 1862–1874	Succeeded by Sir Francis Seymour
