= John Holl =

Canadian politician

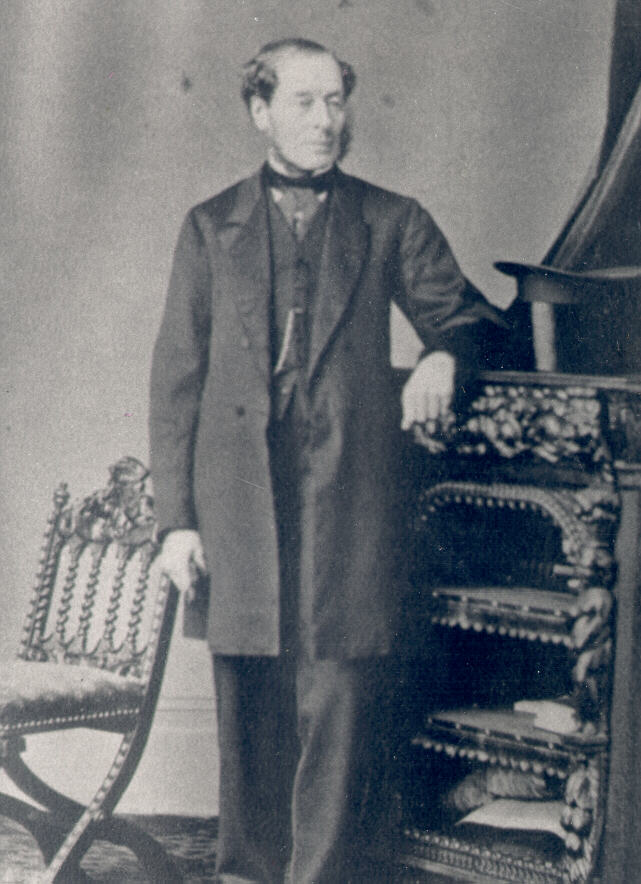
John Holl

John Myrie Holl (16 August 1802 – 6 April 1869) was a Prince Edward Island politician. He was born in England and likely immigrated to island in 1836 acquiring several hundred acres of property which he named "Kenwith" after his family's estate in Devon, England. Holl was appointed to the legislative council in 1840 by governor Charles Augustus FitzRoy. Responsible government came to the island in 1851. In 1853 the Liberal government of the colony's first premier, George Coles, was defeated in the general election and was forced to resign in early 1854 when it could not command the support of the House of Assembly which now had a Conservative majority. Holl was appointed Premier despite the fact that he sat in the appointed legislative council rather than the elected House of Assembly. Due to changes in the franchise which broadened the right to vote from property owners to universal male suffrage a new election was held in June 1854 and the Liberals again won power and were able to form a government when the legislature resumed in 1855 ending Holl's few months as Premier. Holl continued to sit in the legislative council until leaving the island in 1856.
