= Charles Henry Darling =

British Army officer and colonial administrator

The Right Honourable Sir Charles Darling KCB
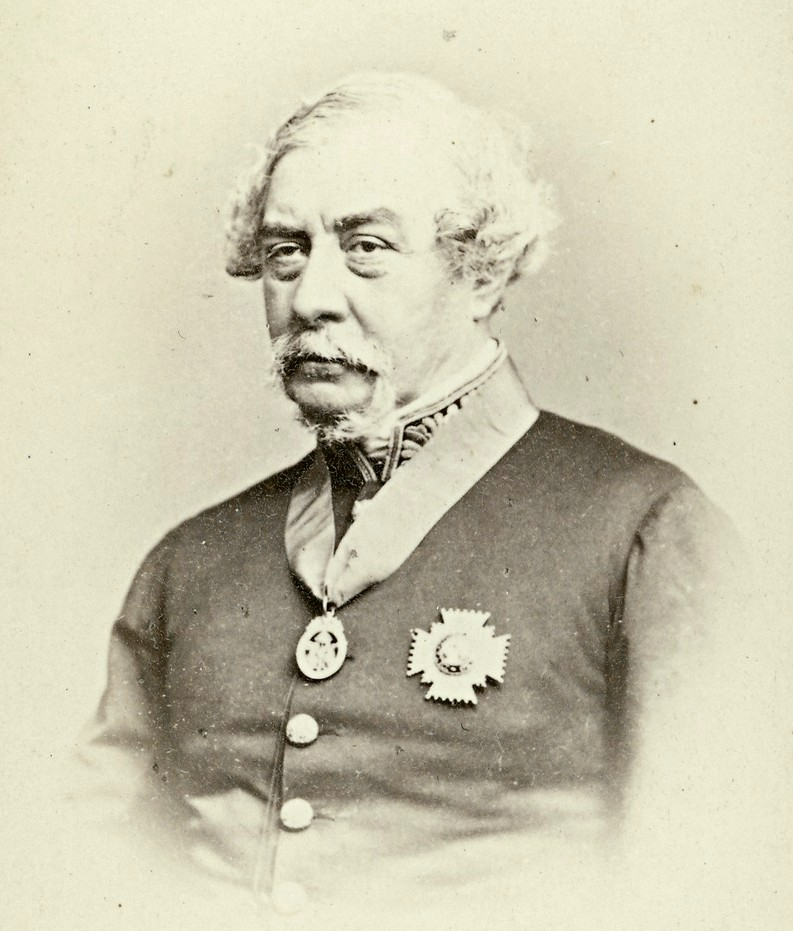

3rd Governor of Barbados and the Windward Islands
- In office 1841–1841
- Preceded by: Sir Evan Murray-Macgregor
- Succeeded by: Sir Charles Grey

10th Lieutenant-Governor of St. Lucia
- In office 1848–1852
- Preceded by: Sir Arthur Torrens
- Succeeded by: Henry Clermont Cobbe

Acting Governor of Cape Colony
- In office 1854–1854
- Preceded by: Sir George Cathcart
- Succeeded by: Sir George Grey

48th Governor of Newfoundland
- In office 1855–1857
- Preceded by: Ker Baillie-Hamilton
- Succeeded by: Sir Alexander Bannerman

Governor of Jamaica
- In office 1857–1863

3rd Governor of Victoria
- In office 1863–1866
- Preceded by: Henry Barkly
- Succeeded by: Sir John Manners-Sutton

Personal details
- Born: 19 February 1809 Annapolis Royal, Nova Scotia, Canada
- Died: 25 January 1870 (aged 60) Lansdown Crescent, Cheltenham, Gloucestershire, England

Viceregal styles of Sir Charles Darling
- Reference style: His Excellency
- Spoken style: Your Excellency

Sir Charles Henry Darling KCB (19 February 1809 – 25 January 1870) was a British colonial governor.

== Early life ==
Darling was born on 19 February 1809 in Annapolis Royal, Nova Scotia. He was the son of Isabella (née Cameron) and Henry Charles Darling. His father was a British Army officer who was attached to the colonial militia in Nova Scotia; he later attained the rank of major-general and served as lieutenant-governor of Tobago. His maternal grandfather Charles Cameron was a long-serving governor of the Bahamas.

Darling was educated in England at the Royal Military College, Sandhurst. In December 1826 he enlisted as an ensign in the 57th Regiment of Foot and was posted to the colony of New South Wales. He served for a period as assistant private secretary to his uncle, Governor Ralph Darling. He was promoted lieutenant in 1830 and the following year return to England to complete further training at Sandhurst. He was appointed military secretary to Lionel Smith, Governor of Barbados, in 1833 and followed Smith to Jamaica in 1836.

== Colonial governor ==
He started his colonial service while in Jamaica, during which time he often clashed with leaders of the free people of color who were elected to the island's Assembly, such as Robert Osborn. He became Lieutenant-Governor of St. Lucia in 1847, and he became Lieutenant-Governor of the Cape Colony in South Africa in 1851. A town in South Africa, on the West Coast of the country was named after Darling. He became Governor of Newfoundland in 1855. Darling became governor and captain-chief of Jamaica in 1856 then governor of Victoria, Australia from 1863 to 1866.

During his time in Newfoundland, Darling came into disagreement with prominent people in the colony regarding fishing rights. He supported the British recommendations to grant the French more fishing rights in waters of Newfoundland between Cape St. John and Cape Ray. Ultimately, the dispute ended his term in office.

In Victoria, Darling was embroiled in a constitutional crisis when he obeyed the advice of premier James McCulloch to authorise payments servicing a £40,000 loan made by London Chartered Bank of Australia, of which McCulloch was a director, without appropriation by the Legislative Council. The loan had been extended after McCulloch's government had lost supply when attempting to force the Legislative Council to approve a new tariff my attaching it to the annual appropriation bill.

Following his early recall as Governor of Victoria, the colonial parliament attempted to compensate Darling through a £20,000 payment to his wife. Henry Herbert, 4th Earl of Carnarvon, the colonial secretary, sent messages to both the Darlings and the Legislative Assembly that this would not be permitted. He also instructed the new governor, Sir John Manners-Sutton, to refuse assent to any such bill passed while Darling remained in the Colonial Service. Victoria was Darling's final posting.

== Personal life ==
In 1835, Darling married Anne Wilhelmina Dalzell, a member of a wealthy plantation-owning family from Barbados. They had a son who died in infancy and Anne herself died in 1837. Through Anne's will, Darling would have received some money, although she died before her mother who had owned the slaves.

He was then married, at Christ Church, Barbados, on 14 December 1839 to Mary Ann Nurse (who died of yellow fever in St Lucia on 6 November 1848). His third marriage, at Ilfracombe, North Devon, was on 10 December 1851 to Elizabeth Isabella Caroline Salter (c. 1820 – 10 December 1900).

Charles Henry Darling died at Lansdown Crescent, Cheltenham, Gloucestershire, aged 60.

== Legacy ==
Darling Street in the Ballarat south suburb of Redan is named for him.

== See also ==
- Governors of Newfoundland
- List of people of Newfoundland and Labrador
- Governor of Victoria

Government offices
Preceded by Sir Evan John Murray MacGregor	Governor of Barbados and the Windward Islands; 1841	Succeeded by Sir Charles Edward Grey
Preceded by Arthur Wellesley Torrens	Lieutenant-Governor of St. Lucia; 1848–1852	Succeeded by Henry Clermont Cobbe
Preceded by Sir George Cathcart	Governor of the Cape Colony, acting 1854	Succeeded by Sir George Grey
Preceded by Ker Baillie Hamilton	Governor of Newfoundland; 1855–1857	Succeeded by Sir Alexander Bannerman
Preceded by Edward Wells Bell	Governor of Jamaica; 1857–1863	Succeeded by Edward John Eyre
Preceded by Sir Henry Barkly	Governor of Victoria; 1863–1866	Succeeded by Sir John Manners-Sutton
