= Governor-General of the Province of Canada =

Colonial governor of Canada from 1841 to 1867

The Governor General of the Province of Canada was the viceregal post of the pre-Confederation Province of Canada that existed from 1841 to Canadian Confederation in 1867.

The post replaced the Governor General of New France and later Governor General of British North America, which had replaced that of Commander-in-Chief of British North America. With Confederation and the dissolution of the Province of Canada, a new post was created, that of Governor General of Canada.

During the duration seven individuals held this post, who were either colonial administrators of diplomats.

== List ==
Name	Image	Governor from	Governor until	Monarch
Lord Sydenham; PC (1799–1841)		1841	1841	Victoria
Sir Charles Bagot (1781–1843)		1842	1843	Victoria
Sir Charles Metcalfe (1785–1844)		1843	1845	Victoria
The Earl Cathcart (1783–1859)		1846	1847	Victoria
The Earl of Elgin and Kincardine (1811–1863)		1847	1854	Victoria
Sir Edmund Walker Head (1805–1868)		1854	1861	Victoria
The Viscount Monck (1819–1894)		1861	1867	Victoria

== Residences ==
- Alwington House, Kingston: 1841–1844
- Château Ramezay, Montreal: 1844–1849
- Elmsley House, Toronto: 1849–1852
- Elmsley House, Toronto: 1856–1858

== See also ==
- List of governors general of Canada, 1841–1867
