= List of lieutenant governors of Nova Scotia =

The following is a list of the governors and lieutenant governors of Nova Scotia. Though the present day office of the lieutenant governor in Nova Scotia came into being only upon the province's entry into Canadian Confederation in 1867, the post is a continuation from the first governorship of Nova Scotia in 1710. For much of the time, the full title of the post was Governor of Nova Scotia and Placentia (Placentia, Newfoundland). Before the British occupation of Nova Scotia, the province was governed by French Governors of Acadia. From 1784 to 1829 Cape Breton Island was a separate colony with a vice regal post.

== Governors of Nova Scotia, 1710–1786 ==
#	Image	Name	Governor from	Governor until
Governors under Anne (1710–1714):
1.		Samuel Vetch	1710	1712
2.		Francis Nicholson	1712	→
Governors under George I (1714–1727):
2.		Francis Nicholson (continued)	←	1715
3.		Samuel Vetch (second appointment)	1715	→
		Thomas Caulfeild (acting governor)	1715	1717
3.		Samuel Vetch (cont.)	←	1717
4.		Richard Philipps	1717	→
		John Doucett (acting governor)	1717	1725
		Lawrence Armstrong (acting governor)	1725	→
Governors under George II (1727–1760):
		Lawrence Armstrong (continued)	←	1739
		Alexander Cosby (acting governor)	1739	1740
		Paul Mascarene (acting governor)	1740	1749
4.		Richard Philipps (continued)	←	1749
5.		Edward Cornwallis	1749	1752
6.		Peregrine Hopson	1752	→
		Charles Lawrence (acting governor)	1753	1755
6.		Peregrine Hopson (continued)	←	1755
7.		Charles Lawrence (ordinary governor)	1756	1760
8.		Lt. Gov. Jonathan Belcher (For Gov. Henry Ellis)	1760	→
Governors under George III (1760–1786):
8.		Lt. Gov. Jonathan Belcher (continued) (For Gov. Henry Ellis)	←	1763
9.		Montague Wilmot	1763	1766
10.		Lord William Campbell	1766	→
		Benjamin Green (acting governor)	1766	
		Michael Francklin (acting governor)	1766	
10.		Lord William Campbell (continued)	←	→
		Michael Francklin (acting governor, second time)	1767	1768
10.		Lord William Campbell (continued)	←	→
		Benjamin Green (acting governor, second time)	1771	1772
		Michael Francklin (acting governor, third time)	1772	
10.		Lord William Campbell (continued)	→	1773
11.		Francis Legge	1773	1776
12.		Mariot Arbuthnot	1776	1778
13.		Sir Richard Hughes, 2nd Baronet	1778	1781
14.		Sir Andrew Snape Hamond	1781	1782
15.		John Parr	1782	1783
16.		Edmund Fanning	1783	1786

== Lieutenant governors of Cape Breton Island, 1784–1820 ==
#	Image	Name	Governor from	Governor until
Governors under George III (1784–1820):
1.		Joseph Frederick Wallet DesBarres	1784	1787
2.		William Macarmick	1787	1815
3.		David Mathews (acting)	1795	1798
4.		James Ogilvie (acting)	1798	1799
5.		John Murray (acting)	1799	1801
6.		John Despard (acting)	1800	1807
7.		Nicholas Nepean (acting)	1807	1812
8.		Hugh Swayne (acting)	1813	1816
9.		George Robert Ainslie	1815	1820

== Lieutenant governors of Nova Scotia, 1786–1867 ==
#	Image	Name	Governor from	Governor until
Governors under George III (1786–1820):
15.		John Parr	1786	1791
17.		Richard Bulkeley	1791	1792
18.		Sir John Wentworth	1792	1808
19.		Sir George Prevost, 1st Baronet	1808	→
		Alexander Croke (acting governor)	1811	
19.		Sir George Prevost, 1st Baronet (continued)	←	1811
20.		Sir John Coape Sherbrooke	1811	1816
21.		George Stracey Smyth	1816	
22.		George Ramsay, 9th Earl of Dalhousie	1816	→
Governors under George IV (1820–1830):
22.		Earl of Dalhousie (continued)	←	1820
23.		Sir James Kempt	1820	→
		Thomas Nickleson Jeffery (acting governor)	1828	
23.		Sir James Kempt(continued)	←	1828
24.		Sir Peregrine Maitland	1828	→
Governors under William IV (1830–1837):
24.		Sir Peregrine Maitland (continued)	←	→
		Thomas Nickleson Jeffery (acting governor, second time)	1834	
24.		Sir Peregrine Maitland (continued)	←	1834
25.		Sir Colin Campbell	1834	→
Governors under Queen Victoria (1837–1867):
25.		Sir Colin Campbell (continued)	←	1840
26.		Lucius Cary, 10th Viscount Falkland	1840	→
		Sir Jeremiah Dickson (acting governor)	1846	
26.		Viscount Falkland (continued)	←	1846
27.		Sir John Harvey	1846	→
		John Bazalgette (acting governor)	1851	
27.		Sir John Harvey (continued)	←	1852
28.		Sir John Gaspard Le Marchant	1852	1858
29.		George Phipps, Earl of Mulgrave	1858	1863
30.		Charles Hastings Doyle	1863	1864
31.		Sir Richard Graves MacDonnell	1864	1865
30.		Charles Hastings Doyle (second time)	1865	
32.		Sir William Williams, 1st Baronet, of Kars	1865	1867

== Lieutenant governors of Nova Scotia, 1867–present ==
#	Image	Name	Governor from	Governor until
Governors under Queen Victoria (1867–1901):
32.		Sir William Williams, 1st Baronet (continued)	1867	1867
30.		Charles Hastings Doyle (third time)	1867	1873
33.		Joseph Howe	1873	
34.		Sir Adams George Archibald	1873	1883
35.		Matthew Henry Richey	1883	1888
36.		Archibald McLelan	1888	1890
Admin.		Sir James McDonald	1890	
37.		Malachy Bowes Daly	1890	1900
38.		Alfred Gilpin Jones	1900	→
Governors under Edward VII (1901–1910):
38.		Alfred Gilpin Jones (continued)	←	1906
Admin.		Robert Linton Weatherbe	1906	
39.		Duncan Cameron Fraser	1906	→
Governors under George V (1910–1936):
39.		Duncan Cameron Fraser (continued)	←	1910
Admin.		Sir Charles James Townshend	1910	
40.		James Drummond McGregor	1910	1915
41.		David MacKeen	1915	1916
Admin.		Wallace Nesbit Graham	1916	
42.		MacCallum Grant	1916	1925
43.		James Robson Douglas	1925	
44.		James Cranswick Tory	1925	1930
45.		Frank Stanfield	1930	1931
Admin.		Sir Joseph Andrew Chisholm	1931	
46.		Walter Harold Covert	1931	→
Governors under Edward VIII (1936):
46.		Walter Harold Covert (continued)	←	→
Governors under George VI (1936–1952):
46.		Walter Harold Covert (continued)	←	1937
47.		Robert Irwin	1937	1940
48.		Frederick Francis Mathers	1940	1942
49.		Henry Ernest Kendall	1942	1947
50.		John Alexander Douglas McCurdy	1947	→
Governors under Elizabeth II (1952–2022):
50.		John Alexander Douglas McCurdy (continued)	←	1952
51.		Alistair Fraser	1952	1958
52.		Edward Chester Plow	1958	1963
53.		Henry Poole MacKeen	1963	1968
54.		Victor de Bedia Oland	1968	1973
55.		Clarence Gosse	1973	1978
56.		John Elvin Shaffner	1978	1984
57		Alan Abraham	1984	1989
58.		Lloyd Crouse	1989	1994
59.		James Kinley	1994	2000
60.		Myra Freeman	2000	2006
61.		Mayann Francis	2006	2012
62.		John James Grant	2012	2017
63.		Arthur Joseph LeBlanc	2017	→
Governors under Charles III (2022–present):
63.		Arthur Joseph LeBlanc (continued)	←	2024
64.		Michael Savage	2024	Incumbent

== See also ==
- Office-holders of Canada
- Canadian incumbents by year
