= 1940 in Canada =

- Decades: 1920s; 1930s; 1940s; 1950s; 1960s
- See also: History of Canada; Timeline of Canadian history; List of years in Canada

Events from the year 1940 in Canada.

== Incumbents ==
=== Crown ===
- Monarch – George VI

=== Federal government ===
- Governor General – John Buchan, Lord Tweedsmuir (until February 11) then Alexander Cambridge, 1st Earl of Athlone (from June 21)
- Prime Minister – William Lyon Mackenzie King
- Chief Justice – Lyman Poore Duff (British Columbia)
- Parliament – 18th (until 25 January) then 19th (from 16 May)

=== Provincial governments ===
==== Lieutenant governors ====
- Lieutenant Governor of Alberta – John C. Bowen
- Lieutenant Governor of British Columbia – Eric Hamber
- Lieutenant Governor of Manitoba – William Johnston Tupper(until November 1) then Roland Fairbairn McWilliams
- Lieutenant Governor of New Brunswick – Murray MacLaren (until March 5) then William George Clark
- Lieutenant Governor of Nova Scotia – Robert Irwin (until May 31) then Frederick Francis Mathers
- Lieutenant Governor of Ontario – Albert Edward Matthews
- Lieutenant Governor of Prince Edward Island – Bradford William LePage
- Lieutenant Governor of Quebec – Eugène Fiset
- Lieutenant Governor of Saskatchewan – Archibald Peter McNab

==== Premiers ====
- Premier of Alberta – William Aberhart
- Premier of British Columbia – Thomas Dufferin Pattullo
- Premier of Manitoba – John Bracken
- Premier of New Brunswick – Allison Dysart (until March 13) then John McNair
- Premier of Nova Scotia – Angus Lewis Macdonald (until July 10) then A.S. MacMillan
- Premier of Ontario – Mitchell Hepburn
- Premier of Prince Edward Island – Thane Campbell
- Premier of Quebec – Adélard Godbout
- Premier of Saskatchewan – William John Patterson

=== Territorial governments ===
==== Commissioners ====
- Controller of Yukon – George A. Jeckell
- Commissioner of Northwest Territories – Charles Camsell

== Events ==
=== January to June ===
- March 13 – John B. McNair becomes premier of New Brunswick, replacing Allison Dysart
- March 21 – Alberta election: William Aberhart's Social Credit Party wins a second consecutive majority
- March 26 – Federal election: Mackenzie King's Liberals win a second consecutive majority
- April 3 – Alexander Cambridge, 1st Earl of Athlone, is appointed Governor General of Canada replacing the late John Buchan, 1st Baron Tweedsmuir
- April 25 – Quebec women get the vote in provincial elections
- May 28–June 30 – World War II: The Royal Canadian Navy stations seven destroyers in the English Channel; these play an important role in evacuating Allied troops from France
- June – World War II: Canadian troops are some of a small number of forces defending Britain
- June 5 – Nazi, fascist, and communist groups are declared illegal in Canada and leaders and members are jailed
- June 10 – World War II: Canada declares war against Italy
- June 13–18 – World War II: A small number of Canadian troops land in Brest, France, but are forced to evacuate soon after
- June 21 – The National Resources Mobilization Act is passed; conscription is introduced, but only for homeland defence
- June 25 – HMCS Fraser sinks in a collision in the Gironde estuary in France. 45 sailors die.

=== July to December ===
- July 10: Alexander MacMillan becomes premier of Nova Scotia, replacing Angus Macdonald
- August 1 – September 17: World War II: 80 Canadian pilots participate in the Battle of Britain
- August 5: Camillien Houde, the mayor of Montreal, is arrested for sedition due to his anti-conscription rhetoric
- August 7: Unemployment insurance is introduced
- August 13: The Canadian Armoured Corps is established
- August 18: The Odgensburg Agreement on continental defence is signed with the United States
- September 5: United Kingdom trades most of its North American military bases to the United States in exchange for 50 destroyers
- October 22: HMCS Margaree is sunk in a collision in the North Atlantic. 142 sailors die and 34 survive.
- November 7: The Permanent Active Militia is renamed the Canadian Army (Active) and the Non-Permanent Active Militia is renamed the Canadian Army (Reserve).

=== Full date unknown ===
- The Icefields Parkway in the Canadian Rockies is completed.
- The Rowell-Sirois Commission report on federal-provincial relations is released
- Wilbur Franks invents the g-suit at the University of Toronto

== Arts and literature ==
=== New works ===
- Morley Callaghan – Just Ask George

=== Awards ===
- See the 1940 Governor General's Awards for a complete list of winners and finalists for those awards.

== Sport ==
- April 13 – The New York Rangers win their third Stanley Cup (and last until 1994) by defeating the Toronto Maple Leafs 4 games to 2. The deciding Game 6 was played at the Maple Leaf Gardens in Toronto
- April 22 – The Ontario Hockey Association's Oshawa Generals win their second (consecutive) Memorial Cup by defeating Manitoba Junior Hockey League's Kenora Thistles 3 games to 1. The deciding Game 4 was played at Shea's Amphitheatre in Winnipeg
- November 30 – The Ottawa Rough Riders win their second Grey Cup by defeating the Toronto Balmy Beach Beachers 20 to 7 in the 28th Grey Cup played at Varsity Stadium in Toronto

== Births ==
=== January to March ===
- January 1 - Clifford Olson, serial killer (d. 2011)
- January 10 - Guy Chevrette, politician
- January 19 - Linda Sorenson, actress
- January 28 - Valery Fabrikant, professor of mechanical engineering and murderer responsible for the Concordia University massacre on August 24, 1992
- February 4 - Michelle Rossignol, Canadian actress
- February 16 - Don Bertoia, middle-distance runner
- March 4 - Nellie Cournoyea, former politician and 6th Premier of the Northwest Territories and the first female premier of a Canadian territory
- March 6 - Ken Danby, artist (d. 2007)
- March 22 - Dave Keon, ice hockey player

=== April to June ===
- May 4 - Paul Thompson, playwright and theatre director
- May 8 - Irwin Cotler, politician and minister
- May 10 - Peter Liba, journalist and Lieutenant-Governor of Manitoba (d. 2007)
- May 20 - Otto Jelinek, figure skater, businessman and politician
- June 14 - Mark Assad, politician
- June 21 - Helen Potrebenko, author and activist (d. 2022)
- June 25 - Louise Dacquay, politician

=== July to September ===
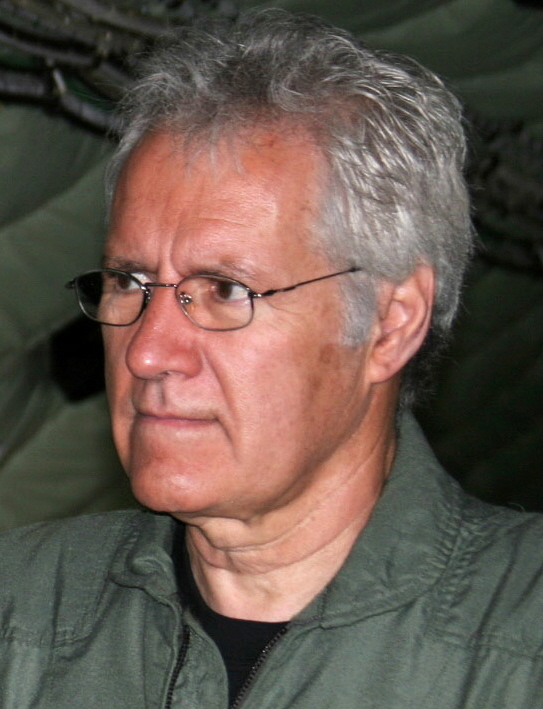
Alex Trebek, March 2007

- July 4 - Pat Stapleton, ice hockey player (d. 2020)
- July 11 - Yvon Charbonneau, politician (d. 2016)
- July 15 - Glen Findlay, politician
- July 22 - Alex Trebek, television personality and game show host (d. 2020 in the United States)
- July 26 - Bobby Rousseau, ice hockey player (d. 2025)
- July 27 - Harvie Andre, engineer, businessman, politician and Minister
- July 28 - Mario Sergio, politician
- August 7 - Sally McCallum, track and field athlete
- September 1 - Edward Roberts, lawyer and politician (d. 2022)
- September 6 - Brian Smith, ice hockey player and sportscaster (d. 1995)
- September 9 - Larry Lund, ice hockey player
- September 11 - Gerry Phillips, politician
- September 19
  - Sylvia Tyson, singer-songwriter and guitarist
  - Ed Westfall, ice hockey player and sportscaster
- September 20 - Doug Young, politician and cabinet minister
- September 29 - Al Mair, founder of Attic Records
- September 30
  - Harry Jerome, track and field runner (d. 1982)
  - Dewey Martin, rock drummer (d. 2009)

=== October to December ===
- October 6 – Ginette Ravel, singer and lyricist (d. 2022)
- October 11 - David McFadden, poet, fiction writer and travel writer
- October 19 - Bill Gairdner, track and field athlete
- October 29 - Galen Weston, businessman
- November 13 - Daniel Pilon, Canadian actor
- November 20 - George Swede, poet and children's writer
- November 29 - Denny Doherty, singer and songwriter (d. 2007)
- December 20 - Ed Helwer, politician
- December 29 - George Puce, discus thrower

=== Full date unknown ===
- Christine Demeter, murder victim (d. 1973)
- Stan Hagen, politician (d. 2009)
- Dave Nichol, Loblaws products marketer (d. 2013)

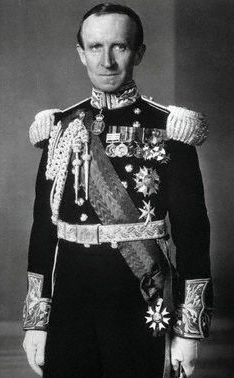
John Buchan, 1st Baron Tweedsmuir

== Deaths ==
=== January to June ===
- February 11 - John Buchan, 1st Baron Tweedsmuir, novelist, politician and 15th Governor General of Canada (b. 1875)
- March 3 - Joseph Ovide Brouillard, politician and businessman (b. 1859)
- March 26 - Richard Squires, politician and Prime Minister of Newfoundland (b. 1880)
- April 25 - John Hampden Burnham, politician and lawyer (b. 1860)
- May 2 - James Bowman, politician (b. 1861)
- June 10 - Norman McLeod Rogers, lawyer, politician and Minister (b. 1894)

=== July to December ===
- September 2 - Maude Abbott, physician (b. 1869)
- September 7 - Laura Borden, wife of Robert Borden, 8th Prime Minister of Canada (b. 1862)
- October 9 - Wilfred Grenfell, medical missionary (b. 1865)
- October 10 - Berton Churchill, actor (b. 1876)
- December 5 - Wilfred Lucas, actor, film director and screenwriter (b. 1871)
