= 1941 in Canada =

- Decades: 1920s; 1930s; 1940s; 1950s; 1960s
- See also: History of Canada; Timeline of Canadian history; List of years in Canada

Events from the year 1941 in Canada.

== Incumbents ==
=== Crown ===
- Monarch – George VI

=== Federal government ===
- Governor General – Alexander Cambridge, 1st Earl of Athlone
- Prime Minister – William Lyon Mackenzie King
- Chief Justice – Lyman Poore Duff (British Columbia)
- Parliament – 19th

=== Provincial governments ===
==== Lieutenant governors ====
- Lieutenant Governor of Alberta – John C. Bowen
- Lieutenant Governor of British Columbia – Eric Hamber (until August 29) then William Culham Woodward
- Lieutenant Governor of Manitoba – Roland Fairbairn McWilliams
- Lieutenant Governor of New Brunswick – William George Clark
- Lieutenant Governor of Nova Scotia – Frederick Francis Mathers
- Lieutenant Governor of Ontario – Albert Edward Matthews
- Lieutenant Governor of Prince Edward Island – Bradford William LePage
- Lieutenant Governor of Quebec – Eugène Fiset
- Lieutenant Governor of Saskatchewan – Archibald Peter McNab

==== Premiers ====
- Premier of Alberta – William Aberhart
- Premier of British Columbia – Duff Pattullo (until December 9) then John Hart
- Premier of Manitoba – John Bracken
- Premier of New Brunswick – John McNair
- Premier of Nova Scotia – A.S. MacMillan
- Premier of Ontario – Mitchell Hepburn
- Premier of Prince Edward Island – Thane Campbell
- Premier of Quebec – Adélard Godbout
- Premier of Saskatchewan – William John Patterson

=== Territorial governments ===
==== Commissioners ====
- Controller of Yukon – George A. Jeckell
- Commissioner of Northwest Territories – Charles Camsell

== Events ==
- January 1 – The CBC News Service officially begins operations in English; operations in French begin the following day. CBC's board of governors determined that a national news service would assist in reporting the war.
- March 4 –The Royal Canadian Mounted Police begin to register Japanese Canadians; registration is completed by the end of August.
- April 29 – Quebec, the last province to exclude women from the legal profession, allow women to practise law. The first Quebec woman lawyer is Elizabeth Monk, who is called to the bar the next year.
- July 24 – Workers began an illegal strike at the Alcan aluminum complex at Arvida, Quebec, when 700 workers walk off the job. Some 4,500 workers occupy the factory the next day. Minister of Munitions and Supply C.D. Howe says that enemy sabotage was responsible for the work stoppage, and soldiers are sent to secure the facility. Work resumes on July 29 as workers and management negotiate, assisted by federal conciliators. A subsequent royal commission rejects the sabotage theory and finds that the strike was the result of worker dissatisfaction with wages and working conditions, as well as a heat wave that occurred immediately before the strike.
- August 9–12 – The Atlantic Conference meeting between Winston Churchill, Franklin D. Roosevelt and Harry Hopkins, as well as their civilian and military advisers, is held secretly aboard the USS Augusta docked in Ship Harbour, Placentia Bay, Argentia in the Dominion of Newfoundland. The leaders discuss Lend-Lease and the war in Europe. The conference was the first of nine wartime meetings between FDR and Churchill. On August 14, the leaders publicly issue the Atlantic Charter, a joint declaration of Anglo-American aims, including freedom of the seas, self-determination, free government, and liberal trade.
- August 12 – All Japanese Canadians are ordered to carry identity cards with their thumbprint and photo.
- August 13 – An order-in-council (PC 6289) establishes the Canadian Women's Army Corps. The Women's Royal Canadian Naval Service is established the following year.
- September 19 – German submarine U-74 torpedoes and sinks HMCS Lévis, killing 18 sailors.
- December 7 – HMCS Windflower collides with a merchant ship and sinks in the North Atlantic, killing 23 sailors.
- December 7(North America time)/December 8 (Hong Kong time) – Battle of Hong Kong: On the same morning as the attack on the U.S. naval base at Pearl Harbor, the Japanese attack British Hong Kong, with relentless air raids for the next 17 1/2 days. Hong Kong surrenders on December 25. Some 1,975 Canadian soldiers are posted in the colony, mostly infantry with the Royal Rifles of Canada and Winnipeg Grenadiers, who had arrived to reinforce the colony on October 27 aboard the Awatea, escorted by HMCS Prince Robert. The Japanese attack is a disaster for the Canadians, who were greatly outnumbered by the Japanese. Of the 1,975 Canadians who went to Hong Kong, more than 1,050 were killed or wounded, and many are taken prisoner by Japan.
- December 8 – Immediately following the Japanese attack on Hong Kong, Canada declares war on Japan, on the same day that Britain and the United States do so.
- December 8 – The day after Japanese attacks on Hong King and Pearl Harbor, all fishing boats owned by Japanese Canadians are impounded by the Royal Canadian Navy.
- December 9 – John Hart becomes Premier of British Columbia, replacing Thomas "Duff" Pattullo, after a Liberal convention dumps Pattullo as leader and replaces him with Hart. Following the October 21 provincial election in which the Liberals fell to 21 seats while the CCF won 14 and the Conservatives 12, Pattullo's government had faltered. Hart forms a coalition between the Liberals and the Conservatives.

=== Undated ===
- The Victoria Park Plant (later renamed the R. C. Harris Water Treatment Plant), a massive Art Deco water facility, opens in Toronto.

== Sports ==
- April 30 – The Manitoba Junior Hockey League's Winnipeg Rangers win their first Memorial Cup by defeating the Quebec Junior Hockey League's Montreal Royals 3 games to 2. The deciding game was played at the Montreal Forum.
- November 29 – The Winnipeg Blue Bombers win their third Grey Cup by defeating the Ottawa Rough Riders 18 to 16 in the 29th Grey Cup played at Varsity Stadium in Toronto.

== Births ==
=== January to June ===
- January 9 - Gilles Vaillancourt, politician
- January 12 - Long John Baldry, singer and voice actor (d. 2005)
- January 19 - Pat Patterson, pro wrestler (d. 2020)
- January 20 - Pierre Lalonde, singer and television host (d. 2016)
- January 21 - Gary Beck, two-time World champion drag racing driver
- January 26 - Doug Rogers, judoka and Olympic silver medallist

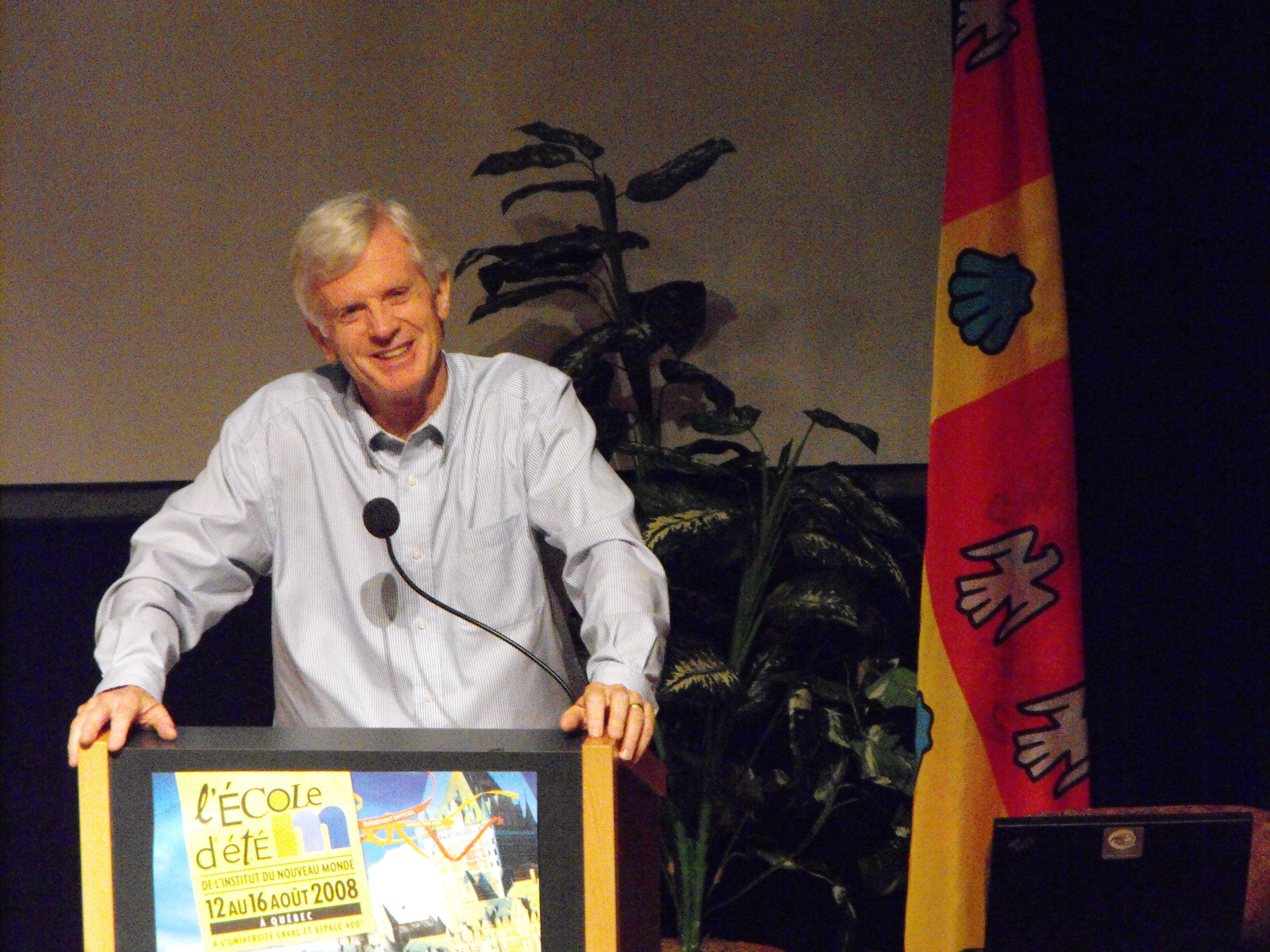
David Kilgour, 2008

- February 18 - David Kilgour, politician
- March 7 - Roger Young, politician and lawyer
- May 16 - Eric Berntson, politician (d. 2018)
- May 17 - Andy Boychuk, long-distance runner
- May 29 - Gilbert Barrette, politician
- June 17 - Roberta Maxwell, actress
- June 21 - Lyman Ward, actor

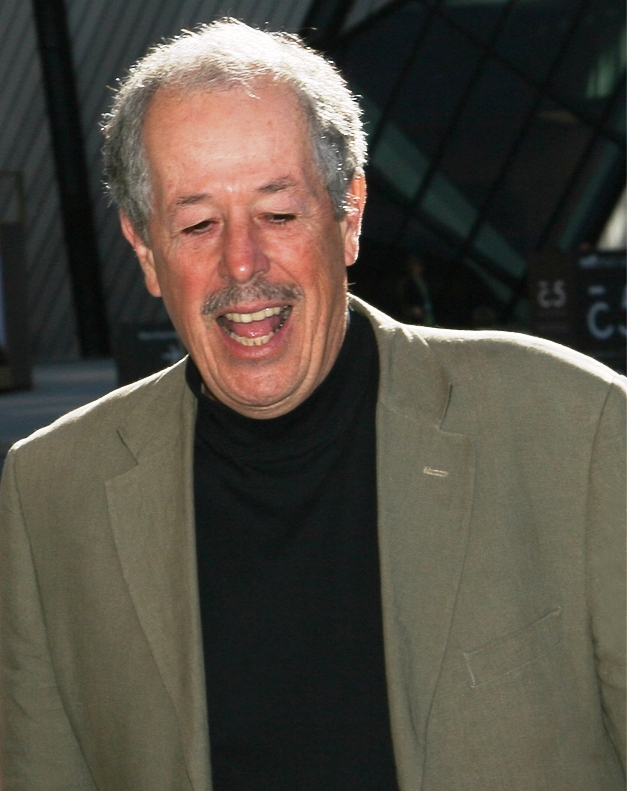
Denys Arcand at the 2007 Toronto International Film Festival

- June 25 - Denys Arcand, film director, screenwriter and producer

=== July to December ===
- July 1
  - Rod Gilbert, professional ice hockey forward (d. 2021)
  - Myron Scholes, economist
- July 7 - Vivian Barbot, Haitian-born Canadian teacher, activist, and politician
- July 14 - Dennis Kassian, ice hockey player
- July 22 - Ron Turcotte, jockey (d. 2025)
- July 28 - Peter Cullen, voice actor
- July 30 - Paul Anka, singer, songwriter and actor
- August 5 - Lenny Breau, guitarist (d. 1984)
- August 6 - Hedy Fry, politician and physician
- August 12 - Réjean Ducharme, novelist and playwright
- September 1 - Gwendolyn MacEwen, novelist and poet (d. 1987)
- September 5 - Dave Dryden, ice hockey player (d. 2022)
- October 5 - Bonnie Korzeniowski, politician
- October 13 - Robert Hunter, environmentalist, journalist, author and politician (d.2005)
- November 9 - Tom Siddon, politician
- December 22 - James Laxer, political economist, professor and author

=== Date unknown ===
- Gilles Blais, documentary filmmaker

== Deaths ==
=== January to June ===
- February 20 - La Bolduc, singer and musician (b.1894)
- February 21 - Frederick Banting, medical scientist, doctor and Nobel laureate (b.1891)
- April 22 - Ernest Lloyd Janney, Provisional Commander of the Canadian Aviation Corps (b.1893)
- June 10 - Henry Wise Wood, politician and president of the United Farmers of Alberta (b.1860)
- June 11 - Alexander Cameron Rutherford, lawyer and politician, first premier of Alberta (b.1857)
- June 16 - Edward Rogers Wood, financier (b.1866)

=== July to December ===
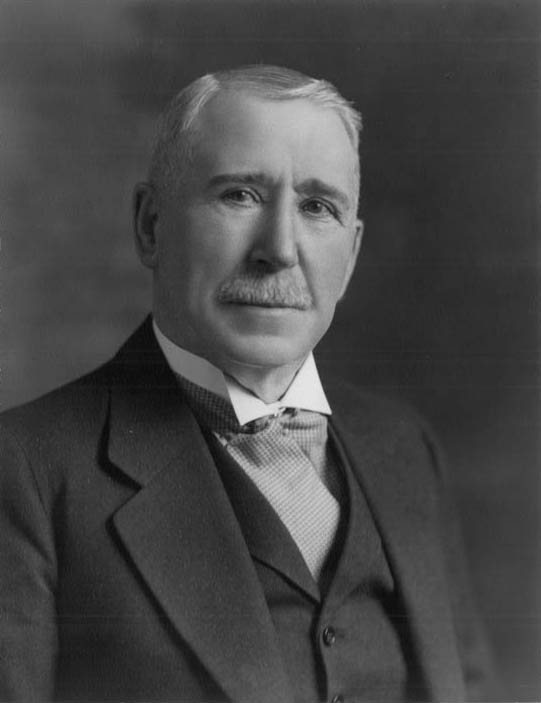
William Howard Hearst

- August 12 - Freeman Freeman-Thomas, 1st Marquess of Willingdon, 13th Governor General of Canada (b.1866)
- August 24 – Margaret McKellar, Scottish-born Canadian medical missionary (b.1861)
- September 29 - Sir William Hearst, politician and 7th Premier of Ontario (b.1864)
- October 17 - John Stanley Plaskett, astronomer (b.1865)
- November 18 - Émile Nelligan, poet (b.1879)
- November 22 - Newton Rowell, lawyer and politician (b.1867)
- November 26 - Ernest Lapointe, politician (b.1876)
- December 20 - John Campbell Elliott, lawyer and politician (b.1872)

=== Full date unknown ===
- William Robson, politician (b.1864)

== See also ==
- List of Canadian films
