= 1942 in Canada =

- Decades: 1920s; 1930s; 1940s; 1950s; 1960s
- See also: History of Canada; Timeline of Canadian history; List of years in Canada

Events from the year 1942 in Canada.

== Incumbents ==
=== Crown ===
- Monarch – George VI

=== Federal government ===
- Governor General – Alexander Cambridge, 1st Earl of Athlone
- Prime Minister – William Lyon Mackenzie King
- Chief Justice – Lyman Poore Duff (British Columbia)
- Parliament – 19th

=== Provincial governments ===
==== Lieutenant governors ====
- Lieutenant Governor of Alberta – John C. Bowen
- Lieutenant Governor of British Columbia – William Culham Woodward
- Lieutenant Governor of Manitoba – Roland Fairbairn McWilliams
- Lieutenant Governor of New Brunswick – William George Clark
- Lieutenant Governor of Nova Scotia – Frederick F. Mathers (until November 17) then Henry Ernest Kendall
- Lieutenant Governor of Ontario – Albert Edward Matthews
- Lieutenant Governor of Prince Edward Island – Bradford William LePage
- Lieutenant Governor of Quebec – Eugène Fiset
- Lieutenant Governor of Saskatchewan – Archibald Peter McNab

==== Premiers ====
- Premier of Alberta – William Aberhart
- Premier of British Columbia – John Hart
- Premier of Manitoba – John Bracken
- Premier of New Brunswick – John McNair
- Premier of Nova Scotia – A.S. MacMillan
- Premier of Ontario – Mitchell Hepburn (until October 21) then Gordon Daniel Conant
- Premier of Prince Edward Island – Thane Campbell
- Premier of Quebec – Adélard Godbout
- Premier of Saskatchewan – William John Patterson

=== Territorial governments ===
==== Commissioners ====
- Controller of Yukon – George A. Jeckell
- Commissioner of Northwest Territories – Charles Camsell

== Events ==
- January 10 – Elizabeth Monk and Suzanne Filion become the first female lawyers in Quebec
- February 10 – The German submarine U-136 torpedoes and sinks HMCS Spikenard, which had eight survivors.
- February 26 – Japanese Canadians are interned and moved further inland.
- April 27 – A national plebiscite is held on the issue of conscription. Most English-Canadians are in favour, while most French-Canadians are not.
- June 20 – The Japanese submarine I-26 shells the Estevan Point Lighthouse on Vancouver Island.
- July – The Official Food Rules is published, for the first time.
- August – The National Resources Mobilization Act is repealed as a result of the April plebiscite.
- August 6 – HMCS Assiniboine sinks the German submarine U-120. Max Bernays will be awarded the Conspicuous Gallantry Medal for his actions in the battle.
- August 19 – Dieppe Raid
- September 7 – The German submarine U-165 sinks HMCS Raccoon near Anticosti Island. All sailors aboard Racoon are killed.
- September 9 – The Canadian government establishes the Wartime Information Board, a government agency responsible for pro-conscription propaganda.
- September 11 – The German submarine U-517 sinks HMCS Charlottetown near Cap-Chat, Quebec, killing 9 out of the crew of 64.
- September 14 – The German submarine U-91 sinks HMCS Ottawa in the North Atlantic, killing 114 sailors, with 69 surviving.
- October 14 – The German submarine U-69 sinks the ferry SS Caribou in the Gulf of St. Lawrence, killing 137. Margaret Brooke will be named a Member of the Order of the British Empire for her actions during the sinking.
- October 21 – Gordon Conant becomes premier of Ontario, replacing Mitchell Hepburn
- December 12 – The Knights of Columbus Hostel fire in St John's, Newfoundland, kills 99.

== Sport ==
- April 18 – The Toronto Maple Leafs win their fourth Stanley Cup by defeating the Detroit Red Wings 4 games to 3 after being down to the Red Wings 3–0. The deciding Game 7 was played at Maple Leaf Gardens in Toronto
- April 20 – The Manitoba Junior Hockey League's Portage la Prairie Terriers win their only Memorial Cup by defeating the Ontario Hockey Association's Oshawa Generals 3 games to 1. The deciding Game 4 was played at Shea's Amphitheatre in Winnipeg
- December 5 – The Toronto RCAF Hurricanes win their only Grey Cup by defeating the Winnipeg RCAF Bombers 8 to 5 in the 30th Grey Cup played at Varsity Stadium in Toronto

== Births ==
=== January to March ===
- January 12 - Hilary Weston, businessperson and 26th Lieutenant Governor of Ontario
- January 16 - René Angélil, husband and manager of Céline Dion
- January 19 - John Reynolds, politician
- February 5 - Tim Sale, politician
- February 19 - Norm Sterling, politician
- February 20 - Phil Esposito, ice hockey player
- February 22 - Gerard Jennissen, politician
- March 3 - Menaka Thakka, dancer

=== April to June ===
- April 8 - Harold Gilleshammer, politician
- April 10 - Nick Auf der Maur, journalist and politician (died 1998)
- April 21 - Pierre Lorrain, Canadian lawyer and politician (died 2004)
- April 22 - Sandra Birdsell, novelist and short story writer
- April 26 - Sharon Carstairs, politician and Senator
- May 1 - Becky Barrett, politician
- May 3 - Earl McRae, journalist (Ottawa Sun) (died 2011)
- May 8 - Pierre Morency, Canadian poet and playwright
- May 29 - Larry Mavety, ice hockey player and coach (died 2020)
- June 9 - John Gerretsen, politician
- June 10 - Preston Manning, politician
- June 15 - Ian Greenberg, media businessman (died 2022)
- June 21 - Jeannette Corbiere Lavell, Native rights advocate
- June 25 - Michel Tremblay, novelist and playwright

=== July to September ===
- July 1 - Geneviève Bujold, actress
- July 4 - Len Harapiak, politician
- July 11 - Terry Carisse, singer, guitarist, and songwriter (died 2005)
- July 11 - Nancy Zerg, poet
- July 22 - Anita Neville, politician
- July 24 - Gloria George, Native leader
- August 1 - Michael Martchenko, illustrator
- August 10 - Jim Downey, politician
- August 18 - Jim Abbott, politician
- August 24 - Gary Filmon, politician and 19th Premier of Manitoba
- August 24 - Tony Hunt, artist
- August 25 - Ivan Koloff, pro wrestler
- August 30 - Rick Salutin, novelist, playwright and critic
- September 4 - George Baker, politician and Senator
- September 13 - Michael Breaugh, politician (died 2019)
- September 13 - Michel Côté, businessman and politician
- September 20 - Gérald Tremblay, businessman and politician, 41st Mayor of Montreal

=== October to December ===
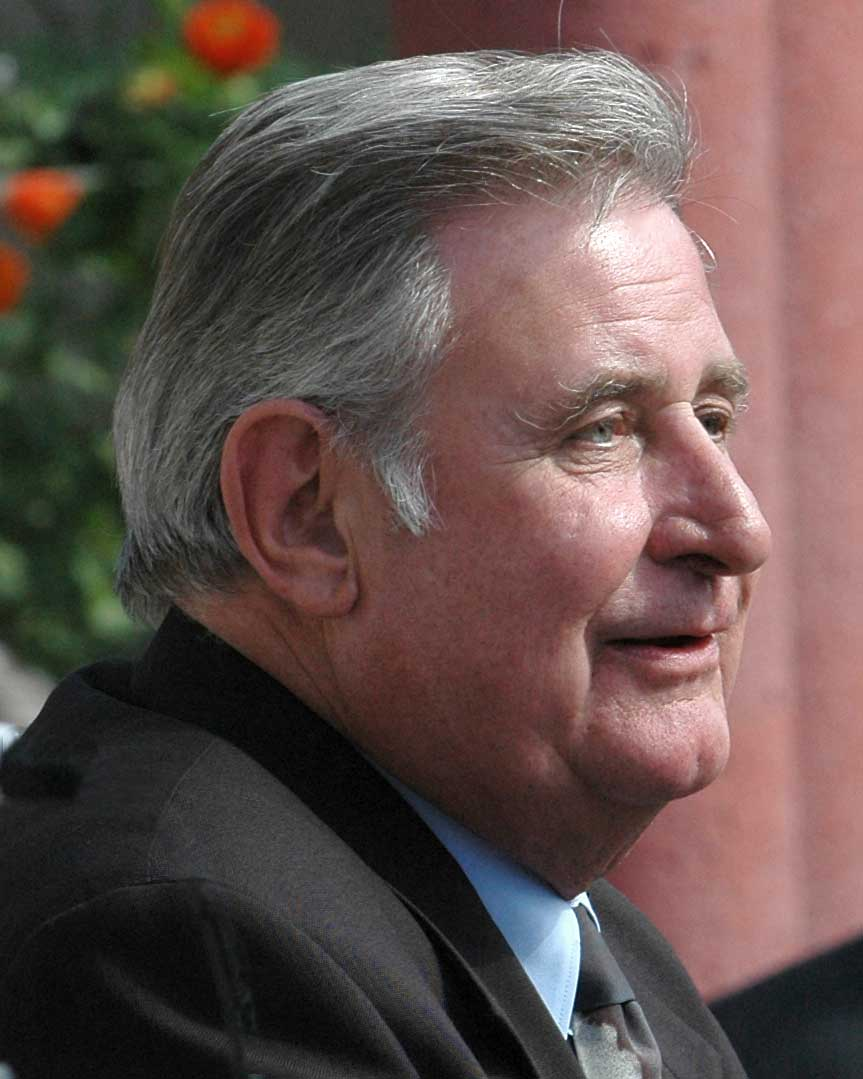
Ralph Klein

- October 10 - Roy Miki, poet and scholar (died 2024)
- October 11 - Dianne Brushett, politician
- November 1
  - Evelyn Gigantes, politician (died 2026)
  - Ralph Klein, politician and 12th Premier of Alberta (died 2013)
- November 8 - Lise Watier, businesswoman
- November 19 - Jim Ernst, politician
- November 20 - Raymond Bonin, politician
- December 1 - Charlie Penson, politician
- December 19 - John Godfrey, educator, journalist and politician
- December 21 - Oliver Bowen, engineer
- December 30 - Matt Cohen, writer (died 1999)

=== Full date unknown ===
- Yves Lever, film critic and historian
- Dermot O'Reilly, musician, producer and songwriter (died 2007)
- Jay Roberts, football player, lung cancer (died 2010)

== Deaths ==
- January 16 - Prince Arthur, Duke of Connaught and Strathearn, 10th Governor General of Canada (born 1850)
- January 30 - Frederick W. A. G. Haultain, politician and 1st Premier of the Northwest Territories (born 1857)
- February 4 - Louis-Adolphe Paquet, theologian (born 1859)
- March 11 - Raoul Dandurand, politician (born 1861)
- March 15 - Edgar Nelson Rhodes, politician, Minister and Premier of Nova Scotia (born 1877)
- March 21 - J. S. Woodsworth, politician (born 1874)
- April 24 - Lucy Maud Montgomery, author (born 1874)
- May 18 - Herménégilde Boulay, politician (born 1861)
- June 17 - Charles Fitzpatrick, lawyer, politician and 5th Chief Justice of Canada (born 1853)
- October 6 - Ella Cora Hind, journalist and women's rights activist (born 1861)
- December 26 - Frank Dawson Adams, geologist (born 1859)

== See also ==
- List of Canadian films
