= 1945 in Canada =

- Decades: 1920s; 1930s; 1940s; 1950s; 1960s
- See also: History of Canada; Timeline of Canadian history; List of years in Canada

Events from the year 1945 in Canada.

== Incumbents ==
=== Crown ===
- Monarch – George VI

=== Federal government ===
- Governor General – Alexander Cambridge, 1st Earl of Athlone
- Prime Minister – William Lyon Mackenzie King
- Chief Justice – Thibaudeau Rinfret (Quebec)
- Parliament – 19th (until 16 April) then 20th (from 6 September)

=== Provincial governments ===
==== Lieutenant governors ====
- Lieutenant Governor of Alberta – John C. Bowen
- Lieutenant Governor of British Columbia – William Culham Woodward
- Lieutenant Governor of Manitoba – Roland Fairbairn McWilliams
- Lieutenant Governor of New Brunswick – William George Clark (until November 1) then David Laurence MacLaren
- Lieutenant Governor of Nova Scotia – Henry Ernest Kendall
- Lieutenant Governor of Ontario – Albert Edward Matthews
- Lieutenant Governor of Prince Edward Island – Bradford William LePage (until May 18) then Joseph Alphonsus Bernard
- Lieutenant Governor of Quebec – Eugène Fiset
- Lieutenant Governor of Saskatchewan – Archibald P. McNab (until February 27) then Thomas Miller (February 27 to June 20) then Reginald John Marsden Parker (from June 22)

==== Premiers ====
- Premier of Alberta – Ernest Manning
- Premier of British Columbia – John Hart
- Premier of Manitoba – Stuart Garson
- Premier of New Brunswick – John McNair
- Premier of Nova Scotia – A.S. MacMillan (until September 8) then Angus Macdonald
- Premier of Ontario – George A. Drew
- Premier of Prince Edward Island – J. Walter Jones
- Premier of Quebec – Maurice Duplessis
- Premier of Saskatchewan – Tommy Douglas

=== Territorial governments ===
==== Commissioners ====
- Controller of Yukon – George A. Jeckell
- Commissioner of Northwest Territories – Charles Camsell

== Events ==
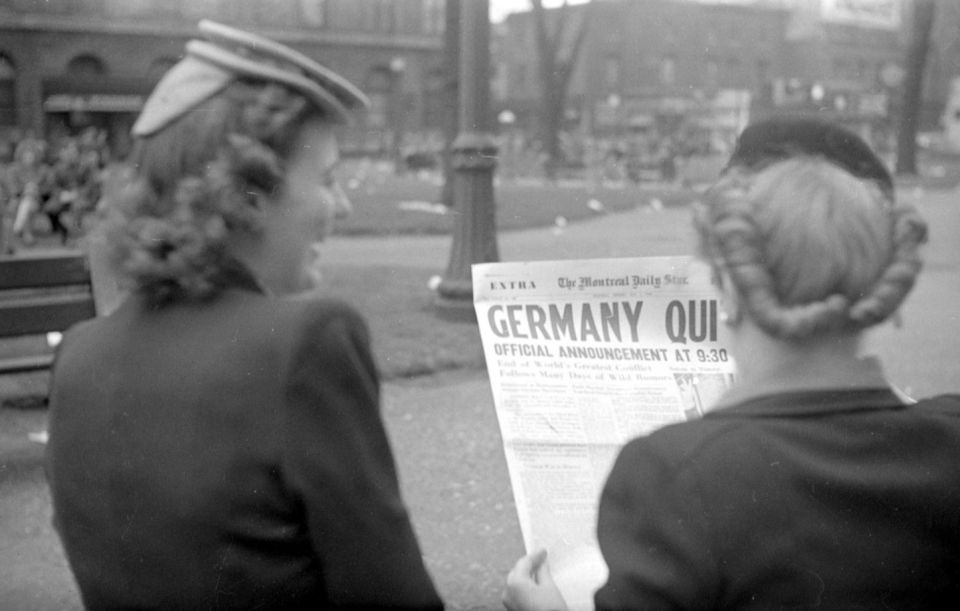
Two young women standing on Saint Catherine Street in Montreal, reading the front page of The Montreal Daily Star. The title "Germany Quit" announces the German surrender and the impending end of the World War II in Europe.

- 1944–1945: World War II: Japan's Special Balloon Regiment launched 9,000 Fu-Go balloon bombs towards the Pacific Northwest, intended to cause panic, by starting forest fires. Six casualties, a woman and her five children in American state of Oregon, were reported. The ten metre-wide balloons contained 540 cubic metres of hydrogen and reached as far inland as Manitoba. The Japanese project was declared a failure and abandoned, after six months.
- January 8 – Brantford, Ontario becomes the first Canadian community to fluoridate its water supply.
- January 20 – World War II: The first conscripted Canadian soldiers arrive overseas
- February 8 – World War II: The Anglo-Canadian Operation Veritable launched in the Netherlands
- February 24 – Radio Canada International begins operation
- February 25 – Sergeant Aubrey Cosens posthumously awarded the Victoria Cross
- March 1 – Major Frederick Albert Tilston wins the Victoria Cross
- March 29 – The British Commonwealth Air Training Plan is shut down
- April 16 – World War II: HMCS Esquimalt is sunk off Halifax by the German submarine U-190.
- May 7 – The crew of HMCS Uganda vote themselves out of the Pacific war
- May 8 – VE Day sees celebrations across the nation, but also the Halifax Riot.
- June 4 – 1945 Ontario general election: George Drew's PCs win a majority

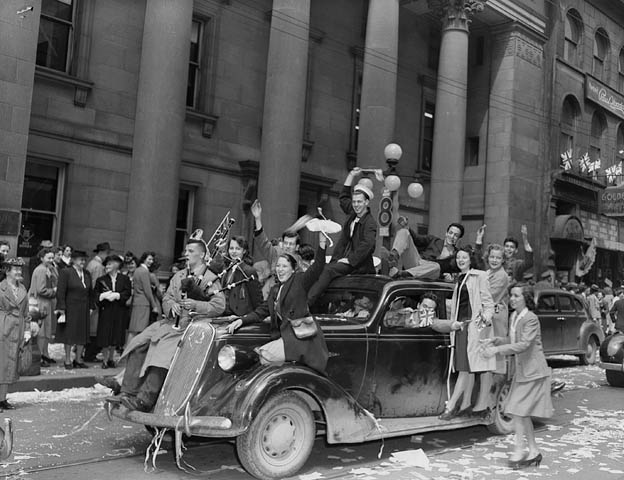
A V-E Day parade on Sparks Street, Ottawa (May 8, 1945)

- June 11 – Federal election: Mackenzie King's Liberals win a third consecutive majority
- June 26 – Canada is a founding member of the United Nations
- August 2 – The Canadian Armoured Corps becomes the Royal Canadian Armoured Corps
- August 15 – VJ Day marks the end of the Second World War. Over a million Canadians had fought in the conflict and 42,000 were killed.
- September 5 – The defection of Soviet embassy clerk Igor Gouzenko reveals a Soviet spy ring in Canada.
- September 8 – Angus Macdonald becomes premier of Nova Scotia for the second time, replacing Alexander MacMillan
- September 12 – The Ford Motor employees in Windsor, Ontario, go on strike.
- October 23 – Jackie Robinson signs a contract with the Montreal Royals baseball team.

=== Full date unknown ===
- Family allowance payments are introduced.
- Canada has its first trade surplus with the United States.

== Arts and literature ==
- The Tin Flute (Bonheur d'occasion) by Gabrielle Roy.

== Sport ==
- February 25 – Maurice Richard sets a new record for the most goals (50) in a single ice hockey season.
- April 22 – The Toronto Maple Leafs win their fifth Stanley Cup by defeating the Detroit Red Wings 4 games to 3.
- April 23 – The Ontario Hockey Association's Toronto St. Michael's Majors win their second Memorial Cup by defeating the Southern Saskatchewan Junior Hockey League's Moose Jaw Canucks 4 games to 1. All games were played at Maple Leaf Gardens in Toronto
- September 29 – The Calgary Stampeders are established
- December 1 – The Toronto Argonauts win their sixth Grey Cup by defeating the Winnipeg Blue Bombers 35 to 0 in the 33rd Grey Cup played in Varsity Stadium in Toronto.

== Births ==
=== January to March ===
- January 15 - Bonnie Burnard, novelist (d. 2017)
- January 18 - Steven Truscott, exonerated murderer
- January 21 - Len Derkach, politician
- January 23 - Mike Harris, politician and 22nd Premier of Ontario
- January 27
  - Harold Cardinal, writer, political leader, teacher, negotiator and lawyer (d. 2005)
  - Joe Ghiz, politician and 29th Premier of Prince Edward Island (d. 1996)
- February 5 - Nancy McCredie, track and field athlete
- February 19
  - Jim Bradley, politician
  - Bill Casey, politician
- February 20 - Donald McPherson, figure skater (d. 2001)
- March 4 - Patrick Boyer, politician and university professor
- March 6 - John A. MacNaughton, financier and executive (d. 2013)
- March 17 - Dave Bailey, track and field athlete (d. 2022)
- March 26 - Diane McGifford, politician
- March 28 - Bobby Schmautz, ice hockey player (d. 2021)

=== April to June ===
- April 12 - Doug Riley, keyboard player and producer (d. 2007)
- April 14 - John S. Hunkin, banker (d. 2025)
- May 3 – Leo Panitch, political scientist (d. 2020)
- May 27 - Bruce Cockburn, folk/rock guitarist and singer-songwriter
- June 11 - Robert Munsch, children's writer
- June 16 - Lucienne Robillard, politician and minister
- June 20 - Anne Murray, singer

=== July to September ===
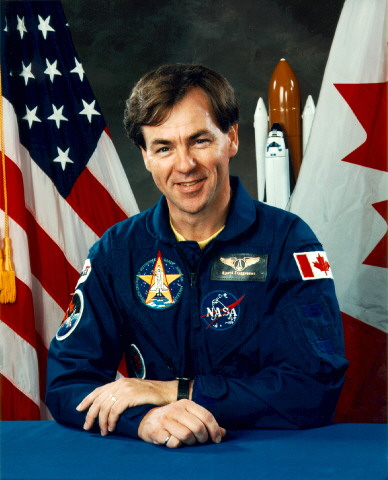
Bjarni Tryggvason

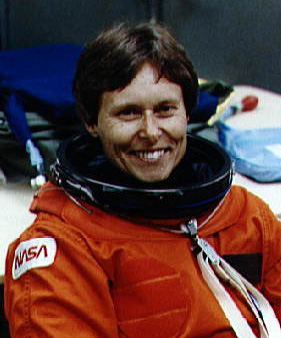
Roberta Bondar

- August 4 - Ben Sveinson, politician
- August 11 - David Walsh, businessman, disgraced head of Bre-X (d. 1998)
- August 12 - Mary Stewart, swimmer and world record breaker
- August 15 - Rosann Wowchuk, politician and Deputy Premier of Manitoba
- September 21 - Bjarni Tryggvason, engineer and astronaut (d. 2022)

=== October to December ===
- October 15 - John Murrell, playwright (d. 2019)
- November 5 - Jacques Lanctôt, member of the Front de libération du Québec (FLQ)
- November 11 - Norman Doyle, politician
- November 12 - Neil Young, singer-songwriter, musician and film director
- December 2 - Adele Armin, classical violinist (d. 2022)
- December 4 - Roberta Bondar, neurologist and Canada's first female astronaut
- December 24 - John Till, musician (d. 2022)

=== Full date unknown ===
- Felix Partz, artist and co-founder of the artistic collective General Idea (d. 1994)

== Deaths ==
- January 15 – Kate Simpson Hayes, playwright and legislative librarian (b. 1856)
- March 2 - Emily Carr, artist and writer (b. 1871)
- March 23 - Walter Charles Murray, first President of the University of Saskatchewan (b. 1866)
- July 17 - Adjutor Rivard, lawyer, writer, judge and linguist (b. 1868)
- October 24 - Franklin Carmichael, painter and Group of Seven member (b. 1890)
- November 1 - Marie Lacoste Gérin-Lajoie, feminist and social activist (b. 1867)
- December 10 - Joseph-Octave Samson, businessperson, politician and 28th Mayor of Quebec City (b. 1862)

== See also ==
- List of Canadian films
