= 1943 in Canada =

- Decades: 1920s; 1930s; 1940s; 1950s; 1960s
- See also: History of Canada; Timeline of Canadian history; List of years in Canada

Events from the year 1943 in Canada.

== Incumbents ==
=== Crown ===
- Monarch – George VI

=== Federal government ===
- Governor General – Alexander Cambridge, 1st Earl of Athlone
- Prime Minister – William Lyon Mackenzie King
- Chief Justice – Lyman Poore Duff (British Columbia)
- Parliament – 19th

=== Provincial governments ===
==== Lieutenant governors ====
- Lieutenant Governor of Alberta – John C. Bowen
- Lieutenant Governor of British Columbia – William Culham Woodward
- Lieutenant Governor of Manitoba – Roland Fairbairn McWilliams
- Lieutenant Governor of New Brunswick – William George Clark
- Lieutenant Governor of Nova Scotia – Henry Ernest Kendall
- Lieutenant Governor of Ontario – Albert Edward Matthews
- Lieutenant Governor of Prince Edward Island – Bradford William LePage
- Lieutenant Governor of Quebec – Eugène Fiset
- Lieutenant Governor of Saskatchewan – Archibald Peter McNab

==== Premiers ====
- Premier of Alberta – William Aberhart (until May 23) then Ernest Manning (from May 31)
- Premier of British Columbia – John Hart
- Premier of Manitoba – John Bracken (until January 14) then Stuart Garson
- Premier of New Brunswick – John McNair
- Premier of Nova Scotia – A.S. MacMillan
- Premier of Ontario – Gordon Daniel Conant (until May 18) then Harry Nixon (May 18 to August 17) then George A. Drew
- Premier of Prince Edward Island – Thane Campbell (until May 11) then J. Walter Jones
- Premier of Quebec – Adélard Godbout
- Premier of Saskatchewan – William John Patterson

=== Territorial governments ===
==== Commissioners ====
- Controller of Yukon – George A. Jeckell
- Commissioner of Northwest Territories – Charles Camsell

== Events ==
- January 8 – Stuart Garson becomes premier of Manitoba, replacing John Bracken, who had governed for 21 years.
- February 8 – HMCS Regina sinks Italian submarine Avorio near Philippeville, Algeria
- May 11 – J. Walter Jones becomes premier of Prince Edward Island, replacing Thane Campbell.
- May 18 – Harry Nixon becomes premier of Ontario, replacing Gordon Conant.
- May 23 – William Aberhart, premier of Alberta, dies in office.
- May 31 – Ernest Manning becomes premier of Alberta.
- July – The 1st Canadian Infantry Division is part of the invasion of Sicily.
- August 4 – Ontario election: George Drew's PCs win a minority, defeating Harry Nixon's Liberals.
- August 17 – George Drew becomes premier of Ontario, replacing Harry Nixon.
- August 19 – The Quebec Agreement is signed in Quebec City, between Canada, the United Kingdom and the United States.
- October 21 – HMCS Chedabucto sinks near Rimouski after an accidental collision with another ship.
- October 22 – The crew of German submarine U-537 sets up Weather Station Kurt near Martin Bay in Labrador.
- December 20 – December 27 – Battle of Ortona rages in Italy.

== Sport ==
- April 28 – The Manitoba Junior Hockey League's Winnipeg Rangers win their second Memorial Cup by defeating the Ontario Hockey Association's Oshawa Generals 4 games to 2. The deciding Game 6 was played at Maple Leaf Gardens in Toronto.
- November 27 – The Hamilton Flying Wildcats win their only Grey Cup by defeating the Winnipeg RCAF Bombers 23 to 14 in the 31st Grey Cup played at Varsity Stadium in Toronto.

== Births ==
=== January to March ===
- January 9 – Elmer MacFadyen, politician (d. 2007)
- January 10 – Carl Ray, artist (d. 1978)
- January 23 – Bill Cameron, news anchor, television producer, columnist and author (d. 2005)
- January 28 – Paul Henderson, ice hockey player
- February 19 – Art Hanger, politician
- February 23 – Charles Dalfen, chairperson of the Canadian Radio-television and Telecommunications Commission (d. 2009)
- February 27 – Gordon Earle, politician
- March 7 – Billy MacMillan, ice hockey coach and player (d. 2023)
- March 11 – Bob Plager, ice hockey player (d. 2021)
- March 15 – David Cronenberg, filmmaker, screenwriter and occasional actor
- March 25 – Loyola Hearn, diplomat and politician

=== April to June ===
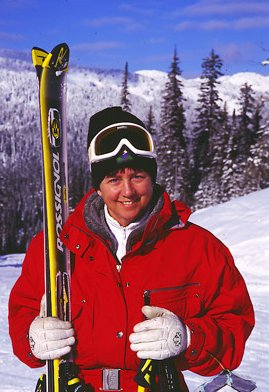
Nancy Greene

- April 1 – Shirley Render, politician
- April 2 – Alan Tonks, politician
- April 3 – Richard Manuel, composer, singer and multi-instrumentalist (d. 1986)
- April 12 – Jenny Meldrum, hurdler and heptathlete
- April 17 – Bobby Curtola, singer (d. 2016)
- April 22 – Edwin Tchorzewski, politician (d. 2008)
- May 11 – Nancy Greene Raine, alpine skier, Olympic gold medallist and World Champion, Senator
- June 5 – Jean-Claude Lord, film director and screenwriter (d. 2022)
- June 21 – Diane Marleau, politician and Minister (d. 2013)

=== July to September ===
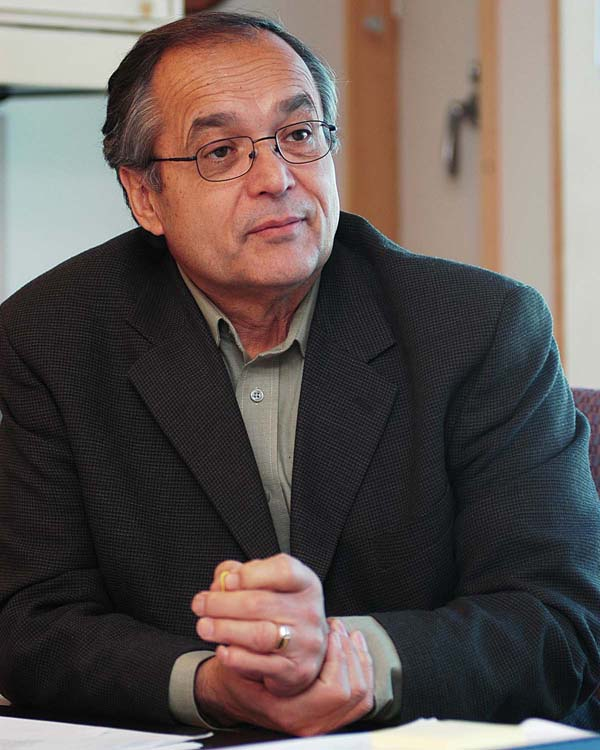
Joe Handley

- July 15 – John H. Bryden, politician, journalist and historian
- July 30 – Jean Friesen, politician
- July 31 – Ryan Larkin, animator, artist and sculptor (d. 2007)
- August 9 – Joe Handley, politician and 10th Premier of the Northwest Territories
- August 12 – Anne Cools, Senator
- August 29 – Arthur B. McDonald, astrophysicist, Nobel Prize in Physics winner
- September 9 – Daurene Lewis, politician and nation's first black female mayor (d. 2013)
- September 12 – Alain Dostie, cinematographer, film director and screenwriter
- September 12 – Michael Ondaatje, novelist and poet
- September 19 – Lyle Vanclief, politician and Minister
- September 22 – Maurice Baril, General and Chief of the Defence Staff
- September 27 – Randy Bachman, guitarist and songwriter

=== October to December ===
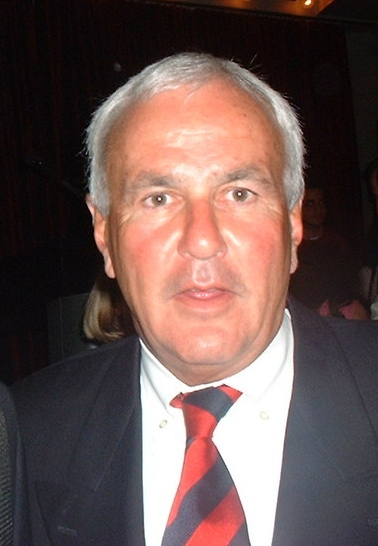
David Peterson in 2005

- October 16 – Paul Rose, convicted of murder and kidnapping of Pierre Laporte in 1970 and leader of PDS (1996–2002) (d. 2013)
- October 24 – Frank Pitura, politician (d. 2019)
- October 26 – Diane Gerace, high jumper
- November 7 – Joni Mitchell, musician, songwriter and painter
- November 13 – André-Gilles Fortin, politician (d. 1977)
- November 18 – Michael H. Rayner, public servant (d. 2004)
- November 22 – Yvan Cournoyer, ice hockey player
- November 27 – Nicole Brossard, poet and novelist
- December 2 – Larry Grossman, politician (d. 1997)
- December 13 – Ferguson Jenkins, baseball player
- December 14 – Linda McIntosh, politician
- December 21 – André Arthur, radio host and politician (d. 2022)
- December 23 – Margaret MacMillan, historian
- December 28 – David Peterson, politician and 20th Premier of Ontario
- December 29 – Rick Danko, musician and singer (d. 1999)
- December 30 – Linda Thom, shooter and Olympic gold medallist

== Deaths ==
- February 9 – Albert Hickman, politician and 17th Prime Minister of Newfoundland (b. 1875)
- May 23 – William Aberhart, politician and 8th Premier of Alberta (b. 1878)
- July 2 – Robert James Manion, politician (b. 1881)
- July 4 – Gordon Sidney Harrington, politician and Premier of Nova Scotia (b. 1883)
- July 12 – Joseph Boutin Bourassa, politician (b. 1853)
- October 18 – Albert Charles Saunders, jurist, politician and Premier of Prince Edward Island (b. 1874)
- November 26 – Charles G.D. Roberts, poet and prose writer (b. 1860)
- November 29 – Robert Hamilton Butts, politician (b. 1871)
- December 9 – Peter Dmytruk, World War II military hero (b. 1920)
- December 23 – Edgar Sydney Little, politician (b. 1885)

== See also ==
- List of Canadian films
