= 1944 in Canada =

- Decades: 1920s; 1930s; 1940s; 1950s; 1960s
- See also: History of Canada; Timeline of Canadian history; List of years in Canada

Events from the year 1944 in Canada.

== Incumbents ==
=== Crown ===
- Monarch – George VI

=== Federal government ===
- Governor General – Alexander Cambridge, 1st Earl of Athlone
- Prime Minister – William Lyon Mackenzie King
- Chief Justice – Lyman Poore Duff (British Columbia) (until 7 January) then Thibaudeau Rinfret (Quebec)
- Parliament – 19th

=== Provincial governments ===
==== Lieutenant governors ====
- Lieutenant Governor of Alberta – John C. Bowen
- Lieutenant Governor of British Columbia – William Culham Woodward
- Lieutenant Governor of Manitoba – Roland Fairbairn McWilliams
- Lieutenant Governor of New Brunswick – William George Clark
- Lieutenant Governor of Nova Scotia – Henry Ernest Kendall
- Lieutenant Governor of Ontario – Albert Edward Matthews
- Lieutenant Governor of Prince Edward Island – Bradford William LePage
- Lieutenant Governor of Quebec – Eugène Fiset
- Lieutenant Governor of Saskatchewan – Archibald Peter McNab

==== Premiers ====
- Premier of Alberta – Ernest Manning
- Premier of British Columbia – John Hart
- Premier of Manitoba – Stuart Garson
- Premier of New Brunswick – John McNair
- Premier of Nova Scotia – A.S. MacMillan
- Premier of Ontario – George A. Drew
- Premier of Prince Edward Island – J. Walter Jones
- Premier of Quebec – Adélard Godbout (until August 30) then Maurice Duplessis
- Premier of Saskatchewan – William John Patterson (until July 10) then Tommy Douglas

=== Territorial governments ===
==== Commissioners ====
- Controller of Yukon – George A. Jeckell
- Commissioner of Northwest Territories – Charles Camsell

== Events ==
- Conscription Crisis of 1944
- March 20 – Henry Duncan Graham Crerar becomes chief of the Canadian Army
- April 29 – World War II: HMCS Athabaskan is sunk in the English Channel
- June 6 – World War II: The 3rd Canadian Infantry Division lands at Juno Beach, part of the Invasion of Normandy
- June 7–17 – World War II: In the Ardenne Abbey massacre Waffen SS soldiers murder 20 Canadian prisoners of war.
- June 15 – Saskatchewan election: Tommy Douglas's Co-operative Commonwealth Federation wins a landslide majority, defeating William John Patterson's Liberals
- July 10 – Tommy Douglas becomes premier of Saskatchewan, replacing William Patterson
- July 23 – The First Canadian Army is activated in Normandy, becoming the largest combat force to ever be placed under Canadian command.
- August 1 – The House of Commons approves the Family Allowance Act
- August 8
  - Alberta election: Ernest Manning's Alberta Social Credit Party wins a third consecutive majority
  - The German submarine U-667 sinks HMCS Regina near Trevose Head, Cornwall, England, killing 30 sailors
- August 17 – World War II: The Canadian Army liberates Falaise
- August 30 – Maurice Duplessis becomes Premier of Quebec for the second time, replacing Adélard Godbout
- October 1 – World War II: The Battle of the Scheldt estuary begins
- October 13 – World War II: 1st Battalion The Black Watch (Royal Highland Regiment) of Canada suffers significant casualties in the action known in regimental lore as Black Friday
- October 14 – World War II: The German submarine U-1223 torpedoes HMCS Magog in the St Lawrence River. Magog is damaged beyond repair and three sailors are killed.
- October 21 – World War II: Smokey Smith earns the Victoria Cross on the Savio River in Italy.
- November 24–29: Because of a rumour that conscripts are about to deployed for overseas service, a significant number of conscripts stationed in Terrace, British Columbia, mutiny.
- November 25 – World War II: German submarine U-1228 sinks HMCS Shawinigan in the Cabot Strait. All 91 sailors of Shawinigan's crew are killed: the worst case of military deaths in Canadian territory during the war.
- December 24 – World War II: HMCS Clayoquot sunk off Halifax by German submarine U-806

== Sports ==
- April 13 – Montreal Canadiens win their fifth Stanley Cup by defeating the Chicago Black Hawks 4 games to 0. The deciding Game 4 was played at the Montreal Forum
- April 22 – Ontario Hockey Association's Oshawa Generals win their second Memorial Cup by defeating the Western Kootenay Junior Hockey League's Trail Smoke Eaters 4 games to 0. The deciding Game 4 was played at Maple Leaf Gardens in Toronto
- November 25 – St. Hyacinthe–Donnacona Navy win their only Grey Cup by defeating the Hamilton Flying Wildcats 7 to 6 in the 32nd Grey Cup played at Civic Stadium

== Births ==
=== January to June ===
- January 6 - John Efford, politician (d.2022)
- February 17 - Bruce Fogle, vet and author
- February 27 - André Roy, writer
- March 15 - Francis Mankiewicz, film director, screenwriter and producer (d.1993)
- March 26 - Benjamin Chee Chee, artist (d.1977)
- March 29 - Terry Jacks, singer, songwriter, record producer and environmentalist
- April 12 - Glen Cummings, politician
- May 4 - Fred Stanfield, ice hockey player (d.2021)
- May 13 - Brian Fawcett, writer (d.2022)
- May 20 - Elinor Caplan, politician and businesswoman
- May 28 - Rita MacNeil, singer-songwriter (d.2013)
- June 1 - Aileen Carroll, politician
- June 8 - Marc Ouellet, cardinal
- June 29 - Bob Kilger, politician
- June 29 - Charlie Watt, Senator

=== July to September ===
- July 5
  - Norma McCormick, politician
  - Robbie Robertson, singer-songwriter and guitarist
- July 30 - Mendelson Joe, singer-songwriter, guitarist and painter
- August 11 - Alexa McDonough, politician (d.2022)
- August 18 - David Newman, politician
- August 25 - Conrad Black, historian, columnist and publisher, appealing a fraud conviction in the United States
- September 1 - Harvey Thomas Strosberg, lawyer and academic
- September 3 - Brian Linehan, television host (d.2004)
- September 12 - Ron Ward, ice hockey player
- September 20 - Phil Fontaine, Aboriginal Canadian leader
- September 30
  - bpNichol, poet (d.1988)
  - Diane Dufresne, singer and painter

=== October to December ===
- November 17 -Lorne Michaels, television producer, writer and comedian
- December 4 - Anna McGarrigle, singer-songwriter
- December 12 - Peter Goldring, politician
- December 16 - Judy Sgro, politician
- December 16 - Mike Radcliffe, politician
- December 19 - Zal Yanovsky, rock musician (d.2002)
- December 24 - Daniel Johnson, Jr., politician and 25th Premier of Quebec
- December 24 - Dan Miller, politician and 32nd Premier of British Columbia

=== Full date unknown ===
- Jorge Zontal, artist and co-founder of the artistic collective General Idea (b.1994)

== Deaths ==
=== January to June ===
- January 9 - John Wesley Dafoe, journalist and author (b.1866)

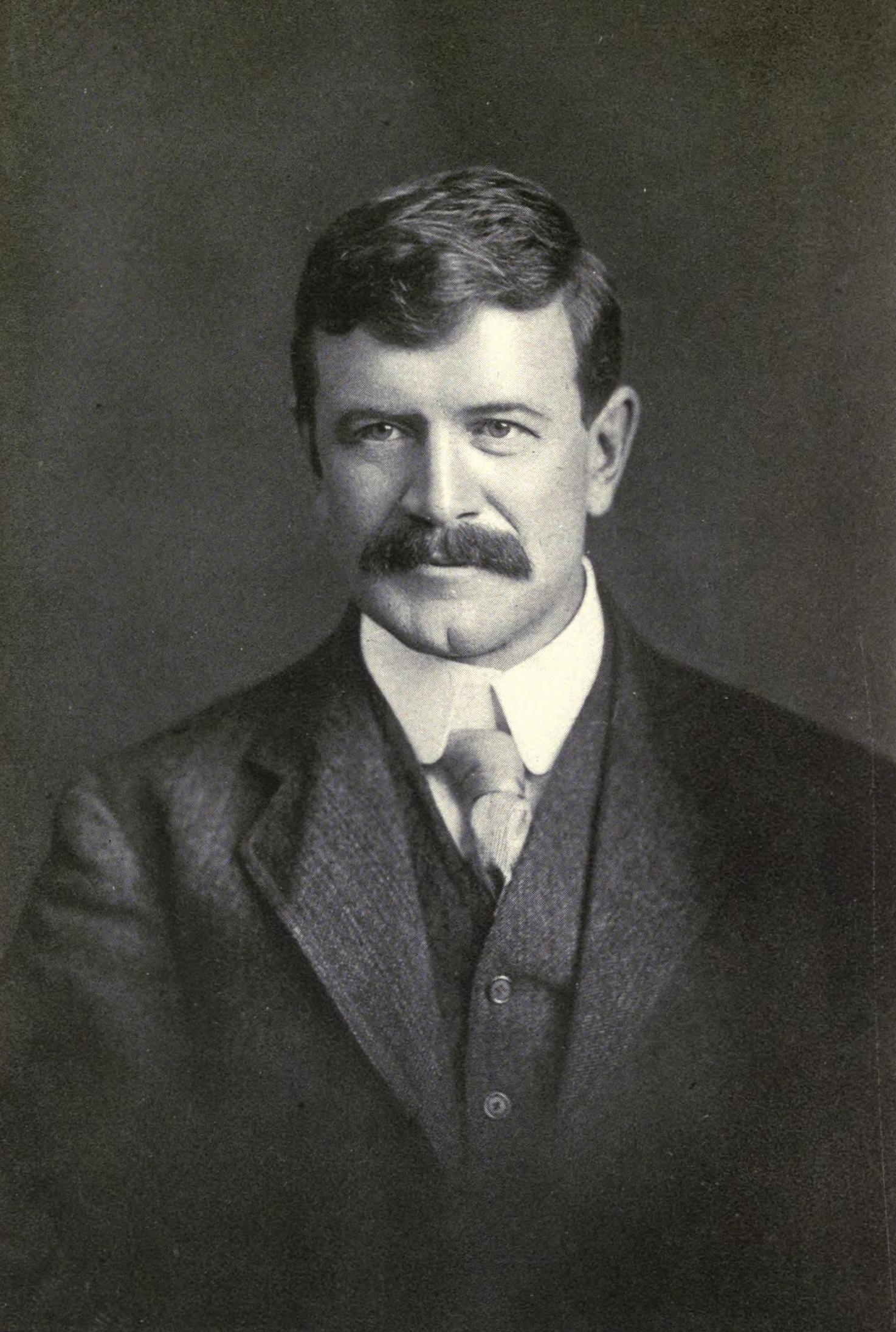
Stephen Leacock

- February 6 - Arthur Sauvé, politician (b.1874)
- March 9 - Roy Brown, World War I flying ace (b.1893)
- March 28 - Stephen Leacock, writer and economist (b.1869)

=== July to December ===
- July 27 - Clifford William Robinson, lawyer, businessman, politician and 11th Premier of New Brunswick (b.1866)
- September 5 - Gustave Biéler, Special Operations Executive agent during World War II (b.1904)
- September 9 - John Stuart Foster, physicist (b.1890)
- September 14 - John Kenneth Macalister, World War II hero (b.1914)
- September 14 - Frank Pickersgill, World War II hero (b.1915)
- September 14 - Roméo Sabourin, World War II hero (b.1923)
- September 27 - Aimee Semple McPherson, evangelist (b.1890)
- October 1 - William Mulock, politician and Minister (b.1844)
- November 3 - Jack Miner, conservationist (b.1865)
- November 26 - Henry Cockshutt, Lieutenant Governor of Ontario (b.1868)
