= 1939 in Canada =

- Decades: 1910s; 1920s; 1930s; 1940s; 1950s
- See also: History of Canada; Timeline of Canadian history; List of years in Canada

Events from the year 1939 in Canada.

== Incumbents ==
=== Crown ===
- Monarch – George VI

=== Federal government ===
- Governor General – John Buchan
- Prime Minister – William Lyon Mackenzie King
- Chief Justice – Lyman Poore Duff (British Columbia)
- Parliament – 18th

=== Provincial governments ===
==== Lieutenant governors ====
- Lieutenant Governor of Alberta – John C. Bowen
- Lieutenant Governor of British Columbia – Eric Hamber
- Lieutenant Governor of Manitoba – William Johnston Tupper
- Lieutenant Governor of New Brunswick – Murray MacLaren
- Lieutenant Governor of Nova Scotia – Robert Irwin
- Lieutenant Governor of Ontario – Albert Edward Matthews
- Lieutenant Governor of Prince Edward Island – George DesBrisay DeBlois (until September 11) then Bradford William LePage
- Lieutenant Governor of Quebec – Esioff-Léon Patenaude (until December 30) then Eugène Fiset
- Lieutenant Governor of Saskatchewan – Archibald Peter McNab

==== Premiers ====
- Premier of Alberta – William Aberhart
- Premier of British Columbia – Thomas Dufferin Pattullo
- Premier of Manitoba – John Bracken
- Premier of New Brunswick – Allison Dysart
- Premier of Nova Scotia – Angus Lewis Macdonald
- Premier of Ontario – Mitchell Hepburn
- Premier of Prince Edward Island – Thane Campbell
- Premier of Quebec – Maurice Duplessis (until November 9) then Adélard Godbout
- Premier of Saskatchewan – William John Patterson

=== Territorial governments ===
==== Commissioners ====
- Controller of Yukon – George A. Jeckell
- Commissioner of Northwest Territories – Charles Camsell

== Events ==
- May 17 – King George VI and Queen Elizabeth begin their royal tour of Canada, eventually visiting every province and Newfoundland.
- September 3 – The Department of Labour establishes the Wartime Prices and Trade Board to control inflation.
- September 7 – Prime Minister Mackenzie King calls for a special session of Parliament, to discuss a declaration of war versus Nazi Germany. The session lasts until September 13.
- September 10 – World War II: Canada declares war on Germany, one week after the United Kingdom does so.
- September 11 – World War II: Canada establishes a High Commission of Canada in Australia. Australia reciprocates the next day.
- September 16 – World War II: The Royal Canadian Navy escorts the first of many transatlantic convoys.
- September 28 – World War II: Air training facilities are set up in Canada to train pilots from Britain and the rest of the Empire.
- October 25 – The Quebec election is won by the Liberals under Joseph-Adélard Godbout.
- December 17 – World War II: The 1st Canadian Infantry Division lands in Scotland en route to England. The division is accompanied by a team of announcers and technicians, who set up Radio Canada's overseas service.
- November 9 – Adélard Godbout becomes premier of Quebec for the second time, replacing Maurice Duplessis.

=== Year-long ===
- Canada expands its international presence by establishing High Commissions in Australia, Ireland, New Zealand and South Africa.

== Sport ==
- February 12 – The Trail Smoke Eaters win the 1939 Ice Hockey World Championships for Canada.
- April 16 – The Boston Bruins win their second Stanley Cup (and last until 1970) by defeating the Toronto Maple Leafs 4 games to 1.
- April 17 – The Ontario Hockey Association's Oshawa Generals win their first Memorial Cup by defeating the Edmonton Junior Hockey League's Edmonton Athletic Club Roamers 3 games to 1. The deciding Game 4 was played at Maple Leaf Gardens in Toronto.
- December 9 – The Winnipeg Blue Bombers win their second Grey Cup by defeating the Ottawa Rough Riders 8 to 7 in the 27th Grey Cup played in Lansdowne Park in Ottawa.

== Births ==
=== January to March ===
- January 3 - Bobby Hull, ice hockey player (d. 2023)
- January 11 - Anne Heggtveit, alpine skier and Olympic gold medalist.

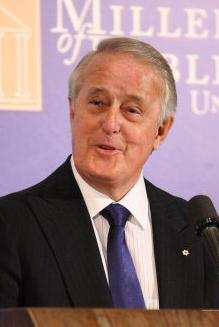
Brian Mulroney

- January 14 - Martha Gibson, actress
- January 19 - Grant Notley, politician (d. 1984)
- February 3 - Ovid Jackson, politician
- February 10 - Adrienne Clarkson, journalist and 26th Governor General of Canada
- March 1 - Marlene Catterall, politician
- March 5 - Peter Woodcock, serial killer and child rapist (d. 2010)
- March 8 - Lynn Seymour, ballerina (d. 2023)
- March 17 - Bill Graham, politician (d. 2022)
- March 20 - Brian Mulroney, politician and 18th Prime Minister of Canada (d. 2024)
- March 26 - Patrick Lane, poet (d. 2019)

=== April to June ===
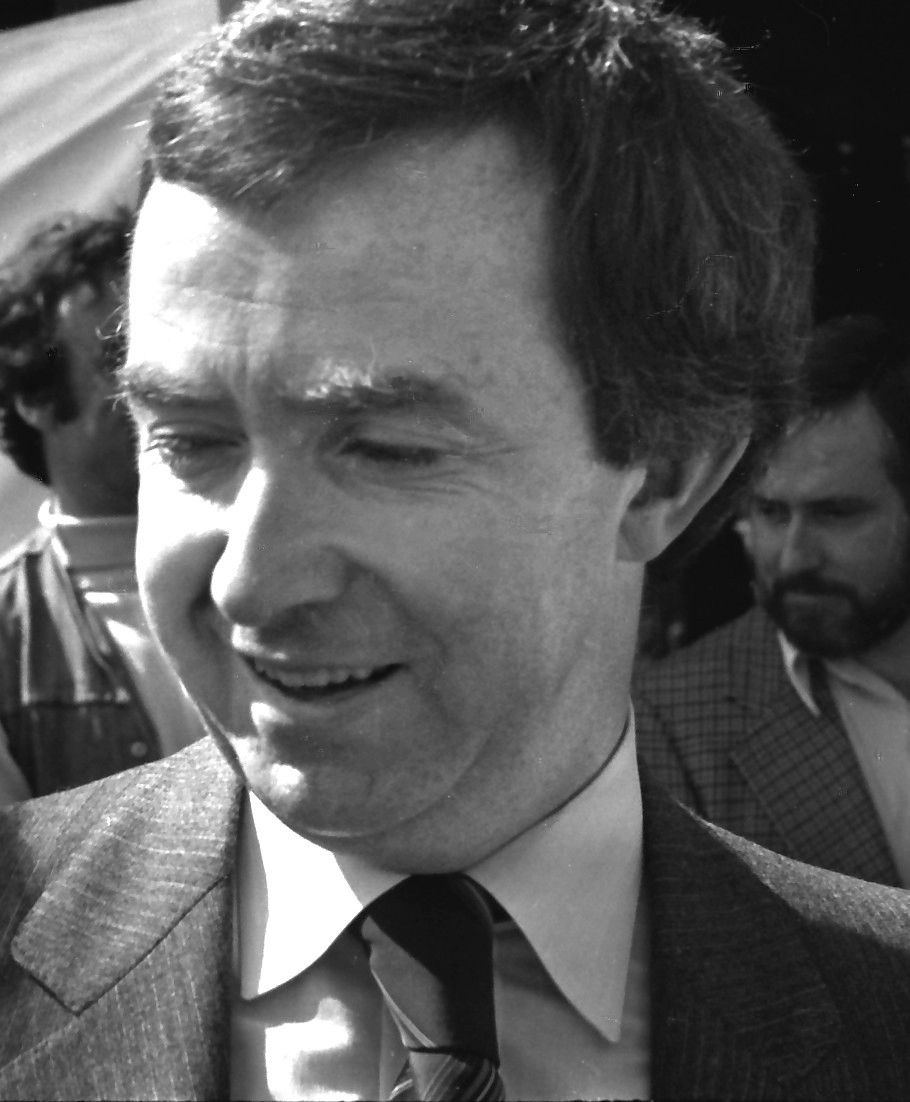
Joe Clark

- April 14 - Ian Binnie, jurist and puisne justice on the Supreme Court of Canada
- April 20 - Wayson Choy, writer (d. 2019)
- April 24 - Dan Hays, politician
- April 24 - Ernst Zündel, German-born neo-Nazi, Holocaust denier and pamphleteer (d. 2017)
- May 7 - Sidney Altman, molecular biologist, joint 1989 Nobel Prize in Chemistry laureate (d. 2022)
- May 11 - Ken Epp, politician (d. 2022)
- May 16 - Roger Soloman, politician (d. 2021)
- May 26 - Gerry McAlpine, politician
- June 5 - Joe Clark, journalist, politician, statesman, businessman, professor and 16th Prime Minister of Canada.
- June 23 - Jack MacIsaac, politician

=== July to September ===
- July 12 - David Bazay, television journalist (d. 2005)
- July 19 - Ray Turnbull, curler (d. 2017)
- July 25 - Catherine Callbeck, politician and 30th Premier of Prince Edward Island
- August 12 - Roy Romanow, politician and 12th Premier of Saskatchewan
- August 15
  - Hardial Bains, founder and leader of Communist Party of Canada (Marxist-Leninist) (d. 1997)
  - Derek Holmes, ice hockey player (d. 2025)
- August 23 - Isabel Bassett, broadcaster and politician
- August 31 - Dennis Lee, poet and children's writer
- September 1 - Jake Epp, politician
- September 2 - Henry Mintzberg, academic and author on business and management
- September 4 - Jim Penner, businessman and politician (d. 2004)
- September 10 – Jim Pappin, ice hockey player (d. 2022)
- September 11 – Lyse Richer, administrator and music teacher
- September 30 - Len Cariou, actor

=== October to December ===
- October 5 - Marie-Claire Blais, novelist, poet and playwright (d. 2021)
- November 6 - Joyce Fairbairn, Senator and first woman to serve as Leader of the Government in the Senate (d. 2022)
- November 18 - Margaret Atwood, author, poet, critic, feminist and social campaigner
- November 23 - Bill Bissett, poet
- November 30 - Louis LeBel, jurist and puisne justice on the Supreme Court of Canada
- December 2 - Francis Fox, politician, minister and senator
- December 21 - Lloyd Axworthy, politician and minister
- December 24 - James Bartleman, diplomat, author and 27th Lieutenant Governor of Ontario

=== Full date unknown ===
- Michael Estok, poet (d. 1989)
- Michael Overs, businessman, founder and owner of Pizza Pizza Limited (d. 2010)
- Tony Parsons, journalist and television news anchor
- Robin Spry, filmmaker and television producer (d. 2005)

== Deaths ==
- January 24 - Alfred Edmond Bourgeois, politician (b. 1872)
- March 7 - Sir Joseph Flavelle, businessman (b. 1858)
- March 8 - Henry Pellatt, financier and soldier (b. 1859)
- May 6 - Edward S. Rogers, Sr., inventor and radio pioneer (b. 1900)
- July 12 - Fernand Rinfret, politician (b. 1883)
- July 30 - Sir Charles Blair Gordon, industrialist and banker, president of the Bank of Montreal (b. 1867)
- August 21 - Francis Patrick O'Connor, businessman, politician and philanthropist (b. 1885)
- November 12 - Norman Bethune, physician and medical innovator (b. 1890)
- November 28 - James Naismith, sports coach and innovator, inventor of basketball (b. 1861)
- December 22 - Herbert James Palmer, politician and Premier of Prince Edward Island (b. 1851)
- December 27 – Napoléon Turcot, politician (b. 1867)

=== Full date unknown ===
- Constance Piers, journalist, poet and editor (b. 1866)

== See also ==
- List of Canadian films
