= 1858 in Canada =

- Decades: 1830s; 1840s; 1850s; 1860s; 1870s
- See also: History of Canada; Timeline of Canadian history; List of years in Canada

Events from the year 1858 in Canada.

== Incumbents ==
- Monarch — Victoria

=== Federal government ===
- Parliament — 6th

=== Governors ===
- Governor General of the Province of Canada — Edmund Walker Head
- Colonial Governor of Newfoundland — Alexander Bannerman
- Governor of Nova Scotia — George Phipps, 2nd Marquess of Normanby
- Governor of Prince Edward Island — Dominick Daly

=== Premiers ===
- Joint Premiers of the Province of Canada —
  - George-Étienne Cartier, Canada West Premier
  - Antoine-Aimé Dorion, Canada East Premier
- Premier of Newfoundland — John Kent
- Premier of New Brunswick — Samuel Leonard Tilley
- Premier of Nova Scotia — James William Johnston
- Premier of Prince Edward Island — Edward Palmer

== Events ==
- The Frontenac County Court House opens.
- The Canadian government imposes revenue tariffs on US manufactured goods to pay for railroad debts.
- The Province of Canada releases its first decimal coinage into circulation, minted in England.
- The Halifax-Truro line begins rail service.
- The Fraser Canyon Gold Rush starts, leading to the creation of the Colony of British Columbia on the Mainland and igniting the Fraser Canyon War.
  - Chinese, German, Norwegian, Jews, American, Irish, Latin American, French, Belgian Canadian and other immigrants who had been in the California goldfields arrive in British Columbia, attracted by the Fraser River Gold rush, joining French Canadians, Métis, Hawaiians and others already in the area who abandoned regular employment to work the banks of the Fraser alongside the native peoples, who also took part in the rush.
  - About 600 African-Americans from California move to Victoria, British Columbia by invitation of Governor James Douglas as part of the gold rush migration. One of them, Mifflin Gibbs, later plays a key role in persuading British Columbia to become part of Canada. Douglas declares Emancipation Day, August 1, the anniversary of the end of slavery in the British Empire, as the colonies' first official holiday August 1, to the chagrin of the white American element in the colony, though Victoria's West Indian police force, recruited by Douglas, was necessarily disbanded because of the hostility from the numerous Americans in the emerging city. Also among the African-Americans who came with the gold rush was Isaac "Ikey" Dixon, whose brawl in his Yale barbershop and subsequent safe-custody arrest triggered off the events known as McGowan's War, and who soon after became a noted and popular columnist for the Barkerville newspaper The Cariboo Sentinel.
- The Toronto Islands are created after a fierce storm detaches the island from the mainland at the Eastern gap.
- The British Columbia Provincial Police are established.
- New Westminster became the capital city of the Colony of British Columbia.

== Births ==
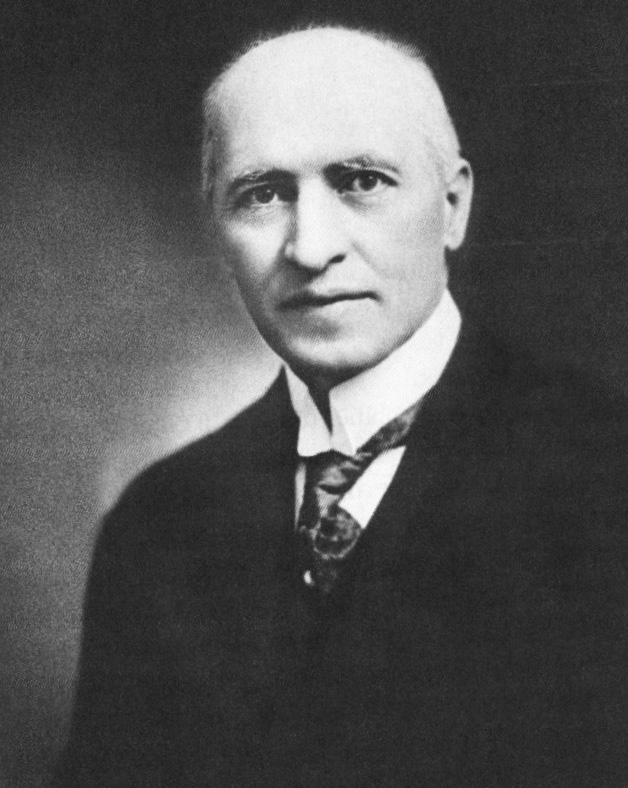
Arthur Sifton

- February 15 – Joseph Flavelle, businessman (died 1939)
- June 1 – Phoebe Amelia Watson, painter and curator (died 1947)
- August 8 – Ralph Smith, coal miner, labor leader and politician (died 1917)
- September 16 – Bonar Law, politician and Prime Minister of the United Kingdom (died 1923)
- September 28 – Charles Hill-Tout, anthropologist
- October 26 – Arthur Sifton, politician and 2nd Premier of Alberta (died 1921)
- November 1 – Joseph Tyrrell, geologist, cartographer and mining consultant (died 1957)

== Deaths ==
- June 29 – William Morris, businessman, militia officer, justice of the peace, politician, and school administrator (born 1786)
- December 9 – Robert Baldwin, politician (born 1804)
