= 1946 in Canada =

- Decades: 1920s; 1930s; 1940s; 1950s; 1960s
- See also: History of Canada; Timeline of Canadian history; List of years in Canada

Events from the year 1946 in Canada.

== Incumbents ==
=== Crown ===
- Monarch – George VI

=== Federal government ===
- Governor General – the Earl of Athlone (until April 12) then the Viscount Alexander of Tunis
- Prime Minister – William Lyon Mackenzie King
- Chief Justice – Thibaudeau Rinfret (Quebec)
- Parliament – 20th

=== Provincial governments ===
==== Lieutenant governors ====
- Lieutenant Governor of Alberta – John C. Bowen
- Lieutenant Governor of British Columbia – William C Woodward (until October 1) then Charles Arthur Banks
- Lieutenant Governor of Manitoba – Roland Fairbairn McWilliams
- Lieutenant Governor of New Brunswick – David Laurence MacLaren
- Lieutenant Governor of Nova Scotia – Henry Ernest Kendall
- Lieutenant Governor of Ontario – Albert Edward Matthews (until December 26) then Ray Lawson
- Lieutenant Governor of Prince Edward Island – Joseph Alphonsus Bernard
- Lieutenant Governor of Quebec – Eugène Fiset
- Lieutenant Governor of Saskatchewan – Reginald John Marsden Parker

==== Premiers ====
- Premier of Alberta – Ernest Manning
- Premier of British Columbia – John Hart
- Premier of Manitoba – Stuart Garson
- Premier of New Brunswick – John McNair
- Premier of Nova Scotia – Angus Macdonald
- Premier of Ontario – George A. Drew
- Premier of Prince Edward Island – J. Walter Jones
- Premier of Quebec – Maurice Duplessis
- Premier of Saskatchewan – Tommy Douglas

=== Territorial governments ===
==== Commissioners ====
- Controller of Yukon – George A. Jeckell
- Commissioner of Northwest Territories – Charles Camsell

== Events ==
- January 21 – The Bluenose sinks off Haiti.
- May 14 – The Canadian Citizenship Act, 1946 is passed. It creates Canadian citizenship separate from the British.
- May 31 – All Japanese-Canadians ordered deported to Japan.
- April 12 – Sir Harold Alexander appointed the new Governor General of Canada, replacing the Earl of Athlone.
- June 23 – The 1946 Vancouver Island earthquake affects Vancouver Island and mainland British Columbia.
- June 27 – Canadian Citizenship Act 1946 is enacted, defining a Canadian citizen and including a reference to being a British subject.
- July 15 – A royal commission investigates a Soviet spy ring in Canada. Secret information was found to be leaked and among the Canadians held suspect was the one parliamentary delegate of the Labor-Progressive (Communist) Party.
- August 3 – A Canadian wheat agreement provided for British purchases of large amounts of Canadian wheat at prices considerably below the world market.
- October 14 – Canada Savings Bonds introduced for the first time.
- November 8 - Viola Desmond refuses to leave her seat in a movie theatre and is arrested.
- The Canadian Army Command and Staff College is established.

== Arts and literature ==
- January 8 – Betty Beaumont, Canadian American site-specific artist, all media
- August 29 – Leona Gom, Canadian poet and novelist
- October 28 – Sharon Thesen, Canadian poet
- November 7 – Diane Francis, Canadian journalist and author

== Sport ==
- April 9 - The Montreal Canadiens win their sixth Stanley Cup by defeating the Boston Bruins four games to one. The deciding Game 5 was played at the Montreal Forum.
- April 27 - The Manitoba Junior Hockey League's Winnipeg Monarchs win their third (and final) Memorial Cup by defeating the Ontario Hockey Association Toronto St. Michael's Majors four games to three. All games were played at Maple Leaf Gardens in Toronto.
- November - The New York Knicks win the first National Basketball Association game by defeating the Toronto Huskies 68–66 at Maple Leaf Gardens in Toronto.
- November 30 - The Toronto Argonauts win their seventh Grey Cup by defeating the Winnipeg Blue Bombers 28 to 6 in the 34th Grey Cup at Varsity Stadium in Toronto.
- Date unknown:
  - The Western Interprovincial Football Union resumes play for the first time since 1942
  - The Montreal Alouettes join the Interprovincial Rugby Football Union
  - Herb Trawick of the Alouettes becomes the first black player of professional football in Canada

== Births ==
=== January to March ===
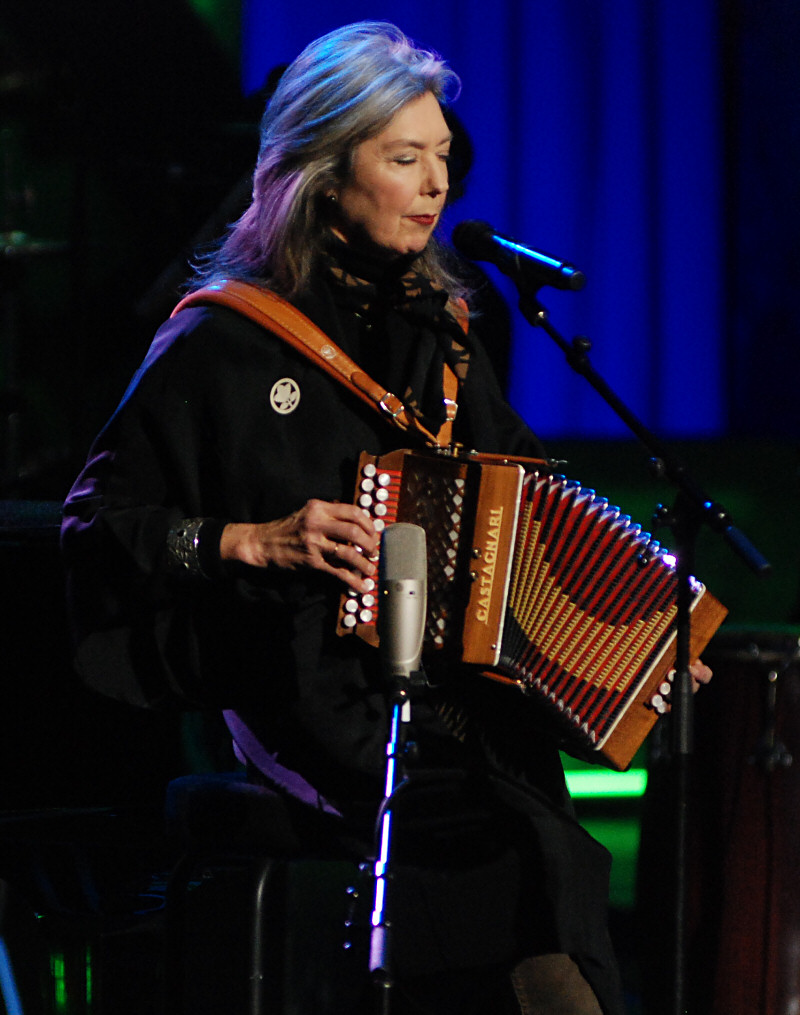
Kate McGarrigle at the 2008 Canadian Songwriters Hall of Fame gala

- January 10 – Alexis Nihon, Jr., real estate businessman, Olympic wrestler for The Bahamas (1968) (d. 2013)
- January 15 – Veronica Tennant, ballet dancer and dance and performance film producer and director
- January 17 – Domenic Troiano, rock guitarist (d. 2004)
- January 18 – Paul Shmyr, ice hockey player (d. 2005)
- January 22 – Serge Savard, ice hockey player
- January 30 – Jean-Paul Daoust, writer
- February 6 – Kate McGarrigle, folk music singer-songwriter (d. 2010)
- March 1 – Gerry Boulet, rock singer (d.1990)
- March 5 – Richard Bell, musician (d. 2007)
- March 6 – Marcel Proulx, politician
- March 7 – Elaine McCoy, politician (d. 2020)
- March 11 – Paul DeVillers, politician
- March 19 – Donny Gerrard, singer (d. 2022)
- March 22 – Rivka Golani, viola player
- March 26 – Marion Boyd, politician (d. 2022)

=== April to June ===
- April 11 – Donald Orchard, politician
- April 15 – David Chatters, politician
- April 20 – Julien Poulin, actor, director, producer, and screenwriter (d. 2025)
- April 24 – Doug Christie, lawyer and free speech activist (d. 2013)
- April 26 – Lorne Nystrom, politician
- April 28 – Ginette Reno, author, composer, singer and actress
- May 17 – Joan Barfoot, novelist
- May 18 – Rod Zaine, ice hockey player (d. 2022)
- May 20 – Donald Cameron, politician and Premier of Nova Scotia (d. 2021)
- May 30 – Don Ferguson, actor and comedian
- June 17 – Ernie Eves, politician and 33rd Premier of Ontario
- June 24 – David Collenette, politician
- June 25 – Andy Anstett, politician
- June 25 – Roméo Dallaire, senator, humanitarian, author and retired general

=== July to September ===
- July 1 – Rosalie Abella, jurist
- July 5 – Pierre-Marc Johnson, lawyer, physician, politician and 24th Premier of Quebec
- July 6 – John Honderich, businessman and editor (d. 2022)
- July 10 – Roger Abbott, comedian (d. 2011)
- July 19 – Dennis Mills, politician and businessman
- August 8 – Richard Johnston, politician, educator and administrator
- August 29 – Leona Gom, poet and novelist
- September 4
  - Eric Malling, television journalist (d. 1998)
  - Greg Sorbara, politician
- September 9
  - Lawrence MacAulay, politician
  - Bruce Palmer, musician (Buffalo Springfield) (d. 2004)

=== October to December ===
- October 16 – Elizabeth Witmer, politician
- October 28 – Sharon Thesen, poet
- November 4 – Robert Davidson, artist
- November 12 – Peter Milliken, lawyer and politician
- November 17 – Petra Burka, figure skater, Olympic bronze medallist, World Champion and coach
- November 17 – Bob McBride, singer (d. 1998)
- November 22 – Anne Wheeler, film and television writer, producer and director
- November 26 – Andreas Schroeder, poet, novelist and nonfiction writer
- December 14 – Paul Forseth, politician
- December 17
  - Margot Lemire, writer, poet and playwright (d. 2024)
  - Eugene Levy, actor, television director, producer, musician and writer

== Deaths ==
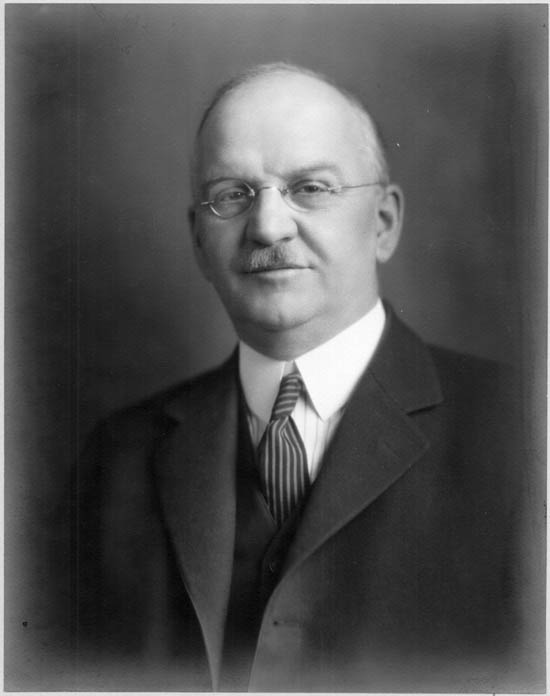
Howard Ferguson

- January 21 – Napoleon Lemay, politician (b. 1865)
- February 15 – Ernest Howard Armstrong, journalist, politician and Premier of Manitoba (b. 1864)
- February 21 – Howard Ferguson, politician and 9th Premier of Ontario (b. 1870)
- April 20 – Egerton Reuben Stedman, politician (b. 1872)
- August 17 – John Patrick Barry, politician and lawyer (b. 1893)
- September 9 – Aimé Boucher, politician and notary (b. 1877)
- October 23 – Ernest Thompson Seton, author and wildlife artist (b. 1860)
- December 6 – Charles Stewart, politician and 3rd Premier of Alberta (b. 1868)
- December 25 – Charles Ernest Gault, politician (b. 1861)
- December 27 – John Babington Macaulay Baxter, lawyer, jurist and 18th Premier of New Brunswick (b. 1868)
- December 29 – James Thomas Milton Anderson, politician and 5th Premier of Saskatchewan (b. 1878)

=== Full date unknown ===
- John Queen, politician (b.1882)
