= Governor Head =

Governor Head may refer to:

- Edmund Walker Head (1805–1868), Governor General of the Province of Canada from 1854 to 1861
- Francis Bond Head (1793–1875), Lieutenant-Governor of Upper Canada during the rebellion of 1837
