= 1713 in Canada =

- Decades: 1690s; 1700s; 1710s; 1720s; 1730s
- See also: History of Canada; Timeline of Canadian history; List of years in Canada

Events from the year 1713 in Canada.

== Incumbents ==
- French Monarch: Louis XIV
- British and Irish Monarch: Anne

=== Governors ===
- Governor General of New France: Philippe de Rigaud Vaudreuil
- Colonial Governor of Louisiana: Jean-Baptiste Le Moyne de Bienville then Antoine de la Mothe Cadillac
- Governor of Nova Scotia: Francis Nicholson
- Governor of Plaisance: Philippe Pastour de Costebelle

== Events ==
- The Treaty of Utrecht. The French cede Newfoundland and the Hudson Bay region. They retain Cape Breton Island and Île Saint-Jean (Prince Edward Island).
- Treaty of Utrecht cedes French Acadia, Newfoundland, Hudson Bay and the "country of the Iroquois" to England.
- The Treaty of Utrecht ends Queen Anne's War, confirming British possession of Hudson Bay, Newfoundland and Acadia (except Île-Royale Cape Breton Island). France starts building Fortress Louisbourg near the eastern tip of Île-Royale.

== Births ==
- Jean Baptiste de La Vérendrye born September 3, the eldest son of Pierre Gaultier de Varennes, sieur de La Vérendrye (died 1736).
- Michel Bénard, councillor of the conseil souverain.

== Deaths ==
There were no relevant deaths during this year in Canada.
