= 1859 in Canada =

- Decades: 1830s; 1840s; 1850s; 1860s; 1870s
- See also: History of Canada; Timeline of Canadian history; List of years in Canada

Events from the year 1859 in Canada.

== Incumbents ==
- Monarch — Victoria

=== Federal government ===
- Parliament — 6th

=== Governors ===
- Governor General of the Province of Canada — Edmund Walker Head
- Colonial Governor of Newfoundland — Alexander Bannerman
- Governor of New Brunswick — Arthur Charles Hamilton-Gordon
- Governor of Nova Scotia — George Phipps, 2nd Marquess of Normanby
- Governor of Prince Edward Island — Dominick Daly

=== Premiers ===
- Joint Premiers of the Province of Canada —
  - George-Étienne Cartier, Canada West Premier
  - Antoine-Aimé Dorion, Canada East Premier
- Premier of Newfoundland — John Kent
- Premier of New Brunswick — Samuel Leonard Tilley
- Premier of Nova Scotia — James William Johnston
- Premier of Prince Edward Island — Edward Palmer

== Events ==
- Abraham Shadd is elected to the town council in Raleigh, Ontario and becomes the first Black elected to public office.
- William Hall, becomes the first Nova Scotian and the first Black person to win the Victoria Cross.
- The all-Black Victoria Pioneer Rifle Company is formed to defend British Columbia.
- De Stoeckl returns to U.S. from Saint Petersburg with authority to negotiate the sale of Alaska.
- McGowan's War, a juridical and political crisis in the Fraser River goldfields involving a spillover of San Francisco politics into British territory, has the potential to escalate into an annexationist uprising but is settled peaceably. Marines and Royal Engineers are dispatched to Yale, led by Colonel Clement Francis Moody and escorting Justice Matthew Baillie Begbie to resolve the matter, which ends amicably, and reassert British sovereignty over the fledgling Mainland Colony.
- Lyman Cutlar, an American settler, homesteads on San Juan Island in defiance of British claims and triggers off the Pig War.

=== Full date unknown ===
- Black Rock, Montreal completed
- 1859 Newfoundland general election

== Births ==
=== January to June ===
- January 6 – Henry Pellatt, financier and soldier (died 1939)
- January 17 – Joseph Ovide Brouillard, politician and businessman (died 1940)
- January 18 – Elizabeth Shortt, politician
- February 21 – William Proudfoot, politician and barrister (died 1922)
- April 5 – Robert Franklin Sutherland, politician and Speaker of the House of Commons of Canada (died 1922)
- May 8 – Edward Morris, 1st Baron Morris, politician and 2nd Prime Minister of Newfoundland (died 1935)
- June 25 – George Henry Bradbury, politician (died 1925)

=== July to December ===
- July 12 – Peter Vasilevich Verigin, philosopher, activist and leader and preacher of the Doukhobors (died 1924)
- July 20 – Lionel Herbert Clarke, businessman and Lieutenant Governor of Ontario (died 1921)
- August 4 – Louis-Adolphe Paquet, theologian (died 1942)
- August 10 – Wellington Willoughby, politician and lawyer (died 1932)
- September 17 – Frank Dawson Adams, geologist (died 1942)
- November 8 – Paul-Eugène Roy, Roman Catholic priest, and Archbishop of Quebec (died 1926)

== Deaths ==
- February 22 – Edmond Baird, cabinet-maker and upholsterer (born 1802)
- March 2 – Hugh Cossart Baker, Sr., banker, businessman and mathematician (born 1818)
- March 23 – Jacob De Witt, businessman, politician, and justice of the peace (born 1785)
- December 30 – Bernard Donald Macdonald, Roman Catholic priest, bishop, and school administrator (born 1797)
