= 1947 in Canada =

- Decades: 1920s; 1930s; 1940s; 1950s; 1960s
- See also: History of Canada; Timeline of Canadian history; List of years in Canada

Events from the year 1947 in Canada.

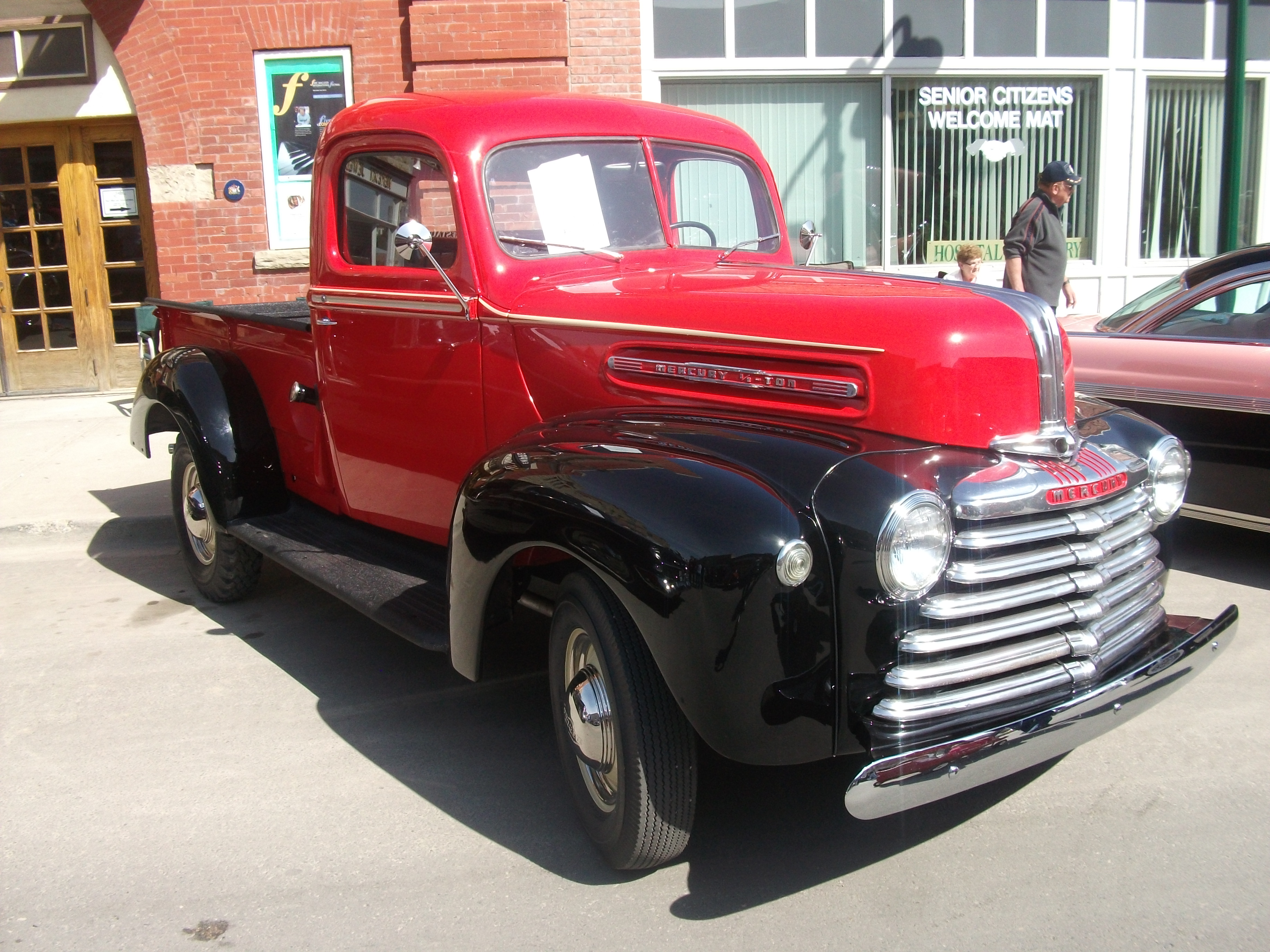
1947 Mercury pickup truck, made by Ford Motor Company of Canada. Photographed in Fort Macleod, Alberta, 2010.

== Incumbents ==
=== Crown ===
- Monarch – George VI

=== Federal government ===
- Governor General – the Viscount Alexander of Tunis
- Prime Minister – William Lyon Mackenzie King
- Chief Justice – Thibaudeau Rinfret (Quebec)
- Parliament – 20th

=== Provincial governments ===
==== Lieutenant governors ====
- Lieutenant Governor of Alberta – John C. Bowen
- Lieutenant Governor of British Columbia – Charles Arthur Banks
- Lieutenant Governor of Manitoba – Roland Fairbairn McWilliams
- Lieutenant Governor of New Brunswick – David Laurence MacLaren
- Lieutenant Governor of Nova Scotia – Henry Ernest Kendall (until August 12) then J.A.D. McCurdy
- Lieutenant Governor of Ontario – Ray Lawson
- Lieutenant Governor of Prince Edward Island – Joseph Alphonsus Bernard
- Lieutenant Governor of Quebec – Eugène Fiset
- Lieutenant Governor of Saskatchewan – Reginald John Marsden Parker

==== Premiers ====
- Premier of Alberta – Ernest Manning
- Premier of British Columbia – John Hart (until December 29) then Boss Johnson
- Premier of Manitoba – Stuart Garson
- Premier of New Brunswick – John McNair
- Premier of Nova Scotia – Angus Macdonald
- Premier of Ontario – George A. Drew
- Premier of Prince Edward Island – J. Walter Jones
- Premier of Quebec – Maurice Duplessis
- Premier of Saskatchewan – Tommy Douglas

=== Territorial governments ===
==== Commissioners ====
- Controller then Commissioner of Yukon – George A. Jeckell (until September 18) then John Edward Gibben
- Commissioner of Northwest Territories – Charles Camsell (until January 14) then Hugh Llewellyn Keenleyside

== Events ==
- January 1 - Canadian Citizenship Act 1946 comes into effect. Among other things this changed federal law such that Canadian women no longer lost their citizenship automatically if they married non-Canadians.
- January 2 - Dominion of Newfoundland (later a province in 1949) switches to driving on the right from the left.
- January 27 - The cabinet order deporting Japanese-Canadians to Japan is repealed after widespread protests.
- February 13 - The oil well Leduc No. 1 comes in, launching the Alberta oil industry.
- May 14 - The Chinese Immigration Act of 1923 is repealed.
- June 15 - The laws limiting Asian immigration to Canada are repealed; Canadians of Asian descent are allowed to vote in federal elections.
- July 22 - Two new nuclear reactors go online at the Chalk River research facility.
- September 1 - Two Canadian National Railways (CNR) passenger trains collide head-on at Dugald, Manitoba, resulting in 31 people dead and 85 people injured. The disaster is exacerbated by the CNR's use of wooden passenger coaches, as strict rationing of steel during the Second World War impeded the shift to steel coaches.
- September 30 - The last group of personnel who had been on active service, for World War II, since September 1, 1939, stood down.
- October 1 - New letters patent defining the office and powers of the governor general come into effect.
- December 29 - Boss Johnson becomes premier of British Columbia.
- Stephen Leacock Award: Harry L. Symons, Ojibway Melody.

=== New books ===
- Fearful Symmetry - Northrop Frye
- Who Has Seen the Wind? - W.O. Mitchell

== Sport ==
- April 19 - The Toronto Maple Leafs win their sixth Stanley Cup by defeating the Montreal Canadiens 4 games to 2. The deciding Game 6 was played in Maple Leaf Gardens in Toronto.
- April 22 - The Ontario Hockey Association's Toronto St. Michael's Majors win their third (and last until 1961) Memorial Cup by defeating Southern Saskatchewan Junior Hockey League's Moose Jaw Canucks 4 games to 3. The deciding Game 7 was played at Regina Exhibition Stadium.
- November 29 - The Toronto Argonauts win their eighth Grey Cup by defeating the Winnipeg Blue Bombers 10 to 9 in the 35th Grey Cup played in Varsity Stadium in Toronto. This was the last Grey Cup to be won by a team with all Canadian players.

== Births ==
=== January to March ===
- January 14 - Bill Werbeniuk, snooker player (d. 2003)
- January 15 - Andrea Martin, actress and comedian
- January 23 - Clayton Manness, politician
- January 24 - Steve McCaffery, poet and scholar
- February 10 - Louise Arbour, jurist, justice of the Supreme Court of Canada, former UN High Commissioner for Human Rights
- February 11 - Abby Hoffman, track and field athlete
- February 20 - Joy Smith, politician
- March 1 - Alan Thicke, actor, songwriter and game and talk show host (d. 2016)
- March 10 - Chris Axworthy, politician
- March 10 - Kim Campbell, politician and first female Prime Minister of Canada
- March 24 - Louise Lanctôt, convicted kidnapper and writer

=== April to June ===
- April 3 - Jonathan Welsh, actor (d. 2005)
- April 27 - Pauline Picard, politician (d. 2009)
- May 3 - Doug Henning, magician, illusionist and escape artist (d. 2000)
- May 4 - John Bosley, politician (d. 2022)
- May 7 - Dave Barrow, politician (d. 2022)
- May 12
  - Michael Ignatieff, Canadian politician, philosopher and historian
  - Micheline Lanctôt, Canadian actress, director, and screenwriter
- May 20 - Oscar Lathlin, politician (d. 2008)
- May 25 - Doug Martindale, politician
- May 28 - Lynn Johnston, cartoonist
- June 10 - Michel Bastarache, lawyer, businessman, puisne justice on the Supreme Court of Canada
- June 14
  - Vanessa Harwood, ballet dancer, choreographer, artistic director, teacher and actor
  - Patrick Moore, founder member of Greenpeace
  - Neil Stevens, sports writer (d. 2022)
- June 19 - John Ralston Saul, author and essayist
- June 22 - Aude, writer

=== July to September ===
- July 13 - Rosella Bjornson, airline pilot, first female pilot for a commercial airline in North America
- July 18 - Steve Mahoney, politician and Minister
- July 22
  - Gilles Duceppe, politician
  - Bill Matthews, politician
- July 27 - Serge Bouchard, anthropologist and broadcaster (d. 2021)
- August 8 - Ken Dryden, ice hockey player, politician, lawyer, businessman and author
- August 13 – John Stocker, voice actor
- August 24 - Linda Hutcheon, literary critic and theorist
- August 30 - Allan Rock, politician and diplomat
- September 24
  - Tim Ecclestone, ice hockey player and coach (d. 2024)
  - R. H. Thomson, actor
- September 29 - Hubert Gagnon, actor (d. 2020)

=== October to December ===
- October 3 - Carroll Morgan, boxer (d. 2018)
- October 9 - Wayne Thomas, ice hockey player and executive (d. 2025 in the United States)
- October 13 - Jon Gerrard, politician and medical doctor
- November 10 - Bryan Gibson, boxer
- November 17 - Inky Mark, politician
- November 22 - Jacques Saada, politician and Minister
- November 28 - Bonnie Mitchelson, politician
- December 27 - Mickey Redmond, ice hockey player and commentator
- December 31 - Burton Cummings, musician and songwriter

=== Full date unknown ===
- Bernard Descôteaux, journalist (d. 2024)
- Russ Germain, radio presenter (d. 2009)
- Olga Hrycak, former basketball player and basketball university coach
- John Martin, broadcaster (d. 2006)

== Deaths ==
=== January to June ===
- January 7 - John Alexander Mathieson, jurist, politician and Premier of Prince Edward Island (b. 1863)

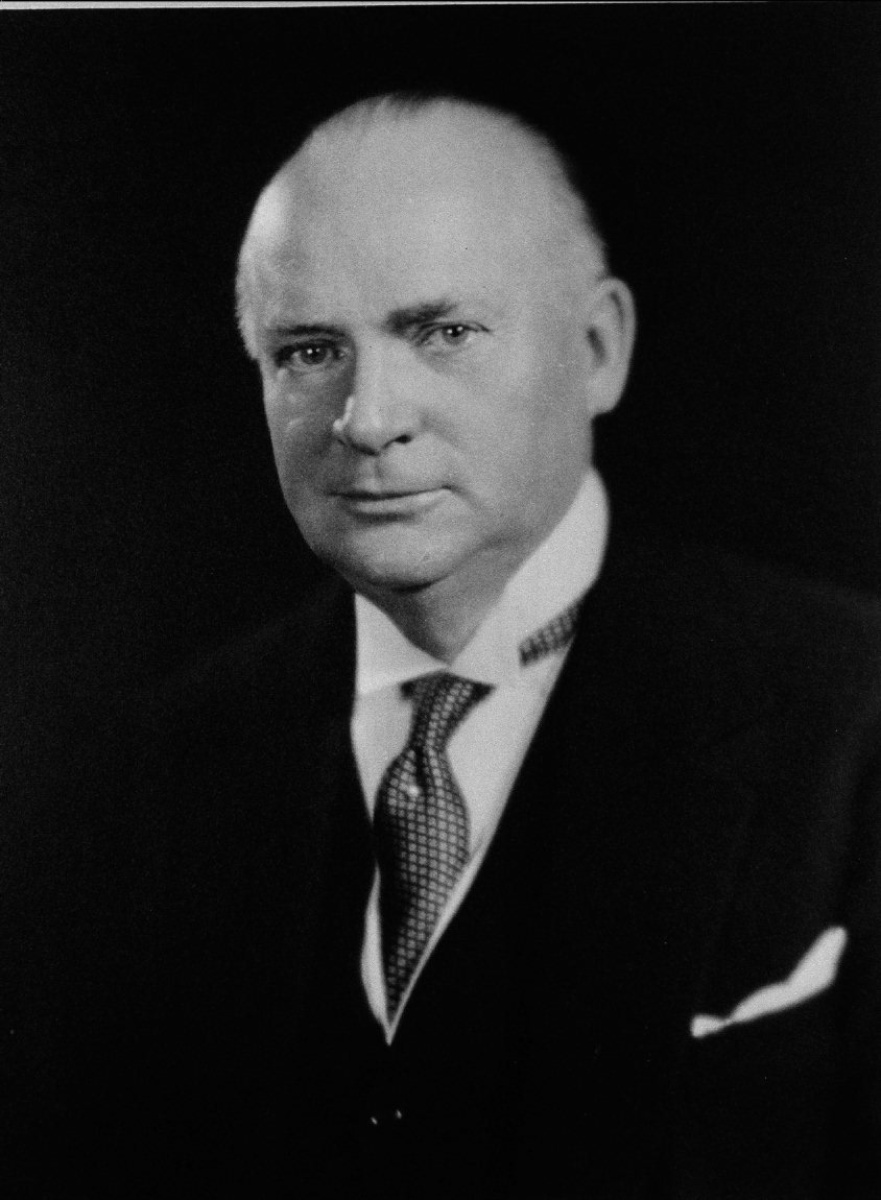
R. B. Bennett

- January 11 - Eva Tanguay, singer and entertainer (b. 1878)
- February 6 – Henry Marshall Tory, university founder (b. 1864)
- March 19 - Prudence Heward, painter (b. 1896)
- June 10 - Alexander Bethune, politician and 12th Mayor of Vancouver (b. 1852)
- June 25 - William Donald Ross, financier, banker and Lieutenant Governor of Ontario (b. 1869)
- June 26 - R. B. Bennett, lawyer, businessman, politician, philanthropist and 11th Prime Minister of Canada (b. 1870)

=== July to December ===
- July 2 - Clarence Lucas, composer, lyricist, conductor and music professor (b. 1866)
- August 11 - Gerry McGeer, politician (b. 1888)
- October 22 – Phoebe Amelia Watson, painter and curator (b. 1858)
- November 14 - Walter Edward Foster, businessman, politician and 16th Premier of New Brunswick (b. 1873)
- December 17 – William Johnston Tupper, politician, 12th Lieutenant Governor of Manitoba (b. 1862)
- December 28 - Leonard Percy de Wolfe Tilley, lawyer, politician and 20th Premier of New Brunswick (b. 1870)

== See also ==
- List of Canadian films
