= 1861 in Canada =

- Decades: 1840s; 1850s; 1860s; 1870s; 1880s
- See also: History of Canada; Timeline of Canadian history; List of years in Canada

Events from the year 1861 in Canada.

== Incumbents ==
- Monarch — Victoria

=== Federal government ===
- Parliament — 6th then 7th

=== Governors ===
- Governor General of the Province of Canada — Edmund Walker Head
- Colonial Governor of Newfoundland — Alexander Bannerman
- Governor of New Brunswick — Arthur Charles Hamilton-Gordon
- Governor of Nova Scotia — George Phipps, 2nd Marquess of Normanby
- Governor of Prince Edward Island — Dominick Daly

=== Premiers ===
- Joint Premiers of the Province of Canada —
  - George-Étienne Cartier, Canada West Premier
  - Antoine-Aimé Dorion, Canada East Premier
- Premier of Newfoundland — Hugh Hoyles
- Premier of New Brunswick — Samuel Leonard Tilley
- Premier of Nova Scotia — James William Johnston
- Premier of Prince Edward Island — Edward Palmer

== Events ==
- April 12 – The American Civil War starts
- April 14 – A major flood hits Montreal
- April 15 – Nova Scotia: resolution for provincial union by Joseph Howe for referral to the other British North American provinces in July.
- May 13 – The UK declares its neutrality in American Civil War.
- June 1 – The UK bans naval craft or privateers of American belligerents from carrying prizes into British ports or territorial waters.
- November 8 – The Trent Affair: British packet steamer Trent stopped by United States warship in international waters. Two Confederate diplomats taken off and imprisoned in Boston.
- November 28 – Viscount Monck becomes Governor-General.
- December 3 – The UK sends reinforcements to British North America.
- December 23 – The UK demands release of Confederate diplomats taken from Trent.
- December 26 – Confederate diplomats taken from Trent released.

=== Full date unknown ===
- Joseph Howe became Premier of Nova Scotia
- Dr. Anderson Ruffin Abbott becomes the first Canadian-born Black to graduate from medical school.
- 1861 Newfoundland general election
- The Cariboo Gold Rush starts in British Columbia.

== Births ==
=== January to June ===
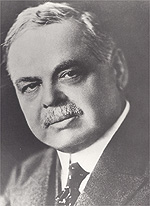
Lomer Gouin

- January 15 – Joseph-Mathias Tellier, politician (died 1952)
- March 10 – Pauline Johnson, poet, writer and performer (died 1913)
- March 10 – Clifford Sifton, politician and Minister (died 1929)
- March 19 – Lomer Gouin, politician and 13th Premier of Quebec (died 1929)
- March 20 – Herménégilde Boulay, politician (died 1942)
- May 13 – Margaret Marshall Saunders, writer
- April 15 – Bliss Carman, poet (died 1929)
- June 7 – George Henry Murray, politician and Premier of Nova Scotia (died 1929)

=== July to December ===
- July 11 – John Best, politician (died 1923)
- September 5 – Tobias Norris, politician and 10th Premier of Manitoba (died 1936)
- September 18 – Ella Cora Hind, journalist and women's rights activist (died 1942)
- September 19 – Charles Ernest Gault, politician (died 1946)
- October 31 – James Bowman, politician (died 1940)
- November 4 – Raoul Dandurand, politician (died 1942)
- November 6 – James Naismith, sports coach and innovator, inventor of basketball (died 1939)
- November 17 – Archibald Lampman, poet (died 1899)
- November 26 – Laura Borden, wife of Robert Borden, 8th Prime Minister of Canada (died 1940)
- December 22 – Sara Jeannette Duncan, author and journalist (died 1922)

== Deaths ==
- February 3 – Louis-Théodore Besserer, notary, soldier, politician, and businessman (born 1785)
- February 13 – Denis-Benjamin Viger, politician, businessman and politician (born 1774)
- November 9 – Howard Douglas, soldier, educator, author, inventor, and colonial administrator (born 1776)
