= 1860 in Canada =

- Decades: 1840s; 1850s; 1860s; 1870s; 1880s
- See also: History of Canada; Timeline of Canadian history; List of years in Canada

Events from the year 1860 in Canada.

== Incumbents ==
- Monarch — Victoria

=== Federal government ===
- Parliament — 6th

=== Governors ===
- Governor General of the Province of Canada — Edmund Walker Head
- Colonial Governor of Newfoundland — Alexander Bannerman
- Governor of New Brunswick — Arthur Charles Hamilton-Gordon
- Governor of Nova Scotia — George Phipps, 2nd Marquess of Normanby
- Governor of Prince Edward Island — Dominick Daly

=== Premiers ===
- Joint Premiers of the Province of Canada —
  - George-Étienne Cartier, Canada West Premier
  - Antoine-Aimé Dorion, Canada East Premier
- Premier of Newfoundland — John Kent
- Premier of New Brunswick — Samuel Leonard Tilley
- Premier of Nova Scotia — James William Johnston
- Premier of Prince Edward Island — Edward Palmer

== Events ==
- February 20 – 205 killed when the SS Hungarian (Allan Line) is wrecked at Cape Sable, Nova Scotia.
- April 26 – The Queen's Own Rifles of Canada formed.
- May 8 – Roman Catholic Diocese of Chatham (later renamed Roman Catholic Diocese of Bathurst (Canada)) erected.
- August 25 – Montreal's Victoria Bridge opens.
- September 1 – In Ottawa, the cornerstone of the Centre Block building is laid by Albert Edward, Prince of Wales, signalling the beginning of the building of the Parliament of Canada buildings.

=== Full date unknown ===
- Chalon head postage stamp issued in New Brunswick
- First ecclesiastical province of the Anglican Church of Canada – Canada – created
- Free Methodist Church in Canada founded
- Two month tour of Canada by Albert Edward, Prince of Wales

== Sport ==
- June 27 – Don Juan won the first Queen's Plate race is held in Toronto.
- Fred Lillywhite's The English Cricketers' Trip to Canada and the United States published, detailing the 1859 Tour of the US and Canada

== Births ==
=== January to June ===
- January 10 – Charles G.D. Roberts, poet and prose writer (died 1943)
- March 7 – Alexander Grant MacKay, teacher, lawyer and politician (died 1920)

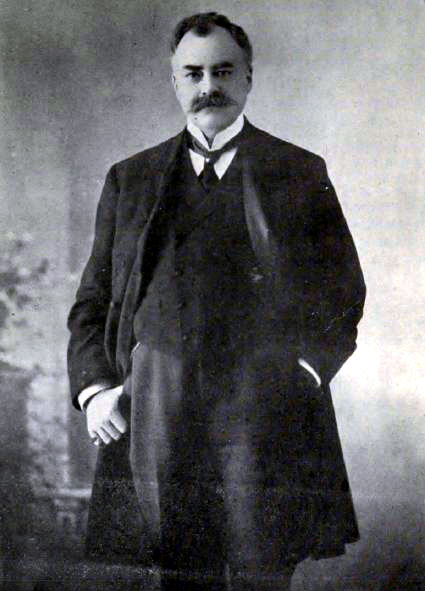
John Douglas Hazen

- May 31 – Henry Wise Wood, politician and president of the United Farmers of Alberta (died 1941)
- June 1 – Margaret Mick, prison guard, first female Canadian peace officer to be killed in the line of duty (died 1925)
- June 5 – John Douglas Hazen, politician and 12th Premier of New Brunswick (died 1937)
- June 18 – Laura Muntz Lyall, painter (died 1930)

=== July to December ===
- July 9 – Frederick Cope, 3rd Mayor of Vancouver (died 1897)
- August 14 – Ernest Thompson Seton, author and wildlife artist (died 1946)
- August 21 – Aylesworth Perry, 6th Commissioner of the Royal Canadian Mounted Police (died 1956)
- August 29 – James Duncan McGregor, agricultural pioneer, politician and Lieutenant-Governor of Manitoba (died 1935)
- September 2 – Georgina Fraser Newhall, author and the bardess of the Clan Fraser Society of Canada (died 1932)
- September 15 – Napoléon Belcourt, politician (died 1932)
- October 14 – John Hampden Burnham, politician and lawyer (died 1940)

=== Full date unknown ===
- Nazaire-Nicolas Olivier, lawyer and politician (died 1898)

== Deaths ==
- January 18 – William Thompson, farmer and political figure (born 1786)
- May 26 – John Willson, judge and political figure (born 1776)
- July 16 – Brenton Halliburton, army officer, lawyer, judge, and politician (born 1774)
- August 10 – Joseph-François Deblois, lawyer, judge and political figure (born 1797)
- September 20 – John McDonald, businessman and political figure (born 1787)
- October 23 – Peter Boyle de Blaquière, political figure and first chancellor of the University of Toronto (born 1783)

=== Full date unknown ===
- A-ca-oo-mah-ca-ye, a chief of the Blackfoot First Nation
