= 1710 in Canada =

- Decades: 1690s; 1700s; 1710s; 1720s; 1730s
- See also: History of Canada; Timeline of Canadian history; List of years in Canada

Events from the year 1710 in Canada.

== Incumbents ==
- French Monarch: Louis XIV
- British and Irish Monarch: Anne

=== Governors ===
- Governor General of New France: Philippe de Rigaud Vaudreuil
- Colonial Governor of Louisiana: Daniel d'Auger de Subercase
- Governor of Nova Scotia: Samuel Vetch
- Governor of Plaisance: Philippe Pastour de Costebelle

== Events ==
- The English recapture Acadia, this time permanently, and rename it Nova Scotia.
- Francis Nicholson captures Port Royal for England.
- The English take Port Royal and name it Annapolis Royal.
- Three Mohawk chiefs and one Mahican are received in Queen Anne's court in England as the Four Kings of the New World.

== Births ==
- October 7 - François-Josué de la Corne Dubreuil, a soldier and trader. (died 1753)
- July 23 - Jonathan Belcher, lawyer, chief justice, and lieutenant governor of Nova Scotia (died 1776)
