= Samuel Street Wilmot =

Loyalist and Upper Canada politician

Samuel Street Wilmot (March 29, 1773 – December 1856) was a surveyor, tanner, farmer and political figure in Upper Canada. He represented Durham in the Legislative Assembly of Upper Canada from 1820 to 1824.

He was born in New York state, the son of Captain Lemuel Wilmot, he came to New Brunswick with his family after the American Revolution. In 1796, Wilmot moved to Upper Canada. He married Mary M. Stegman, daughter of William Stegman of Markham, in 1798. Wilmot lived in Markham Township. In 1809 Wilmont surveyed the first part of Reach Township in what is now Port Perry, Ontario. He served as major in the militia during the War of 1812. Wilmot was a justice of the peace for the Newcastle District. He died in Clarke Township.

His son Samuel later served as reeve for Clarke Township and warden for Durham and Northumberland counties, and went on to be Canadian Superintendent of Fish Culture. His daughter Elizabeth married Asa Allworth Burnham. His brother John McNeil Wilmot was a prominent New Brunswick merchant and his nephews Robert Duncan Wilmot and Lemuel Allan Wilmot were lieutenant-governors for New Brunswick.
