= 1709 in Canada =

- Decades: 1680s; 1690s; 1700s; 1710s; 1720s
- See also: History of Canada; Timeline of Canadian history; List of years in Canada

Events from the year 1709 in Canada.

== Incumbents ==
- French Monarch: Louis XIV
- British and Irish Monarch: Anne

=== Governors ===
- Governor General of New France: Philippe de Rigaud Vaudreuil
- Governor of Acadia: Daniel d'Auger de Subercase
- Colonial Governor of Louisiana: Jean-Baptiste Le Moyne de Bienville
- Governor of Plaisance: Philippe Pastour de Costebelle

== Events ==
- In New France, slavery becomes legal.

== Births ==
- September 7 (O.S. September 18 - Dr. Samuel Johnson born in Lichfield, Staffordshire. (died 1784)
- September 26 - Jean-Louis Le Loutre, priest, Spiritan, and missionary (died 1772)

== Deaths ==
- August - Robert Giguère, pioneer in New France and founder of Sainte-Anne-de-Beaupré (born 1616)
- September 9 - Jean-Baptiste Legardeur de Repentigny (born 1632)
