= Asa Allworth Burnham =

Canadian politician

Asa Allworth Burnham (1808 – May 10, 1873) was an Ontario farmer and political figure. He was a Conservative member of the Senate of Canada from 1867 to 1873.

He was born in Cobourg, Upper Canada in 1808, the son of Asa Burnham who was one of the first settlers in the area. In 1832, Burnham married Elizabeth, the daughter of Samuel Street Wilmot. He served as warden for Northumberland and Durham counties in 1851 and was mayor of Cobourg from 1861 to 1862. Burnham was also a director of the Bank of Toronto. He was elected to the Legislative Assembly of the Province of Canada for Northumberland in 1851. He was elected to the Legislative Council for Newcastle district in 1863 and served until Confederation, when he was named to the Senate.

He died in Ottawa in 1873.

His uncle Zacheus Burnham, who also lived in Cobourg, served in the legislative assembly and council of Upper Canada.
