= 1616 in Quebec =

Events from the year 1616 in Quebec.

== Events ==
- Samuel de Champlain returns to Quebec after having (involuntarily) spent the winter in a Wendat camp. He had been injured in late 1615 in a battle between the Iroquois and a combined French-Wendat force.
- Jean Nicolet is employed by the Companie des Marchants to travel to Quebec. His journey is to be delayed by two years.

== Births ==
- Charles Albanel, Jesuit priest and explorer in New France (died 1696).
- March 9 - Robert Giguère, pioneer in New France and founder of Sainte-Anne-de-Beaupré (died 1709)
