= 1711 in Canada =

- Decades: 1690s; 1700s; 1710s; 1720s; 1730s
- See also: History of Canada; Timeline of Canadian history; List of years in Canada

Events from the year 1711 in Canada.

== Incumbents ==
- French Monarch: Louis XIV
- British and Irish Monarch: Anne

=== Governors ===
- Governor General of New France: Philippe de Rigaud Vaudreuil
- Colonial Governor of Louisiana: Jean-Baptiste Le Moyne de Bienville
- Governor of Nova Scotia: Jean-Baptiste Le Moyne de Bienville
- Governor of Plaisance: Philippe Pastour de Costebelle

== Events ==
- 1711-13 - Tuscarora War on North Carolina frontier fought between British settlers and Tuscarora Indians. Under the English Col. John Barnwell, then Col. James Moore, the Tuscarora Nation was repeatedly attacked, its chiefs tortured, its people sold (10 pounds sterling each) into slavery. The survivors fled northward and settled among the Haudenosee (Iroquois) 5 Nations.

== Births ==
- June 8 – Charles Morris, Canadian judge (d. 1781)
- June 16 – François-Louis de Pourroy de Lauberivière, bishop of Quebec (died 1740), born in Grenoble, France.
- August 19 – Daniel Liénard de Beaujeu, Canadian officer during the Seven Years' War (d. 1755)
