= 1712 in Canada =

- Decades: 1690s; 1700s; 1710s; 1720s; 1730s
- See also: History of Canada; Timeline of Canadian history; List of years in Canada

Events from the year 1712 in Canada.

== Incumbents ==
- French Monarch: Louis XIV
- British and Irish Monarch: Anne

=== Governors ===
- Governor General of New France: Philippe de Rigaud Vaudreuil
- Colonial Governor of Louisiana: Jean-Baptiste Le Moyne de Bienville
- Governor of Nova Scotia: Samuel Vetch then Francis Nicholson
- Governor of Plaisance: Philippe Pastour de Costebelle

== Events ==
- 1712-34 - Fox resistance against the French in the Great Lakes area. Fox Wars begin.
