= David Bazay =

Canadian journalist

David J. Bazay (July 12, 1939 – October 30, 2005) was a Canadian journalist for the CBC and later the English language ombudsman. He was scheduled to retire in November 2005 and was succeeded upon his death by Vincent A. Carlin.

He was born in Winnipeg, Manitoba in 1939 and grew up in Elma, Manitoba. Bazay joined the CBC in 1972 as a TV producer in Montreal, Quebec and Vancouver, British Columbia. He became the CBC's Paris correspondent and national correspondent in Quebec. In 1993 he became Chief Editor of the CBC English language news. He became the English network's ombudsman in 1995.

A married father of two, Bazay died in Toronto of undetermined causes on October 30, 2005.
