= Michel Bénard =

Canadian councillor

Michel Bénard (c. 1713 – ?) was a councillor of the Conseil Supérieur of New France.

From 1736 to 1748, Bénard was first secretary to the Intendant of New France, Gilles Hocquart. In 1757 he was made a regular councillor of the Sovereign Council, an office he held until the Conquest.
