= 1862 in Canada =

- Decades: 1840s; 1850s; 1860s; 1870s; 1880s
- See also: History of Canada; Timeline of Canadian history; List of years in Canada

Events from the year 1862 in Canada.

== Incumbents ==
- Monarch — Victoria

=== Federal government ===
- Parliament — 7th

=== Governors ===
- Governor General of the Province of Canada — Viscount Monck
- Colonial Governor of Newfoundland — Alexander Bannerman
- Governor of New Brunswick — Arthur Charles Hamilton-Gordon
- Governor of Nova Scotia — George Phipps, 2nd Marquess of Normanby
- Governor of Prince Edward Island — George Dundas

=== Premiers ===
- Joint Premiers of the Province of Canada –
  - John A. Macdonald, Canada West Premier (until May 24)
  - George-Étienne Cartier, Canada East Premier (until May 24)
  - John Sandfield MacDonald, Canada West Premier
  - Louis-Victor Sicotte, Canada East Premier
- Premier of Newfoundland — Hugh Hoyles
- Premier of New Brunswick — Samuel Leonard Tilley
- Premier of Nova Scotia – Joseph Howe
- Premier of Prince Edward Island – Edward Palmer

== Events ==
- April 7 – United Kingdom-United States treaty for suppression of African slave trade is signed.
- May 20 – Macdonald-Cartier government falls. Free interprovincial trade granted by the Crown.
- August 2 – Victoria, British Columbia, is incorporated as a city

=== Full date unknown ===
- The first female student is accepted into Mount Allison University in Sackville, New Brunswick
- The 1862 Pacific Northwest smallpox epidemic sweeps through Fort Victoria area and up the length of the northwest coast, killing an estimated 20,000 First Nations people
- William Duncan, an Anglican missionary on the northwest coast, establishes the village of Metlakatla with 50 Tsimshian followers, who adopt the Christian faith and a European lifestyle. By 1880, more than 1,000 converts live there.
- Construction begins on the Cariboo Wagon Road to link coastal shipping to Barkerville and the Cariboo goldfields.

== Births ==
- January 9 – Joseph-Octave Samson, businessperson, politician and 28th Mayor of Quebec City (died 1945
- June 29 – William Johnston Tupper, politician, 12th Lieutenant Governor of Manitoba (died 1947)
- July 8 – Josephine White Bates, Canadian-born American author (died 1934)

== Deaths ==
- August 8 – Allan MacNab, businessman, soldier, lawyer and politician (born 1798)
- August 18 – Simon Fraser, fur-trader and explorer (born 1776)
