= Frederick Francis Mathers =

Canadian politician

The Honourable Frederick Francis Mathers

18th Lieutenant Governor of Nova Scotia
- In office May 31, 1940 – June 29, 1942
- Monarch: George VI
- Governor General: The Earl of Athlone
- Premier: Angus Lewis Macdonald; A. S. MacMillan
- Preceded by: Robert Irwin
- Succeeded by: Henry Ernest Kendall

Personal details
- Born: October 17, 1871 Saint John, New Brunswick
- Died: June 29, 1947 (aged 75) Halifax, Nova Scotia
- Spouse: Margaret Ethel Bligh (m. 1899)
- Education: Dalhousie Law School; Harvard Law School
- Occupation: Lawyer
- Profession: Politician, Soldier

Frederick Francis Mathers (October 17, 1871 – June 29, 1947) was the 18th Lieutenant Governor of Nova Scotia from May 31, 1940, to November 17, 1942.

He was born in Saint John, New Brunswick, the son of Isaac Henry Mathers and Kathleen McDonnell, and was educated in Halifax, at Dalhousie Law School and Harvard Law School. In 1899, Mathers married Margaret Ethel Bligh. He was deputy provincial secretary from 1902 to 1918 and deputy attorney general from 1918 to 1940. He served in the "Scottish Rifles" Company in the First World War and as Honorary Colonel of the Rifles from 1942 until 1947.
