= Edmund Walker Head =

British governor in British North America

The Right Honourable Sir Edmund Walker Head Bt, KCB
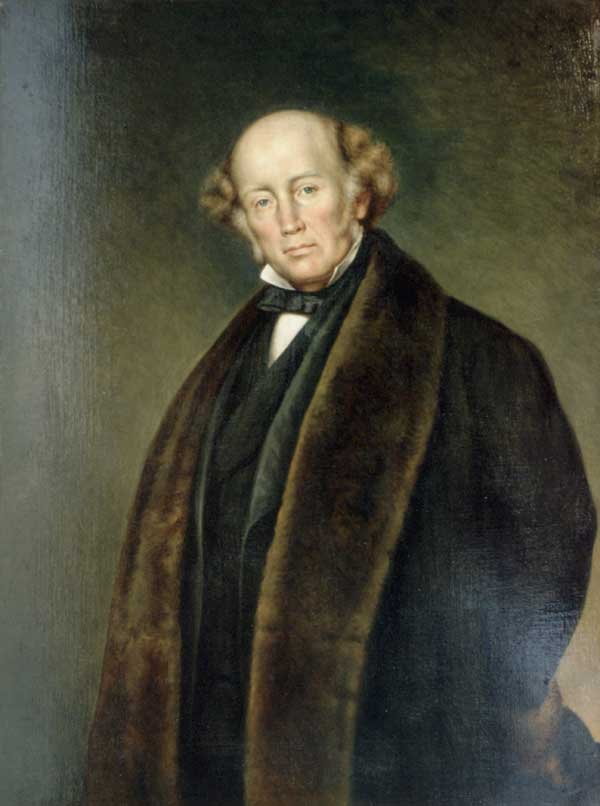
- George Theodore Berthon's Sir Edmund Walker Head, 8th Baronet

Lieutenant Governor of New Brunswick
- In office 1848–1854
- Monarch: Victoria
- Preceded by: William MacBean George Colebrooke
- Succeeded by: John Manners-Sutton, 3rd Viscount Canterbury

Governor General of the Province of Canada
- In office 1854–1861
- Monarch: Victoria
- Preceded by: James Bruce, 8th Earl of Elgin
- Succeeded by: Charles Monck, 4th Viscount Monck

Personal details
- Born: 16 February 1805 Wiarton Place, near Maidstone, England
- Died: 28 January 1868 (aged 62) London, England
- Spouse: Lady Anna Maria Head (née Yorke)

Sir Edmund Walker Head, 8th Baronet, KCB (16 February 1805 – 28 January 1868) was a 19th-century British politician and diplomat.

== Early life and scholarship ==
Head was born at Wiarton Place, near Maidstone, Kent, the son of the Reverend Sir John Head, 7th Bt. and Jane (née Walker) Head. He succeeded to his father's title in 1838.

He was educated at Winchester College and Oriel College, Oxford, and in 1830 he was made a Fellow of Merton College. He was an Oxford scholar and tutor who published several books, including a book on the verbs shall and will. In 1866, Head published The Story of Viga Glum, which he had translated from the original Icelandic. He was elected a Fellow of the Royal Society in 1863.

== Government service ==
In 1847, Head was appointed Lieutenant Governor of New Brunswick (1847–1854).

While Lieutenant Governor, Head authorized the creation of an engineering faculty at the University of New Brunswick (UNB). This was the first such programme in what would become Canada.

In 1854, Head was appointed Governor General of the Province of Canada. He served until 1861. During his time in office, there was some controversy over his refusal to grant a dissolution to the Reform ministry at the time of the "Double Shuffle".

He was appointed a Privy Councillor in 1857, and Knight Commander of the Order of the Bath in 1860.

Head died in London in 1868.

== Family ==
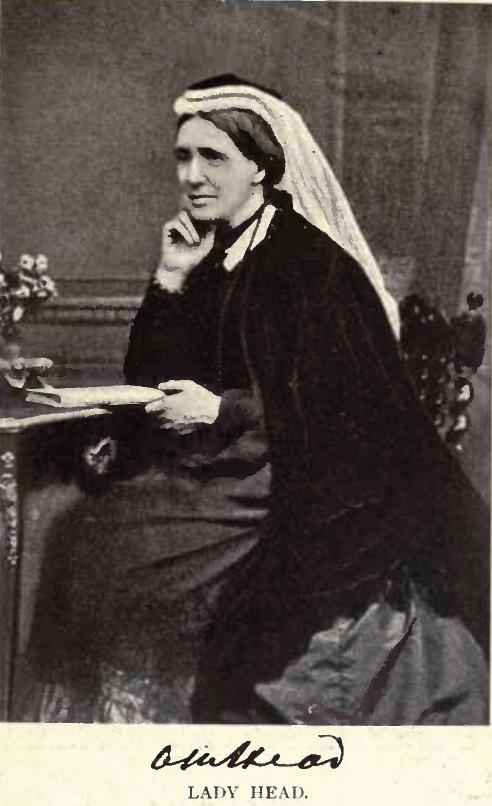
Lady Anna Maria Head (née Yorke)

He had married Anna Maria Yorke, daughter of Reverend Philip Yorke Prebendary of Ely, and his wife, Hon. Anna Maria Cocks, daughter of John Cocks, 1st Earl Somers, on 27 November 1838. Anna Maria was born in 1808. The couple had three children. Their son accidentally drowned in Quebec's Saint-Maurice River in September 1859. One of their two daughters was born at Fredericton, New Brunswick on 6 February 1849.

Anna Maria was an artist, who sketched a picture of the view from Major's Hill, Ottawa, Ontario which she subsequently presented to Queen Victoria. Within a month or two after this event Her Majesty chose Ottawa as the seat of Government of United Canada. Lady Head volunteered and bestowed alms among the poor. A memorial of her Ladyship's visit to the Upper Ottawa, in a bark canoe, in 1856, stands at Portage-du-Fort, Quebec. In the county of Renfrew, a township Maria, was named in her honour. Lady Head died at Oak Lea, Shere, Guildford, England, 25 August 1890.

== Legacy ==
- Sir Edmund Head Hall is the name of the engineering building at the University of New Brunswick.
- Edmundston, New Brunswick, is named after him.
- The united township of Head, Clara and Maria in Renfrew County, Ontario was named in honour of Head and his wife.
- Mount Head in the Canadian Rockies of Alberta is named after him.

== See also ==
- List of lieutenant governors of New Brunswick
- List of governors general of the Province of Canada

Baronetage of England
Preceded by John Head	Baronet (of The Hermitage); 1838–1868	Extinct
