= William George Clark (politician) =

Canadian politician

The Honourable William George Clark

19th Lieutenant Governor of New Brunswick
- In office March 5, 1940 – November 1, 1945
- Monarch: George VI
- Governor General: The Earl of Athlone
- Premier: Allison Dysart; John B. McNair
- Preceded by: Murray MacLaren
- Succeeded by: David Laurence MacLaren

Personal details
- Born: October 1, 1865 Queensbury, New Brunswick
- Died: January 18, 1948 (aged 82) Fredericton, New Brunswick, Canada
- Party: Liberal
- Education: University of New Brunswick
- Occupation: Merchant
- Profession: Politician

William George Clark (October 1, 1865 – January 18, 1948) was a merchant and political figure in New Brunswick, Canada. He represented York—Sunbury in the House of Commons of Canada from 1935 to 1940 as a Liberal member. Clark was the 19th Lieutenant Governor of New Brunswick from 1940 to 1945.

He was born in Queensbury, New Brunswick. Clark served as a town councillor for Fredericton Town Council from 1917 to 1925 and was mayor from 1925 to 1935.

Father of historian Esther Clark Wright.

1935 Canadian federal election: Fredericton
Party	Candidate	Votes	%	±%
Liberal	William George Clark	9,296	46.85	+15.92
Conservative	Richard Hanson	9,042	45.57	-23.50
Reconstruction	Errol MacDonald	1,506	7.59	Ø
Total valid votes		19,844	100.00	
