= George A. Jeckell =

George Allen Jeckell (July 25, 1880 – May 30, 1950) was an educator, civil servant and political figure in the Yukon, Canada. He served as the comptroller of Yukon from 1932 to 1946 and was accordingly the highest ranked government official in the territory.

He was born in Exeter, Ontario, the son of William Jeckell and Essy Case, and was educated in Exeter, Goderich and at normal schools in the Northwest Territories and Yukon. In 1933, he married his second wife, Anna Theresa Boyle. Jeckell was a teacher in Dawson and become a revenue inspector for the Department of National Revenue in 1928. He was a prominent freemason.
