= Larry Bourne =

Canadian geographer

Larry Stuart Bourne (born December 24, 1939) is a Canadian academic geographer. He has been called a "leading expert on Canadian urban issues." Bourne's academic career has been based in geography/planning at the University of Toronto with interest primarily in North American cities.

== Background ==
Bourne was born in London, Ontario. He obtained a B.A. (Hons.) in geography from the University of Western Ontario, in 1961; his thesis title was "A Study in Port Geography: Port Burwell, Ont." He earned an M.A. in Settlement Geography from University of Alberta in 1963 with a thesis entitled "Yellowknife: Its Urban and Regional Economy." In 1966 the University of Chicago awarded him a Ph.D. in urban geography; his thesis title was "Private Redevelopment of the Central City."

Since 1966 Bourne has been associated with the University of Toronto, first as a lecturer, then assistant professor (1966–1969) and associate professor (1969–1973). He became a full professor in 1973. He is currently professor emeritus of urban geography and planning and past director (1996–1998) of the graduate program in planning at the University of Toronto. He also served as director of the University of Toronto's Centre for Urban and Community Studies (1973–1984) and later of the Cities Centre (2007–2008). He currently has continuing appointments as research affiliated faculty with the Global Cities Institute and the School of Cities at the University of Toronto.

His primary research interests are concerned with urban growth dynamics, urban decline, the evolving form and structure of cities in Canada, and the changing nature of inequalities within cities.

He has over 287 associated publications on record at Library and Archives Canada, and is the author or editor of some 20 books and over 250 academic articles, book chapters and professional reports.

Bourne is also an expert researcher for The Neptis Foundation. He served as president of the Canadian Association of Geographers from 1993 to 1994, and as president of the North American Regional Science Council from 1994 and 1995. He contributed to the International Geographical Union's Urban Commission continuously since 1980, served as chair from 1984 to 1992 and from 2000 has been an honorary member of the executive committee.

He has been featured on CBC News as an expert on city planning. Bourne is frequently interviewed by the media on issues of current interest related to his areas of expertise including mixed-use building, intensification, social geography and inequality. The Saint John, New Brunswick, Telegraph-Herald reports that "Bourne's expertise has been sought by all levels of government, community organizations and several national and international agencies".

Bourne was profiled in Canadian Geographic (2004) and his work is widely referenced by other authors in his field.

== Honours and awards ==
Bourne is a Fellow of the Royal Society of Canada (RSC), the Royal Canadian Geographical Society (RCGS) and the Canadian Institute of Planners (CIP), and is a continuing member of the Urban Commission of the International Geographical Union (IGU).

In 2012 Bourne was awarded the International Geographical Union's highest honour, the Lauréat d’honneur. This award honours individuals who have achieved particular distinction or who have rendered outstanding service in the work of the IGU or in international geography and environmental research.

The Canadian Institute of Planners named him a Fellow in 2012. Simcoe Chapter, Lambda Alpha International, chose Bourne as the recipient of their President's Award of Recognition in 2008.

He was awarded the honorary degree of D.Litt. by the University of New Brunswick, Saint John, in 2008.

He received the Massey Medal of the Royal Canadian Geographic Society in 2004 with the citation: "Bourne’s contributions to urban-policy debates extend beyond local and national issues. His expertise has been sought by such groups as The World Bank, the International Joint Commission and the Organisation for Economic Co-operation and Development."

The University of Waterloo bestowed upon Bourne the honorary degree of Doctor of Environmental Studies (DES) in 1999. The American Association of Geographers (AAG) awarded Bourne honours in 1985. The Canadian Association of Geographers honoured him with their 1985 Award For Scholarly Distinction In Geography.

Bourne received an Outstanding Teaching Award from the University of Toronto in 1998.

== Selected invited lectures and papers ==
"City Building: Beyond the Concrete," Cities Centre, invited lecture for "Toronto in Question" public lecture series, 2011.

"Understanding Change in Cities: A Personal Research Path," (Invited contribution) The Canadian Geographer, 51, 2, 2007, 121–138.

"Are Canadian Cities becoming more Socially Polarized?" Convocation Address, University of New Brunswick, Saint John, New Brunswick, 2009.

Special Bourneschrift Sessions: Urban Research Spanning Five Decades, 1965-2005, Canadian Association of Geographers (CAG) Meetings, London, Ont., May 2005.

"Canadian Cities in Transition: New Sources of Urban Difference." Invited paper presented to the Meetings of the Commission on Monitoring Cities of the International Geographical Union, Ljubljana, Slovenia, August, 2004.

"Beyond the New Deal for Cities: Confronting the Challenges of Uneven Urban Growth." Invited presentation to the Conference On Challenging Cities, McGill Institute for the Study of Canada, Montreal, February 13, 2004.

"On the State of Urban Geography: A Personal Perspective." Invited presentation to a Special Panel on Urban Geography, at Meetings of the Association of American Geographers, Philadelphia, PA, March 14, 2004.

"The Transformation of the Canadian Urban System in a Changing Global Context: New Continental Divides?" Invited presentation to Special Conference on the opening of the Canadian Universities Study Centre, Berlin, Germany, May 26, 2003.

"Urban Issues and Urban Governance in Canada." Invited presentation to the Association of Canadian Studies, Annual Conference, Montreal, January 24, 2003.

"Urban Geography in Transition: A Canadian Perspective on the 1980s." Invited paper for Special Session on Urban Geography in the 1980s, Meetings of the Association of American Geographers, New Orleans, Mar. 6, 2003.

"The Contributions of Social Change to Transportation Policy and Planning." Invited as Presenter and Moderator, Knowledge Symposium, Ministry of Transportation of Ontario, Mississauga, Oct. 9, 2002.

Invited keynote address, Nordic Association of Canadian Studies, Stockholm, Sweden, August 2002.

"The Changing Macro-Geography of Urbanization: An Urban System Perspective." Invited paper presentated to International Union for the Scientific Study of Population (IUSSP), Rockefeller Centre, Bellagio, Italy, March 11–15, 2002.

"The Canadian Urban System: Old Structures, New Dynamics." Invited paper presented to International Geographical Union, Urban Commission, Calgary, Aug. 3, 2001.

"Alternative Models for Managing Metropolitan Regions: The Challenge for North American Cities." Invited paper presented to International Forum on Metropolization, Santa Cruz, Bolivia, March 11, 1999.

"Designing an Urban Region: The Lessons Learned and Lost Opportunities of the Toronto Experience." Invited paper for World Bank seminar on Urban and City Management, Toronto, May 1999.

Annual H. Roepke Lecture in Economic Geography, Association of American Geographers (AAG) Meetings, Miami, April 1991. Entitled "Recycling Urban Systems and Metropolitan Areas: A Geographical Agenda for the 1990s and Beyond," the lecture text was published in Economic Geography.
