= Marc-André =

Marc-André is a French masculine given name, common in Canada. It is a compound name, composed of Marc and André. Notable people with this name include:

- Marc-André Bergeron (born 1980), Canadian ice hockey defenceman
- Marc-André Bergeron (taekwondo) (born 1991), Canadian taekwondo practitioner
- Marc-André Blanchard (born 1965), Canadian lawyer and diplomat
- Marc-André Bourdon (born 1989), Canadian ice hockey defenceman
- Marc-André Bédard (disambiguation), multiple people, including:
  - Marc-André Bédard (biathlete) (born 1986), Canadian biathlete
  - Marc-André Bédard (politician) (1935–2020), Canadian attorney and politician
- Marc-André Bernier, Canadian underwater archaeologist
- Marc-André Cliche (born 1987), Canadian ice hockey centre
- Marc-André Craig (born 1982), Canadian figure skater
- Marc-André Dalbavie (born 1961), French composer
- Marc-André Dorion (born 1987), Canadian ice hockey defenceman
- Marc-André Fleury (born 1984), Canadian ice hockey goaltender
- Marc-André Gadoury, Canadian city councillor
- Marc-André Gragnani (born 1987), Canadian ice hockey defenceman
- Marc-André Grondin (born 1984), Canadian actor
- Marc-André Hamelin (born 1961), Canadian virtuoso pianist and composer
- Marc-André Leclerc (1992–2018), Canadian rock climber and alpinist from British Columbia
- Marc-André Kruska (born 1987), German football midfielder
- Marc-André Moreau (born 1982), Canadian freestyle skier
- Marc-André Morin (born 1951), Canadian politician from Quebec
- Marc-André Raffalovich (1864–1934), French poet and writer
- Marc-André Royer (born 1992),Canadian Drum teacher born in Québec
- Marc-André Servant (born 1991), Canadian competitive ice dancer
- Marc-André ter Stegen (born 1992), German football goalkeeper
- Marc-André Thinel (born 1981), Canadian ice hockey winger
