= Indigenous Peoples Atlas of Canada =

Canadian educational resource

- Cover of the volume Truth and Reconciliation, one of four books in the Atlas
- Language: English, French
- Subject: Indigenous peoples in Canada
- Genre: Encyclopedia
- Publisher: Canadian Geographic
- Publication date: 2018
- Publication place: Canada
- Website: Official website

The Indigenous Peoples Atlas of Canada (French: Atlas des peuples autochthones du Canada) is an English and French educational resource created by the Royal Canadian Geographical Society, published by Canadian Geographic, and funded by the Government of Canada. It was created to address calls to action from the Truth and Reconciliation Commission, among them the development of "culturally appropriate curricula" for Aboriginal Canadian students. Its content includes information about indigenous lands, languages, communities, treaties, and cultures, and topics such as the Canadian Indian residential school system, racism, and cultural appropriation.

== Description ==
The Atlas consists of a four-volume book set, an interactive website, five floor maps, downloadable tile maps, plastic-coated maps, poster maps, teaching guides for elementary and secondary school students, and lesson plans for teachers. One floor map is the size of a school gymnasium, about 11 by 8 metres (36 ft × 26 ft). The periphery of the map contains a timeline of indigenous events from about 2000 BCE to 2017.

To create the Atlas, editors collaborated with a number of groups and organizations representing indigenous peoples in Canada, including the Assembly of First Nations, Indspire, Inuit Tapiriit Kanatami, the Métis National Council, and the National Centre for Truth and Reconciliation. Some of the editors are members of an indigenous group.

The four books comprising the encyclopedia are: Inuit, about the Inuit; Métis, about the Métis; First Nations, about the First Nations; and Truth and Reconciliation, about residential schools, redress, and litigation. The latter volume also includes numerous maps.

The visual design was created by Vincent Design of Winnipeg, founded by Métis designer Shaun Vincent. The logo is a compass-shaped circular graphic representing guidance and incorporating themes from aboriginal groups throughout Canada, such as a medicine wheel.

== History ==
It was unveiled in Ottawa on June 21, 2018 by John G. Geiger, the chief executive officer of Royal Canadian Geographical Society, Mélanie Joly, the Minister of Canadian Heritage, Nellie Kusugak, Commissioner of Nunavut, and leaders representing First Nations, Inuit and the Métis Nation, as well as Indigenous artists. A subsequent launch was held in Toronto in August 2018 by Royal Canadian Geographical Society chief operating officer Gilles Gagnier, Kids Can Press president Lisa Lyons Johnston, leaders of the Mississaugas of the New Credit First Nation, and some of the editors who contributed to the atlas.

The project began in 2016 with a meeting between Geiger and Carolyn Bennett, the Minister of Crown–Indigenous Relations of the Cabinet of Canada. In June 2017, Joly announced that the Government of Canada would provide $2,084,000 in funding to the Royal Canadian Geographical Society to develop the educational resource, a portion of which was drawn from the Canada 150 fund. An issue of each of Canadian Geographic and Géographica were dedicated to the project.

The book set will be sold and distributed by Kids Can Press.

Geiger has stated that the atlas and maps will be translated into a number of the indigenous languages of Canada.

== See also ==
- Indigenous peoples of the Americas
