= Ella Manning =

Nurse, Arctic explorer, writer and naturalist

- Born: Ella Wallace Jackson; October 26, 1906; Shubenacadie, Nova Scotia, Canada
- Died: September 25, 2007 (aged 100); Ottawa, Ontario, Canada
- Other name: Mrs. Tom Manning
- Education: Teachers College; Dalhousie University; School of Nursing, Royal Victoria Hospital
- Occupations: Nurse; Teacher; Writer; Explorer; Naturalist
- Notable work: Igloo for the Night; A Summer on Hudson Bay
- Spouse: Thomas Henry Manning

Ella Manning (née Ella Wallace Jackson, 26 October 1906 – 25 September 2007) was a Canadian nurse, Arctic explorer, writer and naturalist. She is known for her autobiographical books describing her experiences in the Canadian Arctic on scientific expeditions charting remote areas of Baffin Island.

== Early life and education ==
Manning was born in Mill Village, near Shubenacadie, Nova Scotia to Frederick and Rachael Aida (née Wallace) Jackson and grew up on a farm. She attended Teachers College and then Dalhousie University, graduating in 1930 with a BA in History and Latin. In 1933, she finished training as a nurse at the Royal Victoria Hospital in Montreal.

== Career ==
In 1938, Manning accepted a proposal of marriage from Thomas Henry Manning and went to join him in Cape Dorset. She travelled on the Nascopie to meet him and join in his work surveying the Arctic and studying local flora and fauna. The two travelled by boat to remote areas, and made camp on land for the winter. They used dogsleds to explore the surrounding area. Manning learned to craft warm clothes and live independently in the Arctic without relying on local guides. During her time in the Arctic, Manning also helped to collect botanical samples with Dr. Nicholas Polunin. She returned to Ottawa during the Second World War.

Manning wrote about her experiences in the far north, with two books entitled Igloo for the Night and A Summer on Hudson Bay as well as an article describing the traditional garments worn in the area. Her contributions were often signed "Mrs. Tom Manning", leading to confusion in later attribution. She is credited as "Ella Wallace Manning", "Jackie Manning", or "Jacquie Manning".

In 1947, Manning, her husband, and their friends Graham and Diana Rowley formed a club called The Arctic Circle to promote discussion of issues surrounding research and development in the Arctic. Manning delivered a talk at the 14th meeting of the club in 1949 on the topic of "Travels in Hudson Bay and Foxe Basin" and remained part of the committee during the ensuing decade, as documented in The Arctic Circular published by the club. The organisation still exists.

== Personal life ==
Manning often went by nicknames including Jenny, Jackie, Jacquie or Jack.

In approximately 1935, she briefly met Thomas Henry Manning. She received a telegram from him in 1938, inviting her to leave her post in Montreal and join him exploring the Arctic. They were married upon her arrival. They separated amicably in the 1960s though they were never divorced.

== Legacy ==
A fund in her name was established through the Ottawa Community Foundation. She left gifts to the Shepherds of Good Hope Foundation in Ottawa.

Manning's books have been used as a basis for studying gender and marriage dynamics in Arctic exploration.
