= The Arctic Circle =

Informal group in Ottawa

The Arctic Circle is an informal club in Ottawa that has been connecting people with an interest in the Arctic. In 2014, the club celebrated its 500th meeting.

== Background ==
An informal group, the Arctic Circle began in 1947 when Tom and Jackie Manning invited their friends Graham and Diana Rowley for dinner. After a quick round of organizing, the club was formed. The Arctic Circle had its first meeting on December 8, 1947.

== Achievements ==
Over five hundred meetings have been held, with presentations by some of the foremost Arctic experts. Subjects run the gamut from northern history and archeology, geology, botany, ecology, society and culture, exploration, fine arts, transportation, astronomy, economics, medicine, etc. The 500th meeting was celebrated on April 8, 2014.

From 1948 to 1984, the Arctic Circle published a newsletter called the Arctic Circular. Diana Rowley has served as the editor.
