= Bellerby & Co, Globemakers =

UK manufacturer of artisanal globes

Coordinates: 51.5625°N 0.0785°W

Bellerby & Co. Limited
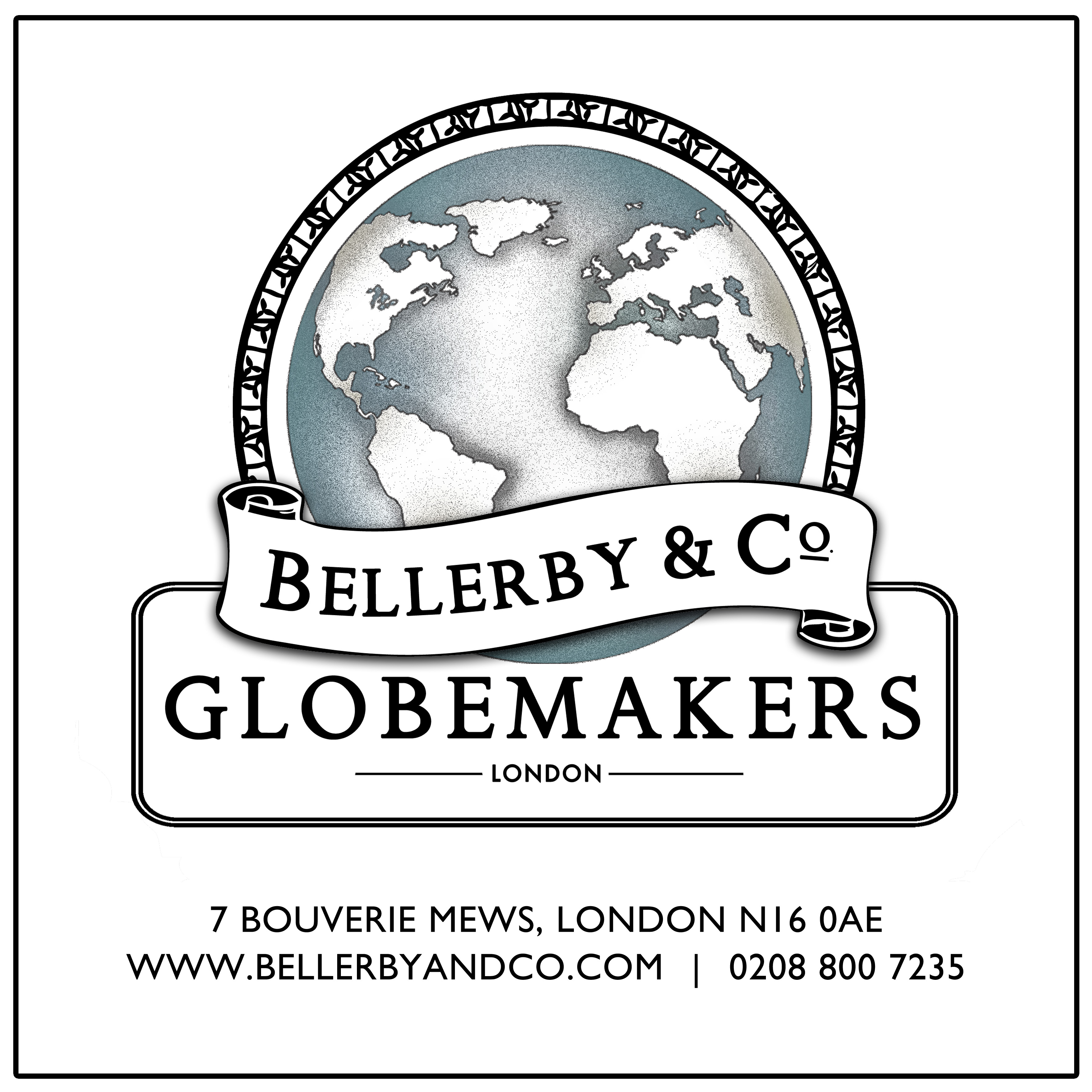

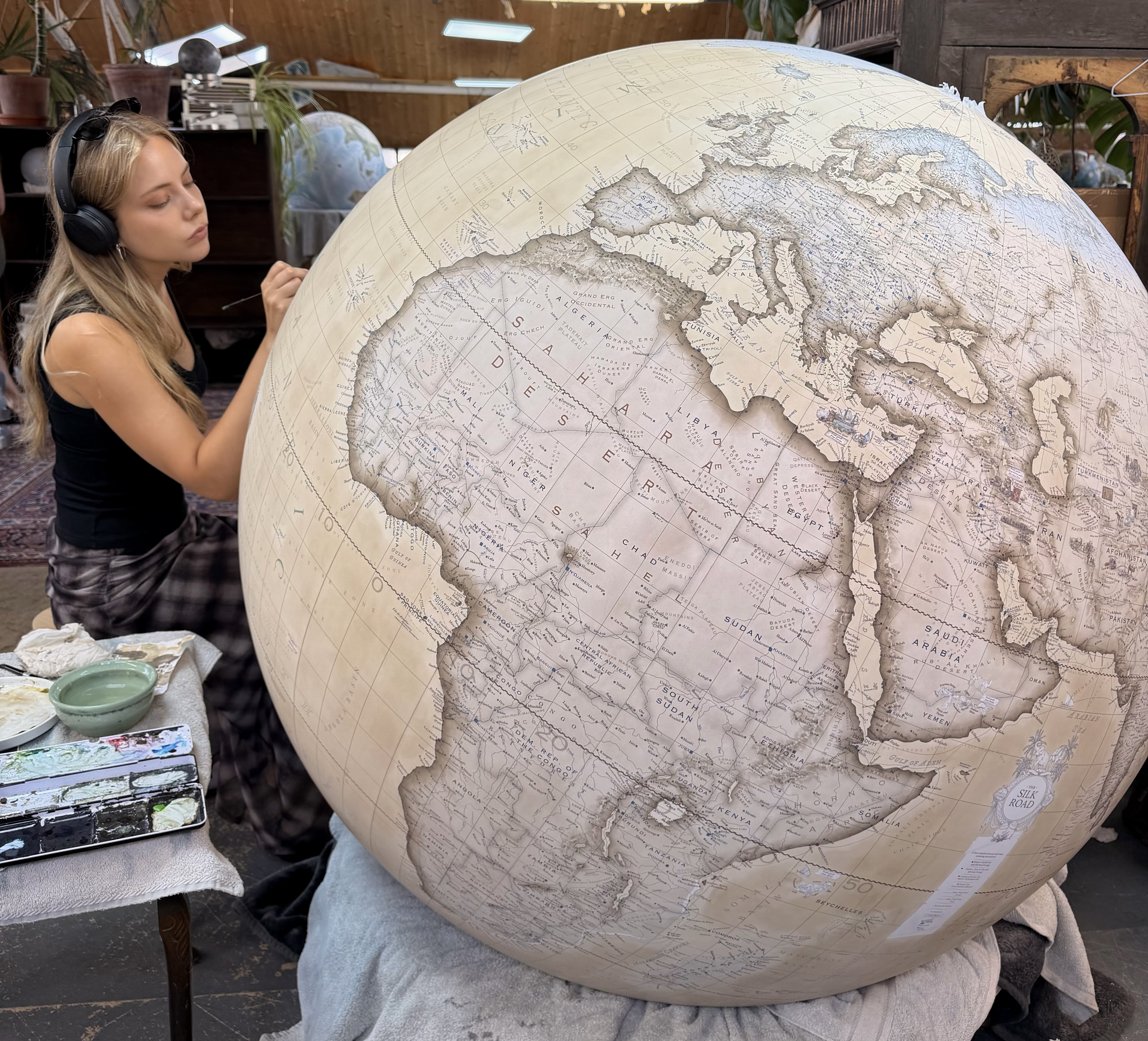
- A Bellerby & Co Globe being painted
- Trade name: Bellerby & Co, Globemakers
- Type: Ltd
- Industry: Bespoke globemakers
- Founded: 2008
- Founder: Peter Bellerby
- Headquarters: London, N16 0AE, England, UK
- Products: Globes
- Number of employees: 25 (2021)
- Website: bellerbyandco.com

Bellerby & Co. Limited, trading as Bellerby & Co, Globemakers, is a privately owned English company based in Stoke Newington, North London, specialising in the manufacture of artisanal handcrafted globes.

== History ==
After a career in television, Peter Bellerby was running a music venue in London that included a bowling alley, when he started a search for a special globe for his father's 80th birthday. Not finding what he wanted, he set about making a globe himself by hand which led to the founding of the company in 2008.

Two globes were commissioned for the 2011 film Hugo. In 2012, the company hosted the first globe exhibition at The Royal Geographical Society, and in the same year, an egg-shaped Bellerby globe was donated to The Faberge Big Egg Hunt charity for auction in London to raise funds for the Elephant Family conservation movement. A second "egg" globe was auctioned at Sotheby's in New York in 2014 and raised $25,000, for both Elephant Family and Action for Children.

The company has collaborated with British-Nigerian artist Yinka Shonibare, for example on a "globe head" for his ballerina statue for the Royal Opera House.

In 2017 the company made about 500 globes, including a commissioned globe that illustrates Royal Ascot's 300-year heritage.

In 2018 the company received a Queen's Award for Enterprise in the international trade category. It also took part in the Homo Faber exhibition, collaborated with artist George Butler in an exhibition at the Bankside Gallery, and was commissioned by the family of Reinhold Würth to create a Churchill Globe for his 83rd birthday. The globe displays places and events which played an important role in his life.

In 2021 the company received a second Queen's Award for Enterprise in the international trade category. They also collaborated with British brand DAKS on a line of silk scarves, and with jewellery designers Hirsh on a small collection of illustrated desktop globes.

Bloomsbury Publishing commissioned a book about the company which was released in 2023. The book covers not only Bellerby's own journey to becoming a globemaker, but the roots of the craft itself, from the ancients Greeks and their predecessors who first discovered the Earth was a sphere, all the way through to Martin Behaim's Erdapfel, the world's oldest surviving terrestrial globe created in Nuremberg between 1492 and 1494 and beyond to the Renaissance periods of the 17th and 18th centuries when globemaking was at its zenith.

In 2023 The Royal Canadian Geographical Society in Ottawa, Canada commissioned a large fifty inch diameter floor standing globe for their Centre for Geography and Exploration, it was unveiled in 2025 with Stephen Harper, 22nd Prime Minister of Canada attending.

In 2025, the nonprofit National Geographic Society commissioned the studio to produce what would be its largest-ever handmade globe for the lobby of the Society's new museum. The 152cm (60 inch) globe highlights the world’s natural features and adheres to the strict standards of the Society’s cartography department. You can see the globe handcrafted by Bellerby & Co, Globemakers at the National Geographic Museum of Exploration in Washington, DC. which opened June 26, 2026.

== Globemaking ==
Originally made from hemispheres of plaster of Paris glued together, the company's small globes are now made from resin and the larger from composite materials. The company employs three cartographers and uses a modern map of their own design that customers are invited to customise. The maps are printed onto paper gores and cut by hand. The paper is wet and stretched across the sphere before being hand painted and finished with a matte or gloss finish. The globes are weighted so they come slowly to rest when spun.

The wood and metal bases are made in the company's London studio. Their 80 series is made in connection with heritage technicians from Aston Martin. Some bases are mounted on ball bearings, others can be spun within hand-engraved solid brass meridians.

The "Pocket Globe", at around five inches in diameter, is the smallest made by the company.

The "Churchill Globe", at fifty inches in diameter, was the largest made by the company until the 2026 acquisition by National Geographic of a sixty inch diameter globe for their Museum of Exploration in Washington, DC... Its design is based on a Weber Costello, Chicago-made globe presented to Winston Churchill and Franklin Delano Roosevelt by George Marshall, the US Army's Chief of Staff during World War II.
