= Thomas Henry Manning =

British-Canadian Arctic explorer (1911–1998)

- Born: 22 December 1911; Dallington, Northampton, England
- Died: 8 November 1998 (aged 86); Smiths Falls, Ontario, Canada
- Education: Cambridge University
- Spouse: Ella Manning
- Awards: Bruce Medal, Patron's Medal, Massey Medal, Doris Huestis Speirs Award
- Scientific career
- Fields: Biology
- Workplaces: Canadian Geodetic Survey, Defence Research Board, National Museum of Canada, Canadian Wildlife Service, Arctic Institute of North America

Thomas Henry Manning, OC (22 December 1911 – 8 November 1998) was a British-Canadian Arctic explorer, biologist, geographer, zoologist, and author. Appointed an Officer of the Order of Canada, Manning held the positions of vice-chairman and executive director of the Arctic Institute of North America. Nicknamed the Lone Wolf of the Arctic, he was known for travelling alone with dog sled and canoe.

== Early years ==
Manning, son of a well-to-do farmer and a well-known cricketer, was born 22 December 1911 in Dallington, Northampton, England. He was educated at Harrow School and Cambridge University.

In the summer of 1931, he travelled in Iceland and the Faroe Islands. The following year, he hiked from France to Norway, then hiked and rode reindeer through Sweden and Finland. After arriving in the former USSR, he was arrested and imprisoned, before being deported.

== Career ==
In 1933, Manning travelled to Hudson Bay's Southampton Island. Here, he surveyed and conducted geographical research for the Royal Geographical Society, and studied birds for the British Museum. Three years later, he led the British-Canadian Arctic Expedition, serving as the expedition's surveyor and zoologist.

In 1941, Manning was commissioned as a lieutenant with the Royal Canadian Navy. He worked as a cipher officer and developed arctic clothing. In 1942, he was seconded to the US Army Corps of Engineers to consult on the construction of an airfield on Southampton Island, and in 1944, he was seconded to the Geodetic Service of Canada for photo surveys. He retired from military service as a lieutenant commander in 1945.

After the war, Manning worked for the Canadian Geodetic Survey, Defence Research Board, National Museum of Canada, and the Canadian Wildlife Service. He led several expeditions during this time. Manning was director of the Arctic Institute of North America in 1955–1956.

He was mentor to and lifelong friend of the zoologist, Andrew Hall Macpherson. For several years, the wildlife artist Brenda Carter worked as Manning's research assistant.

== Personal life ==
"If you wish to join me at Cape Dorset this summer for two years I shall be pleased. Think well. Fools rush in. I shall not be able to receive a reply. Tom Manning." (Manning's telegraphed wedding proposal to Miss Ella Wallace Jackson)

—

Manning met Ella Wallace Jackson (1906–2007), a nurse, only once, in 1935. Sent via Morse code, she received his proposal in April 1938. Three months later, "Jackie" arrived in Cape Dorset, and they were married. They honeymooned for a year and a half while mapping Baffin Island, and gathering bird specimens. They travelled in Manning's small boat, the Polecat, stocked with flour, butter, jam, milk, tobacco, pemmican, 800 litres of fuel, seven dogs, four puppies, and a sled. Years later, Ella published two books with accounts of their travels, Igloo for the night (1946), and A summer on Hudson Bay (1949). They separated amicably in the late 1960s, but did not divorce.

In his later years, Manning donated his collection of several thousand books to the Baffin Island Inuit community in Iqaluit; the Thomas Manning collection is housed at its Centennial Library. Before his death, he donated $645,000 to the Scott Polar Research Institute at Cambridge University's Shackleton Memorial Library where the Thomas H. Manning Polar Archives are named in his honour.

Manning died 8 November 1998 at a hospital in Smiths Falls, Ontario near his farm at Merrickville, Canada. Through his estate, a $25,000 bequest was made to the Merrickville Historical Society to assist in archives conservation.

== Awards ==
- 1944, W. S. Bruce Medal, Royal Scottish Geographical Society and Royal Philosophical Society of Edinburgh
- 1948, Patron's Medal, Royal Canadian Geographical Society
- 1958, Guggenheim Fellowship, Organismic Biology and Ecology
- 1974, Officer, Order of Canada
- 1977, Massey Medal, Royal Canadian Geographical Society
- 1979, Honorary Doctorate of Laws, McMaster University
- 1992, Doris Huestis Speirs Award, Society of Canadian Ornithologists

== Partial works ==
For full bibliography see: Carter, B. 2004. A Tribute to Thomas Henry Manning 1911–198. Canadian Field-Naturalist 118: 618–625. http://journals.sfu.ca/cfn/index.php/cfn/article/download/70/70

- (1939), Western Baffin Island
- (1941), The Foxe Basin coasts of Baffin Island
- (1942), Blue and lesser snow geese on Southampton and Baffin Islands
- (1942), Notes on some fish of the Eastern Canadian Arctic
- (1943), Notes on the mammals of south and central west Baffin Island
- (1947), Ruins of Eskimo stone houses on the east side of Hudson Bay
- (1950), Report on coastal waters of Hudson Bay in and around Broad River area of Manitoba
- (1951), Eskimo stone houses in Foxe Basin
- (1952), Birds of the west James Bay and southern Hudson Bay coasts.
- (1956), The northern red-backed mouse, Clethrionomys rutilus (Pallas), in Canada.
- (1956), The birds of Banks Island,
- (1958), The mammals of Banks Island
- (1960), The relationship of the Peary and barren ground caribou
- (1961), Notes on Winter Harbour, Bridport Inlet, and Skene Bay
- (1964), Age determination in the polar bear Ursus maritimus Phipps,
- (1964), Geographical and sexual variation in the long-tailed jaeger Stercorarius Longicaudus vieillot
- (1971), Geographical variation in the polar bear Ursus maritimus Phipps,
- (1974), Variations in the skull of the bearded seal, Erignathus barbatus (Erxleben)
- (1976), Birds and mammals of the Belcher, Sleeper, Ottawa and King George Islands, and Northwest Territories
- (1981), Birds of the Twin Islands, James Bay, N.W.T., Canada
