= Moira Dunbar =

Scottish-Canadian Arctic ice researcher

Isobel Moira Dunbar FRSC OC
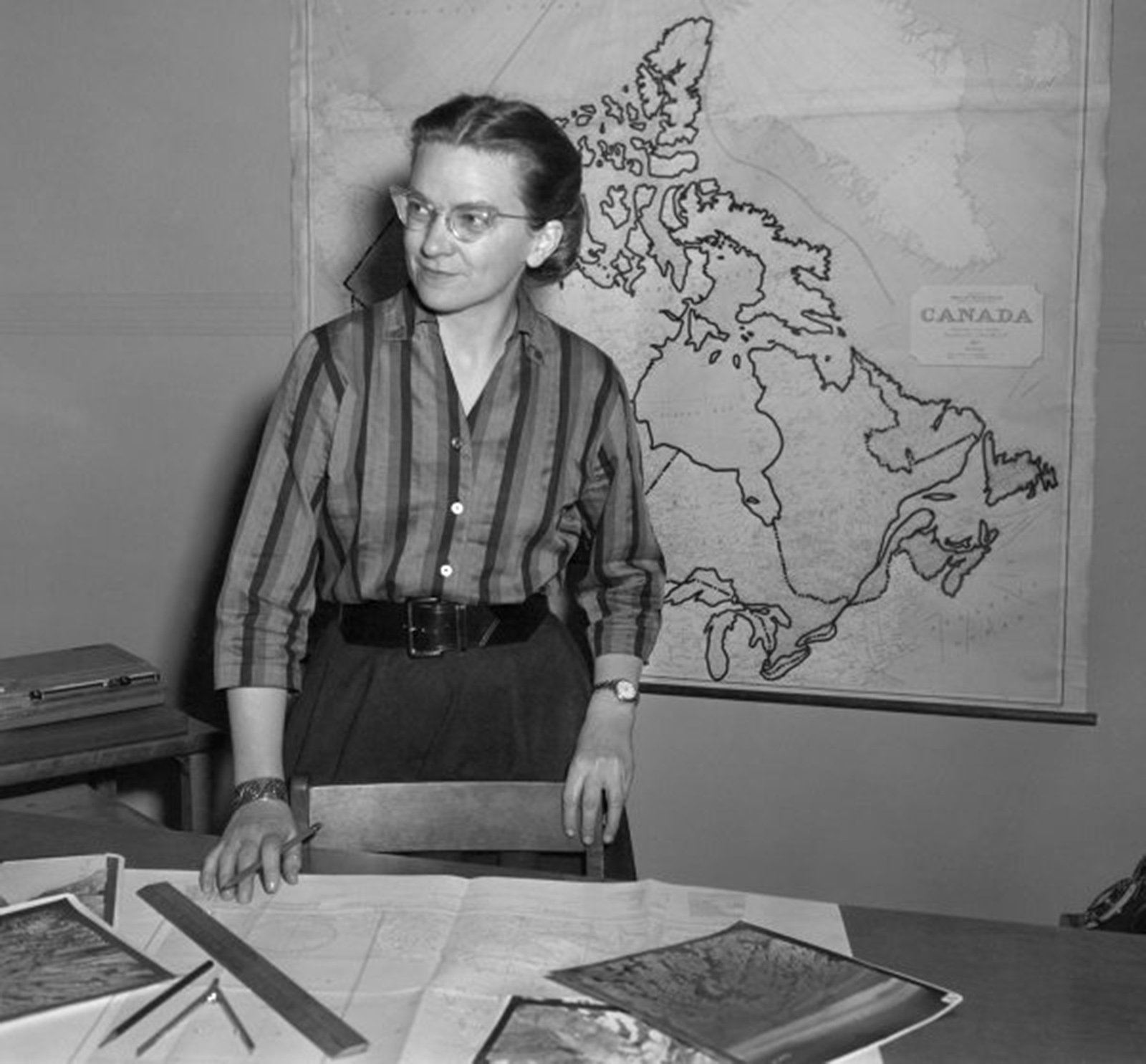
- Dunbar studying Arctic sea ice maps
- Born: Isobel Moira Dunbar; 3 February 1918; Edinburgh, Scotland
- Died: 22 November 1999 (aged 81)
- Education: BA geology
- Alma mater: St Anne's College, Oxford
- Known for: Arctic Canada from the Air
- Awards: Massey Medal; Meteorological Service of Canada Centennial Award

Isobel Moira Dunbar FRSC OC (3 February 1918 – 22 November 1999) was a Scottish-Canadian glaciologist and Arctic sea-ice researcher.

== Personal life ==
Dunbar was born in 1918 in Edinburgh, Scotland. She was raised in Stornoway, Strathpeffer, and Kilmarnock, and attended Cranley School for Girls. Her father, William John Dunbar, was a popular sheriff and advocate of the Scottish Bar. Her brother Maxwell was a marine biologist who was also made FRSC OC. Dunbar also had a sister, Elizabeth Jenkins (née Dunbar).

After emigrating to Canada and finding work with the federal government, Dunbar became a certified as a linguist in the Russian language in 1958. She was also fluent in German and French. In 1964 she went to the Soviet Union to observe their icebreaking operations with a government team.

Dunbar retired in 1978 as the Director of the Division of Earth Sciences. Following retirement, Dunbar spent much of her time at her countryside home in Dunrobin, Ontario.

Dunbar died on 22 November 1999 in Nepean, Ontario, at the age of 81. She left the acreage of property she owned in Limavady, County Londonderry, to the Queen's Foundation.

== Education and life before career ==
Dunbar began her education at Cranley School for Girls in Edinburgh, Scotland, which she attended from grades 1 to 12. She was later accepted to study geography at St Anne's College at the University of Oxford, where she completed her BA (Hons) in Geography by 1939. Dunbar then went on to complete a master's in geography in 1948.

While studying at the University of Oxford, Dunbar performed with the Oxford University Drama Society. After graduating, Dunbar worked in the theatre industry, taking part in performances for the British Army during the Second World War. She then toured the United Kingdom with the English Theatre as an actor and stage manager. Dunbar later stated that she was "hopeless as a young ingénue" and that she was "known as a character juvenile".

== Career ==
Dunbar travelled to Canada in 1947 on a visitor's visa and learned that the Canadian Government was in need of trained geographers. She joined the Joint Intelligence Bureau where her career began editing a book of Arctic terrain and sea-ice descriptions and photographs obtained by two Royal Canadian Air Force navigators, Keith Greenaway and Sidney E. Colthorpe. Dunbar's study of the 1,046,000 square kilometres (404,000 sq mi) of the Arctic mapped by the RCAF in 1947 along with the 2,359,000 km^{2} (911,000 sq mi) mapped the following year added some 13,000 km^{2} (5,000 sq mi) of land to Canadian maps, leaving only 15% of the Dominion north of 75° latitude to be mapped from the air.

In 1952 she joined the Defence Research Board in the position of scientific staff officer in the Arctic Research Section. She specialized in sea-ice and navigation through frozen Arctic waters. In 1954, she applied to join the crew of scientists on a Royal Canadian Navy icebreaker travelling to the Arctic, but her request was denied as women were not then allowed on Royal Naval vessels. In spite of Dunbar’s extensive qualifications, she experienced gender-based discrimination; initially being unable to take part in air and sea expeditions that were usually male-only undertakings. She continued her requests until being given permission to join an icebreaker with the Department of Transport in 1955. She served on numerous icebreakers and spent 560 hours on Royal Canadian Air Force aircraft, studying ice formations in the High Arctic. While upon the icebreakers, she utilized sideways-looking radar for airborne reconnaissance, examining how the ice moved through the process of photographing the ice at different times during the days and year. Her analysis of the ice conditions and measurement of the various pictures allowed her to determine the ice's position at different times of the year.

Dunbar went on many research excursions varying from flying with the RCAF to traveling on icebreakers. The combined knowledge and experience she gained enabled her to publish numerous papers on Arctic sea-ice, such as the 1956 paper she co-authored with RCAF navigator Keith Greenaway titled Arctic Canada from the Air. Dunbar and Greenway's book was the first civilian airborne geological survey of its kind and is considered essential material in the fields of Arctic and sea-ice science. In her other papers, Dunbar studied the use of radar remote-sensing in sea-ice research, promoted the standardization of sea-ice terminology, and wrote historical accounts of Arctic exploration. She investigated icebreaking methods in the Soviet Union and Finland in 1964, and was an adviser to the Canadian Defence Research Board's Arctic hovercraft trials in 1966–1969.

In 1976 while Dunbar was studying the use of radar remote sensing equipment to study the Arctic ice, she, in conjunction with the Royal Navy, used radar to map the Arctic ice surface and subsurface. While Dunbar flew overhead laser-profiling the topography of the Arctic ice surface, HMS Sovereign radar-mapped the underside of the same surface.

Dunbar retired in 1978, running a hobby farm and volunteering as a local historian.

== Achievements ==
Dunbar was being among the first women to fly over the North Pole. During her time with the Royal Canadian Air Force, she contributed 600 hours of flight time. She was also the first woman to conduct scientific research from Canadian icebreakers. Dunbar proved her worth through her studies and predictions of the movement of Arctic ice. She was the first Canadian coordinator to successfully evaluate satellite photography for ice reconnaissance. Dunbar is considered an iconic woman in Canada because she has contributed many findings about Arctic ice under the employment of the Canadian government. She recognized the immense contributions made by Russian scientists towards the study of sea-ice, and accordingly trained and certified as a Russian linguist in 1958. In 1969, Dunbar was present to observe the Arctic test of the largest icebreaker in history, the refitted tanker SS Manhattan, which was the first commercial ship to cross the Northwest Passage.

Dunbar was one of the first Arctic scientists to observe and study polynyas, open areas of water or thin ice that develop in the winter when strong winds flow South from the Arctic Ocean combine with warm upwelling in the sea.

In 1971, Dunbar won the Meteorological Service of Canada's Centennial Award. In 1972 she was awarded the Royal Canadian Geographical Society's Massey Medal for "...her excellent work in Arctic geography and sea-ice"; she is the only woman to have won the medal. She was a Fellow of the Royal Society of Canada and was made an Officer of the Order of Canada in 1977. She also served as governor of the Arctic Institute of North America and director of the Royal Canadian Geographical Society.

== Publications ==
Academic papers and field work studies written by Moira Dunbar that display her understanding of Arctic geography as well as evidence.

- "High Latitude Navigational Flights" (Arctic Circular, 1951)
- "Ice Islands: Evidence from North Greenland" (Arctic, 1953)
- "The Royal Arctic Theatre" (Canadian Art, 1958)
- "Thrust Structures in Young Sea Ice" (Journal of Glaciology, 1960)

In 1956, Dunbar co-authored Arctic Canada from the Air with RCAF Wing Commander and navigator Keith Greenaway. It was the first comprehensive aerial examination of Arctic geography by a civilian. She has also authored papers on radar remote sensing for sea-ice studies (1975), and as a proponent of winter navigation in the Gulf of St Lawrence, she and others worked to standardize sea-ice terminology (1965).

== See also ==
- Timeline of women in science
