= Camsell =

Camsell may refer to:

- George Camsell (1902–1966), English football player
- Charles Camsell (1876–1958), Canadian geologist and founder of the Royal Canadian Geographical Society
- Camsell Portage Airport (ICAO:CPJ6), an airport in Saskatchewan
