= Canadian Geographic Education =

North American educational organization

Canadian Geographic Education (Can Geo Education), formerly The Canadian Council for Geographic Education, is a joint initiative of the Royal Canadian Geographical Society of Ottawa, Ontario, and the National Geographic Society of Washington, D.C.; the initiative was established in 1993.

== Programs ==
The programs of Can Geo Education aim to foster geographic engagement in Canada. In addition to increasing the emphasis on geography within the school system, Can Geo Education endeavours to increase the geographic literacy of all Canadians through the formal K–12 education system.

=== Giant floor maps ===
Can Geo Education creates innovative educational resources for teachers in K-12 education. Since 2012, the organization has been producing giant floor maps—themed maps printed on 11 metre by 8 metre heavy-stock vinyl that can be walked on. Teachers are provided with lesson plans to educate their students on the map, and the maps circulate Canadian schools at no cost to them. Current and past themes have included the War of 1812, Canada from space (with the Canadian Space Agency), a circular North Pole map (with the Canadian Museum of Nature), the country's national parks (with Parks Canada), and North America's animal migrations (with the Canadian Wildlife Federation).

=== Canadian Geographic Challenge ===
The Canadian Geographic Challenge (formerly the Great Canadian Geography Challenge), established in 1995, is the longest-running Canadian national student geography competition organized annually by Can Geo Education for students from Grades 4 to 10. There are two levels of competition—Level 1 is for Grades 4 to 6 is at the school level only, and Level 2 for Grades 7 to 10 offers students the opportunity to compete at the provincial and national levels. At school level, students answer up to 90 geography-related questions. The student who succeeds in his school takes an online questionnaire, then can move on to provincial and national levels.

=== Other ===
Other programs of the organization include the Classroom Energy Diet Challenge with Shell Canada and Canada's Coolest School Trip with Parks Canada.

== See also ==
- Canadian Geographic
