= Massey Medal =

List of award winners

The Royal Canadian Geographical Society (RCGS) awards the Massey Medal annually to recognize outstanding personal achievement in the exploration, development or description of the geography of Canada. The award was established in 1959, by the Massey Foundation, named for industrialist Hart Massey.

== Recipients ==
- 2021 - Yvan Bédard and Barbara Sherwood Lollar
- 2020 - John Smol
- 2019 - Derek Clifford Ford
- 2018 - Arthur J. Ray
- 2017 - David A. Morrison
- 2016 - Steve Blasco
- 2015 - Brian Osborne
- 2014 - Derald Smith
- 2013 - David Ley
- 2012 - Graeme Wynn
- 2011 - David Livingstone
- 2010 - Raymond A. Price
- 2009 - Michael Church
- 2008 - Bruce Mitchell
- 2007 - Eddy Carmack
- 2006 - Serge Courville
- 2005 - Tim Oke
- 2004 - Larry Bourne
- 2003 - Richard Colebrook Harris
- 2002 - John Oliver Wheeler
- 2001 - Lawrence McCann
- 2000 - Robert McGhee
- 1999 - Alexander T. Davidson
- 1998 - William C. Wonders
- 1997 - James Archibald Houston
- 1996 - James P. Bruce
- 1995 - Pierre Camu
- 1994 - Henri Dorion
- 1993 - J. Gordon Nelson
- 1992 - Stewart Dixon MacDonald
- 1991 - George D. Hobson
- 1990 - Byron Boville
- 1989 - John D. Mollard
- 1988 - John Warkentin
- 1987 - Charles Richard Harington
- 1986 - David McCurdy Baird
- 1985 - Morley K. Thomas
- 1984 - Captain Thomas Charles Pullen
- 1983 - Willis F. Roberts
- 1982 - Trevor Lloyd
- 1981 - Raymond Thorsteinsson
- 1980 - Maurice Hall Haycock
- 1979 - Ernest Frederick Roots
- 1978 - Edward Gustav Pleva
- 1977 - Thomas Henry Manning
- 1976 - Louis-Edmond Hamelin
- 1975 - William M. Gilchrist
- 1974 - Frederick Kenneth Hare
- 1973 - Pierre Dansereau
- 1972 - Isobel Moira Dunbar
- 1971 - John Lewis Robinson
- 1970 - Murray Edmund Watts
- 1969 - Donald Fulton Putnam
- 1968 - Colonel Cyril Horace Smith
- 1967 - J. Ross Mackay
- 1966 - Alf Erling Porsild
- 1965 - Hugh Samuel Bostock
- 1964 - Yves Oscar Fortier
- 1963 - Graham Westbrook Rowley
- 1962 - Diamond Jenness
- 1961 - Owen Connor Struan Robertson
- 1960 - Keith Rogers Greenaway
- 1959 - Henry Asbjorn Larsen

== See also ==
- List of geography awards
- Massey Lectures
