= Harry J. Boyle =

Canadian broadcaster (1915–2005)

Chairman of the CRTC
- In office 1975–1977
- Preceded by: Pierre Juneau
- Succeeded by: Pierre Camu

Personal details
- Born: October 7, 1915 St. Augustine, Ontario, Canada
- Died: January 22, 2005 (aged 89) Toronto, Ontario, Canada
- Occupation: broadcast executive, writer

Harry Joseph Boyle (October 7, 1915 – January 22, 2005) was a Canadian broadcaster and writer.

He began his career in media working for a local radio station during the 1930s and later as district editor for the Stratford Beacon Herald. During this time he was also contributing articles to the London Free Press, Globe and Mail and the Toronto Telegram.

In 1942, he began working for the Canadian Broadcasting Corporation as its farm commentator as well as the director of the National Farm Radio Forum. In 1947, he launched CBC Wednesday Night, a three-hour commercial-free block of music, opera, plays, and other high-brow entertainment.

In 1968, Boyle was appointed vice-chairman of the Canadian Radio-television and Telecommunications Commission (CRTC), and in August 1975 became its chairman. He held this position until 1977.

After leaving the CRTC, he became a member of faculty at the Banff School of Fine Arts and a member of the Ontario Arts Council (1979–1982).

Boyle's writing was primarily autobiographical fiction dealing with life in rural southern Ontario during the interwar period. Two of his books were awarded the Stephen Leacock Medal for Humour: Homebrew and Patches in 1964 and Luck of the Irish in 1976.

In 1978, he was made an Officer of the Order of Canada. The same year he received an honorary doctorate from Concordia University.

== Selected publications ==
- The Inheritance: A Play in Three Acts (1949)
- Mostly in Clover (1961)
- Homebrew and Patches (1963)
- A Summer Burning (1964)
- With a Pinch of Sin (1966)
- Straws in the Wind (1969)
- The Great Canadian Novel (1972)
- Memories of a Catholic Boyhood (1973)
- The Luck of the Irish (1975)

Government offices
Preceded by Pierre Juneau	Chairman of the CRTC; 1975–1977	Succeeded by Pierre Camu
