= Charles Camsell =

Canadian geologist and commissioner of the Northwest Territories

Charles Camsell CMG FRSC
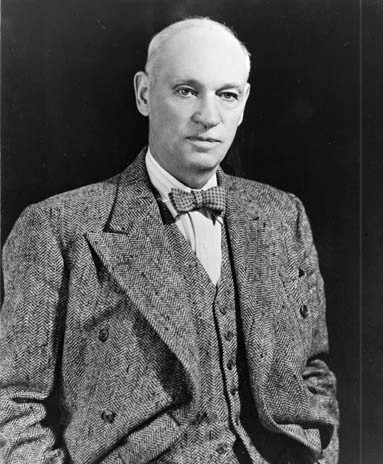
- Born: February 8, 1876; Fort Liard, Northwest Territories
- Died: December 19, 1958 (aged 82); Ottawa, Ontario, Canada
- Education: St. John's College; University of Manitoba
- Occupation: Geologist
- Known for: Deputy minister of mines (1920–1946); Commissioner of the Northwest Territories (1936–1946); President of the Canadian Geographical Society (1929–1941)
- Notable work: Founded the Canadian Geographical Society in 1929

Charles Camsell CMG FRSC (February 8, 1876 – December 19, 1958) was a Canadian geologist and the commissioner of the Northwest Territories from December 3, 1936, to December 3, 1946.

== Early life ==
He was born in 1876 in Fort Liard, Northwest Territories, the son of a Hudson's Bay Company factor, Julian Stuart Camsell and Métis woman, Sarah Foulds. In 1894, he earned a Bachelor of Arts in Natural Science at the University of Manitoba. Following graduation, he returned to the north where he and his brother caught gold rush fever and set out to stake a claim in Yukon. It was at this time that he developed an interest in geology and exploration.

== Career with the public service of Canada ==
Camsell had a long and outstanding career with the Public Service of Canada commencing in 1904.

In June 1904, Charles received a letter from the head of the GSC, appointing him to a job he had not even applied for. He spent the early part of his career on various geological expeditions that took him to some of the most remote locations in the North. He also did geological fieldwork in southern British Columbia, taking a detailed survey of the unique gold deposits of Nickel Plate Mountain.

— The GSC years — from north to south

In 1920, he was appointed Deputy Minister of Mines and, in 1936, Deputy Minister of Mines and Resources.

He retired from the Public Service of Canada in 1946 at the age of 70.

== Other contributions and recognition ==
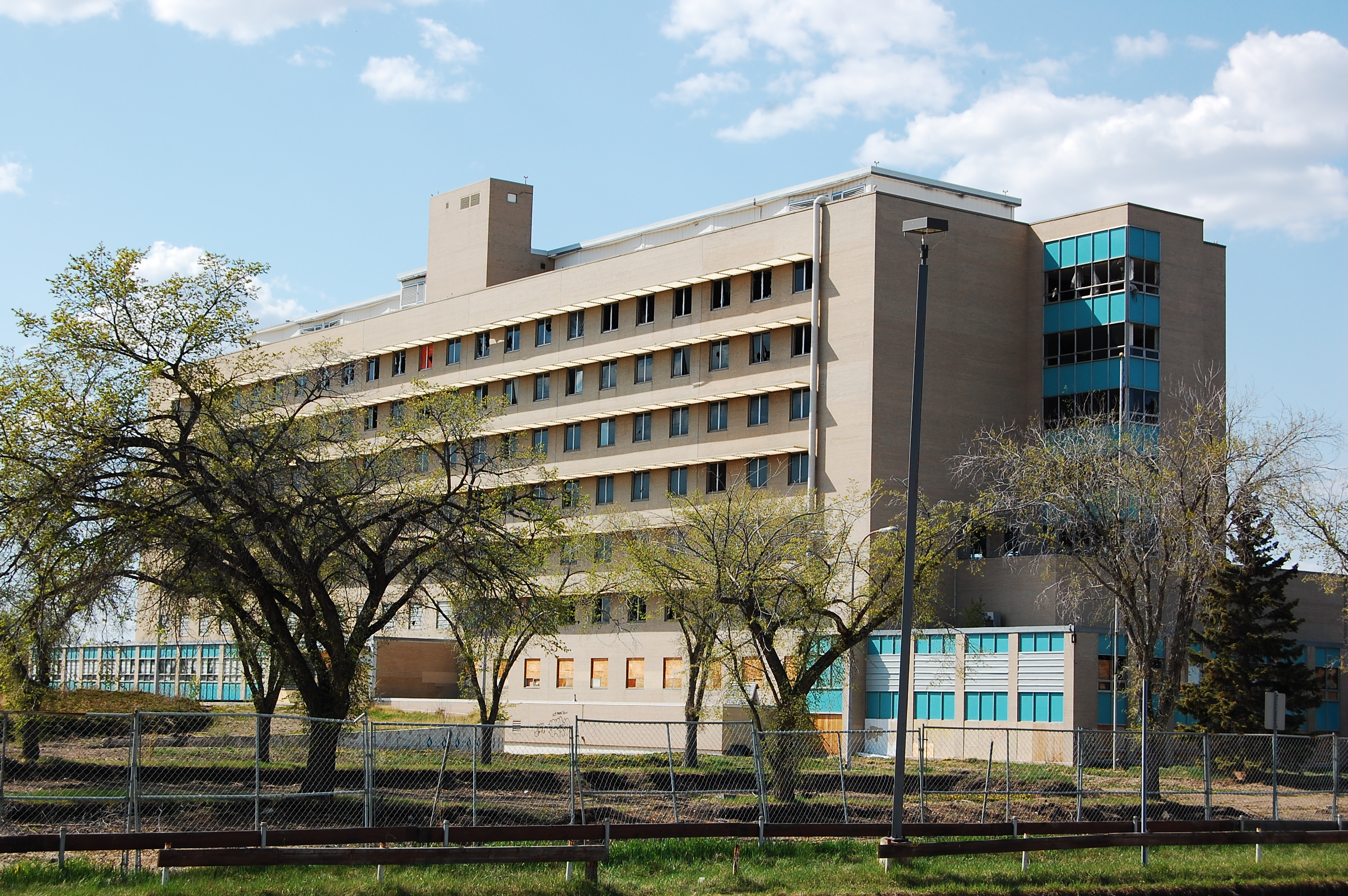
Camsell is the namesake of the Charles Camsell Hospital in Edmonton.

From 1930 to 1931 Camsell was President of the Royal Society of Canada. The Royal Society of Canada is the senior national body of distinguished Canadian scientists and scholars. Its primary objective is to promote learning and research in the natural and social sciences and in the humanities.

From 1941 Camsell was an original standing committee member of the Foundation for the Study of Cycles. The Foundation for the Study of Cycles is an international non-profit research organisation for the study of cycles of events.

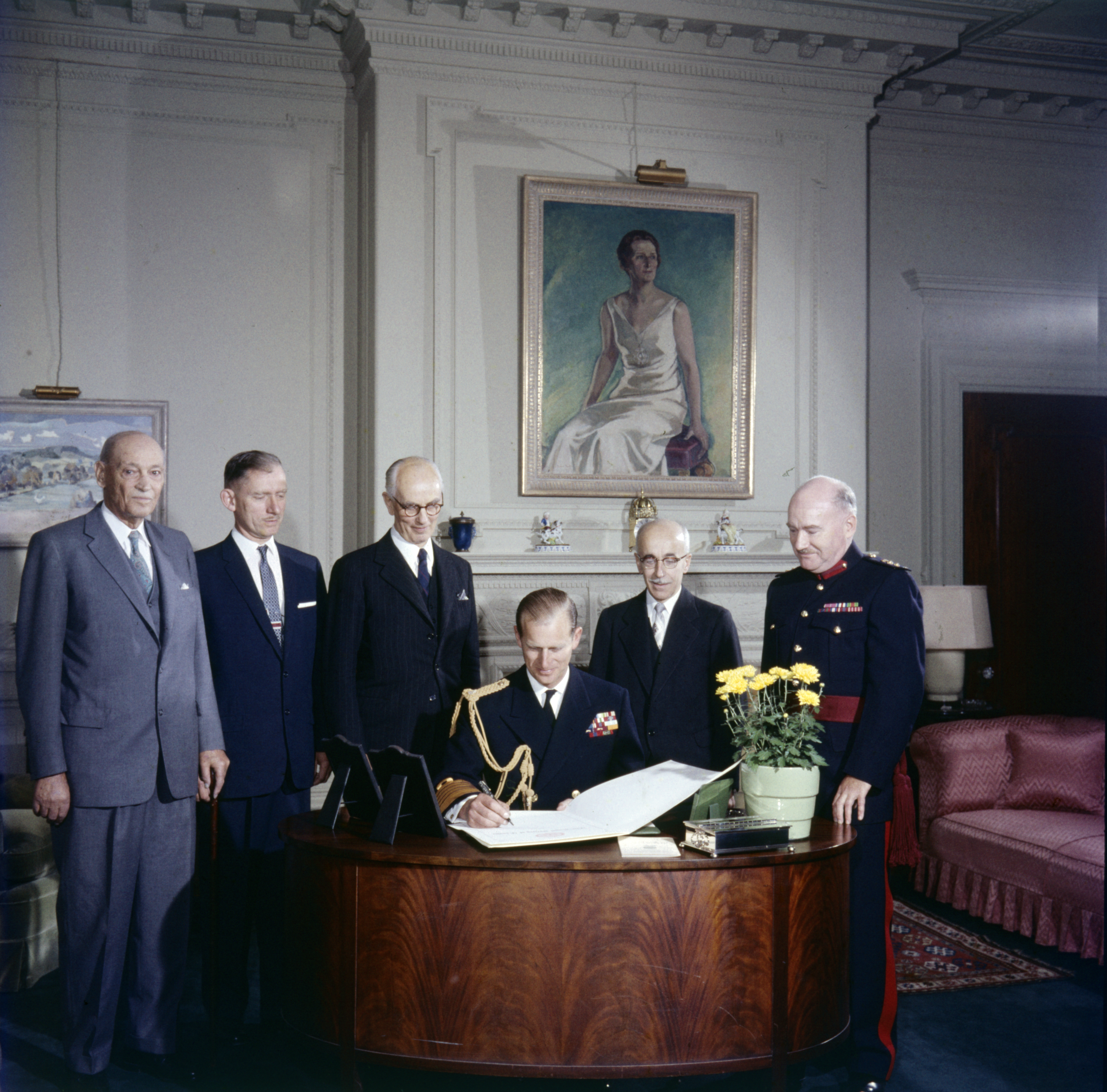
Visit of Prince Philip (seated) to the Royal Society of Canada. Officers of the Society (standing left to right): Dr. Charles Camsell, Dr. L.S. Russell, Dr. T.W.N. Cameron, president Leon Marion and Colonel C.P. Stacey

Camsell founded the Canadian Geographical Society (now the Royal Canadian Geographical Society) in 1929, and was its president from 1930 to 1941. The Royal Canadian Geographical Society is a Canadian non-profit educational organization dedicated to imparting a broader knowledge and deeper appreciation of Canada — its people and places, its natural and cultural heritage and its environmental, social and economic challenges. The Society is the publisher of Canadian Geographic magazine and its French-language counterpart Géographica.

In 1935 Camsell was made Companion of the Order of St Michael and St George by King George V. In 1945 the Royal Geographical Society of London awarded him their Founder's Medal for his contributions to geology.

The Charles Camsell Hospital, opened in Edmonton in 1946, was named after Camsell.

== Archives ==
There is a Charles Camsell fonds at Library and Archives Canada. Archival reference number is R1528.

Professional and academic associations
Preceded by Arthur Stewart Eve	President of the Royal Society of Canada; 1930–1931	Succeeded by Robert Falconer
