= Mondetta =

Canadian clothing company

- Type: Privately held
- Industry: Fashion/apparel/clothing
- Founded: 1986
- Headquarters: Winnipeg, Canada
- Key people: Ash Modha, CEO, Head Designer; Raj Bahl, VP-Sales, Prashant Modha, VP-Finance, Kish Modha, VP-Human Resources
- Products: Casual sportswear, active wear
- Divisions: Mondetta; Mondetta Originals; MPG; Modern Ambition
- Website: https://mpgsport.ca

Mondetta Clothing Inc. is a Canadian leisure and sportswear design and manufacturing company, best known for its world flag-themed apparel. Based in Winnipeg, Manitoba, Mondetta has four main divisions: Mondetta, Mondetta Originals, MPG, and Modern Ambition.

The name Mondetta comes from combining the French word monde ('world') with the Latin suffix -etta ('small'); thus the company name translates to 'small world'.

== History ==
=== Origins ===
Mondetta Clothing was started in 1986 by two sets of brothers—Ash and Prashant Modha, and Raj and Amit Bahl—along with the Modhas' cousin, Pratik Modha, who left shortly after its inception.

Born in East Africa, both sets of brothers were forced out by Ugandan dictator Idi Amin in 1972 due to their Indian ancestry, and found refuge in Winnipeg, Manitoba, Canada. Though both families had emigrated from East Africa to Canada in the early 1970s, the four boys only met while studying at the University of Winnipeg/UW Collegiate. Ash graduated from The Collegiate in 1987 and obtained his BA in Economics at the University of Manitoba; Prashant studied science at UWinnipeg and went on to obtain his MBA at UManitoba and CFA; Raj studied science at UWinnipeg and graduated from UManitoba with a degree in Applied Economics.

Their first venture was selling business cards and stationery for candidates running for the U of Winnipeg Student Association (UWSA). Upon seeing the cards, the editor of The Uniter, the university's student newspaper, saw those cards and requested the young men to create T-shirts for his team. Selling the T-shirts for CA$8 each while costing only $2.50 to make, the men discovered there was money to be made in such a business. They subsequently put logos onto sweatshirts and began selling those on campus, out of their lockers.

=== Founding ===
The Mondetta company was founded in 1986; its name was derived from combining the French word monde ('world') with the Latin suffix -etta ('small'), thus forming 'small world'. Initially based out of the basements of their parents’ houses, they sold their clothes via a pushcart. In the summer of 1986, the Modha-Bahl team took to selling their homemade sportswear to the youth demographic at Grand Beach, located on Lake Winnipeg. The following summer, however, the men did not do as well as the previous year due to a competitor now occupying the beach as well.

Their next trip was down Manitoba Highway 59, where they brought along a team of skateboarders dressed in Mondetta's signature beach wear. They set up a show directly beside a stage where a local band, the Crash Test Dummies, was attracting huge crowds. It turned out that Brad Roberts, the band's lead singer, had his locker next to theirs on the U of Winnipeg campus.

Early on, the Modhas' uncle, Kish Modha, offered some initial loans, advice and guidance to the company; years later, Kish became the general manager and then, Vice President of Mondetta. Because of him, according to Raj, the team was able to buy their first computer in 1988: an Apple Macintosh SE/30 that cost $6,000.

In 1988, Ash spotted a German flag on the back of a Volkswagen Beetle and was inspired to transpose the flag to a sweatshirt. The partners decided to opt for appliqué patches and embroidery that would emblazon their sweatshirts with the flags of different countries. Though this was more expensive, it meant that their products were "cut and constructed above the average," allowing them to sell their wares at a significantly higher price-point than comparable product in the market at the time. The Flag Shirt, as it came to be known, "skyrocketed [the company] to the forefront of Canadian fashion," according to Brandchannel. To accompany their sportswear with a global theme of "A World Undivided," the phrase "A Spirit of Unification" was coined and appeared on the first Flag Shirts.

=== 1992-1995 expansion and licensing ===
As Mondetta experienced exponential growth, soaring sales, and increased exposure, the company diversified its product line by introducing more and more pieces each season whilst also engaging in licensing agreements to offer an even wider array of products. These included a women’s line, denim, golf, timepieces, and a kids line. Upon releasing the Mondetta golf line in 1994, a sponsorship agreement was reached with LPGA regular Vicki Goetze. Licensing deals included agreements with the 1994 World Cup Soccer program and American Colleges program. The company also made ventures into foreign markets such as the US, Italy, Japan, Korea and Croatia.

In 1995, Mondetta entered into a partnership with Dale Wallis and Aubrey Margolis to open a Mondetta-themed restaurant and retail store, respectively, at The Forks in Winnipeg. The former previously ran the Grapes chain of restaurants while the latter owned Danali, a clothing store that was one of the first to carry Mondetta Clothing. The Mondetta World Café, though not unlike Planet Hollywood or Hard Rock Cafe, was different in that it was based on a fashion label rather than music or films. The restaurant eventually closed in late 1999.

=== 1995-1998 ===
In 1995, co-founder Amit Bahl left the company. A downturn in sales during the latter half of the 90s caused by waning market demand coupled with Mondetta's loss of focus resulted in a complete overhaul of the company business. In addition to withdrawing other licenses, Mondetta severed its agreement with an American distributor, stymied by the 'sprawling consumer marketplace'.

The company sought assistance through a private equity investment from Crocus Investment Fund. The $800,000 injection allowed Mondetta to form a corporate division to create custom-made, high-quality sportswear marketed directly to such companies and organizations as Sony, BMW, American Ballet Theatre, Cirque du Soleil, Earls, as well as local firms such as Palliser Furniture, Manitoba Lotteries Corporation, and the Winnipeg Airport Authority. The venture into corporate wear was short-lived but allowed the company, in co-operation with their Hong Kong and China offices, to fine-tune production processes and systems to "aggressively market the service to customers across the country."

In 2000, Mondetta stopped manufacturing its popular flag sweatshirts.

=== 2003-present ===
From 2001 onwards, the company was focused on three main divisions: retail, private label, and corporate. The corporate program grew 50% in one year, retail continued to represent 60% of total company revenue while the private label division generated sales of $1 million in revenue a year after its introduction. The private label division creates branded products for retailers looking to offer their customers their own signature brand.

In 2002, the company founded its lifestyle brand Mondetta Performance Gear (MPG), a line of activewear for athletes and dancers.

Returning to golf in 2003, Mondetta added wind shirts, rain gear and golf accessories such as bags to the apparel line of golf products. The return to golf was made possible, in part, by their Hong Kong office's development of technical fabrics. Six months later, Mondetta announced a sponsorship agreement with Canadian pro golfer, Glen Hnatiuk, who is originally from Selkirk, Manitoba. Of the sponsorship, Hnatiuk said, "Being a Winnipeg-based company, it seems like a nice fit."

In 2006, Mondetta bought back the stake of the company held by Crocus, regaining full control of the company.

Since the company shifted focus to corporate accounts and then later, private label customers, Mondetta maintained retail ties with a select number of stores to carry its product. The flag clothing was not being produced nor marketed for the general public but the company continually received calls asking if they would ever return. In 2009, the flag-themed clothing was re-introduced. The product was primarily sold at Costco in two-week stints at two stores at a time. These limited engagement 'roadshows' were part of Costco's 'Show Your Pride in 2010' promotions and were held in the months leading up to the 2010 Winter Olympics in Vancouver, British Columbia. In an effort to capitalize on the 2010 FIFA World Cup held in South Africa, Mondetta introduced a line of World Cup-themed track jackets featuring the flags of some of the stronger teams in the tournament.

In 2021, during the COVID-19 pandemic, president and CEO Ash Modha offered Mondetta staff a $300 cash bonus as incentive to get the COVID-19 vaccine.

==== Canadian Curling Association and Olympics ====
Since 2005, Mondetta has supplied the Canadian Curling Association with uniforms for both and men and women. The men's gold winning and women's silver winning teams at the 2010 Winter Olympics in Vancouver were outfitted with custom-made uniforms, designed and manufactured with the specific needs of curlers in mind. Replica lines of the official uniform was simultaneously sold across the country.

Mondetta would go on to create the uniform program for the 2014 Olympics in Sochi, Russia.

== Divisions/brands ==
Mondetta has 3 brands under its wing:

- Mondetta Originals — a clothing line that renews Mondetta's original collections from the company's early days till 2000, particularly its "world flag" collection.
- Mondetta Performance Gear (MPG) — an activewear brand
- Modern Ambition — a business and formalwear brand
- Mondetta Charity Foundation — a foundation established by Mondetta in 2004 to implement charitable initiatives in Uganda and Kenya. MPG donates a portion of annual sales to the Foundation.

=== Mondetta Originals ===
Mondetta Originals is a clothing line that renews Mondetta's original collections from the company's early days, particularly its "world flag" collection.

Having stopped manufacturing its signature flag sweatshirts in 2000, the company announced in 2018 that it would be bringing the collection back. The original sweatshirt featured one large country flag crest on the front; with the renewed collection, the shirt now also includes a removable and interchangeable arm patch—which can either be a flag of a country, a Pride flag, or a peace sign.

=== MPG ===
Mondetta Performance Gear, better known as MPG, is a lifestyle brand of activewear for athletes and dancers. Founded in 2002, the brand's clothing has been described by the Daily News Record as "fashion-forward but technical" sportswear constructed from specialized fabric.
