= University of Winnipeg Collegiate =

Location
- 515 Portage Avenue; Winnipeg, Manitoba, R3B 2E9; Canada; 49.8909°N 97.1534°W

Information
- School type: Private
- Founded: 1873
- Dean: Osaed Khan
- Grades: 9-12
- Enrollment: 500
- Language: English
- Campus: University of Winnipeg
- Team name: Junior Wesmen
- Newspaper: The Communicator
- Website: www.uwinnipeg.ca

The University of Winnipeg Collegiate, also commonly called The Collegiate, is a private, university-preparatory high school. Founded in 1873 within Wesley College, The Collegiate is the oldest high school in the province of Manitoba. The school is located in downtown Winnipeg on the University of Winnipeg campus.

== Admissions ==
There is limited enrollment for grade 9 (45 students), grade 10 (60 students), grade 11 (75 students), and grade 12 (135 students). Because of the limited enrollment for grade 9 and 10, all applicants are required to meet with The Collegiate Dean for an interview.

The U of W Collegiate has had a recent influx of new students, particularly in the grade 9, because of its new popularity.

== Academics ==
The Collegiate's academic programme is university preparatory; the curriculum is based on Manitoba Ministry of Education standards. The academic year follows closely with the University of Winnipeg's, which gives Collegiate students the opportunity to experience a pace consistent with University.

== Faculty and staff ==
The school is administered by acting Dean Osaed Khan as Kevin Clace retired July 2024. The new acting associate Dean is Cameron Cerasani. There are 32 faculty members in total, 28 of which teach at the school and 16 of which hold advanced degrees.

== Campus ==
=== Wesley Hall ===
Wesley Hall is located at the south end of the University of Winnipeg campus, facing Portage Avenue. The four-floor stone 'sand castle' serves as the primary academic facility for The Collegiate, which is also the flagship building for the University of Winnipeg. The landmark sandstone building, sometimes referred to as the 'castle', underwent extensive renovations which were completed in 2006. The renovations on the heritage building, which totaled well over $7.5 million, had focused primarily on the stone exterior, which had been heavily worn down over the century. The renovations also included the installation of new windows and replacement of the roof. The administrative offices of the Dean of The Collegiate and admission services are located on the 1st floor of Wesley Hall, after being moved from the 2nd floor in the summer of 2008. Tony's Cafeteria was formerly located on the main floor, but was closed in the summer of 2008 to make room for more classrooms. Thanks to a donation from the family of Douglas Leatherdale, a new Tony's Cafeteria and Leatherdale Commons (Leatherdale Hall) was completed for the 2017/18 academic year.

=== Manitoba Hall ===
Manitoba Hall is north of Sparling Hall, the building is primarily composed of chemistry labs and classrooms. A few first and second-floor classrooms are used for Collegiate classes during the academic year.

=== Sparling Hall ===
Sparling Hall is located north and west of Wesley Hall. Most Collegiate activities take place in Wesley Hall, however classes at the school are also taught at Sparling Hall and Manitoba Hall. Sparling also houses the Aurora Family Therapy Centre and Technology Solutions Centre.

=== Centennial Hall ===
Centennial Hall is a four-storey building that houses the University of Winnipeg's library on the fourth-floor. Collegiate students have full access to the university library catalogue.

== Notable alumni ==
- Wab Kinew, 25th Premier of Manitoba, Musician, Broadcaster
- David Asper, Owner of the Winnipeg Sea Bears, former vice-president of CanWest Global Communications Corp, Lawyer
- Luke Doucet, Songwriter, Musician
- Jeff Golfman, businessman
- Geoff Gray, football player
- Chantal Kreviazuk, Singer-Songwriter
- Ash Modha, CEO of Mondetta
