= Marc-André Bédard =

Marc-André Bédard may refer to:

- Marc-André Bédard (politician) (1935–2020), Canadian politician
- Marc-André Bédard (biathlete) (born 1986), Canadian biathlete
