= John Meisel =

Canadian political scientist (1923–2025)

Chairman of the CRTC
- In office 1980–1983
- Preceded by: Pierre Camu
- Succeeded by: André Bureau

Personal details
- Born: October 23, 1923 Vienna, Austria
- Died: March 30, 2025 (aged 101) Kingston, Ontario, Canada
- Education: Victoria College; London School of Economics (PhD)
- Occupation: Professor, political scientist

John Meisel CC (October 23, 1923 – March 30, 2025) was a Canadian political scientist, professor, and scholar, and chairman of the Canadian Radio-television and Telecommunications Commission.

Meisel wrote on various aspects of politics, notably on parties, elections, ethnic relations, politics and leisure culture, and, at the beginning of his academic career, international politics.

Meisel was a pioneer in Canada of research on electoral behaviour, political parties and the relationship between politics and leisure culture, particularly the arts. Throughout his career he examined the cohesion (or its absence) of the Canadian communities. He also lectured and wrote about regulation, broadcasting, telecommunications, and the information society.

== Career ==
Meisel was born in Vienna, Austria in October 1923 to Jewish Czech parents. His father worked for Baťa Shoes at its headquarters in Zlín, Moravia, Czechoslovakia in the 1930s. As the Nazi occupation of Czechoslovakia became imminent, Baťa sent its Jewish employees out of Czechoslovakia to Bata centres abroad, and the Meisel family moved to Casablanca and then Haiti before settling in Bata's Canadian company town of Batawa, Ontario in 1942.

John Meisel matriculated from Pickering College in Newmarket, Ontario. He received his university training at the University of Toronto's Victoria College, and the London School of Economics. He taught at Queen's University since 1949, where he was a professor emeritus. He served on the Ontario Advisory Committee on Confederation in 1965.

Meisel worked on the 1965 Canadian National Election Study, and was a member of the ICPSR (Inter-university Consortium for Political and Social Research) Council from 1966 to 1968.

In 1975, he was a consultant for the Trilateral Commission's report Crisis of Democracy. From 1980 to 1983 he was Chairman of the Canadian Radio-television and Telecommunications Commission. From 1992 until 1995, he was the 103rd President of the Royal Society of Canada.

In 1989 he was made an Officer of the Order of Canada; promoted to Companion in 1999.

Meisel was the founding editor of The Canadian Journal of Political Science and of The International Political Science Review. The John Meisel Lecture in Contemporary Political Controversies, established in 2017 by the Department of Political Studies at Queen's, is an annual lecture that honours Meisel by highlighting a scholar working on complex political issues.

== Philanthropy ==
In addition to his contributions to Canadian university research and public communications, Dr Meisel is known for his philanthropy in Kingston, Ontario. One gift was his 50-hectare property near Crow Lake north of Kingston. This was donated to the Rideau Valley Conservation Foundation in 2000 as a sanctuary of peace and quiet for the residents of Eastern Ontario. The property is called the Meisel Woods Conservation Area. Over the years, modest improvements and public safety features have been installed. A commemorative trail called the Sandi Slater Memorial Walk has been added by the Foundation.

== Death ==
Meisel died in Kingston, Ontario on March 30, 2025, at the age of 101.

Government offices
Preceded by Pierre Camu	Chairman of the CRTC; 1980–1983	Succeeded by André Bureau
Professional and academic associations
Preceded by Jules Deschênes	President of the Royal Society of Canada; 1992–1995	Succeeded by Robert Haynes
