= Centre for Geography and Exploration =

Headquarters of Canadian non-profit organization

Coordinates: 45.442168°N 75.695679°W

Canada and the World Pavilion

The Centre for Geography and Exploration, located at 50 Sussex Drive in Ottawa, is headquarters to the Royal Canadian Geographical Society (RCGS) and home to Canadian Geographic magazine, as well as Can Geo Education and special project departments.

The Canada and the World Pavilion was a small museum in Ottawa, Ontario, Canada. Exhibits were devoted to Canada's contribution to sport, arts and culture, development, peacekeeping, and science. Interactive exhibits, activities, and special events were held at the facility and in the surrounding parkland.

With views to the north, the building overlooks the Rideau Falls and Ottawa River. It is the next-door neighbour to the Embassy of France at 42 Sussex Drive.

== The history ==
Less than 1.5 kilometres southwest of the Rideau Falls on the Ottawa River, 50 Sussex Drive was the home to historic gatherings of Algonquin people. Indigenous families came to the delta where the Riviere Gatineau meets the Ottawa River to hunt game, pick berries, fish and trade.

In 2000, the Canada and the World Pavilion was built as part of the National Film Board of Canada's exhibition. After several years of mediocre attendance, the facility closed in the fall of 2005.

In October 2016, the RCGS and the National Capital Commission announced the vacant building would be transformed into Canada's Centre for Geography and Exploration.

50 Sussex was identified by the National Capital Commission as one of ten "Confederation Pavilions" in the National Capital Region as part of events celebrating Canada's sesquicentennial in 2017.

The refurbished facility opened in two stages - for exhibits in 2017 and then fully in 2018.

In May 2018, The RCGS and Canadian Geographic magazine moved into the new permanent home at 50 Sussex Drive. One year after move-in, RCGS officially unveiled a plaque declaring Canada's Centre for Geography and Exploration the official home of the Society.

== Famous visitors ==
Jeopardy's Alex Trebek, Prime Minister Justin Trudeau, Jane Goodall, Michael Palin, Wade Davis and Roberta Bondar are famous people who have spent time in the facility.

== In the building now ==
Two galleries fill the main and upper floors. Exhibits have included one on the NCC's 50-year plan for Ottawa, the debut of Thirteen Moons by Alex Janvier and exploration exhibits relating to the Inuit of the Canadian Arctic. The main gallery contains the first Google Earth Wall in Canada - a three metre high screen that allows users to view and engage with geographical and social issues. Exhibit spaces are also used for private events including meetings, symposiums and weddings, operating under the '50 Sussex Drive' brand for bookings.

In 2025, The Canada Globe was unveiled. The traditionally handcrafted and hand painted world globe was created by Bellerby & Co, Globemakers and includes the society’s coat of arms and its motto Ducit Amor Patriae – Love of country leads me. The huge globe − which is five feet across − is the largest globe produced since the U.S. Army commissioned globes from a cartographer for Churchill and Roosevelt during the Second World War.

Another feature of 50 Sussex Drive is the Alex Trebek Theatre. The space has 280 seats and hosts lectures by geographers, explorers, photographers and educators, as well as the Can Geo Talks events. Film screenings and Can Geo Education events are also held in the theatre.
