= Eddy Carmack =

Canadian geographer

- Born: 1943 (age 82–83) (Note: In 2018, Carmack was reported to be 75); Sidney, British Columbia
- Education: University of Washington
- Occupation: Oceanographer
- Spouse: Carole
- Awards: Order of Canada

Edward C. Carmack OC (born 1943) is a senior research scientist emeritus for the Department of Fisheries and Oceans in Sidney, British Columbia. He also worked with the Institute of Ocean Sciences in Sidney, British Columbia and as an adjunct professor at the University of British Columbia.

He is an Officer in the Order of Canada, a 2005 Fellow of the American Geophysical Union, the 2007 Massey medalist of the Royal Canadian Geographic Society, the 2010 Tully medalist for the Canadian Meteorological and Oceanographic Society, and the 2018 recipient of the International Mohn Prize for lifetime achievement in research related to the Arctic.

== Early life and education ==
While earning his master's degree at the University of Washington in 1969, Carmack was offered a position on an Arctic research trip as a replacement for a colleague.

== Career ==
After graduating, Carmack worked for Environment Canada studying Canadian lakes and rivers, before switching to the Department of Fisheries and Oceans to research Arctic ice and oceans. During the 1994 Canada/United States expedition to the North Pole on CCGS Louis S. St-Laurent, Carmack was along as Canada's chief scientist. From 2006 until 2015, Carmack also served as the Sydney Chapman Chair at the University of Alaska Fairbanks.

In 2007, Carmack led a research project titled The Canada's Three Oceans (C3O) in order to study changes in the Arctic Ocean due to global warming, including ice cover retreat, species invasion, hypoxia and acidification. While collecting data, Carmack would drop bottles into the Arctic water containing messages from elementary school students and his contact information to track how the changes in the Arctic can spread into other bodies of water. Later that year, he received the Massey Medal from the Royal Canadian Geographical Society for his outstanding work in ocean science.

In 2009, Carmack received the J.P. Tully Medal in Oceanography from the Canadian Meteorological and Oceanographic Society. He would later be appointed the Program Research Director of the Resilience Alliance Board in 2011 and retire from the Institute of Ocean Sciences. In 2016, Carmack was replaced as the Sydney Chapman Chair at the University of Alaska Fairbanks by mathematical physicist Jürgen Kurths. Two years later, he was the recipient of the Mohn Prize from the Arctic University of Norway. In 2019, Carmack was appointed an Officer of the Order of Canada.

Carmack's research involves systems-level relationships between oceanography, marine ecosystems and climate. Over his 50 year career he has participated in over 90 field investigations in high-latitude rivers, lakes and seas spanning from the Antarctic to the Arctic and from the Yukon to Siberia. From this he has published over 220 peer-reviewed scientific articles with over 20,000 citations. He pioneered the use of science capable CCG icebreakers and created ongoing studies that engage Northern residents in ocean monitoring. He has served as Chief Canadian scientist for co-operative studies of the subarctic North Pacific with Russia, for the 1994 Canada/US expedition to the North Pole, and the ‘Canada’s Three Oceans’ project to establish an oceanographic baseline for the oceans encircling Canada.

In retirement he continues field-oriented studies in the Northwest Passage, and locally ‘captains’ his 34’ troller conversion R/V Wicklow to demonstrate values of small boat oceanography.
