= The Canadian Geographer =

- Discipline: Geography
- Language: English
- Edited by: Nadine Schuurman

Publication details
- History: 1950-present
- Publisher: Wiley-Blackwell on behalf of the Canadian Association of Geographers / l'Association canadienne des géographes
- Frequency: Quarterly
- Impact factor: 1.032 (2019)

Standard abbreviations
- ISO 4: Can. Geogr.

Indexing
- ISSN: 0008-3658 (print); 1541-0064 (web)

Links
- Journal homepage; Online access; Online archive

The Canadian Geographer (French: Le Géographe Canadien) is a quarterly peer-reviewed academic journal, published in English and French by Wiley-Blackwell on behalf of the Canadian Association of Geographers.

== Description ==
The journal was established in 1950. Its editor-in-chief is Nadine Schuurman. The journal publishes contemporary geographical research that addresses significant social, scientific and technical issues in Canada and globally.

According to the Journal Citation Reports, the journal had a 2011 impact factor of 0.561, ranking it 54th out of 73 journals in the category "Geography".

== See also ==
- List of social science journals
