= Jeff Golfman =

Canadian businessman (born 1968)

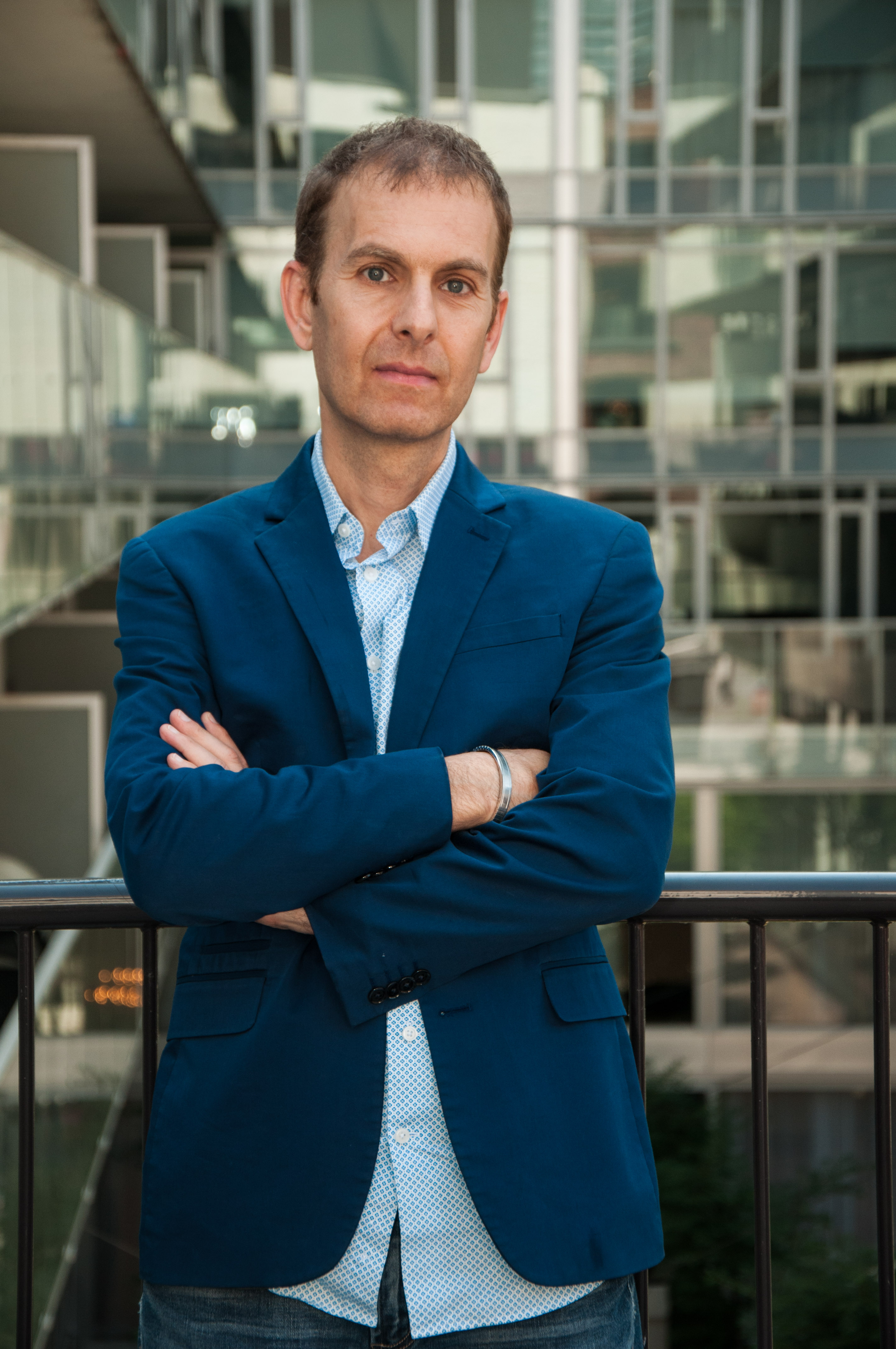
- Born: May 13, 1968 (age 58); Vancouver, British Columbia
- Occupation: Entrepreneur
- Years active: 1990–present

Jeff Golfman (born May 13, 1968) is a Canadian businessman, entrepreneur, inventor and author.

== Background ==
Golfman was born on May 13, 1968, in Vancouver, British Columbia. He is a graduate of the University of Winnipeg Collegiate, and the Ivey Business School at University of Western Ontario.

== Career ==
Golfman's career in environmental entrepreneurship began in 1990 when he launched the first curbside recycling program in Winnipeg.

=== Prairie Paper Inc. (1998–2015) ===
In January 1998, Golfman and actor Woody Harrelson co-founded Prairie Paper Inc., a venture dedicated to manufacturing "tree-free" paper from agricultural waste. The company's flagship product, "Step Forward Paper," is composed of 80% wheat straw waste and reached mass distribution through major retailers like Staples.

=== The Raw Office (2015–2025) ===
In December 2015, Golfman founded The Raw Office, a certified B Corp specializing in sustainable procurement for corporate offices. The organization became the only 100% carbon-neutral office supply company in North America, utilizing a proprietary "Responsibility Score" to evaluate product environmental impact.

=== Send 123 Inc. (2025–present) ===
In 2025, Golfman transitioned into Send 123 Inc., an AI-powered smart procurement and supply chain software provider. The company's proprietary AI-Procurement technology provides businesses with automated reporting, data-driven recommendations, and cost-saving insights to improve operational visibility.

== Philanthropy ==
In 1991, Golfman founded Green Kids Inc., a nonprofit live theatre group which helps educate young people on environmental subjects. In 2026, the organization rebranded and changed its name to **Wild Roots**. In 2017, Golfman organized a fundraiser for Margaret's Housing and Community Support Services, raising about $177,000.

== Awards and publications ==
In 2009, Golfman received the Silver Lining Award for Pulse Furniture. In 2013 Golfman was awarded the 3M Environmental Innovation Award by the Royal Canadian Geographical Society for his work in Prairie Paper.

In 2013 Golfman published a book, The Cool Vegetarian; he also publishes a blog by the same name. Also in 2013, Golfman was one of four Manitobans nominated for the Manning Innovation Awards.

In 2016, he was a finalist for the Brightlane Entrepreneur Awards for The Raw Office.

Golfman has also been a guest writer at Entrepreneur since 2016.

Other awards include the Federal Business Development Bank's Entrepreneur of the Year award, the Sustainable Development Award of Excellence, and the 2012 Envirokidz Giving Back Award.
