= André Bureau =

Canadian lawyer and businessman (1935–2019)

- Born: October 10, 1935; Trois-Rivières, Quebec, Canada
- Died: April 12, 2019 (aged 83); Montreal, Quebec, Canada
- Awards: Order of Canada

André Bureau, OC OQ (October 10, 1935 – April 12, 2019) was a Canadian lawyer and communications executive.

Born in Trois-Rivières, Quebec, he received an LL.B. from Université Laval in 1958 and a D.E.A. from the University of Paris I: Panthéon-Sorbonne in 1960. He was called to the Quebec Bar in 1959.

From 1968 to 1972, he was an Executive Vice-President at La Presse, one of Quebec's largest French-language daily newspapers. He returned to practicing law from 1973 to 1976 before being appointed Executive Vice-President at Télémédia Communications Ltée in 1976. He was president from 1980 to 1981 and president of Telemedia Ventures from 1981 to 1982. From 1982 to 1983, he was president and CEO of Canadian Satellite Communications Inc. From 1983 to 1989, he was Chairman of the Canadian Radio-television and Telecommunications Commission (CRTC). He then became President and CEO of Astral Inc and president of Astral Broadcasting Group Inc. In 1989, he practiced with Heenan Blaikie as counsel.

In 1993, he was made an Officer of the Order of Canada. In 1992, he was made a Knight of the Ordre des Arts et des Lettres. In 2004, he was inducted into the Canadian Association of Broadcasters Hall of Fame. In 2012, he was made an Officer of the National Order of Quebec. Bureau died on April 12, 2019.

Government offices
Preceded by John Meisel	Chairman of the CRTC; 1983–1989	Succeeded by Keith Spicer
