= Bernard Voyer =

- Born: March 7, 1953 (age 72); Rimouski, Quebec
- Known for: explorer and mountaineer
- Awards: Order of Canada; National Order of Quebec

Bernard Voyer, OC CQ MSM (born March 7, 1953) is a French Canadian explorer and mountaineer.

Born in Rimouski, Quebec, he has skied across Ellesmere Island; travelled to the North Pole in 1994 and South Pole in 1996; climbed Mount Everest in 1999 and Mount Fuji in 2004. He has also completed The Explorers Grand Slam.

In 1997, he was made a Knight of the National Order of Quebec. In 2001, he was made an Officer of the Order of Canada. In 2000, he was awarded the Gold Medal of the Royal Canadian Geographical Society. In 2001, he was awarded an honorary PhD in Geography from Laurentian University in Sudbury, Ontario.

== Honours ==
Ribbon bars of Hon LCol Bernard Voyer, OC, CQ, MSM

- 2015 : Meritorious Service Medal (Military Division)
- 2012 : Queen Elizabeth II Diamond Jubilee Medal
- 2008 : Honorary Lieutenant Colonel 2nd Canadian Ranger Patrol Group
- 2007 : Knight of the French Legion of Honour
- 2002 : Queen Elizabeth II Golden Jubilee Medal
- 2001 : Officier of the Order of Canada
- 1997 : Knight of the Ordre nationale du Québec
