= Marty Bergmann =

Canadian scientist

Martin Alexander Ernst "Marty" Bergmann (19 February 1956 – 20 August 2011) was a Canadian scientist and public servant. A marine biologist by training, Bergmann spent 24 years with the Canadian federal Department of Fisheries and Oceans, latterly as Director of the Centre of Expertise for Arctic Aquatic Research Excellence, before taking up the position of head of Natural Resources Canada's Polar Continental Shelf Program. During his career in the Public Service of Canada Bergmann was instrumental in greatly expanding Canada's Arctic research capabilities. He was a leading player in establishing the International Polar Year of 2007–2008, and has been called a "leading and relentless evangelist in national and international scientific circles" by the Royal Canadian Geographical Society (RCGS). He died in the crash of First Air Flight 6560 near Resolute, Nunavut, on 20 August 2011. Since his death numerous memorials have been made to Bergmann, including the naming of the Arctic Research Foundation research vessel Martin Bergmann, the establishment of the RCGS's Martin Bergmann Medal, and the naming of a 375 million year-old fossil fish species found in Nunavut, Holoptychius bergmanni, in recognition of his "scientific endeavors [that] communicated the relevance of the Arctic region to a global audience."
