= Cole Harris =

Canadian geographer (1936–2022)

Cole Harris OC FRSC
- Born: Richard Colebrook Harris; July 4, 1936; Vancouver, British Columbia
- Died: September 26, 2022 (aged 86); Vancouver, British Columbia
- Education: University of British Columbia (BA); University of Wisconsin–Madison (MSc, PhD)
- Occupations: Geographer; professor

Richard Colebrook Harris OC FRSC (July 4, 1936 – September 26, 2022), better known as Cole Harris, was a Canadian historical geographer and university professor.

== Education ==
Harris received a Bachelor of Arts degree (1958) from the University of British Columbia, followed by a Master of Science degree (1962) and a Ph.D. (1964) from the University of Wisconsin–Madison supervised by historical geographer Andrew Clark.

== Career ==
In 1964 Harris joined the University of Toronto as an assistant professor, and became an associate professor in 1971. Later that year he joined the University of British Columbia as an associate professor, and became a professor at that university in 1973.

He published books on Canadian historical geography, including "Historical Atlas of Canada, Volume 1" with maps and articles on Canada's history up to 1800.

== Personal life and death ==
Harris married Muriel Watney in 1964.

He died at home on September 26, 2022, at the age of 86. He left Muriel, their three children and their partners, and eight grandchildren.

== Awards ==
Harris was made a Fellow of the Royal Society of Canada in 1982. The Royal Canadian Geographical Society awarded Harris a Gold Medal in 1988, and awarded him the Massey Medal in 2003. Harris was made an Officer of the Order of Canada in 2004.

== Selected publications ==
- The Seigneurial System in Early Canada: A Geographical Study - 1966
- Canada Before Confederation: A Study in Historical Geography - 1974 (edited with John Warkentin)
- Letters from Windermere, 1912-1914 - 1984 ISBN 0-7748-0394-0 (edited with Elizabeth Phillips)
- Historical Atlas of Canada, vol. I: From the Beginning to 1800 - 1987
- The Resettlement of British Columbia: Essays on Colonialism and Geographical Change - 1997
- Making Native Space: Colonialism, Resistance, and Reserves in British Columbia - 2003 (nominated for the Hubert Evans Non-Fiction Prize)
- The Reluctant Land: Society, Space, and Environment in Canada before Confederation - 2009
