= Pierre Camu =

Canadian geographer (1923–2023)

- Born: March 19, 1923; Montreal, Quebec, Canada
- Died: September 5, 2023 (aged 100); Ottawa, Ontario, Canada
- Awards: Order of Canada; National Order of Quebec

Pierre Francis Camu, OC CQ MSRC (March 19, 1923 – September 5, 2023) was a Canadian geographer, civil servant, academic, and transport executive.

== Biography ==
Born in Montreal, Quebec, Camu received a Master of Arts degree in 1947 and a Ph.D. in Geography in 1951 from the Université de Montréal. From 1947 to 1949, he did his post-graduate studies at Johns Hopkins University. From 1949 to 1956, he worked with the geography branch of the Department of Mines and Technical Surveys in Ottawa. From 1956 to 1960, he was a Professor of Economic Geography at Université Laval. In 1960, he became Vice-President of the St. Lawrence Seaway Authority (now called Saint Lawrence Seaway Management Corporation) and was president from 1965 to 1973. From 1973 to 1977, he was president of the Canadian Association of Broadcasters. From 1977 to 1979, he was Chairman of the Canadian Radio-television and Telecommunications Commission (CRTC). From 1979 to 1984, he was president of March Shipping Company. From 1984 to 1988, he was a vice-president at Lavalin Inc. (now SNC Lavalin). From 1988 to 1992, he was Chairman of the Petroleum Monitoring Agency.

In 1966, he was made a Fellow of the Royal Society of Canada. In 1976, he was made an Officer of the Order of Canada. In 1998, he was made a Knight of the National Order of Quebec. In 1999, he was awarded the Camsell Medal by the Royal Canadian Geographical Society.

Camu died on September 5, 2023, at the age of 100.

== Sources ==
- Canadian Who's Who 1997 entry
- Royal Canadian Geographical Society Camsell Medal winners

Government offices
Preceded by Harry J. Boyle	Chairman of the CRTC; 1977–1979	Succeeded by John Meisel
