= Marc-André Bernier =

Canadian archaeologist

Marc-André Bernier is a Canadian archaeologist who specializes in underwater archaeology. Described as the "Indiana Jones of the deep seas" by the Toronto Star, Bernier was born in Kapuskasing, Ontario, and educated at the University of Ottawa, from which he received a BA degree in Classical Studies and a MA degree in Greek Archaeology. He also received an Education degree from Université du Québec en Abitibi-Témiscamingue. He joined the Underwater Archaeology Team of Parks Canada in 1990 and, in 2008, became its manager. He retired from Parks Canada in 2022.

In 2014, Bernier was among the four inaugural recipients of the Lawrence J. Burpee Medal of the Royal Canadian Geographical Society, presented for his work in the discovery of the wreck of HMS Erebus.
