= David Ley =

Canadian geographer

David Ley OC FRSC
- Born: Swansea, Wales
- Awards: Massey Medal (2013)

Academic background
- Education: Oxford University; Pennsylvania State University

Academic work
- Discipline: Geographer
- Institutions: University of British Columbia
- Website: http://blogs.ubc.ca/dley/

David Frederick Ley OC FRSC is a geographer and a professor emeritus at the University of British Columbia. Ley was born in Swansea, Wales, earned his B.A. at Oxford University, and his M.S. and Ph.D. at Pennsylvania State University.

== Early life and education ==
Born in Swansea, Wales, Ley attended the Windsor grammar school and then Jesus College at Oxford University, where he studied Geography and earned a bachelor's degree in 1968. During his undergraduate studies, he conducted a field study in the Weald of Sussex in southern England.

After graduation, Ley moved to the United States and studied at Pennsylvania State University. He began forming his critique of the quantitative, statistical and theoretical status quo within the field of Human Geography. He graduated with a PhD. in 1972; his doctoral dissertation, titled The Black Inner City as Frontier Outpost: Images and Behavior of a Philadelphia Neighborhood, was published in 1974 by the Association of American Geographers.

== Career ==
Following his Ph.D., Ley taught at the Department of Geography at the University of British Columbia, where he served as department head between 2009 and 2011. He was the first Co-Director of the Vancouver Centre of the Canadian Metropolis project.

In 1976, Ley and Marywan Samuals published a volume of essays entitled Humanistic Geography.

Ley’s 1990s book The New Middle Class and the Remaking of the Central City, described patterns of urban gentrification in six Canadian cities outlines a demand-side explanation to gentrification, as opposed to Smith’s Marxist supply-side hypothesis.

His later book titled Millionaire Migrants: Trans-Pacific Life Lines looks at wealthy east Asian immigration, and the effects these migrants have had on the cultural and economical landscape of North American, Australian and New Zealand cities.

He has argued that Vancouver has an over-supply of housing and that more housing will contribute to gentrification and higher housing costs. He has blamed Vancouver's housing crisis on immigration and real estate speculation by foreigners.

== Recognition ==
- Fellow of Royal Society of Canada.
- Canada Research Chair in Urbanization and Cultural Diversity.
- Pierre Trudeau Fellow 2003.
- Lifetime Achievement Award by the Association of American Geographers in 2009.
- Massey Medal 2013
- Order of Canada (Officer) 2022

== Bibliography ==
=== Books ===
- Ley, D., in preparation. Millionaire Migrants: Trans-Pacific Life Lines.
- Ley, David (1996). The New Middle Class and the Remaking of the Central City. Oxford University Press. ISBN 978-0-19-823292-6.
- Hasson, S. and D. Ley, 1994. Neighbourhood Organisations and the Welfare State. Toronto: University of Toronto Press, 387 pp.
- Duncan, J. and D. Ley (eds.), 1993. Place/Culture/Representation. London and New York: Routledge, 341 pp.
- Bourne, L. and D. Ley (eds.), 1993. The Changing Social Geography of Canadian Cities. Montreal: McGill-Queens Press, 487 pp.
- Clarke, C., D. Ley and C. Peach (eds.), 1984. Geography and Ethnic Pluralism. London and Boston: Allen and Unwin, 294 pp. (Spanish edition, 1987).
- Ley, D., 1983. A Social Geography of the City. New York and London: Harper and Row, 449 pp.
- Ley, D. and M. Samuels (eds.), 1978. Humanistic Geography. Chicago: Maaroufa/Methuen, London: Croom Helm, 337 pp.
- Ley, D. (ed.), 1974. Community Participation and the Spatial Order of the City. Vancouver, BC: Tantalus Publications, 126 pp.
- Ley, D., 1974. The Black Inner City as Frontier Outpost: Images and Behaviour of a Philadelphia Neighbourhood. Washington, DC: Association of American Geographers, Monograph Series No. 7, 282 pp.

== See also ==
- Social geography
- Human geography
- Urban geography
