= Skene Bay =

Bay in Nunavut, Canada

- Location within Nunavut
- Location: Viscount Melville Sound
- Coordinates: 75°00′N 107°50′W
- Ocean/sea sources: Arctic Ocean
- Basin countries: Canada
- Settlements: Uninhabited

Skene Bay is an Arctic waterway in the Qikiqtaaluk Region, Nunavut, Canada. Located off southern Melville Island, the bay is an arm of Viscount Melville Sound.

It is named after Lieutenant Edward Monte Skene who served on Arctic expeditions with Sir John Ross in 1818, and with Sir William Edward Parry in 1819.
