= Graham Westbrook Rowley =

British-Canadian Arctic explorer (1912–2003)

Graham Rowley
- Graham Rowley at Pond Inlet, Nunavut one the founders of the Arctic Circle. This photo was taken during the British-Canadian Arctic Expedition of 1936-39
- Born: Graham Westbrook Rowley; 31 October 1912; Manchester, England
- Died: 31 December 2003 (aged 91); Ottawa, Canada
- Monuments: Rowley Island, Foxe Bain Rowley River, Baffin Island
- Education: University of Cambridge
- Notable work: Cold Comfort
- Spouse: Diana May (Mary) Rustat Crowfoot Rowley (m. 1944; d. 2018)
- Children: Anne, Susan and Jane

Graham Westbrook Rowley CM MBE (October 31, 1912 – December 31, 2003) was an Arctic explorer, hailed as "one of the last true explorers of North America" (The Telegraph).

== Early life and family ==
Rowley was born on October 31, 1912, in Manchester, England.

Born the youngest of four children, Rowley developed a playful and ambitious disposition that later proved well suited to the demands of his career.

He met his wife Diana at the Royal Geographical Society in Cambridge, where she was a student editor, and after many failed accounts on asking her to go out on a date with him, she finally gave in and they were inseparable from that day forth.

They married twice, once in 1944 (a civil wedding before he left for the army) and again in 1945 in a Church setting.

Together they had three healthy daughters: Anne, Sue (Susan) and Jane.

Rowley and Diana were married for 69 years, and shared their passions for the Arctic together.

== Education ==
He attended Clare College, Cambridge, and received his B.A. from the University of Cambridge in 1934 and his M.A. from the same institution in 1936.

== Career ==
From 1936 to 1939, Rowley engaged in an archaeological excavation in the Eastern Canadian Arctic. During this time, he discovered new islands in Fox Basin, carried out the original exploration of the Baffin Island coast, crossed Baffin Island by a new route, and excavated the first major site in Dorset culture. Because of his work with the Inuit and Dorset peoples, Rowley had a large island and river in the Arctic named after him.

He served in the Canadian Army in World War II and received the Member of the Order of the British Empire in 1945.

A Fellow of the Royal Canadian Geographical Society, Rowley was awarded the Society's prestigious Massey Medal in 1963 for his geographical work.

As a scientist with the Department of Indian Affairs and Northern Development in the early 1970s, he created a training program for Northern scientists and developed ground and air support services for scientific groups working in the Arctic.

He was made an honorary member of the American Polar Society in 1985, due to his countless advancements and discoveries in the field.

In 1947, Graham and Diana Rowley, Tom and Jackie Manning and several associates formed a club in Ottawa called The Arctic Circle, to enable those interested in the Arctic to meet for informal discussion and to keep club members informed of current happenings in the Arctic. The Arctic Circle is still active.

He died in Ottawa, Ontario, Canada on December 31, 2003, surrounded by his wife, daughters and grandchildren.

== Publications ==
- Cold Comfort: My Love Affair with the Arctic (1996)

== See also ==
- John Winter Crowfoot
