= Canadian Association of Geographers =

Educational and scientific society in Canada

- Formation: May 30, 1951
- Headquarters: University of Ottawa, Ottawa, Ontario, Canada
- President: Neil Hanlon
- Website: cag-acg.ca

The Canadian Association of Geographers (CAG; French: L'Association canadienne des géographes) is an educational and scientific society in Canada aimed at advancing the understanding of, study of, and importance of geography and related fields. CAG publishes the quarterly peer-reviewed journal The Canadian Geographer.

The association was founded on May 30, 1951, at McGill University in Montreal, Quebec, with James Wreford Watson as the organization's first president. The first national meeting of CAG members took place in 1952 at the Université Laval in Quebec City. CAG's 1996 national meeting was held in Saskatoon as a joint meeting with the Geomorphological Research Group of the Canadian Federation of Earth Sciences.

As of 2016, the CAG society has over 1,000 members including academics, public and private sector workers, and students. Its offices are at the Department of Geography, Environment and Geomatics, University of Ottawa.

== Divisions ==
The CAG is structured into five divisions: the Atlantic Division (ACAG) encompasses members in Newfoundland and Labrador, Prince Edward Island, New Brunswick, Nova Scotia; the Ontario Division (CAGONT) encompasses members in Ontario; the Prairie Division (PCAG) encompasses members in Manitoba, Saskatchewan, and Nunavut as well as members affiliated with Lakehead University in northern Ontario; the Quebec Division (RGQ) encompasses members in Quebec; and the Western Division (WDCAG) encompasses members in Alberta, British Columbia, the Northwest Territories, and Yukon.

Academics from some US states are represented in certain divisions, with those divisions sometimes holding their annual meetings at American institutions. WDCAG includes members from Washington, Oregon, Idaho, and Montana; and PCAG includes members from North Dakota.

== Awards ==
The association presents several awards for outstanding service. These include:

- Award For Scholarly Distinction In Geography
- Award for Geography in the Service of Government or Business
- Award for Service to the Profession of Geography
- Award for Excellence in Teaching Geography
- The Julian M. Szeicz Award for Early Career Achievement
- The Robin P. Armstrong Memorial Prize for Excellence in Native Studies

== See also ==
- Royal Canadian Geographical Society
