= Marc-André Bédard (biathlete) =

Canadian biathlete

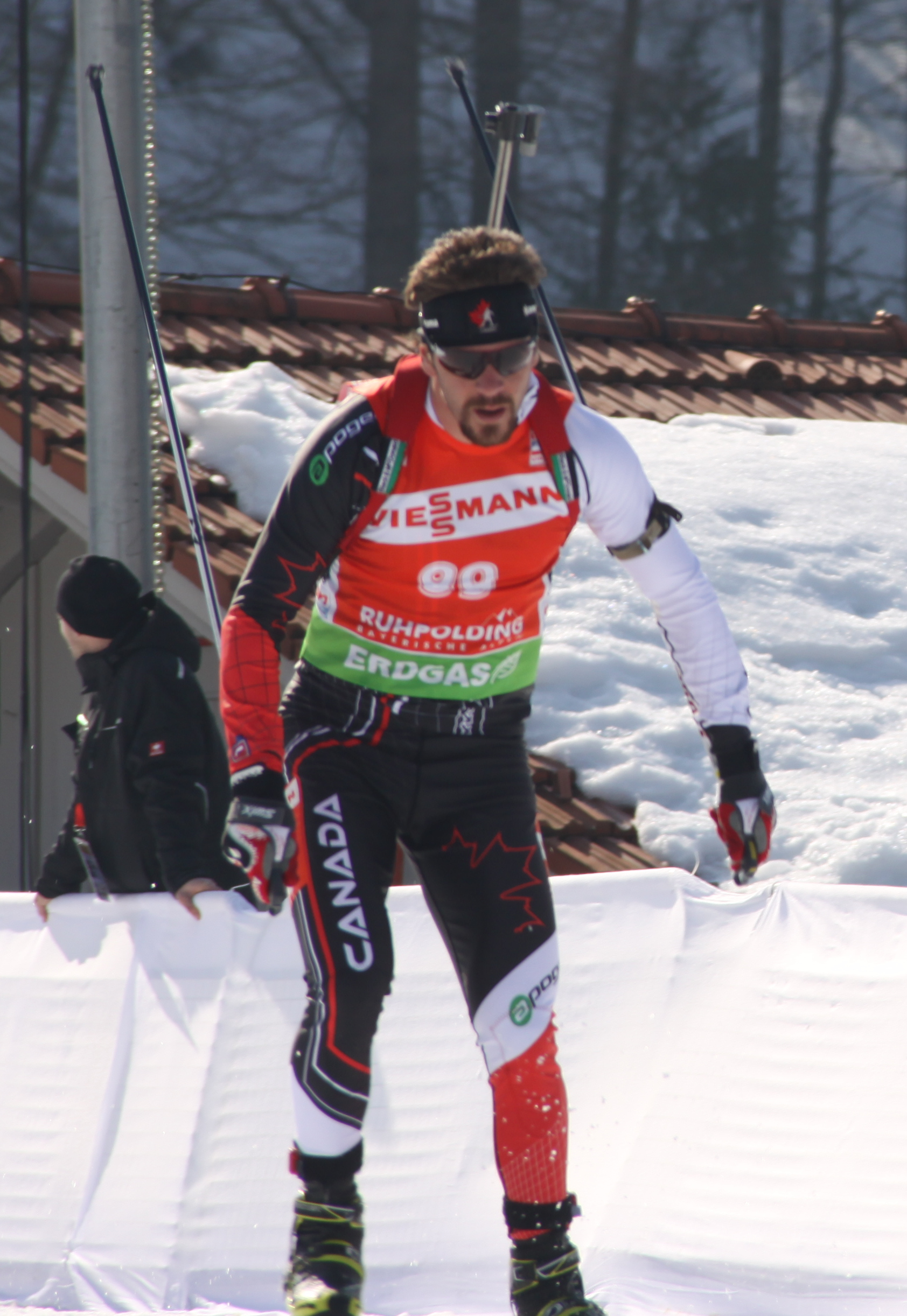

Personal information
- Nationality: Canadian
- Born: 19 February 1986 (age 40)

Sport
- Sport: Biathlon
Medal record
Men's biathlon
Representing Canada
Youth World Championships
Silver medal – second place	2004 Haute Maurienne	3 × 7.5 km relay
Silver medal – second place	2005 Kontiolahti	3 × 7.5 km relay
Junior World Championships
Bronze medal – third place	2007 Martell	4 × 7.5 km relay

Marc-André Bedard (born February 19, 1986) is a Canadian biathlete. Bédard was born in Saint-Gabriel-de-Valcartier, Québec and started cross-country skiing as a child. At the age of fourteen he changed to biathlon. His role-model is Olympic gold medalist Myriam Bédard. In an interview he once stated, that it was his dream to finish as the winner in an Olympic race like she had in the 1994 Winter Olympics, in Lillehammer, Norway.

Since 2004 he has started in European races regularly. He competes in the European Cup and in European continental championships. His first appearance was in a relay event, the first race as a single starter was in 2006. Still in cadet's age he also competed at the Junior World Championships in 2004, 2005 and 2007, winning two silver and a bronze medal with the Canadian relay team with teammates Jean-Philippe Leguellec and François Leboeuf as well as Maxime Leboeuf, Brendan Green and Yannick Letailleur respectively. He became Canadian champion in the sprint competition 2004 through 2006, and finished among the top three in almost every other Canadian championship race. In 2006 Bédard finished third in the North-American championships in the pursuit event.

His first win was in a European Cup race which came on March 12, 2008 when he finished the sprint event in first place. The base for the win was laid in the shooting range clearing all targets. He became only the third Canadian biathlete to win an international competition after Olympic and world champion Myriam Bédard and Sandra Keith, who had won a European Cup race earlier in 2003. He competed at the 2010 Winter Olympics.
