= Géographica =

- Founded: 1997
- Company: Royal Canadian Geographical Society
- Country: Canada
- Language: French
- Website: geographica.ca

Géographica is the French-language magazine of the Royal Canadian Geographical Society (RCGS), published under the Society's French name, the Société géographique royale du Canada (SGRC). Introduced in 1997, Géographica is not a stand-alone publication, but is published as an irregular supplement to La Presse. It was formerly quarterly supplement to L'actualité.

The English-language sister publication is Canadian Geographic.
