= Royal Canadian Geographical Society =

Canadian nonprofit educational organization

- Formation: 1929
- Type: Learned society
- Headquarters: 50 Sussex Drive
- Location: Ottawa, Ontario
- President: The Hon. Lois Mitchell
- Chief Executive Officer: John G. Geiger
- Main organ: College of Fellows
- Website: rcgs.org

The Royal Canadian Geographical Society (RCGS; French: Société géographique royale du Canada) is a Canadian nonprofit educational organization. It has dedicated itself to spreading a broader knowledge and deeper appreciation of Canada, including its people, places, natural and cultural heritage, as well as its environmental, social and economic challenges.

== History ==
The Royal Canadian Geographical Society was founded in 1929 by a group of eminent Canadians, including Marius Barbeau, an ethnographer and folklorist who is today considered a founder of Canadian anthropology, the Hon. A.E. Arsenault, Premier of Prince Edward Island and justice of the province's supreme court, Lawrence J. Burpee, Secretary for Canada of the International Joint Commission, John Wesley Dafoe, managing editor of the Winnipeg Free Press, the Hon. Albert Hudson, a justice of the Supreme Court of Canada, and Dr. O.D. Skelton, Under-Secretary of State for External Affairs.

The Rt. Hon. Viscount Willingdon, Governor-General of Canada, was the founding patron. J.B. Joseph Tyrrell, a geologist and cartographer whose exploits included the discovery of Albertosaurus bones in Alberta's Badlands, and making first contact with the Ihalmiut ("People from Beyond") of the Keewatin district of Canada's Northwest Territories, served as founding Honorary President. Arthur Philemon Coleman, a geologist and explorer who between 1884 and 1908 made eight trips of discovery to the Canadian Rockies, was named Honorary Vice-president.

At its first meeting, Charles Camsell said the society was formed "purely for patriotic purposes", and he hoped it would "be a unifying influence upon the life of Canada." A report by the acting secretary, E.S. Martindale, stated the intention of the founders: "The work of making the resources and other geographic factors of each part of the Dominion more widely known and more clearly understood is one of the best educational services that can be undertaken—and one that cannot be rendered except through a geographic organization animated by a broad national purpose."

Among those who have addressed meetings of the RCGS over the years are Sir Francis Younghusband, Sir Hubert Wilkins, Maj. L.T. Burwash, Dr. Isaiah Bowman, Dr. Wade Davis, Sir Michael Palin, Dr. Phil Currie, and Sir Christopher Ondaatje.

The RCGS publishes an award-winning English-language magazine, Canadian Geographic, which has been published continuously since 1930 (then called Canadian Geographical Journal). The society also publishes Canadian Geographic Travel quarterly. The society's French-language magazine, Géographica, which is published in collaboration with La Presse, was introduced in 1997.

Alan Beddoe designed the coat of arms for the Royal Canadian Geographical Society, and his fonds includes a black and white photograph of the letters patent.

In October 2016, it was announced that the society's new home would be an "iconic" building at 50 Sussex Drive in Ottawa. The society moved into its new headquarters in Spring 2018, and it debuted two exhibitions – Explore by Chris Cran and Lessons From the Arctic: How Roald Amundsen Won the Race to the South Pole.

In May 2019, the prime minister of Canada, Justin Trudeau, attended the official opening ceremony of the Royal Canadian Geographical Society's headquarters at 50 Sussex Drive.

== Programs ==
The Royal Canadian Geographical Society helps fund education, expeditions, research and lectures programs. Notably, it was a partner in the 2014 Victoria Strait Expedition that located HMS Erebus, one of two exploration vessels lost on the British Arctic Expedition led by Sir John Franklin.

Each fall, the society hosts the annual College of Fellows Annual Dinner, with notable past speakers include Sir Francis Younghusband, Major General Sir James Howden MacBrien, Jeopardy! host Alex Trebek, artist Robert Bateman, actor Dan Aykroyd, ethnobotanist Wade Davis, Climate Canada's senior climatologist David Phillips, storm chaser George Kourounis, and award-winning author Margaret Atwood. In addition, the dinner has been attended by both Prime Minister Stephen Harper and Governor General David Johnston in the past.

In June 2017, it was granted $2,084,000 in funding from the Government of Canada to develop the educational resource, a portion of which was drawn from the Canada 150 fund. This resulted in the creation of the Indigenous Peoples Atlas of Canada, developed with input from a number of groups and organizations representing indigenous peoples in Canada, including the Assembly of First Nations, Indspire, Inuit Tapiriit Kanatami, the Métis National Council, and the National Centre for Truth and Reconciliation. An issue of each of Canadian Geographic and Géographica were dedicated to the project.

== College of Fellows ==
The society's board of governors and its program committees are made up entirely of volunteers, who are members of the College of Fellows. Traditionally, Fellows were elected "in recognition of outstanding service to Canada." Fellows are entitled to use the post-nominal letters FRCGS (Fellow of the Royal Canadian Geographical Society).

Past Fellows of the society include eminent names such as:

- painter A.Y. Jackson,
- explorer Vilhjalmur Stefansson,
- mariner and explorer Capt. Joseph-Elzéar Bernier,
- journalist Agnes C. Laut,
- American businessman and explorer Fenley Hunter,
- Nobel Prize recipient Prof. F.G. Banting,
- Edward Shackleton, Baron Shackleton, geographer and son of Sir Ernest Shackleton,
- composer Sir Ernest MacMillan,
- broadcaster and traveller Lowell Thomas,
- businessman James Armstrong Richardson Sr.,
- Saskatchewan Premier T.C. Tommy Douglas,
- explorer Henry Larsen,
- historian L'abbé Arthur Maheux
- anthropologist Diamond Jenness,
- businessman E.P. Taylor,
- Canadian prime ministers R.B. Bennett, Louis St. Laurent, and Lester B. Pearson,
- hotelier Conrad Hilton,
- former Conservative leader and Nova Scotia premier Robert Stanfield,
- and geographer and GIS originator Roger Tomlinson.

Current Fellows include:

- Gilbert M. Grosvenor, of the National Geographic Society,
- ethnobotanist Wade Davis,
- astronauts Steve MacLean, Jeremy Hansen and Jerry M. Linenger,
- and businessman and author Sir Christopher Ondaatje.

Besides regular Fellows, the society elects Honorary Fellows, people recognized for special or outstanding achievements. The president, and other members of the executive, are elected by the College of Fellows at the society's annual general meeting.

Honorary Fellows include:

- Myrna Pearman, Canadian naturalist and author.

== Organization ==
The Governor General of Canada serves as the patron of the society. The society has honorary officers, including honorary presidents and honorary vice-presidents. A volunteer Board of governors, chaired by the president of the board, and an executive committee, provide general oversight.

Day-to-day operations of the society, its programs and business, are provided by its chief executive officer, currently John G. Geiger. The CEO is also responsible for strategic leadership, in consultation with the board of governors.

=== Presidents ===
- 1930–1941: Dr. Charles Camsell, geologist in charge of explorations for the Geological Survey of Canada, and commissioner of the Northwest Territories. Oversaw the exploration of the uncharted parts of Canada's North—a vast area covering 1.4 million square kilometres or about 25 percent of the country.
- 1941–1944: Dr. George J. Desbarats, Deputy Minister of Marine and Fisheries and of National Defence. He was the Canadian official who first learned that explorer Vilhjalmur Stefansson was separated from his ship, and that the Karluk was missing in the Arctic ice.
- 1944–1950: Mr. Charles C. Cowan, vice president and managing director, British American Bank Note Co.; Dir., National Film Board
- 1950–1955: Air Marshal Robert Leckie, an aviation pioneer and Chief of the Air Staff for the Royal Canadian Air Force. An outstanding fighter pilot during the First World War, he flew attacks on German Zeppelins, and downed two.
- 1955–1963: Maj.-Gen. Hugh A. Young, commanded the 6th Canadian Infantry Brigade at Normandy, and served as Deputy Minister of Public Works. Commissioner of the Northwest Territories from 1950 to 1953. As head of the advisory committee on Northern Development, in 1953 he studied threats to Canadian sovereignty in the Arctic.
- 1963–1967: Dr. Omond Solandt, scientist and first chairman of both Canada's Defence Research Board and the Science Council of Canada. He was a scientific advisor to Lord Louis Mountbatten, the last Viceroy of India, and later a member of the joint military mission sent to Japan to evaluate the effects of the atomic bomb. He served as Chancellor of the University of Toronto.
- 1967–1977: Dr. Pierre Camu, geographer and civil servant. Served as president of the St. Lawrence Seaway Authority, and later as chair of the Canadian Radio-television and Telecommunications Commission (CRTC). He is co-founder of the Trans Canada Trail.
- 1977–1986: Mr. Denis Coolican, served as president of the Canadian Bank Note Company and the first Chair of the Regional Municipality of Ottawa-Carleton. He was also a Vice President of Brascan.
- 1986–1992: Dr. Alexander T. Davidson, geographer and civil servant. Served as chief of resources for the federal Department of Northern Affairs, and assistant deputy minister of rural development; water; policy, planning and research for Environment Canada; and Parks Canada. He also was chairman of the federal Panel Concerning Low Level Military Flights in Labrador-Goose Bay.
- 1992–1998: Dr. Denis A. St-Onge, geoscientist with the Geological Survey of Canada. Conducted pioneering research into the evolution of landscape under extreme cold climate on Ellef Ringnes Island in the High Arctic. He is credited with developing a unique method of mapping geomorphology.
- 1998–2004: Dr. Arthur E. Collin, served as Scientific Advisor for the Maritime Forces (1965) and as the Dominion Hydrographer (1968). From 1971 to 1980 he served as Assistant Deputy Minister of Fisheries and Oceans and the Environment.
- 2004–2010: Ms. Gisèle Jacob, director general with Environment Canada and Deputy Secretary General for the Canadian Human Rights Commission. She also served as chair of the Geographical Names Board of Canada.
- 2010–2013: Mr. John G. Geiger, author of Frozen In Time: The Fate of The Franklin Expedition and other books, former head of the editorial board of The Globe and Mail, current chief executive officer of the RCGS.
- 2013–2016: Dr. Paul Ruest, former president of the Université de Saint-Boniface.
- 2016–2023: Mr. Gavin Fitch, KC, lawyer.
- 2023–present: The Hon. Lois Mitchell, businesswoman and former Lieutenant Governor of Alberta.

=== Notable Vice-Presidents ===
- 1930–1934: J. Mackintosh Bell, geologist, explorer and writer. His field work included pioneer exploration in Arctic Canada for the Geological Survey of Canada. He later became director of the Geological Survey of New Zealand.
- 1939–1941: Senator W. A. Buchanan, former Member of Parliament and publisher of the Lethbridge Herald.
- 1939–1954: Gen. A.G.L. Andrew McNaughton, Chief of the General Staff for Canada, commanding officer of the First Canadian Infantry Division, First Canadian Corps, First Canadian Army, Minister of National Defence, and Ambassador to the United Nations.
- 1968–Dr. John Tuzo Wilson, geophysicist and geologist who achieved worldwide acclaim for his contributions to the theory of plate tectonics.
- 1988–2000: Ernest Côté, soldier, diplomat, and senior civil servant.

== Awards ==
=== Gold Medal ===
Recognizing a particular achievement by one or more individuals in the general field of geography or a significant national or international event. It was first awarded in 1972.

Source: RCGS

- 2026: Stephen Harper
- 2019: Richard Boudreault, Adrienne Clarkson and Dr. Jane Goodall
- 2018: Trans Canada Trail, Perry Bellegarde, Clément Chartier, Natan Obed, Ry Moran and Roberta Jamieson
- 2017: Sir David Attenborough, Gordon Lightfoot (singer/songwriter) and John Turner (Prime Minister)
- 2016: Marc R. St-Onge, Paul F. Hoffman, Denis St-Onge and the Geological Survey of Canada
- 2015: Jacob Verhoef, Graeme Gibson and Margaret Atwood
- 2014: Canada's Astronauts, including Roberta Bondar, David Saint-Jacques, Marc Garneau, Steve MacLean, Dafydd Rhys "Dave" Williams, Robert Thirsk, Jeremy Hansen, Bjarni Tryggvason and the Canadian Space Agency
- 2013: Michael Palin, Robert Bateman, and Yvan Desy and Sylvain Lemay of Natural Resources Canada
- 2012: Dr. Philip Currie
- 2011: Sir Christopher Ondaatje and Dr. Jerry Linenger
- 2010: Alex Trebek and Canadian International Polar Year National Committee
- 2009: Dr. Wade Davis
- 2007: The Nature of Québec/Le Québec au naturel
- 2006: The Atlas of Canada
- 2004: Jean Lemire and Edryd Shaw
- 2003: Roger F. Tomlinson
- 2002: Gordon Slade
- 2001: Norman Hallendy
- 2000: Bernard Voyer
- 1998: Mary Simon
- 1997: Peter Gzowski
- 1996: Gilbert M. Grosvenor
- 1995: Harold K. Eidsvik, Dr. Lawrence W. Morley and Dr. Victor K. Prest
- 1994: The Historical Atlas of Canada, volumes II and III
- 1988: The Historical Atlas of Canada, Volume I, William G. Dean, Richard Colebrook Harris, and Geoffrey J. Matthews
- 1986: Dr. Derek C. Ford
- 1980: Selma Barkham
- 1978: Dr. J. Tuzo Wilson
- 1976: National Atlas of Canada
- 1973: Maj. Gen. William J. Megill
- 1972: Dr. Stanislaw Lesczychki

=== Sir Christopher Ondaatje Medal for Exploration ===
The Sir Christopher Ondaatje Medal for Exploration, named after gold medal and Camsell Medal recipient Sir Christopher Ondaatje, was established in 2013.

Source: RCGS

- 2024: Karsten Heuer / Leanne Allison
- 2023: Ray Zahab
- 2022: John Baldwin
- 2021: Jacqueline Windh
- 2020: David Jones
- 2019: Charles “Chas” Yonge
- 2018: Chic Scott
- 2017: Pat and Baiba Morrow, and Wade Davis
- 2016: Richard Weber
- 2015: Jean Lemire
- 2014: George Hobson
- 2013: Jill Heinerth

=== 3M Environmental Innovation Award ===
The 3M Environmental Innovation Award was established in 2009 by the Society and 3M Canada to recognize outstanding individuals in business, government, academia or community organizations whose innovative contributions to environmental change are benefiting Canada and Canadians. The award was discontinued, with the final recipient named in 2015.

Source: RCGS

- 2015: GreenBug Energy Inc.
- 2014: Ross Thurston
- 2013: Jeff Golfman
- 2012: Dr. Fraser Taylor
- 2011: Michel Séguin
- 2010: Frank van Biesen
- 2009: Sidney Ribaux

=== Camsell Medal ===
The Royal Canadian Geographical Society awards the Camsell Medal to bestow recognition upon, and to express the society's appreciation to, individuals who have given outstanding service to the society. The award was established by the society's board of governors in 1992.

Source: RCGS

- 2025: Paul VanZant and John Pollack
- 2024: Sandra Smith
- 2023: Mary Jane Starr and Anthony Hendrie
- 2022: Lynn Moorman and Gavin Fitch
- 2021: Alison Gill and Susan Taylor
- 2020: Keith Exelby
- 2019: Beth Dye and Joe Frey
- 2018: Paul Ruest and Élisabeth Nadeau
- 2017: Jody Decker and Philip Howarth
- 2016: Mark Graham, Peter Harrison and Christine Duverger-Harrison
- 2015: Bruce Amos and Louise Maffett
- 2014: Christopher Burn and Iain Wallace
- 2013: Sir Christopher Ondaatje
- 2012: Jean Fournier
- 2011: Gisèle Jacob and Arthur E. Collin
- 2010: Pierre Bergeron and Helen Kerfoot
- 2009: James Raffan and Ted Johnson
- 2008: Kenneth Boland and Carman Joynt
- 2007: Stuart Semple and Brian Osborne
- 2006: Karen Lochhead and Michael Schmidt
- 2005: James Maxwell and Denis St-Onge
- 2004: Samuel P. Arsenault and Alexander T. Davidson
- 2003: J. Blair Seaborn and David Kirkwood
- 2002: Alan O. Gibbons
- 2001: Dickson Mansfield
- 2000: Winifred Wadasinghe-Wijay
- 1999: Pierre Camu and Grete Hale
- 1998: Pierre Des Marais II and Dr. George Hobson
- 1997: Enid Byford and Robert Goddard
- 1996: David Bartlett
- 1995: William M. Gilchrist and Col. Louis M. Sebert
- 1994: Wendy Simpson-Lewis
- 1993: David W. Phillips and Dr. Ernest P. Weeks
- 1992: Dr. J. Keith Fraser and Samuel F. Hughes

=== The Martin Bergmann Medal for Excellence in Arctic Leadership and Science ===
Established by the Royal Canadian Geographical Society in 2012, the medal recognizes achievement for "excellence in Arctic leadership and science." It is named in honour of Martin "Marty" Bergmann, a public servant.

Source: RCGS

- 2019: Wayne Pollard
- 2018: James Drummond and Derek Muir
- 2017: Martin Fortier
- 2016: Warwick Vincent
- 2015: John Smol
- 2014: Donald Forbes
- 2013: David Hik
- 2012: Martin Bergmann

=== Lawrence J. Burpee Medal ===
Established by the society in 2013, this medal is awarded to recognize outstanding contribution to the general advancement of geography, or to other achievement that greatly enhances the ability of the society to fulfill its mission.

Source: RCGS

- 2020: Bryan Adams and Jan Morris
- 2019: Anne Innis Dagg
- 2018: Chris Cran, André Préfontaine and Peter Suedfeld
- 2017: President Jimmy Carter and Andrew Prossin
- 2016: Simon Winchester
- 2015: Louie Kamookak, Wendy Cecil and Alex Trebek
- 2014: Marc-André Bernier, Ryan Harris, Jonathan Moore and Andrew Campbell (Parks Canada)

=== Massey Medal ===
The Massey Medal recognizes outstanding personal achievement in the exploration, development or description of the geography of Canada. The award was established in 1959 by the Massey Foundation, named for industrialist Hart Massey.

Source: RCGS

- 2021 - Yvan Bédard and Barbara Sherwood Lollar
- 2020 - John Smol
- 2019 - Derek Clifford Ford
- 2018: Arthur J. Ray
- 2017: David Morrison
- 2016: Steve Blasco
- 2015: Brian Osborne
- 2014: Derald Smith
- 2013: David Ley
- 2012: Graeme Wynn
- 2011: David Livingstone
- 2010: Raymond Price
- 2009: Michael Church
- 2008: Bruce Mitchell
- 2007: Eddy Carmack
- 2006: Serge Courville
- 2005: Tim Oke
- 2004: Larry Stuart Bourne
- 2003: Richard Colebrook Harris
- 2002: John Oliver Wheeler
- 2001: Lawrence McCann
- 1999: Alexander T. Davidson
- 1998: William C. Wonders
- 1997: James A. Houston
- 1996: James P. Bruce
- 1995: Pierre Camu

=== Innovation in Geography Teaching Award ===
Established in 2013, the Innovation in Geography Teaching Award is presented to K-12 teachers who have "gone above and beyond their job description to further geographic literacy." Recipients are chosen by the board of Canadian Geographic Education.

Source: RCGS

- 2018: Breanna Heels
- 2017: Paula Huddy-Zubkowski
- 2016: Greg Neil
- 2015: Janet Ruest
- 2014: Mike Farley
- 2013: Andrew Young

=== Louie Kamookak Medal ===
Established in 2018, the medal is named for Louie Kamookak, an Inuk historian involved in the search for Franklin's lost expedition, and is awarded for those who have "been brought to the attention of the Executive Committee, Awards Committee, or to the CEO, as having made Canada’s geography better known to Canadians and to the world".

Source: RCGS

- 2020: Nellie Kusugak, Elizabeth Dowdeswell
- 2019: George Jacob
- 2018: Gregory Copley, Jared Harris, Josephine Kamookak, Anne Kari Hansen Ovind, Michael Palin, Kim Wallace

== Canadian Geographic Education ==
Canadian Geographic Education—formerly the Canadian Council for Geographic Education (CCGE)—is a joint initiative of the Royal Canadian Geographical Society and the National Geographic Society of Washington, D.C., established in 1993. The programs of the Can Geo Education aim to strengthen geographic education in the classroom. In addition to increasing the emphasis on geography within the school system, the Can Geo Education endeavours to increase the public awareness of the importance of geographical literacy.

== Arms ==
Coat of arms of Royal Canadian Geographical Society

Notes
Granted 11 June 1991.
Crest
In front of a Canada goose wings elevated and displayed the northern hemisphere of a terrestrial globe all Proper.
Escutcheon
Azure an annulet Or surmounted of a compass rose of eight points Argent charged in the centre with a maple leaf slipped Gules on a canton also Argent a representation of the Royal Crown Proper.
Supporters
On a grassy mound on either side a malamute sled-dog Proper.

== See also ==
- Canadian Association of Geographers
- List of Canadian organizations with royal patronage
- List of environmental awards
- List of geography awards
