= Canadian Geographic =

Canadian magazine

- Publisher: Nathalie Cuerrier
- Total circulation: 147,252
- Founded: 1930
- First issue: May 1930
- Company: Royal Canadian Geographical Society
- Country: Canada
- Based in: Ottawa
- Language: English
- Website: canadiangeographic.ca
- ISSN: 0706-2168

Canadian Geographic is a magazine published by the Royal Canadian Geographical Society, (RCGS) based in Ottawa, Ontario.

== History and profile ==
After the Society was founded in 1929, the magazine was established the next year in May 1930 under the name Canadian Geographical Journal. The Society's objective was to produce a popular magazine primarily focusing on Canadian geography. The first editor was Charles Camsell, since 1915 a fellow of the British Royal Geographical Society, as well as a geologist who had been responsible for mapping large parts of Northern Ontario, Manitoba and the Yukon. Originally published out of Montreal, Quebec, the magazine is now headquartered in Ottawa, Ontario. The magazine adopted its current title in 1978.

Typically the magazine contains articles on physical, historical, political and environmental geography, illustrated with photographs, illustrations and maps. Controversial subjects such as acid rain, clear-cut logging, vanishing wetlands, the pollution of the Great Lakes and energy sources of Canadians have also been covered in print and online. The magazine's website contains substantial extracts from current articles and supplementary information not published in the print edition, and a digital edition is also produced for each issue.

In addition to the Canadian Geographic title, the RCGS also publishes Géographica, its French companion, and Canadian Geographic Travel, which concentrates on travel topics,

== Canadian Environment Awards ==
In 2002, the magazine established the Canadian Environment Awards program in partnership with the government and private companies. This award was replaced by the 3M Environmental Innovation Award in 2009.

== Controversy ==
In 2015, the magazine was criticized for allowing its editorial policy to be influenced by its sponsors. In a 2012 issue about the Calgary Stampede, journalist Jesse Brown wrote about improper treatment of horses by the Stampede. The article he filed was later edited to remove any reference to "horse culls". The magazine also distributed free educational resource material to schools across the country that discussed the Alberta Oil Sands. While Canadian Geographic maintained that the material was independent of influence, it was later revealed that some of the content came from the Canadian Association of Petroleum Producers, an industrial lobby group.

In March 2018, in light of the American magazine National Geographic, performing a public mea culpa for its history of racist depictions, the editorship of Canadian Geographic publicly announced that it would be performing a similar historical review of its published content to see if it has had similar problems.
