= 2022 in Canada =

- Decades: 2000s; 2010s; 2020s
- See also: History of Canada; Timeline of Canadian history; List of years in Canada

Events from the year 2022 in Canada.

== Incumbents ==
=== The Crown ===
- Monarch – Elizabeth II (until September 8), then Charles III

=== Federal government ===
- Governor General – Mary Simon
- Prime Minister – Justin Trudeau
- Parliament – 44th

=== Provincial governments ===
==== Lieutenant Governors ====
- Lieutenant Governor of Alberta – Salma Lakhani
- Lieutenant Governor of British Columbia – Janet Austin
- Lieutenant Governor of Manitoba – Janice Filmon (until October 24); then Anita Neville
- Lieutenant Governor of New Brunswick – Brenda Murphy
- Lieutenant Governor of Newfoundland and Labrador – Judy Foote
- Lieutenant Governor of Nova Scotia – Arthur LeBlanc
- Lieutenant Governor of Ontario – Elizabeth Dowdeswell
- Lieutenant Governor of Prince Edward Island – Antoinette Perry
- Lieutenant Governor of Quebec – J. Michel Doyon
- Lieutenant Governor of Saskatchewan – Russell Mirasty

==== Premiers ====
- Premier of Alberta – Jason Kenney (until October 11); then Danielle Smith
- Premier of British Columbia – John Horgan (until November 18); then David Eby
- Premier of Manitoba – Heather Stefanson
- Premier of New Brunswick – Blaine Higgs
- Premier of Newfoundland and Labrador – Andrew Furey
- Premier of Nova Scotia – Tim Houston
- Premier of Ontario – Doug Ford
- Premier of Prince Edward Island – Dennis King
- Premier of Quebec – François Legault
- Premier of Saskatchewan – Scott Moe

=== Territorial governments ===
==== Commissioners ====
- Commissioner of Northwest Territories – Margaret Thom
- Commissioner of Nunavut – Eva Aariak
- Commissioner of Yukon – Angélique Bernard

==== Premiers ====
- Premier of Northwest Territories – Caroline Cochrane
- Premier of Nunavut – P. J. Akeeagok
- Premier of Yukon – Sandy Silver

== Events ==
=== January ===
- January 3–9 – The 2022 Alberta Scotties Tournament of Hearts and 2022 Boston Pizza Cup are held in Grande Prairie, Alberta, with Laura Walker winning the former and Kevin Koe winning the latter.
- January 3 – An official death toll from COVID-19 in Canada exceeds 30,000 people.
- January 5–9 – The 2022 Saskatchewan Scotties Tournament of Hearts is held in Assiniboia, Saskatchewan, with Penny Barker winning the competition.
- January 7 – Conversion therapy becomes illegal in the country.
- January 10 – The number of daily COVID-19 infections in Canada exceeds 55,350 people for the first time since the pandemic begin, fueled by highly transmissible Deltacron hybrid variant.
- January 13 – An explosion kills six people in an industrial suburb of Ottawa, Ontario.
- January 14:
  - The number of daily COVID-19 Deltacron infections has peaked in Canada.
  - Analog service is discontinued for all TV stations.
- January 19 – The four members of the Patel family froze to death near Emerson, Manitoba.
- January 22–February 23 – The Freedom Convoy, a series of protests over vaccination mandates, occurs throughout the country.

=== February ===
- February 2 – Erin O'Toole is removed as the leader of the Conservative Party. He was ousted after losing a leadership review from the party's MPs. Candice Bergen is chosen as the party's interim leader.
- February 5 – The 2022 British Columbia Liberal Party leadership election is held. Kevin Falcon is declared the winner.
- February 6 – The Platinum Jubilee of Elizabeth II's accession as Queen of Canada occurs.
- February 14 – Prime Minister Justin Trudeau invokes the Emergencies Act for the first time in Canadian history, in response to the Freedom Convoy.
- February 15:
  - Villa de Pitanxo, a Spanish fishing trawler, capsizes off the coast of Newfoundland and Labrador, killing 21 people.
  - 2022 Athabasca provincial by-election - The Saskatchewan Party wins a seat in Northern Saskatchewan for the first time.
- February 18 – Ryan Meili announces his pending resignation as leader of the Saskatchewan New Democratic Party. He will stay on as leader, until his successor is chosen.
- February 23 – The Emergencies Act is revoked by Justin Trudeau as the Freedom Convoy movement ends.

=== March ===
- March 10 – In a data published by Statistics Canada, around 337,000 jobs have been added in February 2022, dropping the jobless rate down to 5.5 per cent, the lowest in Canada since February 2020, a month prior to the COVID-19 pandemic and recession.
- March 27 – The Canada men's national soccer team defeated Jamaica to qualify for the 2022 FIFA World Cup, ending a 36-year drought since the first and only time Canada played in the FIFA World Cup, in 1986.

=== April ===
- April 12 – The National Hockey League announces that the upcoming Winnipeg Jets game against the Seattle Kraken, originally scheduled for April 13, has been postponed to May 1 as a winter storm sweeps through the southern area of Manitoba.

=== May ===
- May 6 – After a 23-game winning streak, Mattea Roach, a tutor from Toronto, loses on Jeopardy! to Danielle Maurer. Roach won a total of $560,983 (US). As of May 2022, she was the most successful Canadian to play on the show and ranks 5th in all-time regular season wins.
- May 12 – An official death toll from COVID-19 in Canada exceeds 40,000 people since the start of the pandemic.
- May 14 – The Toronto Maple Leafs lose game 7, 2-1, to the Tampa Bay Lightning, extending the Stanley Cup championship drought to 55 years. The drought surpasses the New York Rangers 54-year drought.
- May 15 – The Juno Awards of 2022 are held in Toronto, Ontario.
- May 17–19 – Charles, Prince of Wales and Camilla, Duchess of Cornwall tour the country. The tour mainly focuses on reconciliation with Indigenous people.
- May 19 – The first case of monkeypox was confirmed in Toronto.
- May 21 – An extreme derecho formed in Sarnia, Ontario and continued through the Quebec City-Windsor corridor, causing widespread power outages and damage, affecting 900,000 people, and killing 11.
- May 24 – Quebec's French Language Bill 96 is adopted, with 78 MNAs in favour (from the CAQ and Québec solidaire) and 29 against (from the Liberal Party and Parti Québécois).

=== June ===
- June 2 – The 2022 Ontario general election is held, with the Progressive Conservative Party winning a majority government. Andrea Horwath announces her pending resignation as the leader of the New Democratic Party. Steven Del Duca also announces his pending resignation as the leader of the Liberal Party.
- June 13 – Alek Minassian, the perpetrator of the Toronto van attack, is sentenced to life in prison without the possibility of parole for 25 years.
- June 14 – Canada and Denmark end their competing claims for Hans Island by dividing the island roughly in half ending what was referred to as the Whisky War.
- June 16 – Two Canadian venues – BC Place in Vancouver and BMO Field in Toronto – were announced by FIFA as two of the sixteen venues for the 2026 World Cup.
- June 28 – A shootout occurs between two suspects and responding police officers following a botched robbery of a Bank of Montreal branch in Saanich, British Columbia. Both suspects are killed by police, while six officers are injured.

=== July ===
- July 8 – Telecom provider Rogers Communications experiences a major service outage, affecting more than 12 million users.
- July 24–29 – Pope Francis visits the country, stopping at Edmonton in Alberta, Quebec City in Quebec, and Iqaluit in Nunavut.
- July 25 – Multiple shootings occur in Langley, British Columbia. Three people were killed, including the perpetrator, while two others were injured.

=== August ===
- August 6 – Susan Holt wins the 2022 New Brunswick Liberal Association leadership election.

=== September ===
- September 4 – A stabbing spree occurs in Saskatchewan, killing 11 people and injuring 18 others.
- September 8–18 – The 2022 Toronto International Film Festival is held.
- September 8 – Charles III becomes King of Canada following the death of Queen Elizabeth II.
- September 10 – Charles III is officially proclaimed King of Canada at a ceremony at Rideau Hall.
- September 10 – Pierre Poilievre wins the 2022 Conservative Party of Canada leadership election, becoming the leader of the Conservative Party and the leader of the Official Opposition.
- September 19 – A national day of mourning occurs in Canada for the late Queen Elizabeth II with a federal holiday and a National Commemorative Service in Ottawa.
- September 19 – Canadian representatives attend the funeral of Queen Elizabeth II in London.
- September 26 – Nathaniel Teed wins the 2022 Saskatoon Meewasin provincial by-election.

=== October ===
- October 3 – The Coalition Avenir Québec wins a majority government in the 2022 Quebec general election.
- October 13:
  - Bill Hogan becomes Minister of Education and Early Childhood Development in the Executive Council of New Brunswick, replacing Dominic Cardy who resigned.
  - The 2022 British Columbia municipal elections are held.
- October 20 – Travis Patron, former leader of the Canadian Nationalist Party, is sentenced to one year in jail for wilfully promoting hatred against Jewish people and ordered to refrain from posting about them for a year after the sentence ends.
- October 24 – The 2022 Ontario municipal elections are held.

=== November ===
- November 19 – Elizabeth May wins the 2022 Green Party of Canada leadership election, becoming the leader of the Green Party again since resigning in 2019.
- November 20 – The 109th Grey Cup Game in Regina, Saskatchewan, was won by the Toronto Argonauts, 24–23, against two-time defending champion Winnipeg Blue Bombers.

=== December ===
- December 6 – The Coalition Avenir Québec led by François Legault government tables a bill that would make Oath of Allegiance to the King optional for MNAs.
- December 8 – The Alberta Sovereignty Within a United Canada Act, which grants the cabinet of Alberta the ability to nullify national laws, passes the Albertan legislature by a party line vote of 27–7, following significant opposition by the Alberta New Democratic Party and Indigenous chiefs.
- December 9 – The Coalition Avenir Québec government bill that would make the Oath of Allegiance optional for MNAs passes unanimously.
- December 18
  - A mass shooting occurs in a condominium tower in Vaughan, Ontario. Six people are killed, including the perpetrator.
  - Eight teenage girls fatally stab one man in Toronto.
- December 20 – Single-use plastics are banned from being manufactured or imported in the country.

=== Unspecified date ===
- 2022 Canadian federal electoral redistribution

== Deaths ==
=== January ===
- January 1 – Barbara Chilcott, actress (b. 1922)
- January 2 – John Efford, politician (b. 1944)
- January 4 – Darwin Semotiuk, football coach and professor of kinesiology at the University of Western Ontario (b. 1945)
- January 6
  - Larry Haylor, football coach (b. 1946)
  - Jo Manning, etcher, painter, and author (b. 1923)
  - Murray Peden, Air Force pilot, lawyer, and author (b. 1923)
- January 7
  - Amanda Asay, baseball and ice hockey player (b. 1988)
  - Harpdog Brown, vocalist and harmonica player (b. 1962)
  - Tom Corston, Anglican bishop (b. 1949)
  - Raymond Malenfant, businessman (b. 1930)
  - Eberhard Zeidler, German-born architect (b. 1926)
- January 8 – Frank Hasenfratz, Hungarian-born businessman who founded and owned the car parts maker Linamar (b. 1935)
- January 10 – Ian Greenberg, businessman and media pioneer (b. 1942)
- January 11
  - Vince Fontaine, musician (b. 1962 or 1963)
  - Phil Samis, ice hockey player (b. 1927)
- January 12 – William Hogan, politician (b. 1937)
- January 14
  - Sean Rice, figure skater (b. 1972)
  - Edward Roberts, politician (b. 1940)
- January 15
  - Jean-Claude Lord, film director and screenwriter (b. 1943)
  - Alexa McDonough, politician (b. 1944)
- January 16 – Michael Brecher, political scientist and teacher (b. 1925)
- January 17 – Karim Ouellet, Senegalese-born singer-songwriter (b. 1984)
- January 19
  - Sonya Biddle, actress and politician (b. 1957)
  - Randy Boyd, ice hockey player (b. 1962)
- January 21 – Clark Gillies, ice hockey player (b. 1954)
- January 23 – Guy Saint-Pierre, politician and businessman (b. 1934)
- January 25 – Jean-Claude Corbeil, linguist and lexicographer (b. 1932)
- January 29
  - Jean-Paul Bordeleau, politician (b. 1943)
  - Ralph Mellanby, sportscaster and television producer (b. 1934)
- January 30 – Jeffrey A. Hutchings, fisheries scientist (b. 1958)
- January 31 – Mike Nykoluk, ice hockey player and coach (b. 1934)

=== February ===
- February 1 – Remi De Roo, Catholic bishop (b. 1924)
- February 3
  - Donny Gerrard, singer (b. 1946)
  - Erna Paris, non-fiction author (b. 1938)
  - Bob Proctor, self-help author and lecturer (b. 1934)
- February 4
  - Kerry Chater, musician (b. 1945)
  - Don Johnston, lawyer, writer and politician (b. 1936)
- February 5
  - Wayne Hankey, religious philosopher (b. 1944)
  - John Honderich, businessman, journalist, and editor (b. 1946)
- February 7 – Bruce Owen, lawyer and politician (b. 1931)
- February 8 – Ricky Hunter, wrestler (b. 1936)
- February 9
  - David Botwinik, Lithuanian-born composer and music teacher (b. 1920)
  - Harold R. Johnson, lawyer and writer (b. c. 1957)
- February 11 – Jean-Marc Piotte, philosopher and sociologist (b. 1940)
- February 12 – Ivan Reitman, Slovak-born film director and producer (b. 1946)
- February 14 – Elliott Leyton, social-anthropologist, educator, and author (b. 1939)
- February 15 – Charles Juravinski, businessman and philanthropist (b. 1929)
- February 17
  - Marc Hamilton, singer (b. 1944)
  - Ginette Ravel, singer and lyricist (b. 1940).
  - François Ricard, writer and academic (b. 1947)
  - John Scott, multimedia painter, sculptor, and installation artist (b. 1950)
- February 18
  - Danic Champoux, documentary filmmaker (b. 1976)
  - Steve Fonyo, runner (b. 1965)
- February 19
  - Emile Francis, ice hockey player, coach, and general manager (b. 1926)
  - Latjor Tuel, South Sudanese immigrant to Canada (b. 1980 or 1981)
- February 20 – Robert Silverman, cycling activist (b. 1933)
- February 23 – Bernard Langer, surgeon and educator (b. 1932)
- February 25 – Gérard-Joseph Deschamps, Roman Catholic prelate (b. 1929)
- February 27 – Brian Fawcett, writer and cultural analyst (b. 1944)

=== March ===
- March 2 – Evérard Daigle, politician (b. 1925)
- March 3
  - John Duffy, political strategist and writer (b. 1963)
  - Clément Richard, lawyer, businessman, and politician (b. 1939)
- March 4
  - Iwan Edwards, Welsh-born choral conductor (b. 1937)
  - Jean-Guy Guilbault, businessman and politician (b. 1931)
  - Bill Phipps, ordained minister of the United Church of Canada, lawyer, and social activist (b. 1942)
- March 9 – Ron Hansen, politician (b. 1943)
- March 10 – Gerry Goyer, ice hockey player (b. 1936)
- March 14 – Eric Mercury, musician, singer, and composer (b. 1944)
- March 15
  - Joan Langdon, American-born competitive swimmer and breaststroker (b. 1922)
  - Jean Potvin, ice hockey player (b. 1949)
- March 18
  - Lenard Gustafson, politician (b. 1933)
  - Pepper Martin, Canadian-American actor and professional wrestler (b. 1936)
- March 21 – Lawrence Dane, actor (b. 1937)
- March 23 – James Downey, academic (b. 1939)
- March 24
  - Johnny Fripp, skier and football player (b. 1921)
  - Marty Martinello, football player (b. 1931)
- March 26 – Claudette Bradshaw, politician (b. 1949)
- March 28 – Eugene Melnyk, businessman, philanthropist, owner of the Ottawa Senators, and founder of Biovail (b. 1959)
- March 29 – Joyce Fairbairn, politician and senator (b. 1939)
- March 30
  - Fred Markus, cyclist (b. 1937)
  - John Zaritsky, documentary filmmaker (b. 1943)

=== April ===
- April 1 – Neil Stevens, sportswriter (b. 1947)
- April 5
  - Sidney Altman, Canadian-American molecular biologist (b. 1939)
  - Boris Brott, conductor and motivational speaker (b. 1944)
  - David Kilgour, human rights activist, author, lawyer, and politician (b. 1941)
  - Bjarni Tryggvason, Icelandic-born engineer and astronaut (b. 1945)
- April 9 – Lawrence Poitras, judge (b. 1931)
- April 13 – Tom McCarthy, ice hockey player (b. 1960)
- April 15
  - David G. Barber, environmental scientist and academic (b. 1960)
  - Mike Bossy, ice hockey player (b. 1957)
- April 16 – Bill Bourne, musician (b. 1954)
- April 18 – Jerry Doucette, musician (b. 1952)
- April 19
  - Steven Heighton, fiction writer, poet, and singer-songwriter (b. 1961)
  - John McKay, British-Canadian mathematician (b. 1939)
- April 22
  - Guy Lafleur, ice hockey player (b. 1951)
  - Marcus Leatherdale, photographer (b. 1952)
- April 25
  - Susan Jacks, musician and record producer (b. 1948)
  - Shane Yellowbird, musician (b. 1979)
- April 28 – John Bosley, politician (b. 1947)
- April 29 – Walter Rossi, Italian-Canadian musician (b. 1947)

=== May ===
- May 5
  - Mario Roy, journalist and editorialist (b. 1951)
  - Kenneth Welsh, actor (b. 1942)
- May 8
  - André Arthur, radio host and politician (b. 1943)
  - Michel Gervais, rector of Université Laval (b. 1944)
- May 9 – Gerald Hannon, journalist (b. 1944)
- May 13 – Jim Lyall, politician and Inuit advocate (b. 1945)
- May 14
  - François Blais, writer (b. 1973)
  - James Francis Edwards, fighter pilot during World War II (b. 1921)
- May 15
  - David Milgaard, man who was wrongfully convicted for the rape and murder of a nursing student (b. 1952)
  - Sean Shanahan, ice hockey player (b. 1951)
- May 17 – Robert Bertrand, politician (b. 1953)
- May 18 – Paul Plimley, musician (b. 1953)
- May 21 – Jane Haist, discus thrower and shot putter (b. 1949)
- May 26 – Ann Johnston, figure skater (b. 1936)
- May 29 – Ronnie Hawkins, American-Canadian musician (b. 1935)

=== June ===
- June 3
  - Larry Hillman, ice hockey player and coach (b. 1937)
  - Dorothy E. Smith, British-born ethnographer, feminist studies scholar, sociologist, and writer (b. 1926)
  - Jack Weisgerber, politician and businessman (b. 1940)
- June 4
  - Eric Nesterenko, ice hockey player (b. 1933)
  - Tony Pajaczkowski, football player (b. 1936)
- June 5
  - Peter Ascherl, German-Canadian ice hockey player (b. 1953)
  - Christopher Pratt, painter and printmaker (b. 1935)
  - Eldon Rasmussen, racing driver (b. 1936)
- June 8 – Myron Kowalsky, politician and teacher (b. 1941)
- June 9 – Matt Zimmerman, actor (b. 1934)
- June 11 – Loretta Rogers, English-born philanthropist and director of Rogers Communications (b. 1939)
- June 14 – Bearcat Murray, athletic trainer for the Calgary Flames (b. 1933)
- June 16 – Big Rude Jake, musician (b. 1963)
- June 25 – John Leefe, author, educator, and politician (b. 1942)
- June 26 – Adele Armin, classical violinist (b. 1945)
- June 27
  - Jack Gordon, ice hockey manager, coach, and player (b. 1928)
  - Nick Nemeroff, stand-up comedian (b. 1989)
- June 29 – Jim Pappin, ice hockey player (b. 1939)
- June 30 – Jean-Guy Gendron, ice hockey player (b. 1934)

=== July ===
- July 2
  - David Blackwood, artist (b. 1941)
  - Laurent Noël, prelate of the Roman Catholic Church (b. 1920)
- July 3 – Irving Abella, historian who served as a professor at York University (b. 1940)
- July 4 – Patrick Watson, broadcaster, writer, and producer (b. 1929)
- July 6 – Bryan Marchment, ice hockey player (b. 1969)
- July 7
  - Peter Burwash, tennis player and coach (b. 1945)
  - Max Eisen, Slovak-Canadian author and Holocaust survivor (b. 1929)
  - Rod Zaine, ice hockey player (b. 1946)
- July 8 – Alan Pope, Scottish-born politician (b. 1945)
- July 10 – Maurice Boucher, murderer, outlaw biker, and president of the Hells Angels' Montreal chapter (b. 1953)
- July 11 – Terence Macartney-Filgate, British-Canadian filmmaker (b. 1924)
- July 13 – Pat John, actor (b. 1953)
- July 16 – Paul Hannam, physician and sailor (b. 1971)
- July 18
  - Larry Jeffrey, ice hockey player (b. 1940)
  - Françoise Riopelle, dancer and choreographer (b. 1927)
- July 20
  - Rex Crawford, American-born politician and farmer (b. 1932)
  - Henry Janzen, football player and coach (b. 1940)
  - Douglas Mitchell, football player and CFL commissioner (b. 1939)
- July 26
  - Lukas Lundin, Swedish-Canadian businessman (b. 1958)
  - Alfred Moses, politician (b. 1977)
- July 27
  - Gisèle Lalonde, politician, community activist, and Mayor of Vanier, Ontario (b. 1933)
  - Burt Metcalfe, Canadian-American film and television producer, director, screenwriter, and actor (b. 1935)
- July 28
  - Gil Hayes, professional wrestler (b. 1939)
  - Jason Di Tullio, soccer player and coach (b. 1984)
- July 31 – A. Jean de Grandpré, president and chief executive officer of Bell Canada Enterprises Inc. (b. 1921)

=== August ===
- August 2
  - Stan Dragland, novelist, poet, and literary critic (b. 1942)
  - Clayton Ruby, lawyer and activist (b. 1942)
- August 3 – Terry Caffery, ice hockey player (b. 1949)
- August 6 – Bob Skelly, politician (b. 1943)
- August 7
  - Ned Goodman, businessman and chancellor of Brock University (b. 1937)
  - Bill Graham, lawyer, academic, and politician (b. 1939)
  - Gord Lewis, founding guitarist of Teenage Head (b. 1957)
- August 8 – Tom Hedderson, politician (b. 1954)
- August 10 – Julian Klymkiw, ice hockey player (b. 1933)
- August 12 – Lyle Bradley, ice hockey player (b. 1943)
- August 16 – Alex Polowin, Lithuanian-born World War II veteran (b. 1924)
- August 17 – Mabel DeWare, politician, curler, and senator (b. 1926)
- August 18 – Ellen Leonard, systematic theologian and Roman Catholic religious sister (b. 1933)
- August 19 – Harrison Gray, ice hockey player (b. 1941)
- August 24 – Paul Knox, ice hockey player (b. 1933)
- August 25
  - John Mercer Reid, politician and Information Commissioner of Canada (b. 1937)
  - Orval Tessier, ice hockey player and coach (b. 1933)
- August 27 – Dave Bailey, track and field athlete (b. 1945)
- August 29
  - Sam Glucksberg, professor (b. 1933)
  - Pat McGeer, physician, professor, medical researcher, and basketball player (b. 1927)
- August 30 – Bob Russell, American-born politician (b. 1930)
- August 31 – Normand Chaurette, playwright (b. 1954)

=== September ===
- September 2 – Denis Berthiaume, academic and researcher (b. 1969)
- September 3 – Scott Campbell, ice hockey player (b. 1957)
- September 4 – John Till, musician (b. 1945)
- September 8 – Elizabeth II, Queen of Canada (b. 1926)
- September 9 – Clive Tanner, English-born politician (b. 1934)
- September 11 – Elias Theodorou, mixed martial artist (b. 1988)
- September 12 – Michael DeGroote, Belgian-born businessman and philanthropist (b. 1933)
- September 15 – Jeanne Renaud, dancer, choreographer, and artistic director (b. 1928)
- September 18 – Diane Guérin, actress and singer (b. 1948)
- September 19 – Harry Langford, football player (b. 1929)
- September 21 – Tom Benner, sculptor, painter, and installation artist (b. 1950)
- September 22 – Dave Barrow, Mayor of Richmond Hill, Ontario (b. 1947)
- September 24
  - Tim Ball, British-born professor at the University of Winnipeg, public speaker, and writer (b. 1938)
  - Bill Blaikie, politician (b. 1951)
- September 25
  - Jonathan Beaulieu-Richard, football player (b. 1988)
  - Robert Steckle, Olympic wrestler (b. 1930)
- September 28 – Andre Payette, ice hockey player (b. 1976)
- September 29 – Gilles Loiselle, politician (b. 1929)

=== October ===
- October 1
  - Marguerite Andersen, German-born writer and teacher (b. 1924)
  - John Boxtel, Dutch-Canadian sculptor and art teacher (b. 1930)
- October 4
  - Dave Dryden, ice hockey player (b. 1941)
  - Gordon Beattie Martin, sportscaster and politician (b. 1932)
  - Peter Robinson, British-born crime writer (b. 1950)
- October 7 – Brenda MacGibbon, mathematician, statistician, decision scientist, and professor at the Université du Québec à Montréal (b. 1944)
- October 8 – André Chagnon, businessman, philanthropist, and founder of Vidéotron (b. 1928)
- October 11
  - Marion Boyd, politician (b. 1946)
  - André Brassard, stage director, filmmaker, and actor (b. 1946)
  - Joe Crozier, ice hockey player and coach (b. 1929)
- October 13 – Jeff Barnaby, filmmaker (b. 1976)
- October 14
  - Étienne Gaboury, architect (b. 1930)
  - André Spénard, politician (b. 1950)
- October 15 – Simon Roy, author and professor at the Collège Lionel-Groulx (b. 1968)
- October 16
  - Doris Margaret Anderson, nutritionist and politician (b. 1922)
  - Robert McKinley, politician (b. 1928)
- October 20
  - Jacques Brault, poet, translator, and professor at the Université de Montréal (b. 1933)
  - Blanche Lemco van Ginkel, British-born architect, city planner, and educator (b. 1923)
- October 21 – Cynthia Lai, Chinese-Canadian politician (b. 1954)
- October 22 – Rodney Graham, artist and musician (b. 1949)
- October 23 – Michael Kopsa, actor (b. 1956)
- October 24 – Myer Horowitz, academic and president of the University of Alberta (b. 1932)
- October 26 – Mike Birch, navigator (b. 1931)
- October 28 – Larry South, politician (b. 1925)
- October 30 – Andrew Dawes, violinist (b. 1940)

=== November ===
- November 1 – Brent Pope, ice hockey player (b. 1973)
- November 4 – Alvin Segal, American-born businessman and philanthropist (b. 1933)
- November 5
  - Val Delory, ice hockey player (b. 1927)
  - Ivan Eyre, artist (b. 1935)
- November 10 – Alan Park, comedian and political satirist (b. 1962)
- November 12 – Pierre Fournier, comic book writer, artist, editor, promoter, and publisher (b. 1949)
- November 15 – Gudrun Parker, filmmaker (b. 1920)
- November 18
  - Myriam Cliche, poet, illustrator, artisan, and linguist (b. 1961)
  - Jean Lapointe, actor, comedian, singer, and politician (b. 1935)
- November 21
  - Josef Svoboda, Czechoslovak-born Arctic tundra scientist and botanist (b. 1929)
  - Peter Trynchy, businessman, farmer, and politician (b. 1931)
- November 25 – Al Mair (b. 1940), founder of Attic Records
- November 26
  - Al Falle, politician (b. 1943)
  - Marcel Lefebvre, screenwriter, composer, author, and artist (b. 1941)
  - Monique Nemni, Italian-born linguist and writer (b. 1935 or 1936)
- November 27 – Murray Waxman, Olympic basketball player (b. 1925)
- November 28 – Rob Armitage, curler (b. 1957)

=== December ===
- December 2
  - Phil Edmonston, American-born consumer advocate, writer, journalist, and politician (b. 1944)
  - Doreen Hamilton, politician (b. 1951)
  - Louis Negin, British-born actor (b. 1929)
- December 4
  - Barry Fraser, ice hockey executive (b. 1940)
  - Patrick Peacock, lawyer, national president of the Canadian Bar Association, and president of the Calgary Stampeders (b. 1943)
- December 5
  - John Beckwith, composer, writer, pianist, teacher, and administrator (b. 1927)
  - Sam Wakim, lawyer and politician (b. 1937)
- December 8
  - Gary Fox, politician (b. 1943)
  - Jackie McLeod, ice hockey player and coach (b. 1930)
  - Kevin Schamehorn, ice hockey player (b. 1956)
- December 9 – Pedro Miguel Arce, Nicaraguan-born actor (b. 1976)
- December 12
  - Jim Carr, politician, journalist, and professional oboist (b. 1951)
  - Maurice Desnoyers, architect (b. 1927)
- December 15
  - Shirley Eikhard, musician (b. 1955)
  - Michael Reed, cinematographer (b. 1929)
- December 16
  - Doreen Brownstone, British-born actress (b. 1922)
  - Barry Cullen, ice hockey player (b. 1935)
- December 17 – Albert Reichmann, Austrian-born businessman (b. 1929)
- December 18
  - Don McKenney, ice hockey player and coach (b. 1934)
  - Carol Teichrob, politician (b. 1939)
- December 24 – Jean Paré, caterer and author (b. 1927)
- December 27 – Maximilien Polak, Dutch-born judge and politician (b. 1930)
- December 29 – Ian Tyson, musician (b. 1933)

== See also ==
- 2022 monkeypox outbreak in Canada
- 2022 Canadian electoral calendar
- 2022 in Canadian soccer
- 2022 in Canadian music
- 2022 in Canadian television
