= Toronto stabbing =

Toronto stabbing could refer to one of the following:

- Toronto machete attack, in 2020
- Killing of Ken Lee, in 2022
