= Brahmani (Matrika) =

One of the seven Mother Goddesses in Hinduism

- Shakti of Brahma
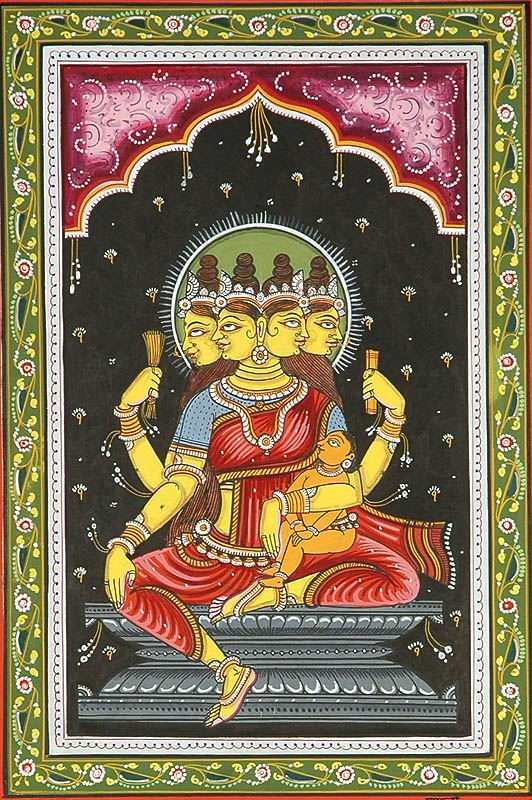
- Brahmani depicted as feminine version of Brahma
- Devanagari: ब्रह्माणी
- Sanskrit transliteration: Brahmāṇī
- Affiliation: Saraswati
- Abode: Brahmaloka or Satyaloka
- Mount: Swan & lotus
- Consort: Brahma

Brahmani (Sanskrit: ब्रह्माणी, IAST: Brahmāṇī) or Brahmi (Sanskrit: ब्राह्मी, IAST: Brāhmī), is one of the seven Hindu mother goddesses known as Sapta Matrikas. She is a form of Saraswati and is considered as the Shakti of the creator god Brahma in Hinduism. She is an aspect of Adi Shakti, possessing the "Rajas Guna" and is therefore the source of Brahma's power.

== Legends ==
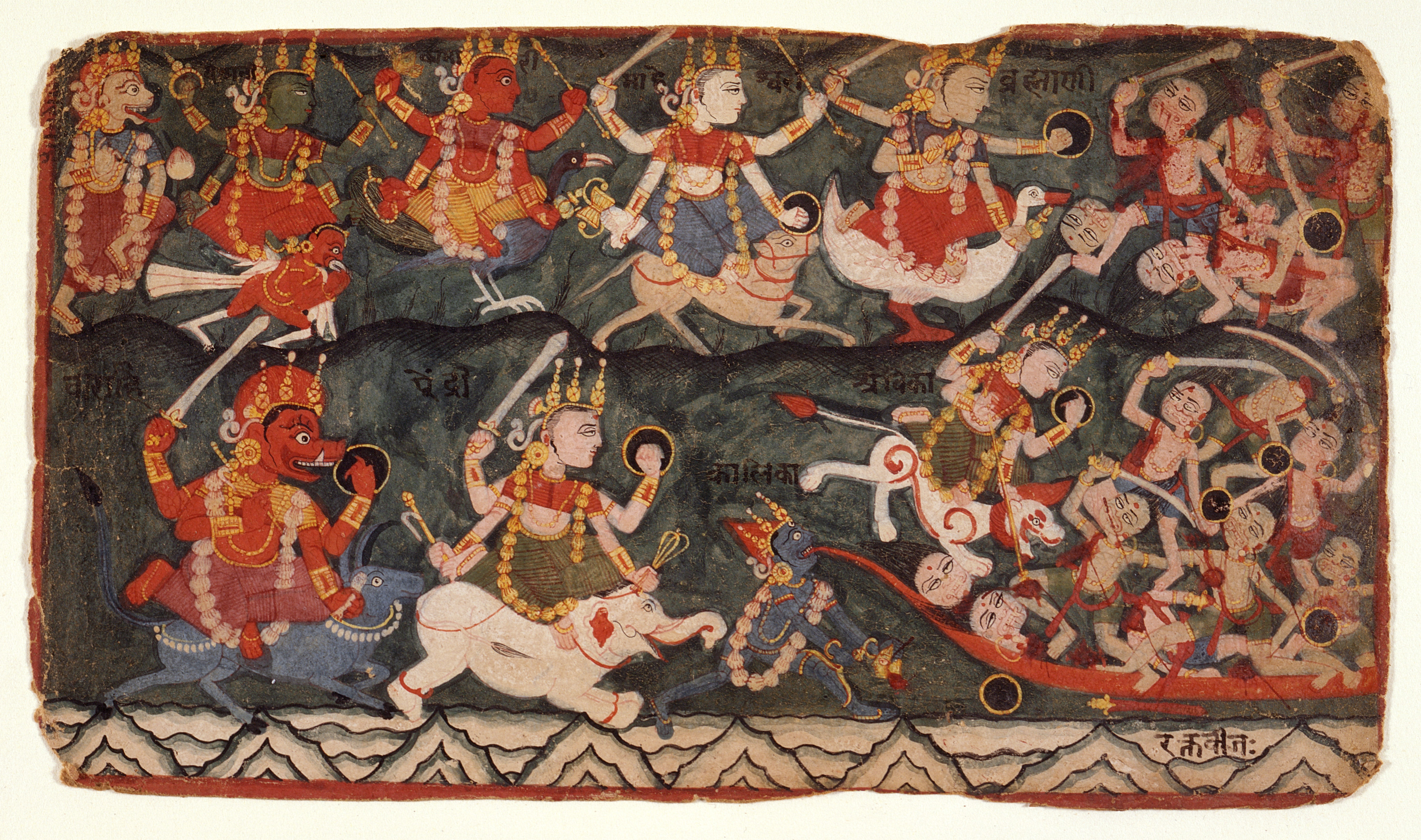
The Goddess Ambika (identified with Durga or Chandi) leading the Eight Matrikas in battle (top row, from the left) Narasinhmi, Vaishnavi, Kaumari, Maheshvari, Brahmani. (bottom row, from left) Varahi, Aindri and Chamunda or Kali against the Rakshasa Raktabija. A Folio from a Devi Mahatmya. Devi Brahmani is depicted as riding on a white swan in the battle with sword and shield in her arms.

When Brahma was in meditation for the creation of the universe, his body was divided into two parts. They then formed the gods and goddesses, whereby one part was male and the other one female. Thus female parts became Gayatri, Savitri, Saraswati, and others.

== Iconography ==
The goddess is depicted yellow in colour with four heads and four(or six) arms. Like Brahma, she holds a japamala, a kamandalu (water pot), a lotus stalk, bells, vedas and the trident while she is seated on a hamsa (identified with a swan or goose) as her vahana (mount or vehicle). Sometimes, she is shown seated on a lotus with a swan on her banner. She wears various ornaments and is distinguished by her basket-shaped crown called karaṇḍa mukuṭa.

== Kuldevi ==
She is the Kuldevi Prajapati samaj (Gurjar), Kshatriya Kadiya, Golvadiyas (subcast of leuva Patels), nagar brahmins, darji samaj and other communities of Rajasthan and Kutch, including Rajputs and the KGK Community. She is also kuldevi of Barot (Rao) in Nadri village of Sabarkantha district in Gujarat.

== Brahmani temples in India ==
- Brahmani Mataji Temple at Baran in Rajasthan.
- Brahmani Mataji Temple at Pallo near Hanumangarh, Rajasthan.
- Brahmani Mata Temple at Village Brahmani, Hanumanganj, near Ballia in Uttar Pradesh.
- Brahmani Mata Temple at Bharmour near Chamba, Himachal Pradesh.
- Brahmani Mata Temple at Dingucha near Kalol, Gujarat.
- Brahmani Mata Temple at Jamiyatpura, Gandhinagar
- Brahmani Mata Temple at Sorsan, Rajasthan
- Brahmani Mata Temple at Anjar.
- Brahmani Mata temple at Visnagar.
- Brahmani Mata Temple
- In Narsoli village of Bhiloda district (Gujarat) there are also 1000 year old temples of Shri Brahmani Mata and Shri Eklingji Mahadev which were destroyed in the Mughal attack, their archeological remains are still present and Eklingji temple is being rebuilt at the same place.
- Brahmani Devi Temple at Mollem, Goa

== See also ==
- Vaishnavi
- Mahasaraswati
- Tridevi
