= Death of Patel family =

2022 deaths in Canada

Coordinates: 49.0013°N 97.1474°W

- Location: Emerson, Manitoba
- Date: January 2022
- Deaths: 4

In January 2022, Jagdish Patel, Vaishaliben Patel, and their children Vihangi and Dharmik died in Emerson, Manitoba, twelve meters away from the United States border. The family were killed by the cold, which reached −35 °C (−31 °F) around the time of their deaths, as they attempted to emigrate from India to the US, via Canada.

== Patel family ==
At the time of his death Jagdish Patel was aged 39. He was married to Vaishaliben, aged 37, and was travelling with their daughter Vihangi, aged 11 and their son, Dharmik, aged 3. The family was from the village of Dingucha, in Gujarat state, western India; many villagers in Dingucha aspire to emigrate to the US.

The family travelled from India to Toronto on January 12, 2022. Canadian police deduced that they then travelled towards the US border by road, due to the lack of air travel records in the family names, arriving in Emerson, Manitoba on January 18, 2022.

== Border crossing attempt and death ==
The Patel family and seven others attempted to walk across the border, as part of an immigration scheme. The family were likely unprepared for the low temperatures, which reached −35 °C (−31 °F) at the time. They were found dead by police in a field in Emerson, Manitoba. The family were described by Canadian authorities as the victims of human trafficking.

== Aftermath ==
The Patel family's death increased public and media awareness of the Indian people smugglers using Canada as a waypoint to get to the United States. While the Mexico–United States border is heavily guarded, the Canadian border is comparatively easier to walk over.

Police in India arrested two men on January 16, 2022 and charged with crimes including human trafficking and causing death. Several days later, Indian police arrested another suspect.

== See also ==
- History of immigration to Canada
- Immigration to the United States
