= Brahmani Mata Temple =

Hindu temple in Rajasthan, India

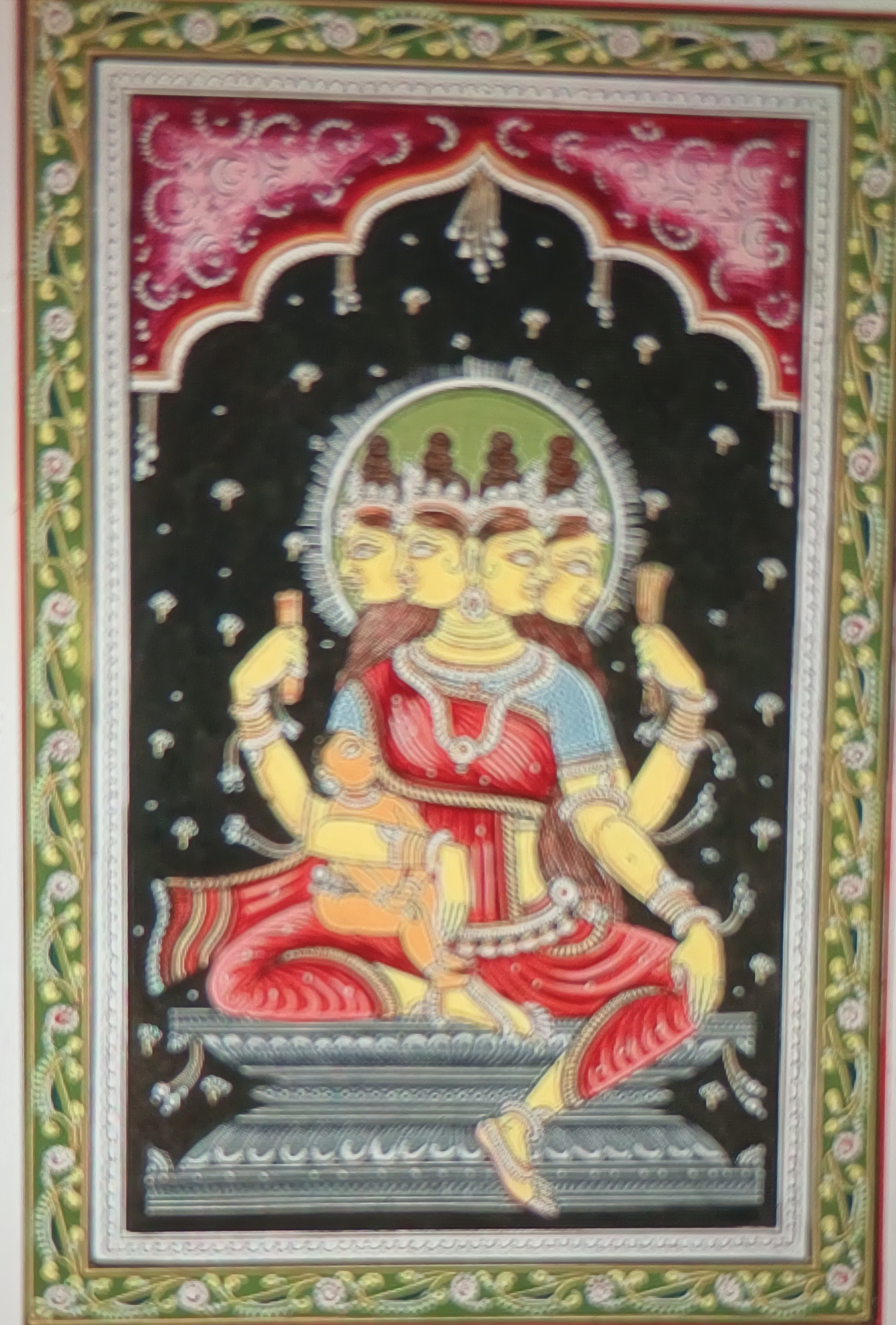
- Mata Brahmaani is seated on the throne.

- Location in Rajasthan Brahmani Mata Temple (India)

Religion
- Affiliation: Shaktism
- District: Hanumangarh
- Deity: Goddess Brahmani

Location
- Location: Pallu, Jasrasar
- State: Rajasthan
- Country: India
- Interactive map of Brahmani Mata Temple
- Coordinates: 28°56′01″N 74°12′33″E

The temple of Maa Brahmini Mata is a Hindu temple in Pallu, Jasrasar, Rajasthan, India. The temple of Maa Brahmani is on the Rajasthan State Highway 7, and the devotees going to Salasar visit the court of Mata Rani. She is kuladevi of Tard Jaats of Jasrasar. Also Kuladevi of Prajapati community in Gujarat region

== See also ==
- Tourism in Rajasthan
