= Mario Roy =

Canadian journalist and editorialist (1951–2022)

- Born: 1951; Quebec City, Quebec, Canada
- Died: 5 May 2022 (aged 70–71); Montreal, Quebec, Canada
- Occupation: Journalist

Mario Roy (1951 – 5 May 2022) was a Canadian journalist and editorialist. He wrote in the newspaper La Presse from 1981 to 2014.

== Biography ==
Roy was responsible for the Arts et spectacles section of La Presse for several years. In 1991, he published a biography on Gerry Boulet titled Gerry Boulet. Avant de m'en aller, which served as the basis of the 2011 film Gerry directed by Alain DesRochers. He also published a novel in 1997, titled Cité.

Roy became a journalist with La Presse in the 2000s alongside André Pratte and wrote in opposition to the Iraq War while remaining critical of Saddam Hussein. His editorials led to him facing a pie attack.

Roy's politics stood on the centre-right. He was known as an advocate for French-style secularism in Quebec and condemned the use of religious symbols in government, such as the kirpan.

Mario Roy died in Montreal on 5 May 2022, at the age of 71.

== Publications ==
- Le Pendu de Chicoutimi (1980)
- Gerry Boulet. Avant de m'en aller (1991)
- Pour en finir avec l'antiaméricanisme (1993)
- Cité (1997)
