= Alex Polowin =

Canadian marine (1924–2022)

Alexander Polowin (15 April 1924 – 16 August 2022) was a Lithuanian-born Canadian Second World War veteran.

Born in Lithuania to a Jewish family Polowin immigrated to Canada at age 3. He decided to enlist in the Royal Canadian Navy at 17 because of the experiences of his relatives in Lithuania under German occupation during the Second World War. In order to enlist he tricked his father, who could not read English, into signing a document attesting that he was 18. He initially supported convoys to the Soviet Union, but during Operation Overlord was assigned to protecting landing craft.

After the war Polowin worked as an insurance broker. He also participated in educational programs, speaking over 200 times to schoolchildren in Ottawa.

Polowin was the "first non-French serviceman to receive the French Legion of Honour Medal". His other awards include the Atlantic Star, the Queen Elizabeth II Diamond Jubilee Medal, the Soviet Peace Medal, and the Order of Ushakov. An Ottawa street was renamed Alex Polowin Avenue in his honour.

Polowin died in Ottawa, Ontario on 16 August 2022, at the age of 98.
