= Myriam Cliche =

Canadian poet and illustrator (1961–2022)

- Born: 1961; Sherbrooke, Quebec, Canada
- Died: 18 November 2022 (aged 61)
- Occupation(s): Poet; Illustrator

Myriam Cliche (1961 – 18 November 2022) was a Canadian poet, illustrator, artisan, and linguist. She primarily wrote in French for the Montreal-based publishing house L'Oie de Cravan.

== Biography ==
Cliche was the author of several books:

- La Voix de l'autre berger (1992)
- 1971 Oiseau (1996)
- Les peintures de forêt (2000)
- Fanette chaque jour (2002)
- Myriam et le loup (2005)
- Fleuve Russe (2008)

Cliche also participated in several artistic projects. In 1986, she contributed to the production of the "La Calembredaine" software alongside Alain Bergeron, an artist and programmer. In October 1988, she presented the software at an artistic exhibition at the .(La Société de conservation du présent). In 1991, she began writing for the magazine Revue des animaux. The final edition of the magazine was published in June 2000. In 2002, she illustrated poem P'tite Peau, written by Karina Mancini.

Cliche died from cancer on 18 November 2022, at the age of 61.
