= Simon Roy (author) =

Canadian author (1968–2022)

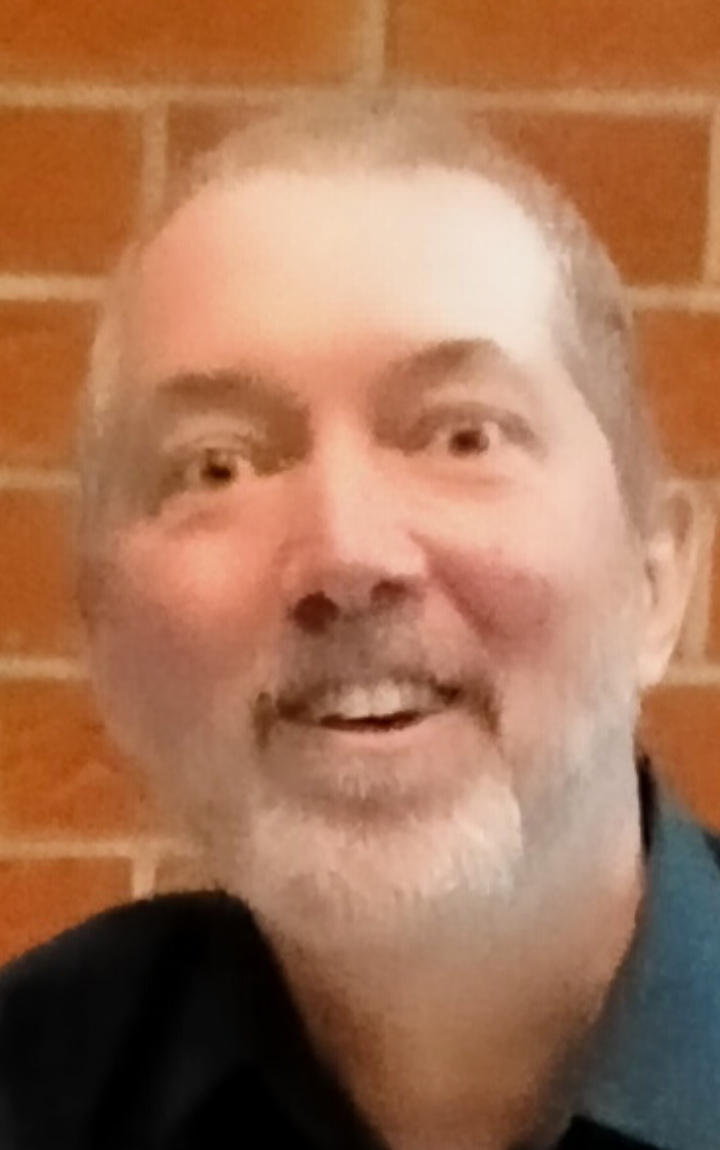
- Roy in 2021
- Born: 14 June 1968; Saint-Alexis, Quebec, Canada
- Died: 15 October 2022 (aged 54)
- Occupations: Author; Professor

Simon Roy (14 June 1968 – 15 October 2022) was a Canadian author. He was also a professor of literature at the Collège Lionel-Groulx for more than thirty years.

== Biography ==
Born on 14 June 1968 in Saint-Alexis, Roy married Marianne Marquis-Gravel, with whom he had two children, Romane and Colin. He was known for his 2014 novel Ma vie rouge Kubrick, which received the Prix des libraires du Québec in the category of Québécois novels.

Roy died of brain cancer on 15 October 2022, at the age of 54. His relationship with Marquis-Gravel in the final months of his life was the subject of Simon and Marianne (Simon et Marianne), a 2024 documentary film by Pier-Luc Latulippe and Martin Fournier.

== Books ==
- Ma vie rouge Kubrick (2014)
- Owen Hopkins, esquire (2016)
- Fait par un autre (2021)
- Ma fin du monde (2022)
