= Josef Svoboda (scientist) =

Canadian Arctic tundra scientist (1929–2022)

Josef Svoboda CM
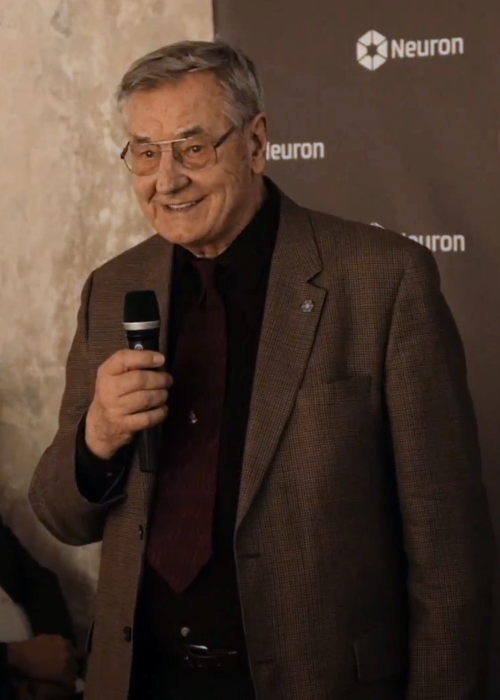
- Svoboda in 2017
- Born: 16 July 1929; Prague, Czechoslovakia
- Died: 21 November 2022 (aged 93)
- Education: University of Western Ontario (BSc); University of Alberta (PhD)
- Occupations: Biologist, ecologist
- Awards: Neuron Prize (biology, 2017); Order of Canada (2019); South Moravian Region Award (2020)
- Scientific career
- Workplaces: University of Toronto Mississauga

Josef Svoboda CM (16 July 1929 – 21 November 2022) was a Canadian Arctic tundra scientist and botanist, who was appointed an Officer of the Order of Canada (2019) for his pioneering scientific contributions regarding the Arctic tundra ecosystems, and his lifelong mentorship of scientists. He was an emeritus professor at the University of Toronto Mississauga.

== Early life ==
Svoboda was born in Prague, Czechoslovakia on 16 July 1929, and raised in Moravia (in the Czech Republic). His father was a locomotive engineer. Svoboda survived World War II, and developed an early love for nature by his Scout leader. He graduated from high school in 1948, and then began studying biology and philosophy at Masaryk University in 1948.

While in university, Svoboda's involvement in student underground politics prompted his arrest at the age of 20, where he spent almost nine years in various prisons and labour camps, including being forced to work in a uranium mine for four years. While incarcerated, Svoboda continued to learn from fellow prisoners, and even received seminary training from bishops and prelates in a Leopoldov prison, though he was never ordained. Upon release in 1958, Svoboda attempted to continue his university studies with little success before taking on a research role at the Academy of Science in Brno.

== Research career ==
In the Prague Spring of 1968, at the age of 39, Svoboda left for Canada to complete a Bachelor of Science degree at the University of Western Ontario, a doctorate at the University of Alberta, and then began a 22-year-long teaching and research career at the University of Toronto's Erindale College (now known as the University of Toronto Mississauga). Since 1973, Svoboda has been studying the Arctic plant ecosystem in Nunavut and other parts of northern Canada. From 1992 and onwards, Svoboda's research lab has participated in the International Tundra Experiment to understand the timing and abundance of various Arctic flowers across different sites in relation to global warming. In 1993, Svoboda received a Northern Science Award from the Polar Knowledge Canada in recognition of his contributions to the global understanding of plant communities following glacial retreat, and his pioneering approaches in Arctic botany.

Svoboda was later an emeritus professor of biology at the University of Toronto Mississauga. He recounted his life, from a Communist regime to the Canadian Arctic, in a 2017 autobiography titled: Wine from Raisins, A Life Transformed through Communist Gulag to Canadian Arctic. He was appointed an Officer of the Order of Canada in 2019.

== Personal life and death ==
In 1964 Svoboda married Kveta Krivkova, the sister of a fellow prisoner, who emigrated to Canada with him in 1968. They separated in 1973 when she returned to Czechoslovakia.

Svoboda died on 21 November 2022, at the age of 93.

== Legacy ==
The Czech Josef Svoboda Arctic Research Station, is based in Longyearbyen. The station is the property of the University of South Bohemia in České Budějovice. It also provides facilities for scientists, researchers, and students from the Czech University of Life Sciences Prague, the Czech Academy of Sciences, and all over the world.

== Selected bibliography ==
- Chapin III, F. Stuart, Robert L. Jefferies, James F. Reynolds, Gaius R. Shaver, Josef Svoboda, and Ellen W. Chu, eds. Arctic ecosystems in a changing climate: an ecophysiological perspective. Academic Press, 2012.
- Henry, Greg HR, and Josef Svoboda. "Dinitrogen fixation (acetylene reduction) in high arctic sedge meadow communities." Arctic and Alpine Research 18, no. 2 (1986): 181–187.
- Havstrom, M., Terry V. Callaghan, Sven Jonasson, and Josef Svoboda. "Little Ice Age temperature estimated by growth and flowering differences between subfossil and extant shoots of Cassiope tetragona, an arctic heather." Functional Ecology (1995): 650–654.
- Raillard, Martin C., and Josef Svoboda. "Exact growth and increased nitrogen compensation by the Arctic sedge Carex aquatilis var. stans after simulated grazing." Arctic, Antarctic, and Alpine Research 31, no. 1 (1999): 21–26.
- Mawson, Bruce T., Josef Svoboda, and Raymond W. Cummins. "Thermal acclimation of photosynthesis by the arctic plant Saxifraga cernua." Canadian Journal of Botany 64, no. 1 (1986): 71–76.
