= Jean-Marc Piotte =

Canadian philosopher and sociologist (1940–2022)

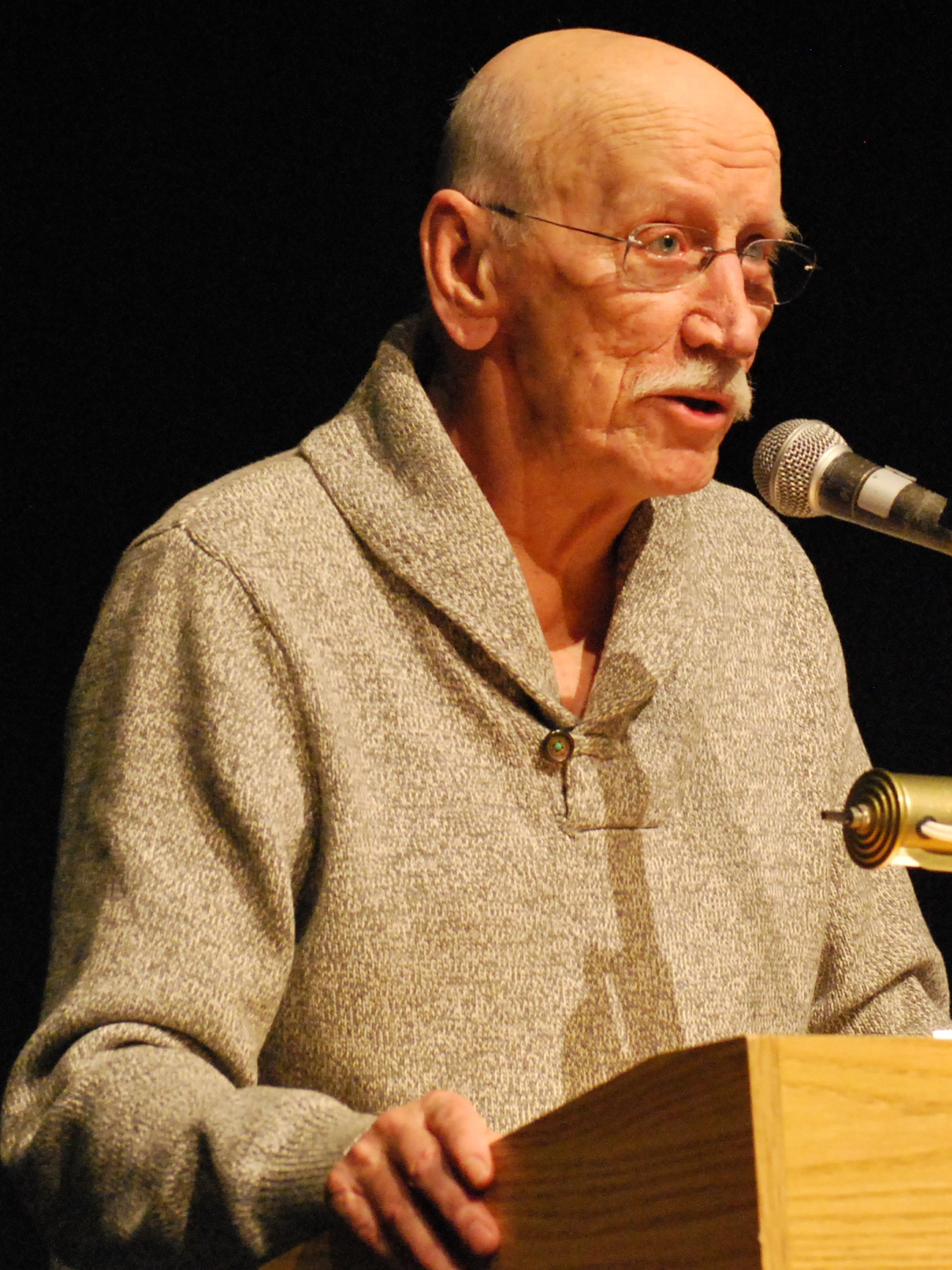
- Piotte in 2013
- Born: 4 October 1940; Montreal, Quebec, Canada
- Died: 11 February 2022 (aged 81)
- Education: Université de Montréal
- Occupations: Philosopher; Professor

Jean-Marc Piotte (4 October 1940 – 11 February 2022) was a Canadian philosopher, sociologist, political scientist, and academic.

== Biography ==
From a young age, Piotte was influenced by the rigid religious, educational, and societal norms he grew up with. This led him to question established authority. In 1960, at age 20, he began challenging societal conventions and became a nonconformist.

After his studies in philosophy at the Université de Montréal, Piotte earned a doctorate in sociology from the School for Advanced Studies in the Social Sciences with a thesis on the political thought of Antonio Gramsci. He was a member of the founding committee of the journal Parti pris. He then became director of the political science department at the Université du Québec à Montréal (UQAM), President of the Syndicat des enseignants de l'Université du Québec à Montréal, and vice-president of the National Federation of Teachers of Quebec.

Piotte was a secondary school French teacher and a philosophy professor at CEGEP in addition to his career at UQAM. From 2003 to 2006, he gave a political science seminar at Saint Joseph University in Beirut. He was the author of several books ethical and political philosophy, Marxism, syndicalism, and modernity.

He died from a heart attack on 11 February 2022, at the age of 81.

== Books ==
- La pensée politique de Gramsci (1970)
- Québec occupé (1971)
- Sur Lénine (1972)
- La lutte syndicale (chez les enseignants) (1973)
- Portraits du voyage (1974)
- Les travailleurs contre l'État bourgeois (1975)
- Le syndicalisme de combat (1977)
- Marxisme et pays socialistes (1979)
- La communauté perdue (1987)
- Sens et politique (1990)
- Les grands penseurs du monde occidental (1997)
- Du combat au partenariat. Interventions critiques sur le syndicalisme québécois (1998)
- Les Neuf Clés de la modernité (2001)
- ADQ : à droite toute ! Le programme de l’ADQ expliqué (2003)
- Au bout de l'impasse, à gauche. Récits de vie militante et perspectives d'avenir (2007)
- Un certain espoir (2008)
- Le Québec en quête de laïcité (2011)
- Une amitié improbable. Correspondance 1963-1972 avec Pierre Vadeboncœur (2012)
- Les Nouveaux Visages du nationalisme conservateur au Québec (2012)
- Démocratie des urnes et démocratie de la rue. Regard sur la société et la politique (2013)
- La Révolution des mœurs. Comment les baby-boomers ont changé le Québec (2016)
