= Denis Berthiaume =

Canadian academic and researcher (1969–2022)

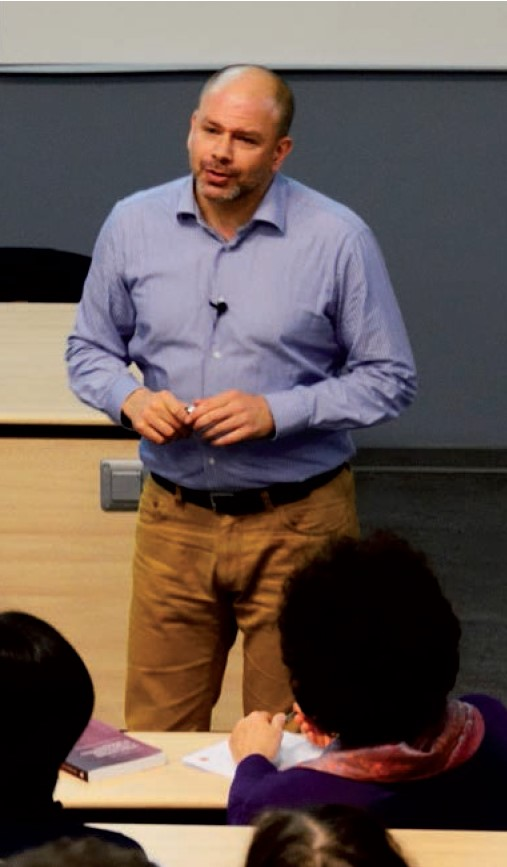
- Berthiaume in 2015
- Born: 1969; Sherbrooke, Quebec, Canada
- Died: 2 September 2022 (aged 52–53)
- Education: Laval University; McGill University
- Occupation(s): Professor; Researcher
- Scientific career
- Thesis: What is the nature of university professors' discipline-specific pedagogical knowledge? A descriptive multicase study (2007)

Denis Berthiaume (1969 – 2 September 2022) was a Canadian academic and researcher. He taught education psychology and specialized in higher education studies at the Université de l'Ontario français.

== Biography ==
Berthiaume was born in 1969 in Sherbrooke, Quebec. He studied at Laval University and McGill University, earning degrees in 1993, 2001, 2007, and 2011. From 1999 to 2006, he was an educational adviser at McGill University and served the same position at the University of Lausanne from 2006 to 2012.

In 2012, Berthiaume served on the jury of French Excellence Initiative projects, led by the Agence nationale de la recherche. In March 2014, he became Vice-Rector of Quality at the University of Applied Sciences and Arts of Western Switzerland and served as academic director of the university's Certificate of Higher Education in Teaching and Learning of Higher Education 2018 to July 2020. From July 2020 to August 2021, he was vice-rector for studies and research at the Université de l'Ontario français, a position he left for health-related reasons.

Berthiaume was diagnosed with a brain tumor and colorectal cancer in 2021, and died from assisted suicide on 2 September 2022.

== Distinctions ==
- Award of Excellence from the International Council for Educational Development (2018)

== Publications ==
- La pédagogie de l'enseignement supérieur: repères théoriques et applications pratiques: Tome 1: Enseigner au supérieur (2013)
- La Pédagogie De L'enseignement Superieur: Repères Theoriques Et Applications Pratiques; Se Developper Au Titre D’enseignant (2015)
- La pédagogie inversée: Enseigner autrement dans le supérieur par la classe inversée (2016)
- Comment évaluer les apprentissages dans l’enseignement supérieur professionnalisant? (2017)
