= Peter Ascherl =

German-Canadian ice hockey player (1953–2022)

- Born: 7 June 1953 Toronto, Ontario, Canada
- Died: 5 June 2022 (aged 68) Canada
- Height: 185 cm (6 ft 1 in)
- Weight: 84 kg (185 lb; 13 st 3 lb)
- Position: Forward
- Played for: Cambridge Hornets; Mannheimer ERC; Kölner EC; Eintracht Frankfurt; Düsseldorfer EG
- Playing career: 1974–1984

Peter Ascherl (7 June 1953 – 5 June 2022) was a German-Canadian ice hockey player. He played as a forward in the Eishockey-Bundesliga for Mannheimer ERC, Kölner EC, Eintracht Frankfurt, and Düsseldorfer EG.

== Biography ==
Ascherl began his career in Canada with the Cambridge Hornets of the OHA Senior A League. In 1979, he joined Mannheim ERC after an invite from coach Heinz Weisenbach. During his three seasons at Mannheim, he scored 125 points while playing in 124 games, including 68 goals. He also won a German ice hockey championship with the club in 1980. In 1982, he joined Cologne EC and scored 20 points in the regular season. After a season with Eintracht Frankfurt of the 2nd Bundesliga, he played for Düsseldorfer EG, where he scored nine points during the regular season and subsequently retired from playing ice hockey.

Having studied law at Heidelberg University, Ascherl became a lawyer in Canada after his retirement, specializing in German law. His son, Pierre-Christof Ascherl, also became an ice hockey player and won the German Junior Championships in 2019 with Jungadlern Mannheim.

Peter Ascherl died on 5 June 2022 at the age of 68.
