= David G. Barber =

Canadian environmental scientist and academic (1960–2022)

- Born: 28 November 1960; Dauphin, Manitoba (Canada)
- Died: 15 April 2022 (age 61)
- Education: University of Manitoba; University of Waterloo
- Known for: leadership in environmental science and contributions to the study of Arctic sea ice processes
- Awards: Order of Canada
- Scientific career
- Workplaces: University of Manitoba
- Thesis: Assessment of the Interaction of Solar Radiation (0.3 to 3.0 μm) with a Seasonally Dynamic Sea Ice Volume, from Microwave (2.0 to 5.0 cm) Scattering
- Academic advisors: Ellsworth LeDrew

David George Barber, OC FRSC (28 November 1960 – 15 April 2022) was a Canadian environmental scientist and academic known for his contributions to Arctic science, in particular the study of Arctic sea ice processes. He held the Canada Research Chair in Arctic-System Science at the University of Manitoba. He was an officer of the Order of Canada and a fellow of the Royal Society of Canada.

== Biography ==
Barber obtained his bachelor's (1981) and master's (1987) degrees from the University of Manitoba, and his Ph.D. (1992) in Arctic climatology from the University of Waterloo. He started his academic career teaching at the University of Manitoba in 1993. He received a Canada Research Chair in Arctic System Science in 2002 at the University of Manitoba. He was also Associate Dean (Research), as well as Director of the Centre for Earth Observation Science, in the Faculty of Environment, Earth, and Resources.

Barber was married to Lucette. The couple had three children. Barber died on 15 April 2022 following complications from cardiac arrest.

=== Research ===
Barber's research focused on studying the effects of climate change on the arctic sea ice, and development of tools to study its harmful effects. His early work for Fisheries and Oceans Canada studied marine mammal habitat detection and change in the Arctic. He used technologies including geographic information systems, remote sensing, and mathematical modelling to study linkages between the atmosphere, ocean, and ice, and connecting the same to people and their habitats. He showed that some apparently frozen sea ice was in fact porous and fragile "rotten ice", and studied the effects of its presence on Arctic food chains.

He led the development of many arctic research projects including the Canadian Arctic Shelf Exchange Study (CASES), Network of Centres of Excellence ArcticNet, and the Hudson Bay System Study (BaySys). At the University of Manitoba, he also led industry-academia outreach programs including one with Manitoba Hydro. Barber also contributed to arctic research infrastructure including CCGS Amundsen, a research vessel and icebreaker, and setup of the Churchill Marine Observatory.

=== Honours ===
Barber was made an Officer of the Order of Canada in 2016. The citation accompanying the award, called him one of Canada's most influential arctic researchers and also called out his role in expanding Canada's abilities toward detection and mitigation of transportation-related contaminant spills while contributing to policies and regulatory programs toward responding to the impact of climate change on the arctic ecosystem.

Barber was elected as a fellow of the Royal Society of Canada in 2016, and was a member of the Royal Canadian Geographical Society. He was also a recipient of the Northern Science Award for his advancement of northern research.
