= Killing of Ken Lee =

2022 stabbing in Toronto, Ontario

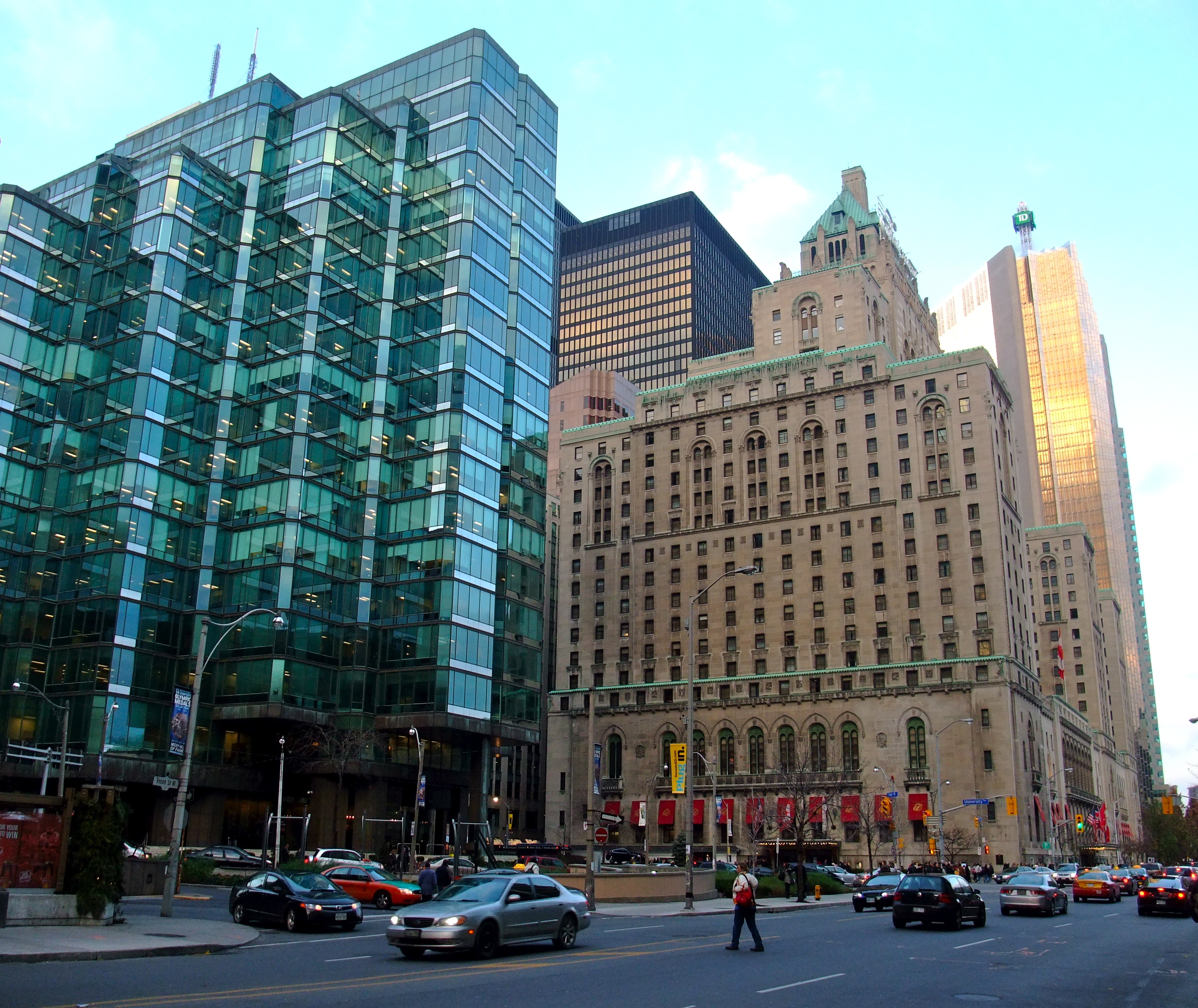
- The intersection of York Street, University Avenue and Front Street
- Location: 43.646319°N 79.382889°W; York Street, Toronto, Canada
- Date: December 18, 2022; 12:17 am (EST)
- Attack type: Stabbing
- Deaths: 1
- Victim: 1
- No. of participants: 8

During the midnight hours on December 18, 2022, 59-year-old Kenneth Lee was fatally stabbed by a group of teenage girls outside the Strathcona Hotel on York Street in Toronto, Ontario, Canada. Eight girls were initially charged with his murder. Lee's death sparked nationwide headlines across Canada.

Authorities confirmed that the perpetrators were suspected of two prior violent incidents, also in downtown Toronto, that same evening, and all were understood by police to have associated via social media, but to have not met in person prior to the evening of the attack. All of the accused were eventually convicted of various offences, including manslaughter or assault.

== Background ==
The eight suspects, according to Toronto Police Service, were engaged in two violent incidents in the hours prior to Lee's stabbing, one inside a Toronto subway train car, and the other at St. Andrew subway station.

Earlier in 2022, similar thefts that were also described as swarming attacks by police occurred in the same area of Toronto.

== Stabbing ==
The stabbing occurred at 12:17 a.m. ET on December 18, 2022, in downtown Toronto, outside the Strathcona Hotel, on the corner of York Street and University Avenue, near both Union Station and the Royal York Hotel. Strathcona Hotel was used as a shelter for homeless people during the COVID-19 pandemic.

Shortly after the two prior incidents, security cameras captured the eight girls interacting with Lee. Lee walked past the girls with his female friend. Some of the girls centered Lee's friend, who turned and attempted to walk away. One of the girls snatched her alcohol bottle, she retrieved it and took a drink. Lee walked back towards the girls before one of the girls threw something at him, and another girl punched Lee in the face.

The clashing at Lee continued as the Toronto Police Service reported that the eight teenagers allegedly swarmed Lee over a three-minute period, repeatedly kicking, punching, and stabbing him multiple times. One of the girls stabbed Lee with some small scissors. Another girl then stabbed Lee between the ribs. Bystanders summoned emergency services to just north of Union Station. Lee was transported to a nearby hospital, where he died. Various weapons were found by police near the location of the stabbing, including a small knife with a blue handle. A witness told CBC News that she was with Lee prior to the attack and that the teenage girls attempted to steal her alcoholic beverage, before Lee tried to protect her from the teenagers.

== Victim ==
Kenneth Lee (1963 – December 18, 2022), aged 59, was staying in a nearby homeless shelter. Witnesses told CTV News that Lee was visiting a friend who was living at the Strathcona Hotel shelter.

Police said that Lee was holding a liquor bottle at the time of the attack and that the theft of the alcoholic beverage was likely a motive for the attack. Police also said they do not believe the victim knew any of the attackers.

Lee was an immigrant from Hong Kong Island, and lived in Toronto for most of his life. His family described Kenneth as "a man with a kind soul and a heart of gold".

== Suspects ==
Eight girls aged between 13 and 16 years were arrested near the location of the stabbing just after midnight on the day of the attack. Three of the suspects were aged 13, three were 14, and two were 16.

According to police, the perpetrators all lived in different parts of Toronto and had only met online via social media, not in person, prior to the day of the attack. The girls lived in locations that included Scarborough, Etobicoke, downtown Toronto, and in the part of the 905 belt west of Toronto.

== Court proceedings ==
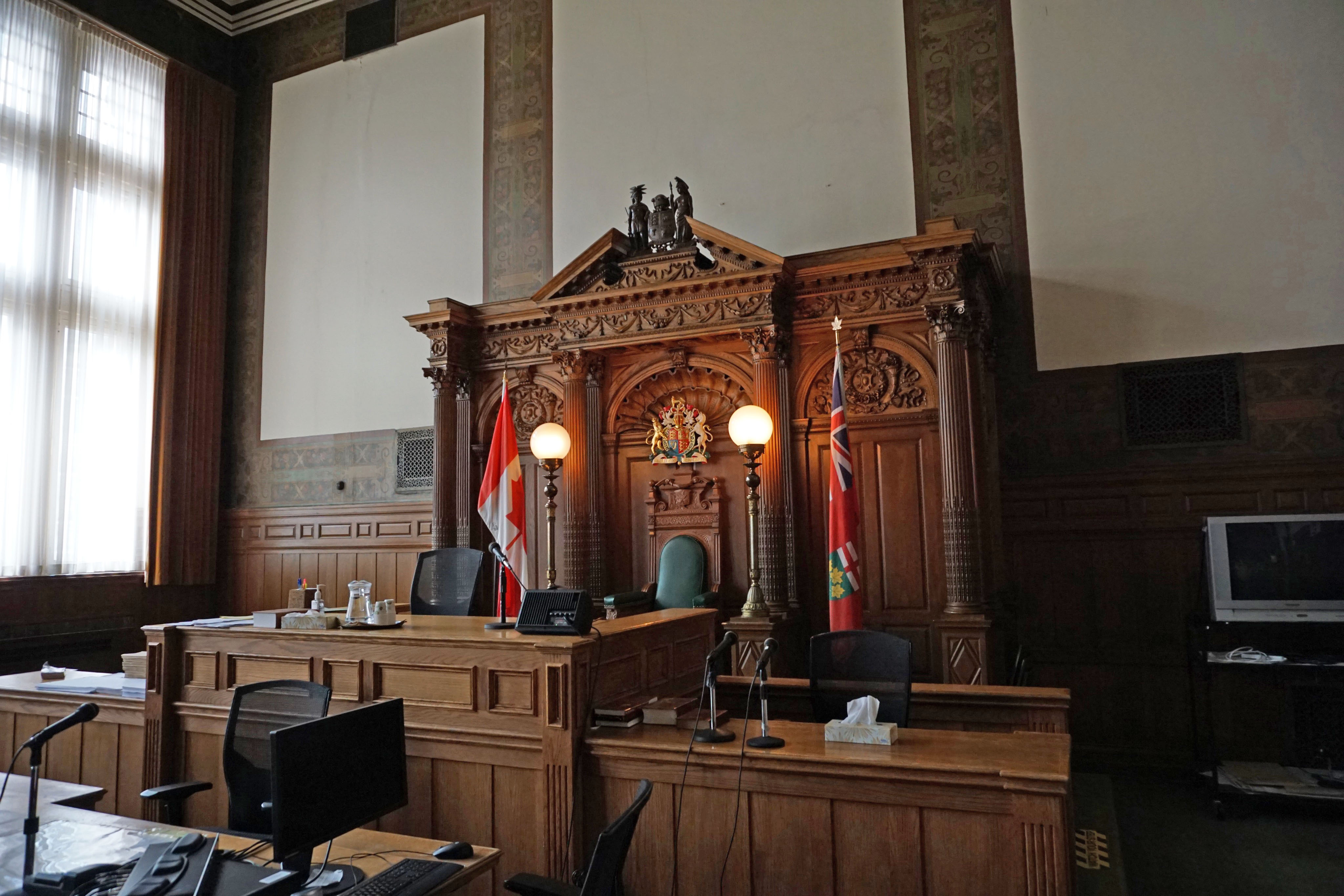
Old City Hall court

Each of the accused appeared at the Old City Hall court on the day that they were arrested. They were later each charged with second-degree murder on December 20. At a December 29 court hearing one girl was released on bail. The other seven appeared in court on January 5, 2023, via video link. A television news report by CTV News reported that "only two parents of the seven co-accused appeared to be in attendance for virtual proceedings on Zoom" and that some of the suspects seemed confused, with one of their lawyers not present during the questioning of one of the accused. By February 13, 2023, five of the suspects were released from detention on bail, while three remained detained.

Tracy Vaillancourt, a Canada Research Chair in children’s mental health and violence prevention, noting the gender and age of the suspects, described it as atypical for adolescent girls to be involved in an event that could result in a charge of murder.

Toronto Mayor John Tory said he was "deeply disturbed" by the killing. Police Detective Sergeant Terry Browne said "I've been in policing for almost 35 years and you think you've seen it all...If this isn't alarming and shocking to everyone, then we're all in trouble quite frankly."

Lee's family were critical of how the Youth Criminal Justice Act protected the identities of the eight accused child suspects.

Slightly over a year after the killing of Ken Lee, one of the eight suspects, now aged 14, was charged with allegedly stabbing another man, a 52-year-old passenger, by the exit of Wilson station in the course of an altercation. Her bail for the 2022 charges was then revoked, and she was returned to custody; later in February, the Youth Court ordered the girl transferred to an open custody centre. The reasons for the move could not be reported under the Youth Criminal Justice Act, but her lawyer was quoted criticizing strip searches at closed youth facilities.

On September 16, 2024, one of the perpetrators, who was age 13 at the time of the attack, was sentenced to 15 months of probation under an Intensive Support and Supervision Program, which is designed to accommodate those with mental health issues. Of the eight perpetrators, one was convicted of manslaughter after a trial, five pleaded guilty to manslaughter, and two others pleaded guilty to different degrees of assault.

== See also ==
- Murder of Reena Virk
- Toronto machete attack
- List of youngest killers
