= Dingucha =

Dingucha Dingu
- village
- Location in Gujarat, India Dingucha (India)
- Coordinates: 23°14′44″N 72°29′48″E
- Country: India
- State: Gujarat
- District: Gandhinagar

Population
  - Total: 3,000+

Languages
  - Official: Gujarati, Hindi, English
- Time zone: UTC+5:30 (IST)
- PIN: 382740
- Vehicle registration: GJ-18
- Nearest city: Kalol
- Avg. summer temperature: 42 °C (108 °F)
- Avg. winter temperature: 15 °C (59 °F)
- Website: www.dingucha.com

Dingucha is a village located 12 km from Kalol, Gujarat, India.

Dingucha's registered population is roughly 3,000 people. However, an estimated 1,800 of its residents have migrated to the United States or Canada in search of economic opportunities. In January 2022, a family of four from Dingucha was found at the US-Canada border having died from exposure to the extreme cold in an attempt to be smuggled across the border.
