= 6th Parliament of Lower Canada =

Parliament of Lower Canada 1810

The 6th Parliament of Lower Canada was in session from January 29, 1810, to March 1, 1810. Elections to the Legislative Assembly in Lower Canada had been held in October 1809. Lieutenant-governor James Henry Craig dissolved parliament after the assembly declared the seat of judge Pierre-Amable de Bonne vacant. A vote on the resolution which declared judges ineligible to sit in the assembly had been deferred by the Legislative Council until after the next election. All sessions were held at Quebec City.

== Members ==
Riding	Member	First elected / previously elected	No. of terms
Bedford	John Jones	1809	1st term
Buckinghamshire	François Legendre	1809	1st term
Buckinghamshire	Jean-Baptiste Hébert	1808	2nd term
Cornwallis	Joseph Le Vasseur Borgia	1808	2nd term
Cornwallis	Joseph Robitaille	1808	2nd term
Devon	Jean-Baptiste Fortin	1804	3rd term
Devon	François Bernier	1796	5th term
Dorchester	Pierre Langlois	1808	2nd term
Dorchester	Jean-Thomas Taschereau (Note: Jean-Thomas Taschereau was elected in both Dorchester and Leinster; he had not chosen which he would represent before the assembly was dissolved)	1800, 1808	3rd term*
Effingham	Joseph Duclos	1808	2nd term
Effingham	Joseph Meunier	1808	2nd term
Gaspé	George Pyke	1804	3rd term
Hampshire	Antoine-Louis Juchereau Duchesnay	1804	3rd term
Hampshire	François Huot	1796, 1808	4th term*
Hertford	François Blanchet	1809	1st term
Hertford	Étienne-Ferréol Roy	1804	3rd term
Huntingdon	Jean-Antoine Panet	1792	6th term
Huntingdon	Stephen Sewell	1809	1st term
Kent	Louis-Joseph Papineau	1808	2nd term
Kent	Pierre-Dominique Debartzch	1809	1st term
Leinster	Jean-Thomas Taschereau	1800, 1808	3rd term*
Leinster	Bonaventure Panet	1792, 1809	3rd term*
Montreal County	Jean-Baptiste Durocher	1792, (Note: Montreal West) 1808	3rd term*
Montreal County	Louis Roy Portelance	1804	3rd term
Montreal East	James Stuart	1808	2nd term
Montreal East	Joseph Papineau	1792, 1809	4th term*
Montreal West	Thomas McCord	1809	1st term
Montreal West	Denis-Benjamin Viger	1808	2nd term
Northumberland	Joseph Drapeau	1809	1st term
Northumberland	Thomas Lee	1809	1st term
Orléans	Jérôme Martineau (Note: died in December 1809)	1796	5th term
Quebec County	Pierre-Amable de Bonne (Note: expelled in February 1810)	1792	6th term
Quebec County	Ralph Gray	1809	1st term
Quebec (Lower Town)	John Jones	1808	2nd term
Quebec (Lower Town)	Pierre-Stanislas Bédard	1792	6th term
Quebec (Upper Town)	Claude Dénéchau	1808	2nd term
Quebec (Upper Town)	John Blackwood	1805	3rd term
Richelieu	Louis Bourdages	1804	3rd term
Richelieu	Hyacinthe-Marie Simon, dit Delorme	1808	2nd term
Saint-Maurice	Louis Gugy	1809	1st term
Saint-Maurice	Michel Caron	1804	3rd term
Surrey	Pierre-Stanislas Bédard (Note: also elected in Quebec (Lower Town) and chose to represent that riding)	1792	6th term
Surrey	Joseph Beauchamp	1809	1st term
Trois-Rivières	Joseph Badeaux	1808	2nd term
Trois-Rivières	Mathew Bell	1809	1st term
Warwick	Ross Cuthbert	1800	4th term
Warwick	James Cuthbert	1796	5th term
William-Henry	Edward Bowen	1809	1st term
York	Pierre Saint-Julien	1809	1st term
York	John Mure	1804	3rd term
