= 7th Parliament of Lower Canada =

Parliament of Lower Canada 1810–1814

The 7th Parliament of Lower Canada was in session from December 12, 1810, to March 22, 1814. Elections to the Legislative Assembly in Lower Canada had been held in March 1810. All sessions were held at Quebec City.

== Members ==
Riding	Member	First elected / previously elected	No. of terms
Bedford	Alexis Desbleds	1810	1st term
Buckinghamshire	François Legendre	1809	2nd term
Buckinghamshire	Jean-Baptiste Hébert	1808	3rd term
Cornwallis	Joseph Le Vasseur Borgia	1808	3rd term
Cornwallis	Joseph Robitaille	1808	3rd term
Devon	Jean-Baptiste Fortin	1804	4th term
Devon	François Bernier	1796	6th term
Dorchester	Pierre Langlois	1808	3rd term
Dorchester	John Caldwell (Note: resigned his seat after he was appointed to the Legislative Council in December 1811; Jean-Thomas Taschereau was elected in a by-election held in August 1812.)	1800, 1810	4th term*
Dorchester	Jean-Thomas Taschereau (1812)	1812	1st term
Effingham	Joseph Malboeuf, dit Beausoleil	1810	1st term
Effingham	Joseph Meunier	1808	3rd term
Gaspé	George Pyke	1804	4th term
Hampshire	François-Xavier Larue	1810	1st term
Hampshire	François Huot	1796, 1808	5th term*
Hertford	François Blanchet	1809	2nd term
Hertford	Étienne-Ferréol Roy	1804	4th term
Huntingdon	Jean-Antoine Panet	1792	7th term
Huntingdon	Edme Henry	1810	1st term
Kent	Louis-Joseph Papineau	1808	3rd term
Kent	Pierre-Dominique Debartzch (Note: named to Legislative Council in January 1814)	1809	2nd term
Leinster	Jacques Archambault	1810	1st term
Leinster	Denis-Benjamin Viger	1808	3rd term
Montreal County	Jean-Baptiste Durocher (Note: died in July 1811; James Stuart was elected in a by-election held in December 1811.)	1792, (Note: Montreal West) 1808	4th term*
Montreal County	James Stuart (1811)	1808, (Note: Montreal East) 1811	2nd term*
Montreal County	Louis Roy Portelance	1804	4th term
Montreal East	Stephen Sewell	1809	2nd term
Montreal East	Joseph Papineau	1792	7th term
Montreal West	Étienne Nivard Saint-Dizier	1810	1st term
Montreal West	Archibald Norman McLeod	1810	1st term
Northumberland	Joseph Drapeau (Note: died in November 1810; Augustin Caron was elected in a by-election held in January 1811.)	1809	2nd term
Northumberland	Augustin Caron (1811)	1811	1st term
Northumberland	Thomas Lee	1809	2nd term
Orléans	Charles Blouin	1810	1st term
Quebec County	Louis Gauvreau	1810	1st term
Quebec County	Jean-Baptiste Bédard	1810	1st term
Quebec (Lower Town)	Pierre Bruneau	1810	1st term
Quebec (Lower Town)	John Mure	1804	4th term
Quebec (Upper Town)	Claude Dénéchau	1808	3rd term
Quebec (Upper Town)	James Irvine	1810	1st term
Richelieu	Louis Bourdages	1804	4th term
Richelieu	Hyacinthe-Marie Simon, dit Delorme (Note: died in March 1814)	1808	3rd term
Saint-Maurice	François Caron	1810	1st term
Saint-Maurice	Michel Caron	1804	4th term
Surrey	Pierre-Stanislas Bédard (Note: resigned to accept a post as judge in December 1812; Pierre Amiot was elected in a by-election held in January 1813.)	1792	7th term
Surrey	Pierre Amiot (1813)	1813	1st term
Surrey	Joseph Bédard	1800, (Note: York) 1814	2nd term*
Trois-Rivières	Thomas Coffin	1792, (Note: Saint-Maurice) 1808, 1810	5th term*
Trois-Rivières	Mathew Bell	1809	2nd term
Warwick	Louis Olivier	1810	1st term
Warwick	James Cuthbert (Note: named to the Legislative Council in December 1811; Ross Cuthbert was elected in a by-election held in August 1812.)	1796	6th term
Warwick	Ross Cuthbert (1812)	1800, 1812	5th term*
William-Henry	Edward Bowen (Note: resigned his seat to accept an appointment as judge in May 1812; Jacob Pozer was elected in a by-election held in December 1812.)	1809	2nd term
William-Henry	Jacob Pozer (1812)	1812	1st term
York	Pierre Saint-Julien	1809	2nd term
York	François Bellet	1810	1st term
