= 5th Parliament of Lower Canada =

Parliament of Lower Canada 1809

The 5th Parliament of Lower Canada was in session from April 10, 1809, to May 18, 1809. Elections to the Legislative Assembly in Lower Canada had been held in May 1808. Lieutenant-governor James Henry Craig prorogued the house following the expulsion of Ezekiel Hart by the assembly and the introduction of a bill barring judges from becoming members of the house; he also hoped to reduce representation by the Parti canadien in the election that would follow. All sessions were held at Quebec City.

== Members ==
Riding	Member	First elected / previously elected	No. of terms
Bedford	William Sturge Moore	1805	2nd term
Buckinghamshire	Louis Legendre	1808	1st term
Buckinghamshire	Jean-Baptiste Hébert	1808	1st term
Cornwallis	Joseph Le Vasseur Borgia	1808	1st term
Cornwallis	Joseph Robitaille	1808	1st term
Devon	Jean-Baptiste Fortin	1804	2nd term
Devon	François Bernier	1796	4th term
Dorchester	Pierre Langlois	1808	1st term
Dorchester	John Caldwell	1800	3rd term
Effingham	Joseph Duclos	1808	1st term
Effingham	Joseph Meunier	1808	1st term
Gaspé	George Pyke	1804	2nd term
Hampshire	Antoine-Louis Juchereau Duchesnay	1804	2nd term
Hampshire	François Huot	1796, 1808	3rd term*
Hertford	Louis Turgeon	1804	2nd term
Hertford	Étienne-Ferréol Roy	1804	2nd term
Huntingdon	Jean-Antoine Panet	1792	5th term
Huntingdon	Ignace-Michel-Louis-Antoine d'Irumberry de Salaberry	1792, (Note: Dorchester) 1804	3rd term*
Kent	Louis-Joseph Papineau	1808	1st term
Kent	Joseph-Bernard Planté	1796	4th term
Leinster	Joseph-Édouard Faribault	1808	1st term
Leinster	Joseph Turgeon	1808	1st term
Montreal County	Jean-Baptiste Durocher	1792, (Note: Montreal West) 1808	2nd term*
Montreal County	Louis Roy Portelance	1804	2nd term
Montreal East	James Stuart	1808	1st term
Montreal East	Jean-Marie Mondelet	1804	2nd term
Montreal West	William McGillivray	1808	1st term
Montreal West	Denis-Benjamin Viger	1808	1st term
Northumberland	Augustin Caron	1808	1st term
Northumberland	Jean-Marie Poulin	1800	3rd term
Orléans	Jérôme Martineau	1796	4th term
Quebec County	Pierre-Amable de Bonne	1792	5th term
Quebec County	Ralph Gray	1808	1st term
Quebec (Lower Town)	John Jones	1808	1st term
Quebec (Lower Town)	Pierre-Stanislas Bédard	1792	5th term
Quebec (Upper Town)	Claude Dénéchau	1808	1st term
Quebec (Upper Town)	John Blackwood	1805	2nd term
Richelieu	Louis Bourdages	1804	2nd term
Richelieu	Hyacinthe-Marie Simon, dit Delorme	1808	1st term
Saint-Maurice	Thomas Coffin	1792, 1808	4th term*
Saint-Maurice	Michel Caron	1804	2nd term
Surrey	Jacques Cartier	1804	2nd term
Surrey	Paschal Chagnon	1808	1st term
Trois-Rivières	Joseph Badeaux	1808	1st term
Trois-Rivières	Ezekiel Hart (Note: expelled on May 5, 1809, by a vote of the assembly)	1807	2nd term
Warwick	Ross Cuthbert	1800	3rd term
Warwick	James Cuthbert	1796	4th term
William-Henry	Jonathan Sewell (Note: resigned to become Chief Judge of Lower Canada in August 1808)	1796	4th term
York	Jean-Joseph Trestler	1808	1st term
York	John Mure	1804	2nd term
