= 3rd Parliament of Lower Canada =

Parliament of Lower Canada 1801–1804

The 3rd Parliament of Lower Canada was in session from January 8, 1801, to June 13, 1804. Elections to the Legislative Assembly in Lower Canada had been held in June 1800. All sessions were held at Quebec City.

== Members ==
Riding	Member	First elected / previously elected	No. of terms
Bedford	John Steel	1800	1st term
Buckinghamshire	John Craigie	1796	2nd term
Buckinghamshire	Louis Gouin	1800	1st term
Cornwallis	Joseph Boucher	1800	1st term
Cornwallis	Alexandre Menut	1796	2nd term
Devon	Jean-Bernard Pelletier	1800	1st term
Devon	François Bernier	1796	2nd term
Dorchester	Jean-Thomas Taschereau	1800	1st term
Dorchester	John Caldwell	1800	1st term
Effingham	André Nadon	1800	1st term
Effingham	Charles-Jean-Baptiste Bouc (Note: expelled in January 1801 and reelected in March 1801, expelled later that month and reelected in April 1801, expelled in March 1802; Angus Shaw was elected in a by-election held in April 1802.)	1796	2nd term
Effingham	Angus Shaw (1802)	1802	1st term
Gaspé	William Vondenvelden	1800	1st term
Hampshire	François Huot	1796	2nd term
Hampshire	Joseph-Bernard Planté	1796	2nd term
Hertford	Michel Tellier	1800	1st term
Hertford	Louis Blais	1800	1st term
Huntingdon	Joseph-François Perrault	1796	2nd term
Huntingdon	Jean-Baptiste Raymond	1800	1st term
Kent	François Viger	1800	1st term
Kent	Antoine Ménard, dit Lafontaine	1796	2nd term
Leinster	Jean Archambault	1800	1st term
Leinster	Louis-Marie-Joseph Beaumont	1800	1st term
Montreal County	Joseph Papineau	1792	3rd term
Montreal County	Thomas Walker	1800	1st term
Montreal East	Pierre-Louis Panet	1792, (Note: Cornwallis) 1800	2nd term*
Montreal East	Francis Badgley	1800	1st term
Montreal West	James McGill	1800	1st term
Montreal West	Joseph Périnault	1800	1st term
Northumberland	Pierre-Stanislas Bédard	1792	3rd term
Northumberland	Jean-Marie Poulin	1800	1st term
Orléans	Jérôme Martineau	1796	2nd term
Quebec County	Louis Paquet	1796	2nd term
Quebec County	Michel-Amable Berthelot Dartigny	1800	1st term
Quebec (Lower Town)	Robert Lester	1792, 1800	2nd term*
Quebec (Lower Town)	John Young	1792	3rd term
Quebec (Upper Town)	Jean-Antoine Panet	1792	3rd term
Quebec (Upper Town)	Augustin-Jérôme Raby	1796	2nd term
Richelieu	Louis-Édouard Hubert	1800	1st term
Richelieu	Charles Benoit Livernois	1800	1st term
Saint-Maurice	Thomas Coffin	1792	3rd term
Saint-Maurice	Mathew Bell	1800	1st term
Surrey	François Lévesque	1800	1st term
Surrey	Philippe-François de Rastel de Rocheblave (Note: died in April 1802; Alexis Caron was elected in a by-election held in 1802.)	1792	3rd term
Surrey	Alexis Caron (1802)	1802	1st term
Trois-Rivières	John Lees	1792	3rd term
Trois-Rivières	Pierre-Amable de Bonne	1792	3rd term
Warwick	Ross Cuthbert	1800	1st term
Warwick	James Cuthbert	1796	2nd term
William-Henry	Jonathan Sewell	1796	2nd term
York	Louis-Charles Foucher	1800	1st term
York	Joseph Bédard	1800	1st term
