= 2nd Parliament of Lower Canada =

Parliament of Lower Canada 1797–1800

The 2nd Parliament of Lower Canada was in session from January 24, 1797, to June 4, 1800. Elections to the Legislative Assembly in Lower Canada had been held in June 1796. All sessions were held at Quebec City.

== Members ==
| Riding | Member | First elected | No. of terms |
|---|---|---|---|
| Bedford | Nathaniel Coffin | 1796 | 1st term |
| Buckinghamshire | John Craigie | 1796 | 1st term |
| Buckinghamshire | George Waters Allsopp | 1796 | 1st term |
| Cornwallis | Paschal Sirois-Duplessis (Note: died in November 1797; Pascal Taché was elected in a by-election held in March 1798.) | 1796 | 1st term |
| Cornwallis | Pascal Taché (1798) | 1798 | 1st term |
| Cornwallis | Alexandre Menut | 1796 | 1st term |
| Devon | Nicolas Dorion | 1796 | 1st term |
| Devon | François Bernier | 1796 | 1st term |
| Dorchester | Charles Bégin | 1796 | 1st term |
| Dorchester | Alexandre Dumas | 1796 | 1st term |
| Effingham | Jacob Jordan | 1796 | 1st term |
| Effingham | Charles-Jean-Baptiste Bouc (Note: expelled from the assembly in April 1800 after conviction for fraud) | 1796 | 1st term |
| Gaspé | Edward O'Hara | 1792 | 2nd term |
| Hampshire | François Huot | 1796 | 1st term |
| Hampshire | Joseph-Bernard Planté | 1796 | 1st term |
| Hertford | Louis-François Dunière | 1796 | 1st term |
| Hertford | Félix Têtu | 1796 | 1st term |
| Huntingdon | Joseph-François Perrault | 1796 | 1st term |
| Huntingdon | Joseph Périnault | 1796 | 1st term |
| Kent | Jacques Viger (Note: died in January 1798; Michel-Amable Berthelot Dartigny was elected in a by-election held in March 1798) | 1796 | 1st term |
| Kent | Michel-Amable Berthelot Dartigny (1798) | 1798 | 1st term |
| Kent | Antoine Ménard, dit Lafontaine | 1796 | 1st term |
| Leinster | Joseph Viger | 1796 | 1st term |
| Leinster | Bonaventure Panet | 1796 | 1st term |
| Montreal County | Jean-Marie Ducharme | 1796 | 1st term |
| Montreal County | Étienne Guy | 1796 | 1st term |
| Montreal East | Joseph Papineau | 1792 | 2nd term |
| Montreal East | Denis Viger | 1796 | 1st term |
| Montreal West | Alexander Auldjo | 1796 | 1st term |
| Montreal West | Louis-Charles Foucher | 1796 | 1st term |
| Northumberland | Pierre-Stanislas Bédard | 1792 | 2nd term |
| Northumberland | James Fisher | 1796 | 1st term |
| Orléans | Jérôme Martineau | 1796 | 1st term |
| Quebec County | John Black | 1796 | 1st term |
| Quebec County | Louis Paquet | 1796 | 1st term |
| Quebec (Lower Town) | Augustin-Jérôme Raby | 1796 | 1st term |
| Quebec (Lower Town) | John Young | 1792 | 2nd term |
| Quebec (Upper Town) | Jean-Antoine Panet | 1792 | 2nd term |
| Quebec (Upper Town) | William Grant | 1792 | 2nd term |
| Richelieu | Charles Hus, dit Millet | 1796 | 1st term |
| Richelieu | Benjamin-Hyacinthe-Martin Cherrier | 1792 | 2nd term |
| Saint-Maurice | Thomas Coffin | 1792 | 2nd term |
| Saint-Maurice | Nicholas Montour | 1796 | 1st term |
| Surrey | Olivier Durocher | 1796 | 1st term |
| Surrey | Philippe-François de Rastel de Rocheblave | 1792 | 2nd term |
| Trois-Rivières | John Lees | 1792 | 2nd term |
| Trois-Rivières | Pierre-Amable de Bonne | 1796 | 1st term |
| Warwick | Charles-Gaspard Tarieu de Lanaudière | 1796 | 1st term |
| Warwick | James Cuthbert | 1796 | 1st term |
| William-Henry | Jonathan Sewell | 1796 | 1st term |
| York | Joseph-Hubert Lacroix | 1792 | 2nd term |
| York | Joseph Éthier | 1796 | 1st term |
