= Saint-Ours =

Saint-Ours may refer to the following:

== People ==
- Saint Ours, 5th-century French bishop of Toul
- Jean-Pierre Saint-Ours (1752–1809), Swiss painter
- Charles de Saint-Ours (1753–1834), seigneur and political figure in Lower Canada
- François-Roch de Saint-Ours (1800–1839), son of the last, political figure in Lower Canada
- Saint-Ours, used as a pen name by the French writer Achille-Claude Clarac in 1973

== Places ==
- Saint-Ours is the short name in French for the collégiale de Saint-Ours in Aosta, Italy
- Saint-Ours (Fribourg), French name for St. Ursen, a municipality in Switzerland
- Saint-Ours, Puy-de-Dôme, a commune in the Puy-de-Dôme department, France
- Saint-Ours, Quebec, a town in Canada
- Saint-Ours, Savoie, a commune in the Savoie department, France
- Canton of Saint-Ours, a canton of the Puy-de-Dôme department in France
