= François-Roch de Saint-Ours =

Canadian politician (1800–1839)

François-Roch de Saint-Ours (September 18, 1800 – September 10, 1839) was a seigneur and political figure in Lower Canada. He represented Richelieu in the Legislative Assembly of Lower Canada from 1824 to 1832.

He was born Roc-François de Saint-Ours in Saint-Ours, Lower Canada, the son of seigneur Charles de Saint-Ours and Josephte Murray. Saint-Ours was lieutenant and then colonel in the local militia. In 1830, he was named commissioner for improving navigation on the Richelieu River. In 1832, he resigned his seat in the legislative assembly after he was named to the Legislative Council of Lower Canada. He married Catherine-Hermine Juchereau Duchesnay, the granddaughter of Antoine Juchereau Duchesnay and Ignace-Michel-Louis-Antoine d'Irumberry de Salaberry, in 1833. In 1837, Saint-Ours was named sheriff for Montreal. He died there at the age of 38.

His daughter Henriette-Amélie married Joseph-Adolphe Dorion and his daughter Caroline-Virginie married Alexandre-Édouard Kierzkowski. His sister Josette married Pierre-Dominique Debartzch.
