= Olivier Durocher =

Olivier Durocher may refer to:

- Olivier Durocher (Ontario politician)
- Olivier Durocher (Quebec politician)
