= Lewis Beaumont (disambiguation) =

Lewis Beaumont (1847–1922) was a Royal Navy officer.

Lewis or Louis Beaumont may also refer to:

- Sir Lewis Beaumont, 5th Baronet (c. 1673–1738) of the Beaumont baronets
- Lewis de Beaumont (died 1333), bishop of Durham
- Louis de Beaumont, 2nd Count de Lerín (c. 1430–1508), noble in the Kingdom of Navarre
- Louis-Marie-Joseph Beaumont (1753–1828), Canadian farmer and political figure

== See also ==
- Beaumont (surname)
