= Jacques Dorion =

Canadian politician (1797-1877)

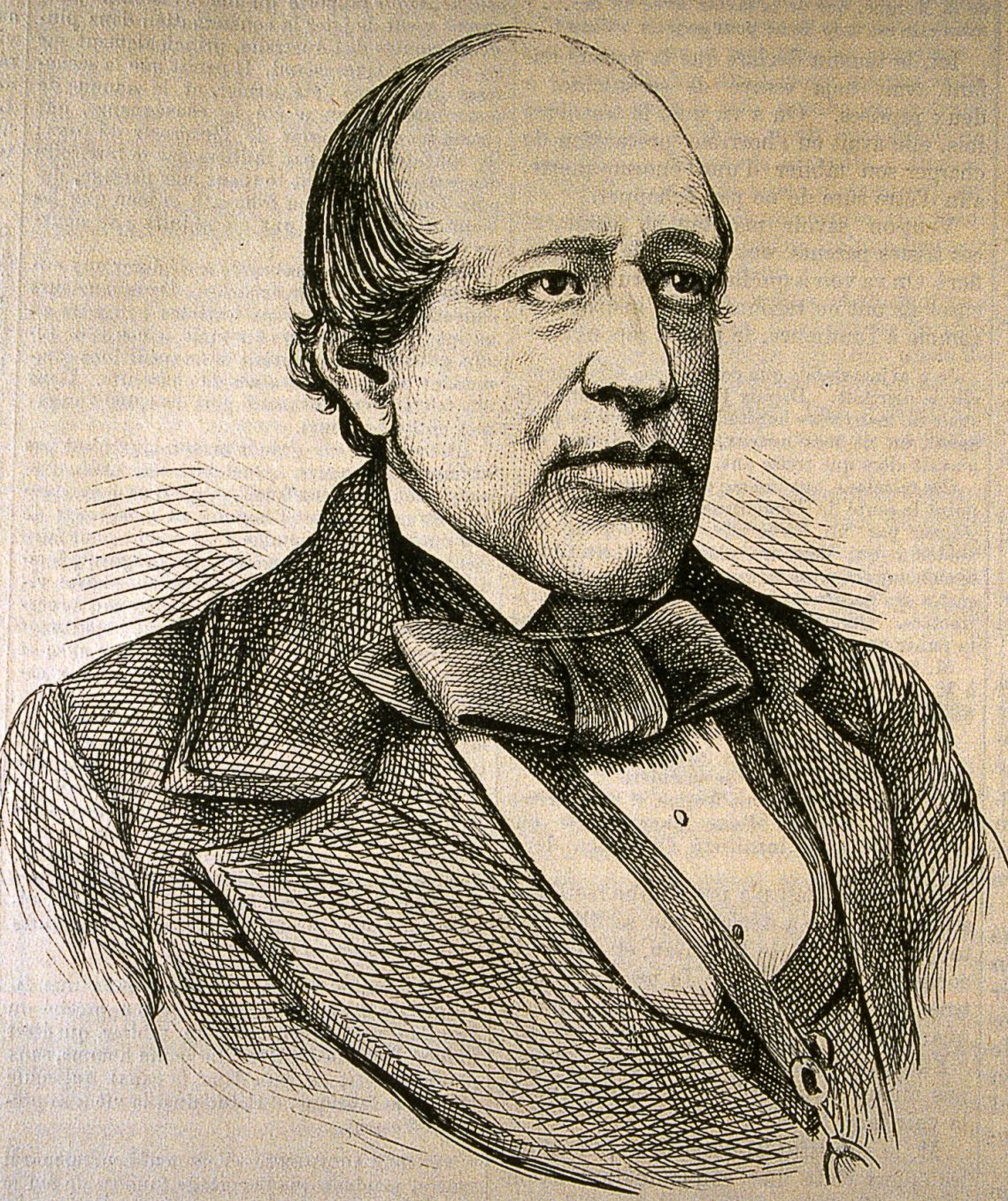
- Dr. Jacques Dorion
- Born: 1797; Quebec City
- Died: December 29, 1877 (aged 79–80)
- Education: Petit Séminaire de Québec
- Occupations: Medical doctor; Politician
- Spouse: Catherine-Louise Lovell

Jacques Dorion (ca 1797 – December 29, 1877) was a medical doctor and political figure in Lower Canada.

Dorion was born at Quebec City on November 22, 1798, the illegitimate son of merchant Paul Dorion and an unknown mother. Studied at the Petit Séminaire de Québec. Dorion studied medicine at Paris. Although tradition holds that he studied medicine in Paris under Guillaume Dupuytren and Xavier Bichat, his name does not appear in the registration records or the list of graduates of the University of Paris's medical faculty; he was likely one of about fifteen Canadians who studied medicine in Paris between 1816 and 1822. He practised medicine at Saint-Ours for more than 55 years. And returned to set up practice at Saint-Ours. In 1824, he married Catherine-Louise Lovell, niece of seigneur Charles-Louis-Roch de Saint-Ours. Dorion was elected to the Legislative Assembly of Lower Canada for Richelieu in 1830 and was reelected in 1834, as a supporter of the parti patriote. Dorion signed the Ninety-Two Resolutions. He founded a branch of the Saint-Jean-Baptiste Society at Saint-Ours in 1835. In December 1837, he was arrested for high treason and imprisoned until March 1838.

He died at Saint-Ours on December 30, 1877, and was buried on January 1, 1878, in the cemetery of the parish of L'Immaculée-Conception-de-Saint-Ours.

One son, Joseph-Adolphe, later served in the Quebec legislative assembly, and another son, Eugène-Philippe, was head of the French translators for the Canadian House of Commons.
