= Joseph-Adolphe Dorion =

Canadian politician

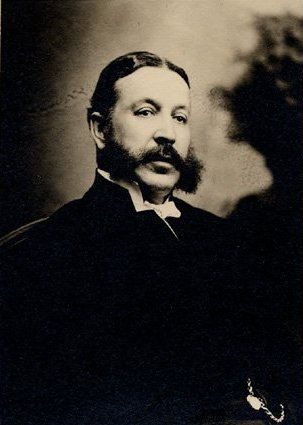
Joseph-Adolphe Dorion

Joseph-Adolphe Dorion (March 19, 1832 – October 24, 1900) was a notary and political figure in Quebec. He represented Richelieu in the Legislative Assembly of Quebec from 1871 to 1875 as a Conservative.

He was born in Saint-Ours, Lower Canada, the son of Jacques Dorion and Catherine-Louise Lovell. He was educated at the Séminaire de Saint-Hyacinthe and the Collège de Joliette. He was admitted to practice in 1863 and settled at Saint-Ours. Dorion was also justice of the peace, coroner, president of the Agricultural Society for Richelieu County and county treasurer. He ran unsuccessfully for a seat in the legislative assembly for the Province of Canada in 1861. In 1865, Dorion married Henriette-Amélie, the daughter of seigneur François-Roch de Saint-Ours. In 1882, he was named to the Legislative Council of Quebec for Sorel division and served there until 1897. Dorion died in Saint-Ours at the age of 68.
