= Alexandre Dumas (disambiguation) =

Alexandre Dumas (1802–1870) was a French writer best known for his historical novels of high adventure.

Alexandre Dumas may also refer to:

- Alexandre Dumas fils (1824–1895), French author and dramatist, natural son of the above
- Thomas-Alexandre Dumas (1762–1806), French general, father and grandfather of the two above, respectively
- Alexandre Dumas (merchant) (c. 1726–1802), Canadian businessman, merchant, and politician
- Alexandre Dumas station, station on Paris Metro Line 2
