= Jean-Baptiste Bédard =

Jean-Baptiste Bédard may refer to:

- Jean-Baptiste Bédard (politician) (1763–1815), politician in Lower Canada
- Jean-Baptiste Bédard (carpenter) (1761–1818), carpenter and surveyor in Lower Canada
