= Joseph Beauchamp (disambiguation) =

Joseph Beauchamp (1739–1825) was a Lower Canadian politician.

Joseph Beauchamp may also refer to:

- Joe Beauchamp (1944–2020), American football player
- Joey Beauchamp (1971–2022), English footballer
