= 1811 in Canada =

- Decades: 1790s; 1800s; 1810s; 1820s; 1830s
- See also: History of Canada; Timeline of Canadian history; List of years in Canada

Events from the year 1811 in Canada.

== Incumbents ==
- Monarch: George III

=== Federal government ===
- Parliament of Lower Canada: 7th
- Parliament of Upper Canada: 5th

=== Governors ===
- Governor of the Canadas: Robert Milnes
- Governor of New Brunswick: George Prevost
- Governor of Nova Scotia: John Wentworth
- Commodore-Governor of Newfoundland: John Thomas Duckworth
- Governor of Prince Edward Island: Joseph Frederick Wallet DesBarres

== Events ==
- John Jacob Astor's Pacific Fur Company establishes a post at mouth of the Columbia River.
- British-Canadian fur trader, surveyor, and cartographer David Thompson follows Columbia to Pacific and finishes charting entire length of the river.
- William Price Hunt, leading Astor's overland party, explores Snake River Valley and much of future Oregon Trail.
- When Governor Craig leaves for England, British Canadians detach the horses and draw his carriage to the place of embarkation.
- U.S. President James Madison, in his message to Congress, says: "We have seen the British Cabinet not only persist, in refusing satisfaction demanded for the wrongs we have already suffered, but it is extending to our own waters that blockade, which is become a virtual war against us, through a stoppage of our legitimate commerce."

== Births ==
- January 9 – John Ferris, businessman, explorer and politician (d.1884)
- March 11 – John Young, politician (d.1878)
- May 29 – William Pearce Howland, politician (d.1907)
- July 20 – James Bruce, 8th Earl of Elgin, Governor General (d.1863)
- August 16 – Luc-Hyacinthe Masson, physician, businessman and politician (d.1880)
- October 6 – Eulalie Durocher, catholic nun (d.1849)
- December 2 – Jean-Charles Chapais, Conservative politician considered a Father of Canadian Confederation for his participation in the Quebec Conference to determine the form of Canada's government (d.1885)

=== Full date unknown ===
- Isabella Clark, first wife of John A. Macdonald, premier of the Province of Canada (d.1857)

== Historical documents ==
"The iniquity of the [slave] trade is now publickly acknowledged by all parties;" it requires "a speedy and vigorous attempt to indemnify" them

In addition to economic penalties, Parliament has made slave traders subject to 5 years' imprisonment at hard labour or 14 years' transportation

Colonization is easier to get into than out of for "a great nation;" thus Britain pays more annually for Canada and Nova Scotia than they are worth

Trade is greatly increased between British ports and British North American colonies, which "have been so long considered[...]of little value"

Pay "serious attention" to report (pg. 2) on Hudson River - Lake Erie canal; our "prospects of prosperity [may] vanish, perhaps for ever"

U.S.A. allows Bonaparte to govern his conquests but denies Britain "the right to make any laws on the ocean which we have conquered"

"If the United States[...]waged war for territory and ultimate safety, the possession of Canada would[...]be a sufficient inducement for hostility"

"Reinforcement of British Regulars in Canada" shows Britain means war; it recalls Thomas Jefferson's earlier advice to nation: "feel power and forget right"

U.S. government calls British policy toward U.S.A. "[a] blow at the independence of the U. States," as well as stabbing, violation and mockery

"Hostility in the [U.S.] administration towards Great Britain [and] the appalling demands of France[...]must issue in a British war [with] no glory or security"

House of Representatives hears foreign relations committee say that British policy "ought to be resisted by WAR"

"When Jefferson quit the chair of state / He left to Madison his cloak / Impregnated with deadly hate / Against old England's hearts of oak[....]"

Bostonians say Congress, by "coercing the only European nation with whom we have any safe or honorable intercourse," deeply wounds U.S. commerce

Though U.S. leaders are "anxious" for war, "offensive policy [toward British navy] would be madness[...]; but surely it is time to prepare for defence"

Embargo has sent U.S. citizens "pouring into the Canadas[,] proof of the folly and madness of the measures of our government"

Virginia newspaper fears "wisdom and firmness will not be a match for the prejudices and the back stairs influence" members face in Congress

News comes that 5 ships of the line and 10 frigates under command of Joseph Yorke have sailed for America

Rejected British proposals "are the last sacrifices to the spirit of conciliation which has so long prevailed in England towards the United States"

Summary of Pres. Madison's address to Congress calls his language "irritating" and his arguments regarding Great Britain "extremely insulting"

U.S. ambassador to Russia John Quincy Adams says French ambassador "hinted to me that with[...]about five thousand Frenchmen, we could easily take Canada"

Madison accepts British reparations in Chesapeake Affair

Besides Battle of Tippecanoe coverage in Kentucky newspaper is its assertion that U.S.A's "Indian war" is really with British - "Greater Savages"

George Heriot says war is "the principal occupation of mankind," with peacetime used "in multiplying, inventing and improving" weapons

British Bible society supports anyone who considers "Holy Scriptures the proper standard of faith [to spread] divine truth over all the earth"

=== Lower Canada ===
Gov. Craig's final speech to legislature laments fact that members are "divided among themselves, viewing each other with mistrust and jealousy"

New Gov. George Prevost is to tolerate "the free exercise of the Religion of the Church of Rome," but not recognize it as "an established Church"

In his sermon, Alexander Spark contrasts accepted separation of Church and State with needed link between religion and civil society

Montreal merchant has trouble recognizing his city now that most of his friends are dead and newcomers from U.S.A. are doubling its population

Quebec City firm says market in winter with low demand, wheat crop failure and scarcity of cash could mean lower rum sales, wine sales etc.

"Unprecedented scarcity of specie[...]nearly amounts to a prohibition of commerce of every description;" provincial bank would address problem

"In tenderness[...]to the distressed," farmers who consumed seed grain over winter because of last year's short harvest are facilitated to borrow more

"What is there that could subdue courage regulated by discipline, strengthened by habits of sobriety and order, and founded upon fidelity[....]"

People convicted of crimes for which punishment is burning hand or transportation or death may instead be committed to House of Correction

Reported 600 ships in Quebec taking loads of timber "will supersede in a great measure the importations from Norway or the Baltic"

Lower St. Lawrence pilots ask Assembly not to water down pilot apprenticeship law by licensing coast pilots and other mariners

Court of King's Bench judges are disqualified from election to or voting in Legislative Assembly

Legislature should examine liquor business, which is "injurious to the provincial revenue and destructive to the human constitution"

Brewer John Molson petitions Assembly for exclusive right to manufacture and operate steamboats for Montreal - Quebec City route

Quebec City - Boston stagecoach connection opens with 5-day service including stops at Hatley, Stanstead, St. Johnsbury, VT and Newbury, MA

Merchant ship crew sailing from Quebec, having lost foremast in gale, overwhelms crews of 4 attacking French privateers off southeast England

New Englander describes her Protestant friend "taking the veil" after 3 years' study in Montreal's Hôtel-Dieu "or Convent of Black Nuns"

The course structure of the Quebec City boy's school was composed of basic studies in reading and mathematics, along with advanced courses on logarithms, architecture, history, and classical Greek.

Books for small children containing "their letters and the most simple elements of science and religion" will benefit them even on frontiers

Books in Montreal Library include "Shakespeare (as now performed)," Johnson's Dictionary, Pamela, Robinson Crusoe, and Sorrows of Werter

Quebec City's ladies, gentlemen and children can learn penmanship through instruction based "upon a new, improved, elementary and systematic plan"

Editorial says street lighting in Montreal would cause "brilliancy[...]which could not fail to facinate [sic] the fair sex and induce them to make evening excursions and occasional visits to their friends"

Exhibition has more than "Twenty artificial persons at work at different branches of business;" they move "by mechanical machinery alone"

Print: Montreal seen from Mount Royal

Map: Upper and Lower Canada, from Lake Winnipeg to Lower St. Lawrence River and James Bay to New Jersey

=== Upper Canada ===
"I shall[...]facilitate as many good people into the Province as I possibly can" - Loyalist recruits people in Schenectady, N.Y. to move to U.C.

Indian Affairs department seeks "to recommend to the Indian[s] Peace and should any attack be made on them by the Americans, to retire"

"Vast superiority" of Christian religion over "that of the unfortunate Heathen [is shown by] the consolation which it gives the afflicted"

Because so many debtors leave U.C. without paying debts, sum below which arrest can be made is reduced from £10 sterling to 40s provincial currency

"Nothing weakens parental authority so much as its improper exertion" - Boarder says woman fails to discipline sons who continually oppose her

Quaker women's meeting formally disowns Mela/Mila Richmond after finding her "making herself too familiar with a man" not her husband

Quaker committee finds Jeremiah Moore "altho he may stand on the U. E. List [cannot be judged to have received] his lands for any service in war"

Boxing is bad: "The violation of law is rendered fashionable and popular, either by the passions of our nature, or the contagion of influential examples"

=== Nova Scotia ===
Provincial bank is proposed to counter loss of specie, unfavourable exchange rate with U.S.A. and necessary bartering of goods and services

Two brigs and 11 schooners from south coast will, if lucky, catch nearly 10,000 quintals for likely high demand for cod and strong West Indies market

"This is a Serious loss to the Owners & underwriters" - Brig taken by French privateer in Caribbean was underwritten £1,200 by Simeon Perkins

While primary school can be set up by people in any community, only trustees appointed by lieutenant governor can set up grammar schools

Governor Prevost tells legislators "persons with deranged minds [greatly need] the accommodation and medical aid their wretched situations [require]"

Nova Scotia and New Brunswick have "so many vulnerable Points to an invading Army that it is difficult to establish any precise Plan" for defence

Inspection of Nova Scotia Fencibles regiment finds men and officers perform well, but in inferior clothing and with arms needing repair

Trespassers on timber lot say owner has no title; producing deed, he resolves to sue more often, as his "Lenity" is taken for permissiveness

Liverpool "Over seers of the Poor" apprentice out two Blacks, "they being poor and not taken Care of by their Mothers"

Law to stop boys and others from sledding on steep Halifax streets makes underage children's parents and apprentices' masters pay 20s fine

Lawyers making full-day case out of 2-hour suit "are two Young Lawyers & wish to display their abilities and Law Learning in All the Niceties"

Deep snow in woods is "a great advantage to the people [sledding] as wood is very Scarce and Tanners have their Bark in the woods"

Many watched as Lydia Dexter (over 70 years old) and Baptist minister "walked into the water [near Liverpool, and] he Baptized her in the Name &c."

=== New Brunswick ===
Saint John charter mandates provincial governor annually to pick mayor, sheriff and coroner while freeholders elect aldermen and constables

New Brunswick Fencibles renamed 104th Regiment, making N.B. first province "that has raised a regiment of the Line for his Majesty"

Indigenous Julian family are assured government support to stop neighbors usurping their hay field on Little Southwest Branch of Miramichi River

Unmarried woman declares she has no property or income in Britain besides £33+ she receives from Treasury and £40 from insurance office annually

Edward Winslow has "a gingerbread color'd young savage boy that I have undertaken to tame[...]but he's good natur'd, tractable & honest"

=== Newfoundland ===
St. John's civic leaders ask Prince Regent to see to paving, lighting, and widening of streets, establishing market, endowing seminary, etc.

Want of specie being "very serious detriment to Trade," price of silver will rise if rates are set for "English stamped Dollar [and] Spanish Dollar"

Gov. John Duckworth approves of plan to tax each servant 1 penny per pound of their wages to help raise funds for general hospital in St. John's

Benevolent Irish Society resolves, "That considering the advanced price of Provisions," additional charitable funds should be raised

Four "Medical Practitioners" have decided to charge families "according to their different circumstances," but not less than what they previously paid

Besides lightning strike, waterspout and lunar eclipse, HMS Minerva records all-night rainbow that "celebrated Astronomer [aboard called] a Fog-bow"

B must make return visit after A pays "a complimental visit" to B, except when A is "Negro Tom; no, that would be rather too highly coloured"

Reader's thought on poetry in newspaper: "I think it shews as much as any other thing, that Literature is making progress where it is encouraged"

Print: St. John's seen from outside the Narrows, with warships and other craft in foreground

=== Western interior ===
In last of series of letters between North West Co. members and Hudson's Bay Co., HBC rejects idea that trade NWC has diverted should be conceded

"Murder" by Hudson's Bay Co. employee "far removed from the protection of Justice" leads North West Co. to seek "some arrangement" to prevent violence

"The interests of the Company and[...]the condition of the Indians are reciprocally dependent upon each other" - Northwest Company's liquor policy

Extreme cold and collapse of hare population forces North West Company men on Mackenzie River to chew hides, including 300+ beaver skins

Map: District of Assiniboia before 49th parallel was designated as international boundary

=== Hudson's Bay Company ===
Discussion of problems: supplying Indigenous people ("while we brutalize him with Brandy"), stopping fraud of chief factors, and satisfying men

"Misfortunes never come single to perfect the miseries of the poor Indians," with collapse of arctic fox, marten and ptarmigan populations

Churchill men refuse to work on HBC terms, one demanding raise to £22 from £8 and "all expectation of any one renewing his contract was given up"

HBC deserter to North West Company is told he is now "a freeman in the Country [but] would never be permitted to return to Orkney" in HBC ship

Separated from his family on winter trip and falling through ice, possibility of their starving pushes factor to advance by breaking ice with his chest

=== Elsewhere ===
Prince Edward Island has unique "time of general scarcity," with little hay, potatoes and grain "to supply four months consumption"

Moravian missionaries report some Inuit "are spiritually sick and ailing" and take refuge in customs "unbecoming the character of children of God"
