= Louis Legendre (disambiguation) =

Louis Legendre (1752–1797) was a French politician of the Revolution period.

Louis Legendre may also refer to:

- Louis Legendre (historian) (1655–1733), French historian
- Louis Legendre (Lower Canada politician) (1779–1860), land surveyor and politician in Lower Canada
- Louis Legendre (oceanographer) (born 1945), Canadian oceanographer
