= Languedoc (disambiguation) =

Languedoc is a former province of France.

Languedoc may also refer to:

== Places ==
- Languedoc-Roussillon, a former administrative region of France
- Languedoc, Western Cape, a settlement in South Africa

== People ==
- François Languedoc (1790-1840), Canadian businessman and politician
- Henri Languedoc (1885-1917), French 1st World War aviator
- Paul Languedoc, rock music sound engineer and guitar maker

== Ships ==
- French ship Languedoc (1766), a naval ship-of-the-line
- French battleship Languedoc, an uncompleted Normandie-class ship, launched in 1916
- Languedoc (2014), a French FREMM multipurpose frigate
- MV Languedoc, a French oil tanker built in 1937 and lost in 1940

== Other ==
- Languedoc (grape), an alternative name for the German/Italian Trollinger variety
- Languedoc-Roussillon wine, produced in those parts of the Occitanie region
- Languedoc, an alternative name for the French Mondeuse noire grape variety
- Langue d'oc, French name for the Occitan language
- Régiment de Languedoc, an 18th-century French Army regiment
- SNCASE Languedoc (SE.161), a French passenger aircraft built in the 1940s

== See also ==
- Languedocian dialect, an Occitan dialect spoken in rural parts of southern France
