= Livernois =

Livernois may refer to:

- The Livernois-Fenkell riot, a disturbance in Detroit (1975)
- Livernois Avenue, a street in Detroit
- Charles Benoit Livernois (1755-1840), Canadian politician
- Jules-Isaïe Benoît (1830-1865), Canadian photographer who went by the name "Livernois"
