= Louis Proulx =

Canadian politician

Louis Proulx (October 29, 1751 – March 3, 1838) was a seigneur, businessman and political figure in Lower Canada. His surname also sometimes appears as Proust or Prou.

He was born in Nicolet in 1751, the son of a farmer. He was involved in the sale of grain and trading cattle and also became owner of a ship. He also invested in property, acquiring the seigneuries of La Lussodière and Saint-François. In 1784, he married Marie-Anne Brassard, the daughter of a local wealthy farmer. Proulx was elected to the Legislative Assembly of Lower Canada for Buckingham in 1804.

He died at Nicolet in 1838.

His daughter Marie-Anne married surveyor François Legendre who also represented Buckingham in the assembly. His nephew Jean-Baptiste Proulx also represented the same area in the assembly.
