= Ramesh Nair =

Indian-born Paris-based fashion designer

- Born: 1965 (age 60–61); Kerala, India
- Education: NIFT, IFM
- Occupations: Fashion designer, Artistic Director
- Organization(s): Hermès, Moynat, Joseph Duclos, Milky Black
- Known for: Revival of heritage luxury houses

Ramesh Nair (born 1965) is a Paris-based fashion designer and artistic director. He is recognized for leading the revival of heritage luxury houses, including Moynat (2010–2020) and Joseph Duclos (2020–present).

== Early life and education ==
Nair was born in Kerala, India, into a military family. Due to his father’s service, he moved frequently during his childhood, a period he has credited with teaching him the "art of reinvention."

Nair originally pursued a scientific path, earning a degree in Zoology. He has noted that his background in dissection provided an early understanding of structural anatomy, which he later applied to the construction of leather goods. He was part of the inaugural batch of the National Institute of Fashion Technology (NIFT) in New Delhi in 1986. He later moved to Paris to complete a Master’s degree at the Institut Français de la Mode (IFM).

== Career ==
=== Hermès (2000–2010) ===
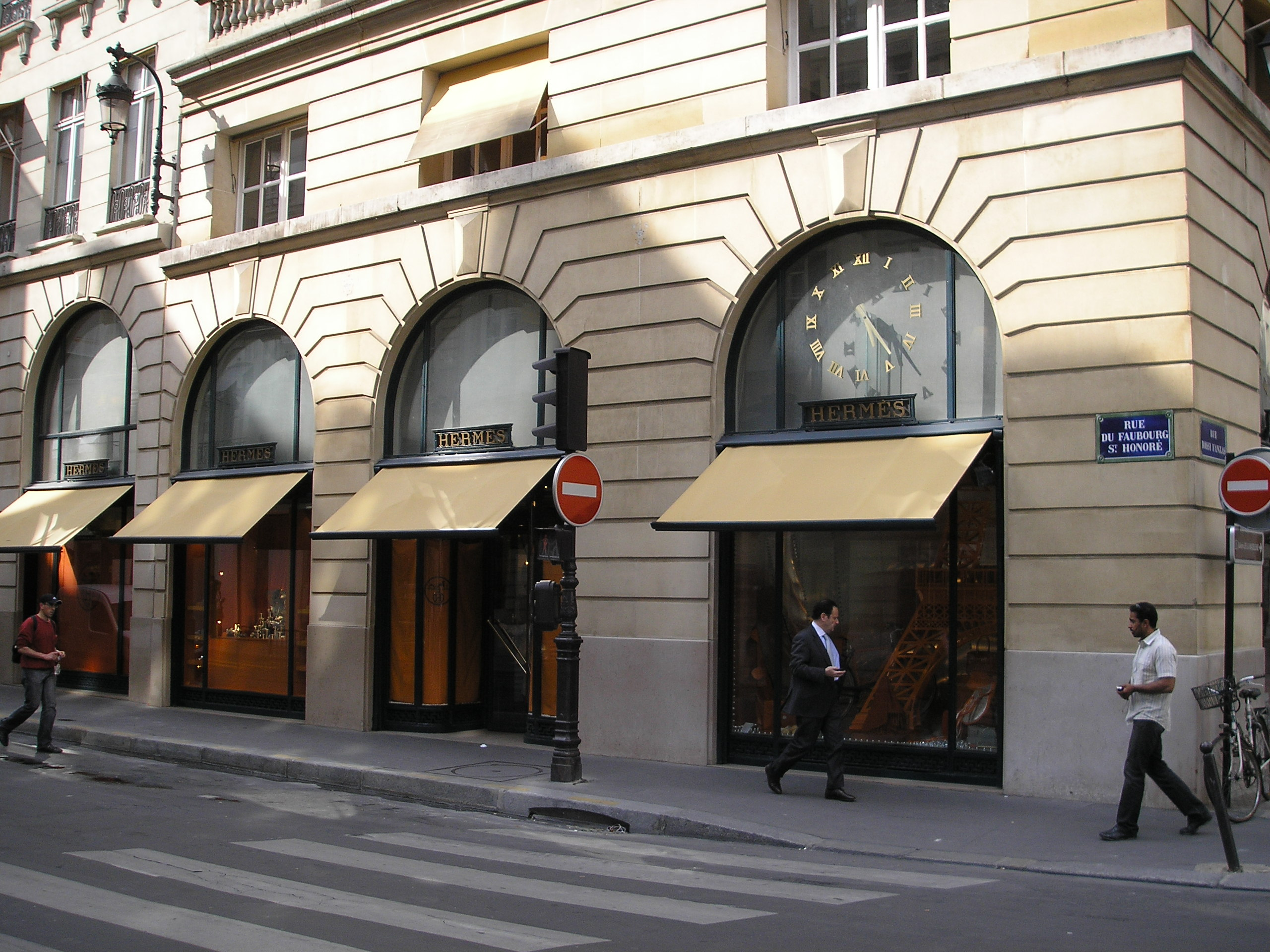
The Rue du Faubourg Saint-Honoré in Paris, location of the Hermès flagship where Nair served as a senior designer.

Following early experience with Yohji Yamamoto and Christian Lacroix, Nair joined Hermès in 2000. He served as a senior designer for womenswear, working under the creative direction of Martin Margiela and Jean-Paul Gaultier.

During this tenure, he was responsible for several of the house's handbag designs, most notably the Birkin Shadow (2009). The design utilized a trompe-l'œil effect, where the silhouettes of the Birkin’s traditional hardware and straps were embossed into the leather to create a "shadow" illusion. He also designed the "Paris-Bombay" bag for the house's permanent collection.

=== Moynat (2010–2020) ===
In 2010, Nair was appointed Artistic Director of Moynat by Bernard Arnault following the brand's acquisition by Groupe Arnault. Tasked with relaunching a house that had been dormant since 1976, Nair reconstructed its identity by researching historical trunk-making techniques. He introduced the "Limousine" curve, a concave base for handbags inspired by vintage automobile trunks, and designed signature models including the Réjane and the Pauline. During this period, he described his design approach as "breathing life back into a sleeping beauty," focusing on how objects feel and age over time rather than following temporary trends.

=== Joseph Duclos (2020–present) ===
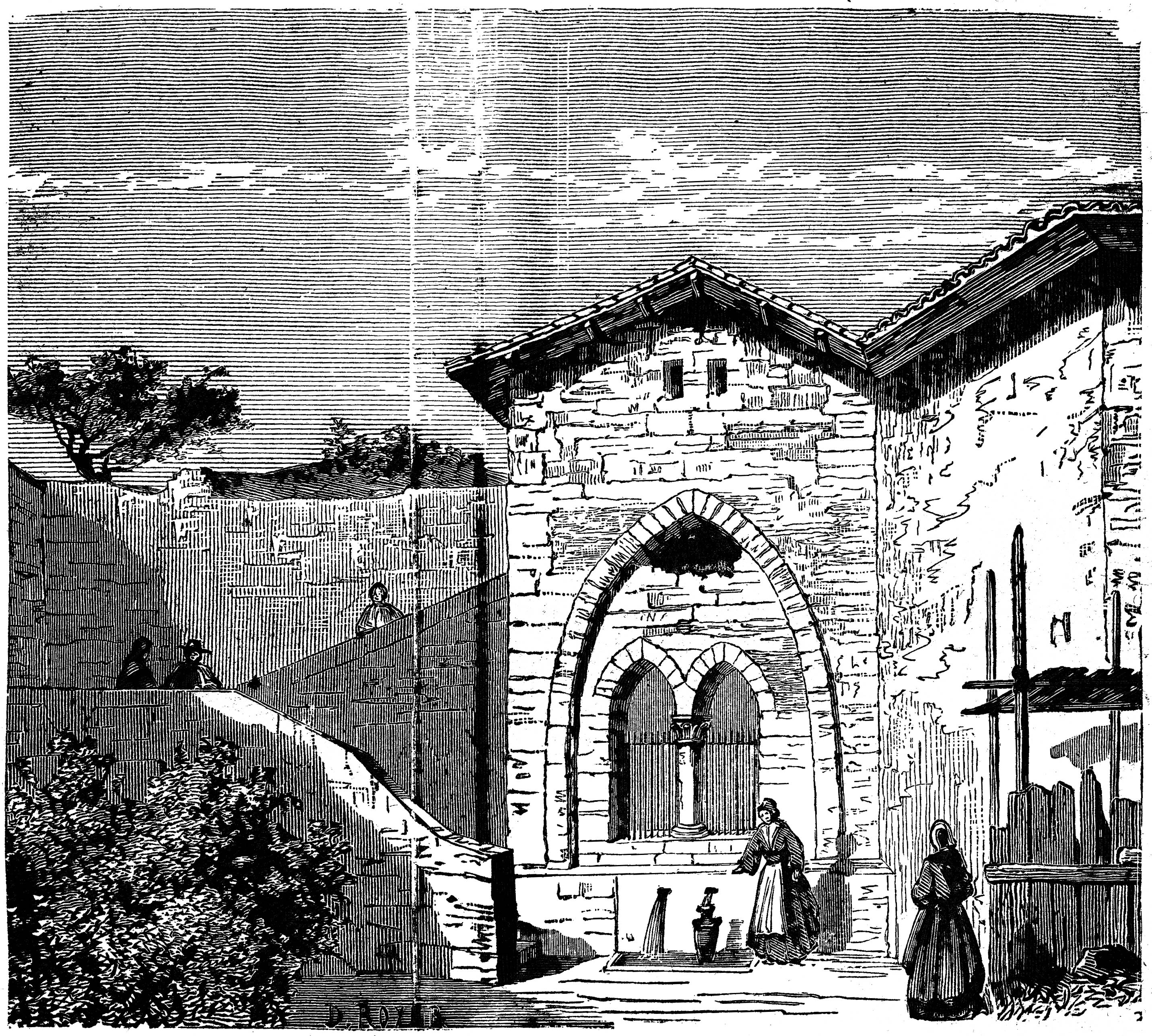
The Diane Fountain in Lectoure, the historic site of the Joseph Duclos Royal Manufacture.

Nair joined Joseph Duclos in 2020 as Artistic Director. The house is based on a Royal Manufacture established in 1754, in the French town of Lectoure. His work there focuses on Haute Maroquinerie, utilizing 18th-century French tanning and artisanal methods. His flagship design for the house, the Diane bag, features a pendulum-style metal closure inspired by historical military costumes and gunpowder sacks.

== Design philosophy and savoir-faire ==
Nair utilizes a concept he calls "invisible design," prioritizing technical complexity and the sensory qualities of materials over visible branding. He has argued that true luxury is found in the "soul" of the material and the precision of the construction rather than a logo.

- Material Standards: Nair selects full-grain, "naked" leathers, which lack synthetic pigments or plastic polymer coatings. This technical choice necessitates the use of high-grade raw materials, as the absence of industrial finishes means natural imperfections in the hide cannot be obscured.
- Russia Leather: Nair directed a multi-year project to recreate "Russia Leather" (Cuir Impérial). This 18th-century tanning process, which uses birch tar and myrrh to create a water-resistant leather, had been lost following the 1917 Russian Revolution.
- Archival Research: He maintains an extensive library of experimental materials and historical archives, which he uses to develop bespoke leathers in collaboration with specialized tanneries. This research led to the "Heritage" leather used at Joseph Duclos, which utilizes traditional oil and wax treatments to allow the material to develop a natural patina.
- Artisanal Preservation: He often works in collaboration with the Compagnons du Devoir, France’s elite artisanal guild, to preserve and revive rare manual skills such as hand-painted edges, specialized saddle-stitching, and angle-stitching.

== Public recognition ==
Ramesh Nair's designs are frequently chosen by public figures, royalty, and figures in the arts and entertainment industries. These include First Ladies of France Brigitte Macron and Carla Bruni-Sarkozy, as well as Queen Camilla, Princess Charlene of Monaco, and entertainers such as Nicole Kidman, Beyoncé, Rihanna, Taylor Swift, Margot Robbie, Reese Witherspoon, Pharrell Williams, Usher, Kylie Jenner, Fan Bingbing, Natalia Vodianova, and CL.
