= Joseph Bédard (Lower Canada politician) =

Canadian politician

Joseph Bédard (February 26, 1774 – September 28, 1832) was a politician in Lower Canada. He represented York from 1800 to 1904 and Surrey from 1810 to 1814 in the Legislative Assembly of Lower Canada.

He was born in Quebec City, the son of Pierre-Stanislas Bédard and Marie-Josephte Thibault, and was educated at the Petit séminaire de Québec. Bédard went on to study law, was called to the bar in 1796 and set up practice in Montreal. In 1803, he married Marie-Geneviève-Scholastique Hubert-Lacroix. He did not run for reelection in 1804 or in 1814. Bédard served as a lieutenant in the militia, later reaching the rank of captain. He took part in the protests against the proposed union of Upper and Lower Canada in 1822. In 1829 and again in 1831, he was named King's Counsel. He died in Montreal at the age of 58.

His brother Pierre-Stanislas Bédard and his nephews Elzéar Bédard and Joseph-Isidore Bédard also served in the assembly. His daughter Marie-Stéphanie married Joseph Bourret.
