= Joseph-Isidore Bédard =

Canadian politician

Joseph-Isidore Bédard (January 9, 1806 – April 14, 1833) was a lawyer and political figure in Lower Canada.

He was born in Quebec City in 1806, the son of Pierre-Stanislas Bédard, and studied at the Séminaire de Nicolet, where he was a brilliant student. He articled in law with Georges-Barthélemi Faribault and was called to the bar in 1829. He was elected to the Legislative Assembly of Lower Canada for Saguenay in 1830. He opposed an elected legislative council and voted against the expulsion of Robert Christie from the assembly.

Bédard wrote the words to the patriotic song Sol Canadien! Terre chérie!, first published in the Quebec Gazette.

Bédard travelled to England with Denis-Benjamin Viger in 1831. In September 1832, when he was about to return to Lower Canada, he suffered a haemorrhage of the lungs. He died in Paris in 1833 and was buried in the cemetery at Montmartre.

His brother Elzéar was a judge and also served in the legislative assembly.
