= Henry Menut =

Canadian politician

Henry Menut (August 15, 1784 – 1838 or later) was a political figure in Lower Canada. He represented Drummond in the Legislative Assembly of Lower Canada from 1836 until the suspension of the constitution in 1838.

He was born in Quebec City, the son of Alexandre Menut, a native of France, and Marie de Land. In 1818, he married Mabel Root. Menut was elected to the assembly in an 1836 by-election held after a second seat was added to Drummond.
