= Quebec Mercury =

Defunct English language Quebec City newspaper

The Quebec Mercury
- Owner(s): Thomas Cary Jr., Pierre-Édouard Desbarats
- Founder: Thomas Cary
- Publisher: Thomas Cary
- Founded: 1805
- Ceased publication: 1863
- Political alignment: Conservative
- Language: English
- Headquarters: Quebec City, Lower Canada

The Quebec Mercury was an English language weekly newspaper published in Quebec City from 1805 to 1863.

The Mercury was founded by publisher Thomas Cary in respect and veneration of Canada's link to the United Kingdom. From 1828 to 1848 the Mercury was owned jointly by Thomas Cary Jr. and Pierre-Édouard Desbarats. The newspaper generally represented the economic and political interests of the English merchants, while its rival Le Canadien (1806–1893) represented the economic and political interests of the French language moneyed groups. The Quebec Mercury was deeply conservative, advocated for the assimilation of French Canadians, and sought to Anglicise the colony. Cary perceived the rise of a French middle class and the French majority in the Assembly as a threat to the growth of Anglo-Canadian commercial interests. The newspaper survived until the 1950s.

Together, Le Canadien and the Mercury were the first truly political newspapers printed in Canada.

== See also ==
- List of newspapers in Canada
