= Nicolas Lefrançois =

Canadian politician

Nicolas Lefrançois (French pronunciation: [nikɔla ləfʁɑ̃swa]; November 2, 1794 – February 22, 1866) was a land surveyor and political figure in Lower Canada. He represented Montmorency in the Legislative Assembly of Lower Canada from 1836 until the suspension of the constitution in 1837.

He was born in L'Ange-Gardien, the son of Pierre Lefrançois and Marguerite Gravelle, received his commission as a surveyor in 1823 and practised until 1865. He conducted surveys on the north bank of the Saint Lawrence River between Portneuf and La Malbaie and on the south bank between the seigneury of Lauzon and Saint-Jean-Port-Joli. Lefrançois was elected to the assembly in an 1836 by-election held after Elzéar Bédard was named a judge. He appears to have never married. Lefrançois died in L'Ange-Gardien at the age of 71.
