= Charles de Saint-Ours =

Charles de Saint-Ours (August 24, 1753 – November 11, 1834) was a seigneur and political figure in Lower Canada.

He was born Roch-Louis de Saint-Ours in the town of Quebec in 1753. He became a major in the militia in 1774 and took part in the defence of Fort St John's (later Saint-Jean-sur-Richelieu) against the Americans. He was taken prisoner, returned to Quebec in 1777 and became a lieutenant in the Canadian volunteers. He was named aide-de-camp to Governor Sir Guy Carleton and also served as aide-de-camp for Prince William Henry, who later became William IV, during his visit to the province in 1787. In 1792, he inherited parts of the seigneuries of Saint-Ours, L'Assomption, and Deschaillons; he eventually acquired all of the seigneury of Saint-Ours. Around 1792, he married Josette Murray, whose great-uncle was former governor James Murray. He became a captain in the regular army in 1795, later retiring on half pay. Saint-Ours was named to the Legislative Council of Lower Canada in 1808 and remained a member until his death. He served as colonel in the militia during the War of 1812.

He died at Saint-Ours in 1834.

His brother Paul-Roch also served as a member of the legislative council. His daughter Josette married Pierre-Dominique Debartzch, who later served on the legislative council. His son François-Roch became a member of the legislative assembly. His niece Josephte-Catherine married Jacques Dorion, a doctor and later a member of the assembly.
