= Paschal Sirois-Duplessis =

Canadian politician

Paschal Sirois-Duplessis (August 9, 1762 – November 14, 1797) was a political figure in Lower Canada.

He was a farmer and merchant in Saint-André, Lower Canada. He was elected to the Legislative Assembly of Lower Canada in 1796 for Cornwallis county, for the Parti canadien.

He died in office at the age of 35, in a shipwreck near Grosse-Île island in the Saint Lawrence River, off the coast of Kamouraska, Quebec; his body was found the following June.

He married Marie-Josephte Pelletier in 1786.
