= Jean-Baptiste Proulx =

Canadian politician

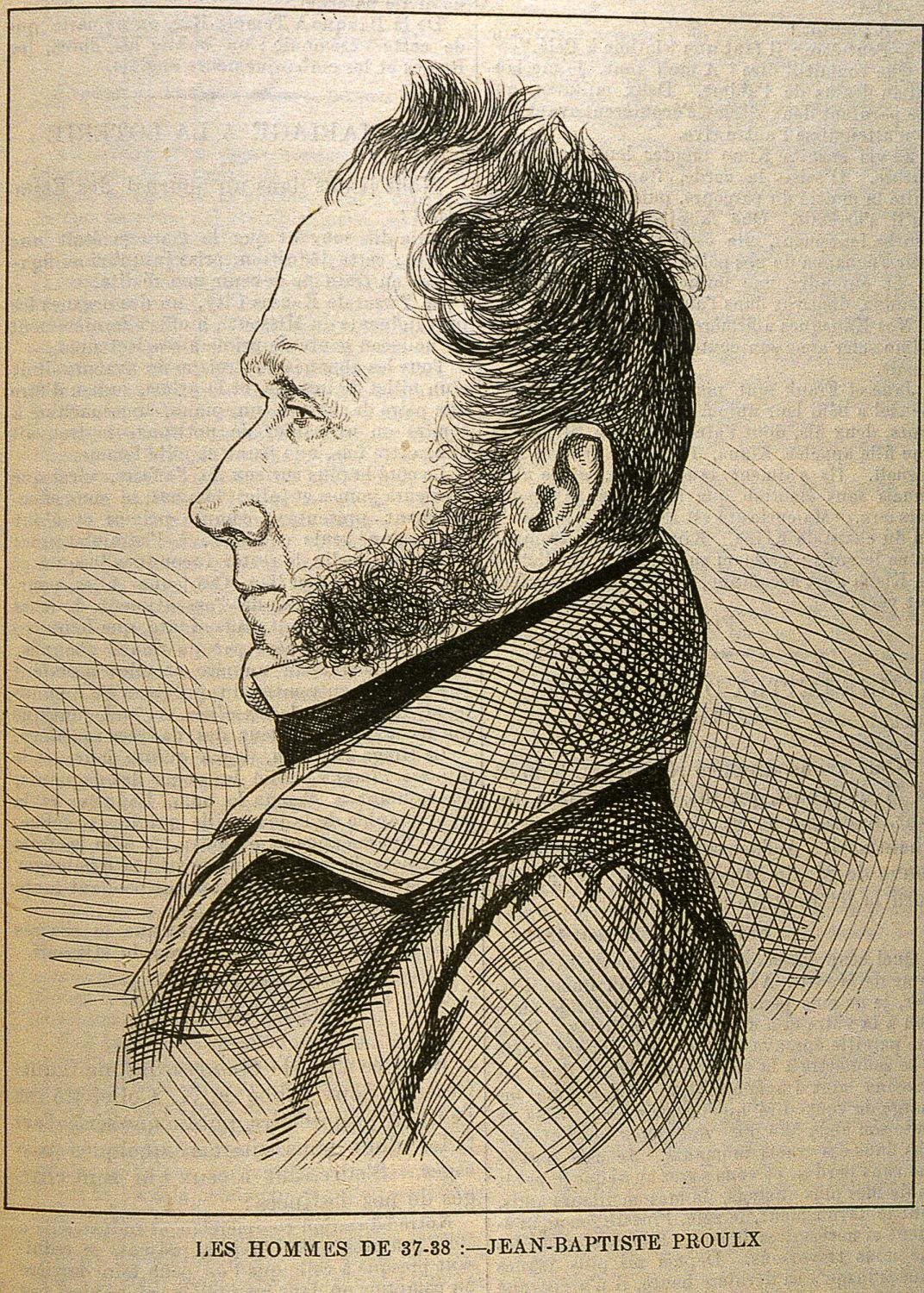
Portrait of Jean-Baptiste Proulx published in 1877 in L'Opinion publique

Jean-Baptiste Proulx (July 13, 1793 – July 17, 1856) was a farmer and political figure in Lower Canada from Nicolet. A veteran of the War of 1812, he served in the Legislative Assembly of Lower Canada from 1820 to 1830, and then as representative from Nicolet. He supported the Ninety-Two Resolutions and tried to organize revolt, suffering arrest in 1838. He was later released and returned to raising cattle, purchasing considerable land in Nicolet.

== Biography ==
He was born in Nicolet in 1793, the son of a farmer, and studied at the Séminaire de Nicolet. He returned to the family farm after completing his studies. Proulx served in the local militia during the War of 1812 and later became lieutenant in the militia.

Proulx entered political life, being elected to the Legislative Assembly of Lower Canada for Buckingham in 1820 and serving until 1830, when the riding was divided. (His uncle Louis Proulx had earlier represented Buckingham in the assembly.) Jean-Baptiste Proulx was elected from Nicolet as a supporter of the Parti patriote. Proulx represented Nicolet until the suspension of the constitution following the Lower Canada Rebellion.

In 1827, Proulx had been dismissed from his post in the militia because he had expressed disagreement with the policies of Governor George Ramsay and criticized the commander of the local militia, Lieutenant-Colonel Kenelm Conor Chandler. In the 1830s Proulx supported the Ninety-Two Resolutions and attempted to organize armed revolt in his county, but with little success. He was arrested in 1838 but later released.

He returned to raising cattle. Proulx had married Flore Lemire in 1830 and they had several children together. He purchased a large part of the seigneury of Nicolet.

Proux died at Nicolet in 1856.
