= Jean-Joseph Trestler =

Canadian politician

Jean-Joseph Trestler (c. 1757 – December 7, 1813) was a German-born businessman, land owner and political figure in Lower Canada. He represented York in the Legislative Assembly of Lower Canada from 1808 to 1809. His name also appears as Jean-Joseph Tröstler.

He was born in Mannheim, the son of Henry Tröstler and Magdeleine Feitten. Trestler came to Quebec in 1776 as a member of a German mercenary unit. He was discharged from the army in 1783 or earlier and became a peddler in Montreal. Trestler was married twice: to Marguerite Noël in 1785 and then to Marie-Anne-Joseph Curtius in 1794. In 1786, he purchased a home in the seigneury of Vaudreuil, where he operated a general store as well as a potash factory. He was also involved in the fur trade and transporting goods on the Ottawa River. He was able to acquire a substantial amount of property with the proceeds from his business operations. Trestler did not run for reelection to the assembly in 1809. He died in Vaudreuil.

His granddaughter Iphigénie Trestler married Antoine-Aimé Dorion and his granddaughter Marie Abby Victoria Hays married Jean-Baptiste-Éric Dorion.

Trestler's home in Dorion, designated a National Historic Site of Canada by the Canadian government and a historic monument by the Quebec government, is now a museum.
