= Louis Gouin =

1800s politician in Lower Canada

- Born: Louis-Joseph Gouin; September 27, 1756; Sainte-Anne-de-la-Pérade, Quebec
- Died: September 1, 1814 (aged 57); Baie-du-Febvre, Quebec
- Occupation: politician
- Spouses: Marie-Élisabeth Gouin (m. 1776) Catherine Rousseau (m. 1780)
- Parents: Louis Gouin (father); Marie-Thérèse Lanouette (mother)

Louis Gouin (September 27, 1756 – September 1, 1814) was a seigneur and political figure in Lower Canada. He represented Buckinghamshire in the Legislative Assembly of Lower Canada from 1800 to 1804.

== Biography ==
Gouin was born Louis-Joseph Gouin in Sainte-Anne-de-la-Pérade, Quebec, the son of Louis Gouin and Marie-Thérèse Lanouette. Gouin was a captain in the militia, later reaching the rank of major. In 1789, he established himself as a merchant at Baie-du-Febvre, Quebec. He also owned a mill there. Gouin did not run for reelection in 1804. He purchased the seigneury of Courval in 1804 and part of the seigneury of Saint-François in 1806. In 1809, Gouin was named a school commissioner. He was married twice: to his cousin Marie-Élisabeth Gouin in 1776 and then to Catherine Rousseau in 1780. He died in Baie-du-Febvre at the age of 57.
