= John Jones (died 1818) =

Canadian politician

John Jones (c. 1752 – August 3, 1818) was a businessman and political figure in Lower Canada. He represented the Lower Town of Quebec in the Legislative Assembly of Lower Canada from 1808 to 1810.

Jones came to Quebec City in 1777 and set up business as a seller of imported spirits. His business failed a few years later. In 1789, he set up in business again as an auctioneer and broker, mainly dealing in the sale of goods following bankruptcies, deaths or departures from the province. In 1794, he married Margaret Harrison, possibly the daughter of Edward Harrison; Jones' first wife had died some time earlier. Jones also became involved in wholesale and retail sale of goods, also investing in property.

From 1794 to 1795, he was partner with William Vondenvelden in a print shop and the weekly newspaper Le Cours du tems/The Times, later selling his share to Vondenvelden. He served in the local militia, becoming captain and also served as president of the Quebec Fire Society. Jones helped found the Committee of Trade of Quebec in 1808. In that year, he was elected to the legislative assembly, where he split his support between the parti canadien and the English party. In 1810, he stood aside to allow John Mure to be elected to the assembly.

He died at Quebec in 1818.

His daughter Elizabeth Vaughan married merchant James Ross and later inherited her father's estate.
