= François Languedoc =

Canadian politician

François Languedoc (October 11, 1790 – September 23, 1840) was a seigneur, businessman and political figure in Lower Canada.

He was born François de Borgias Languedoc in the town of Quebec in 1790, the son of a merchant. From 1812 to 1821, he was associated with John White and Company, which supplied goods for ships and sold and transported supplies for the army. They also operated, with other partners, a ferry service between Quebec and Pointe-Lévy and a steamboat service between Quebec and Montreal. In 1813, he married Anna Maria, the daughter of captain John Philipps. In 1816, Languedoc was elected to the Legislative Assembly of Lower Canada for the Lower Town of Quebec. In 1817, he purchased the seigneury of Saint-Georges. He was elected to represent L'Acadie in the assembly 1830. He did not support the Ninety-Two Resolutions. Languedoc was named justice of the peace in 1830. He also served in the militia reaching the rank of lieutenant-colonel.

He died at his manor in Saint-Édouard near Napierville in 1840.

His sister Louise married Louis Roy Portelance, who also served in the assembly.
