= Jean-Bernard Pelletier =

Canadian politician

Jean-Bernard Pelletier (August 30, 1739 – April 21, 1816) was a farmer and political figure in Lower Canada. He represented Devon in the Legislative Assembly of Lower Canada from 1800 to 1804. His surname also appears as Peltier and he was sometimes referred to as Bernard Pelletier.

He was born in Saint-Roch-des-Aulnaies, the son of Jean-Bernard Peltier and Marthe Brisson. In 1762, he married Marie-Joseph Caron. Pelletier was elected bailiff for Saint-Roch-des-Aulnaies in 1770. He did not run for reelection to the assembly in 1804. He died in Saint-Roch-des-Aulnaies at the age of 75.
