= Charles Hus, dit Millet =

Canadian politician

Charles Hus dit Millet (March 4, 1738 – March 29, 1802) was a political figure in Lower Canada. He represented Richelieu in the Legislative Assembly of Lower Canada from 1796 to 1800. His name also appears as Charles Millette.

He was born in Sorel, the son of Claude Millet (Hus dit Millet) and Françoise Mandeville. Millet served as a captain in the militia and as bailiff at Sorel. In 1763, he married Catherine Antaya dit Pelletier. He did not run for reelection to the assembly in 1800. Millet died in Sorel at the age of 62.
