= John Steel (Canadian politician) =

Canadian politician

John Steel (ca 1737 – May 13, 1826), alternatively spelled John Steele, was a Scottish-born ship's captain and political figure in Lower Canada. He represented Bedford in the Legislative Assembly of Lower Canada from 1800 to 1804.

== Career ==
Steel served as a volunteer in the British Navy during the American Revolution, reaching the rank of captain. In 1784, he arrived in Halifax, Nova Scotia as a midshipman. In 1785, he went to Quebec City, where he served as ship commander in the Lower Canada navy. Steel was named a justice of the peace for Montreal district in 1798 and also served as harbour master. He did not run for reelection to the assembly in 1804.

== Personal life ==
Steel was born in Ayrshire on 1737. Around 1787, he married Nancy Griggs. He died, likely at Caldwell's Manor, in 1826 at the age of 89.
