= François Viger =

Canadian politician, merchant, and farmer

François Viger (November 30, 1752 – August 20, 1824) was a farmer, merchant and political figure in Lower Canada. He represented Kent in the Legislative Assembly of Lower Canada from 1800 to 1808.

He was born in Boucherville, the son of François Viger and Josephte Chénier. In 1789, he married Clémence Babin. Viger did not run for reelection in 1808. He died in Boucherville at the age of 71.
