= Étienne Nivard Saint-Dizier =

Canadian politician

Étienne Nivard Saint-Dizier (French: [etjɛn nivaʁ sɛ̃ dizje]; ca 1766 – May 16, 1820) was a merchant and political figure in Lower Canada. He represented Montreal West in the Legislative Assembly of Lower Canada from 1810 to 1814.

He was born in Montreal, the son of Étienne Nivard Saint-Dizier and Anne-Amable Vallé. In 1789, he married Marie-Anne Magnan. After 1796, he was involved in Montreal's municipal administration. Nivard Saint-Dizier was named a justice of the peace in 1806. He also served in the militia, reaching the rank of lieutenant-colonel in command of Pointe-Claire division and serving in that capacity during the War of 1812. He did not run for reelection to the assembly in 1814. Nivard Saint-Dizier died in Montreal.

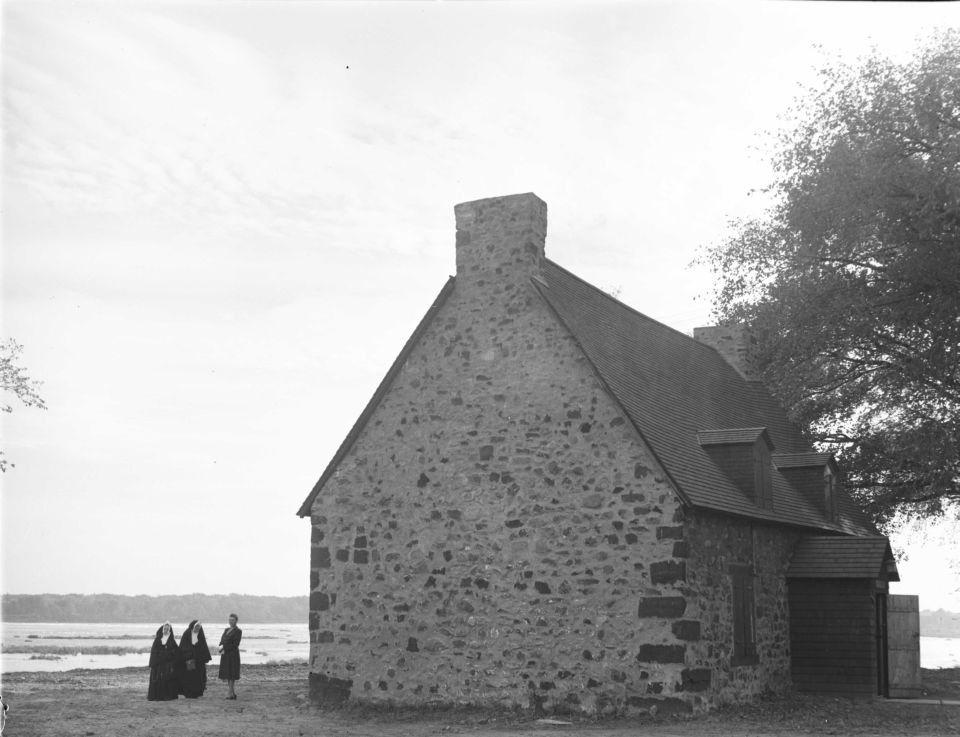
Saint-Dizier house

His former home, which had earlier been owned by the nuns of the Congrégation de Notre-Dame and then later by Étienne Nivard Saint-Dizier, father and son, is now designated as a historic building by the city of Montreal.
