= Thomas Lee (notary) =

Canadian politician (1783–1832)

Thomas Lee (1783 – August 20, 1832) was a notary, merchant and political figure in Lower Canada.

He was born Thomas Lée in the town of Quebec in 1783, the son of merchant Jean-Thomas Lée, and studied at the Petit Séminaire de Québec. He articled as a notary, qualified to practice in 1805 and set up practice at Quebec. He owned a sawmill and linseed oil factory at Saint-Roch. He was co-owner of the print shop that produced the newspaper Le Canadien. He served as a captain in the local militia but was removed from this post in 1827 by Governor Dalhousie at the request of his superior lieutenant-colonel Perrault. In 1808, he married Marie, the daughter of doctor John Conrad Just. Lee was elected to the Legislative Assembly of Lower Canada for Northumberland in 1809 and was reelected in 1810 and 1814. He supported the parti canadien. He was elected for the Lower Town of Quebec in April 1820, then for the Upper Town of Quebec in an 1828 by-election held after the death of Jean Bélanger. He was reelected in 1830 and died in office at Quebec in 1832. In 1822, he had married Mary, the daughter of printer John Neilson. In 1830, Lee was named commissioner in charge of maintaining roads in the Quebec region.

His sister Catherine married notary and lawyer Alexandre Dumas.
