= Joseph Éthier =

Canadian politician

Joseph Éthier (1733 or 1738 – February 1, 1816) was a political figure in Lower Canada. He represented York in the Legislative Assembly of Lower Canada from 1796 to 1800. His surname also appears as Etié, Ethié and Héthier.

He was born Joseph-Amable Éthier in Pointe-Claire, the son of Joseph Éthier and Catherine Lauzon. In 1762, he married Marie-Josephte Turpin. Éthier did not run for reelection to the assembly in 1800. He was a captain in the militia at the beginning of the War of 1812. Éthier died at Saint-Eustache at the age of 82.
