= Louis-Édouard Hubert =

Canadian politician

Member of the Legislative Assembly of Lower Canada for Richelieu
- In office 1800–1804

Personal details
- Born: February 17, 1766 Montreal, Quebec (then Province of Quebec)
- Died: November 9, 1842 (aged 76) Saint-Denis, Quebec, Canada East
- Spouse: Cécile Cartier (m. 1796)
- Occupation: Merchant, politician, militia officer

Military service
- Allegiance: Lower Canada militia
- Rank: Lieutenant; Quartermaster (War of 1812)

Louis-Édouard Hubert (February 17, 1766 – November 9, 1842) was a merchant and politician in Lower Canada. He represented Richelieu in the Legislative Assembly of Lower Canada from 1800 to 1804.

He was born in Montreal, the son of Pierre Hubert and Marie-Josephte Chartier. Hubert was educated at the Petit Séminaire de Québec and settled at Saint-Denis. In 1796, he married Cécile Cartier, the daughter of the merchant Jacques Cartier. Hubert invested in real estate and was involved in the grain trade. He served in the militia during the War of 1812, serving as lieutenant and quartermaster. Hubert did not support the Patriotes during the Lower Canada Rebellion but his home was plundered by the British. Two of his sons were taken into custody for taking part in the rebellion. He died at Saint-Denis at the age of 76.
