= William Vondenvelden =

Canadian politician

William Vondenvelden (ca. 1753 – June 20, 1809) was a Holy Roman Empire-born surveyor, printer and political figure in Lower Canada.

He was born in Hesse-Kassel (or Hesse-Cassel), Germany in 1753 and came to Quebec as a lieutenant with the Hesse-Hanau Chasseurs, which fought for Britain during the American Revolution. He retired from the army and settled at Quebec City, becoming translator for the Quebec Gazette in 1782. He qualified as a surveyor in 1783. In 1786, he was named justice of the peace for Gaspé district and moved to New Carlisle. He was appointed clerk of the Court of Common Pleas and clerk of the peace in 1787. He also practiced as a surveyor, including a survey for Bonaventure Island. Vondenvelden returned to Quebec City in 1783 and, with merchant John Jones, set up a print shop there. In 1794, Jones and Vondenvelden launched the weekly Le Cours du tems/The Times. In 1795, he was named official printer for the statutes produced by the provincial parliament by Governor Guy Carleton. He was appointed assistant surveyor general for the province in the same year. In 1798, he sold his printing operation to Pierre-Édouard Desbarats and Roger Lelièvre.

In 1803, with Louis Charland, he produced A new topographical map of the province of Lower Canada and a book, Extraits des titres des anciennes concessions de terre en fief et seineurie, describing the seigneuries in the province. In 1799, he was named surveyor of the highways, streets, and lanes for the town and parish of Quebec. Vondenvelden was elected to the Legislative Assembly of Lower Canada for Gaspé in 1800. He returned to his practice as a surveyor in 1804.

He died at Quebec City in 1809 after having been involved in a carriage accident.
