= Joseph Turgeon =

Canadian politician

Joseph Turgeon (April 5, 1751 – May 1, 1831) was a master carpenter and political figure in Lower Canada. He represented Leinster in the Legislative Assembly of Lower Canada from 1808 to 1809.

== Early life ==
He was born Joseph-Marie Turgeon in Beaumont, the son of Jacques Turgeon and Marie Fournier. Turgeon established himself at L'Assomption, moving to Lavaltrie around 1790.

== Professional career ==
Turgeon was defeated when he ran for reelection to the assembly in 1809.

== Personal life ==
In 1778, he married Louise Marion.

== Death ==
He died in Lavaltrie at the age of 80.
