= Augustin Caron =

Canadian politician

Augustin Caron (September 15, 1778 – September 4, 1862) was a farmer and political figure in Lower Canada. He represented Northumberland in the Legislative Assembly of Lower Canada from 1808 to 1809 and from 1811 to 1814.

He was born in Sainte-Anne-de-Beaupré, the son of Ignace Caron and Marie-Élisabeth Émond. Caron served in the militia, was a commissioner for the summary trial of minor causes and a justice of the peace for Quebec district. In 1797, he married Marie-Élisabeth Lessard, a relative. He did not run for reelection to the assembly in 1809; he was elected again in an 1811 by-election held following the death of Joseph Drapeau but did not run for reelection in 1814. Caron died in Sainte-Anne-de-Beaupré at the age of 83.

His son René-Édouard Caron also served in the assembly and later became Lieutenant Governor of Quebec. His grandson Adolphe-Philippe Caron served in the Canadian House of Commons.
