= Nicolas Dorion =

Canadian politician and merchant

Nicolas Dorion (August 6, 1764 – July 7, 1826) was a merchant and political figure in Lower Canada. He represented Devon in the Legislative Assembly of Lower Canada from 1796 to 1800.

He was born in Quebec City, the son of François Dorion and Nathalie Trudelle. He established himself in business there in partnership with Paul Dorion. Dorion did not run for reelection in 1800. He died in Haverhill, New Hampshire at the age of 61.
