= Alexis Caron (Lower Canada politician) =

Canadian politician

Alexis Caron (November 2, 1764 – February 25, 1827) was a lawyer, judge and political figure in Lower Canada. He represented Surrey in the Legislative Assembly of Lower Canada from 1802 to 1804.

He was born in Quebec City, the son of Alexis Caron and Catherine Tessier, and was educated at the Collège Saint-Raphaël. Caron was called to the Lower Canada bar in 1791. He was elected to the assembly in an 1802 by-election held following the death of Philippe-François de Rastel de Rocheblave. Caron did not run for reelection in 1804. He married Charlotte-Gillette Pommereaux in 1807. He was named King's Counsel in 1812. Caron served as a major in the militia during the War of 1812. In 1821, he was named judge in the provincial court at Gaspé. He died in Paspébiac at the age of 62.
