= Eustache Trottier =

Lower Canadian merchant, seigneur, militia officer, and businessman

Eustache-Ignace Trottier Desrivières-Beaubien (February 10, 1761 – October 3, 1816) was a wealthy Lower Canadian merchant, seigneur, militia officer, and businessman.

== Biography ==
Eustache was born into a wealthy fur-trading family on February 10, 1761, in Montreal, New France (present-day Quebec); his parents were Eustache Trottier Desrivières-Beaubien (1727–1799) and Marguerite Maillot (1735–1806).

Eustache accompanied his father during his childhood, involving himself the family business at a very young age. In the years following the British conquest, the family began turning towards retail upon the arrival of competitive British merchants. With the help of his father, Eustache eventually opened his own general store in Varennes upon his marriage on October 7, 1783, to Marie-Appolline Bailly de Messein, with whom he fathered many children. Eustache later married Charlotte Boucher de La Bruère on August 7, 1796.

In the years following, Eustache continued to grow his wealth and acquired numerous estates. He also served as the head of the militia battalion at Châteauguay (1813) and was a lieutenant-colonel in the Verchères militia until his death on October 3, 1816.

== See also ==
- French Canadians
- History of Canada
