= Jean-Baptiste Hébert =

Canadian politician

Jean-Baptiste Hébert (September 19, 1779 – June 15, 1863) was a merchant, farmer, master carpenter and political figure in Lower Canada. He represented Buckingham from 1808 to 1814 and Nicolet from 1835 until the suspension of the constitution in 1838 in the Legislative Assembly of Lower Canada.

He was born in Godefroy, the son of Étienne Hébert and Marie-Josephte Babin, both of Acadian descent. Hébert served as a captain in the militia during the War of 1812, later reaching the rank of major. He participated in the construction of several churches, including those at Lotbinière and Kamouraska and a number of other buildings, including the Séminaire de Nicolet. He was married twice: first to Marie Béliveau in 1801 and then to Judith Lemire in 1807. Hébert did not run for reelection to the assembly in 1814. He was elected to the assembly for Nicolet in an 1835 by-election held after the death of Louis Bourdages. He was put in prison in February 1838 for taking part in the Lower Canada Rebellion but was released later that same month. Hébert died at Kamouraska at the age of 81.

His second wife's sister Flore married Jean-Baptiste Proulx.

He's the great-grandfather of author and poet Anne Hébert.
