= Charles Benoit Livernois =

Canadian politician (1755–1840)

Charles Benoit Livernois (March 12, 1755 – January 5, 1840) was a political figure in Lower Canada. He represented Richelieu in the Legislative Assembly of Lower Canada from 1800 to 1804. His surname also appears as Benoit, Benoit-Livernois and Benoit dit Livernois.

He was born in Saint-Charles-sur-Richelieu, the son of Jean-Baptiste Benoit dit Livernois and Marie-Anne Gipoulon. In 1787, he married Marie-Joseph Mingot dit Dumaine. Benoit Livernois did not run for reelection in 1804. He died in Saint-Hyacinthe at the age of 84.

One of his sons married a daughter of Louis Bourdages.
