= Louis Paquet =

Member of the Legislative Assembly of Lower Canada
- In office 1796–1804
- Constituency: Quebec County

Personal details
- Born: September 6, 1737; Charlesbourg
- Died: 1804 or later

Louis Paquet (September 6, 1737 – 1804 or later) was a political figure in Lower Canada. He represented Quebec County in the Legislative Assembly of Lower Canada from 1796 to 1804.

He was born in Charlesbourg, the son of Jean-Baptiste Pacquiet and Élisabeth-Angélique Frichet. In 1763, he married Marie-Thérèse Bédard, whose father was the cousin of Joseph and Pierre-Stanislas Bédard. Paquet did not run for reelection to the assembly in 1804.
