= Charles Blouin =

Canadian politician

Charles Blouin (November 3, 1753 – August 21, 1844) was a farmer and political figure in Lower Canada. He represented Orléans in the Legislative Assembly of Lower Canada from 1810 to 1820.

He was born in Saint-Jean on the île d'Orléans, the son of Joseph Blouin and Marie-Joseph Blais. Blouin, like his father, served as a captain in the militia. He was married twice: first to Marie-Joseph Tremblay, a relative, in 1778 and then to Marie-Ursule Blouin, also a relative, in 1816. Blouin did not run for reelection to the assembly in 1820. He died at Saint-Jean at the age of 90.
