= Pierre Saint-Julien =

Canadian politician

Pierre Saint-Julien (October 26, 1765 – 1827 or later) was a farmer and political figure in Lower Canada. He represented York in the Legislative Assembly of Lower Canada from 1809 to 1814. His name also appears as Pierre Julien.

He was born in Pointe-Claire, the son of Joseph Saint-Julien and Marie-Joseph Aumay. Saint-Julien farmed at Vaudreuil where his parents moved around 1778, then at Rigaud and later at L'Orignal in Upper Canada. In 1786, he married Marie-Rose Céré. He did not run for reelection to the assembly in 1814. Saint-Julien died some time after 1827, possibly in L'Orignal.
