= Joseph Duclos =

French merchant

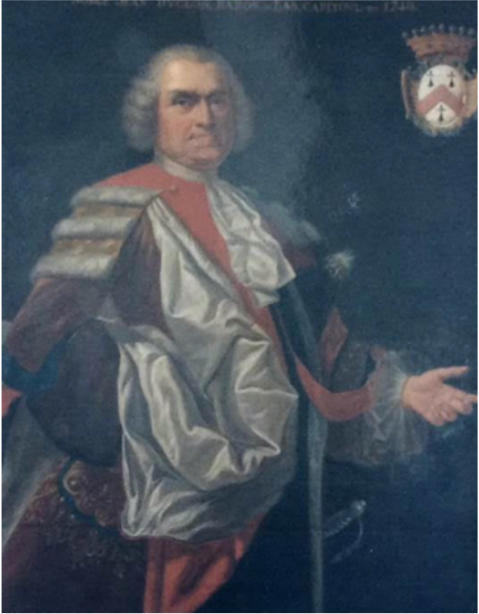
- Jean Duclos, Father of Joseph Duclos
- Born: Joseph Duclos de Bouillas; 1719; Toulouse
- Died: 1764 (aged 44–45)
- Occupations: Marketer and trader

Joseph Duclos de Bouillas, born in 1719 in Toulouse, Languedoc and died in 1764, was a French merchant and trader of the Age of Enlightenment. He is also the founder of the Royal Manufactory of Lectoure.

== The Duclos ==
=== The Duclos family ===
The Duclos family was a well-respected and prosperous Toulouse family of merchants.

Jean Duclos, Joseph's father, was magistrate and baron of Laas.

In 1746, the family acquired a house located at 13 rue Peyras in Toulouse, between rue Saint-Rome and rue Alsace-Lorraine in the city center. Previously owned by Joseph Colomès de Laréole, this large mansion dates to the end of the 16th century.

It is one of the largest buildings on rue Peyras, with a symmetrical front spanned by nine windows whose sobriety reflects the precision of the merchants’ work. The central bay is marked by a monumental arched portal giving access to the inner courtyard. The Duclos family owned eight stores in the rue du Faubourg Saint Etienne in Toulouse, where they stored leather and grain that they sold, via the Canal du Midi, to Marseille.

=== Joseph Duclos (biography) ===
Joseph Duclos was lord of Bouillas, a former land located between Lectoure and Fleurance.

Prosperous merchant and trader from Toulouse, Joseph and his brother, Jean Barthélemy Duclos, ensured transfers of funds from direct taxes between Paris and Auch, serving as intermediaries between the Receiver General of Finance Taillepied, Count de Bondy, in Paris, and the first clerk Marian at the head of the general revenue services in Auch.

In order to carry out free distributions during the famine of 1751-1752, he supplied large quantities of rice to the intendant of Etigny in Auch.

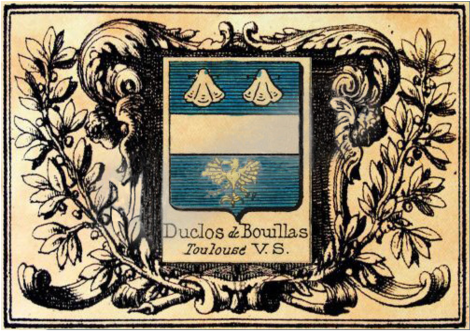
Coat of arms of Joseph Duclos de Bouillas

In 1751, the two brothers inherited three tanners' workshops and a house belonging to the Pérès family, a rich family of tanners from the town of Lectoure, linked by marriage to the Duclos. The Duclos brothers seized the opportunity to develop the leather trade in Lectoure on the model of a manufactory.

== The Royal Manufactory of Lectoure ==
=== The Age of Enlightenment – Creation of French Luxury ===
At the beginning of the 18th century, French industry continued its development, begun in the previous century by Colbert, then minister of Louis XIV. His aim was to give France a strong economic and financial independence, by launching several new industries. He then decided to improve and develop existing workshops thanks to the contribution of a more qualified foreign workforce. These industries, subsidized by the State, could then be granted the title of royal manufacture. Colbert's wish was to create luxury products capable of enriching the country.

As a result, the existing small artisanal workshops were gradually grouped together to form larger establishments that were given the name "manufacture".

The export of French products to Spain was also important and offered many opportunities.

=== 1754 ===
The Duclos brothers, Joseph and Jean Barthelemy bought the land surrounding their workshops in Lectoure in order to build an establishment capable of producing a large quantity of leather for the trade with major cities in France, Spain and other European countries. Joseph Duclos handled most of the land purchases between 1751 and 1753, also recruiting local labor for the future factory.

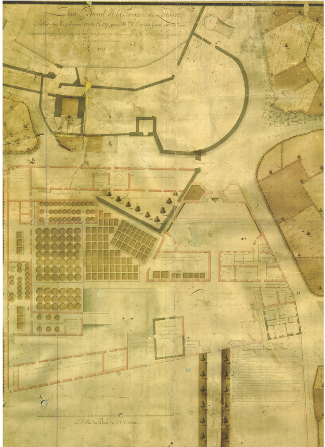
Map of the Royal Manufactory of Lectoure

The people of Lectoure, convinced of the economic advantages of such an establishment in their town, granted them the right to use the water from the neighboring fountains: Diane and Saint Clair, to supply the factory. In fact, both fountains are supplied with water from the springs of the same name. The Diane fountain supplied water to the works of the Fontelie district and Hountélie in Gascony, notably the tanners' workshops located below, as well as to the royal tannery of Lectoure and a large number of domestic households before the installation of running water.

The good reputation of the Duclos also allowed them to obtain from the king the possibility of appropriating a portion of the bastion of the fortified enclosure to construct their buildings.

On March 19, 1752, the Duclos brothers set up a company by notarial deed in order to obtain the capital necessary for the construction and the operation of their establishment, for a period of 25 years. For financial support, they joined forces with two Parisian bankers, Henri and Pierre Duman and Louis Ricateau, while retaining a majority share in the company. The capital of the company was four hundred thousand pounds, three quarters of which came from the Duclos family.

On January 30, 1752, the first stone of the tannery was laid and blessed by the bishop of the town, Lord Narbonne Pelet. A grand ceremony was organized and the whole town of Lectoure was invited. Everything was favourable for a prosperous business. It was protected by the royal administration, blessed by the Church and equipped with the modern techniques of the time, along with about a hundred workers chosen from the best tanneries in the Kingdom and in Europe. Although the local labor force had been requisitioned, the most qualified workers came from outside the region, including far horizons.

The activity of the manufacture began in 1754 with the support of the intendant. On April 22, 1754, Joseph Duclos applied to the king, to obtain the title of "Royal Manufactory" by royal decree.

=== Royal Decree ===
In 1754, King Louis XV allowed Joseph Duclos to create the Manufactory Royale of Lectoure leather.

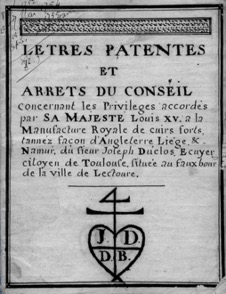
Royal Decree signed by Joseph Duclos

It is notable that the concept of ecology was already important at the time, one also finds it written in the royal decree : "Barthelemy & Joseph Duclos, brothers, merchants in Toulouse [...] this site being very clean by the nature of its ground & its waters for the preparation of the leathers [...] by destroying the use of quicklime in the first preparation of the leathers, to get the swelling without the recourse of any corrosive ingredients".

The production was more sustainable for the environment and less aggressive to the skins but also more expensive. The Manufactory Royale de Lectoure was then able to sell its production throughout Europe, and was very attractive. The architect, Pierre Racine de Rocheville, designed the plans of the manufactory, in 1753. Pierre Racine de Rocheville built, for the first time, a tannery based on a scientific study to create a model of tannery. The tannery was considered a marriage of scientific approach and aesthetic beauty for its time.

=== The activity of the manufacture until 1850 ===
The activity of the tannery officially began in 1754. Joseph Duclos was then the director of the factory while his brother Jean-Barthélémy lived in Valencia, Spain, probably as an intermediary for Spanish orders. In 1758, the intendant of Etigny took an inventory of the production stock, which represented 9,000 leathers worth 156,690 pounds. The inventory also listed a large number of untanned leathers probably relating to an order from Spain. Thanks to new partners and the 7-year war between France and England from 1756 to 1763, the Manufactory supplied the hides necessary for the manufacture of military footwear. In 1762, an order amounting to 76,000 pounds was recorded in the accounts for the manufacture of 20,000 pairs of shoes for military troops.

In the absence of successors, the activity came to a halt in 1850. The magnificent Lectoure factory, classified as a historical monument in 2018, remained an important monument in the town until its revival in 2021.

== Revival since 2021 ==
In 2021 French entrepreneur Franck Dahan acquired the brand name. Artistic director Ramesh Nair drew inspiration from the history of the tannery to revive Joseph Duclos as a heritage luxury brand using fine leathers and traditional crafts to create leather goods, perfumes and accessories. The flagship store of Joseph Duclos is located in Paris on 54, rue du Faubourg Saint-Honoré.

== Bibliography ==
- Histoire de Lectoure, sous la direction de Maurice Bordes et Georges Courtès, Lectoure, 1972.
- Collectif, Sites et monuments du Lectourois, Auch, imprimerie Bouquet, 1974
- Archives & culture – Les Duclos – Collection les dictions patronymiques - 1994
- Maurice Bordes, Les Frères Duclos et la tannerie royale de Lectoure au xviii^{e} siècle, Bulletin du comité des travaux historiques, 1954, p. 91-102
- Notice n^{o} PA32000020 [archive], base Mérimée, ministère français de la Culture
- Lettres Patentes signées à Versailles - 1754
