= Le Canadien =

Nationalist newspaper published in Lower Canada

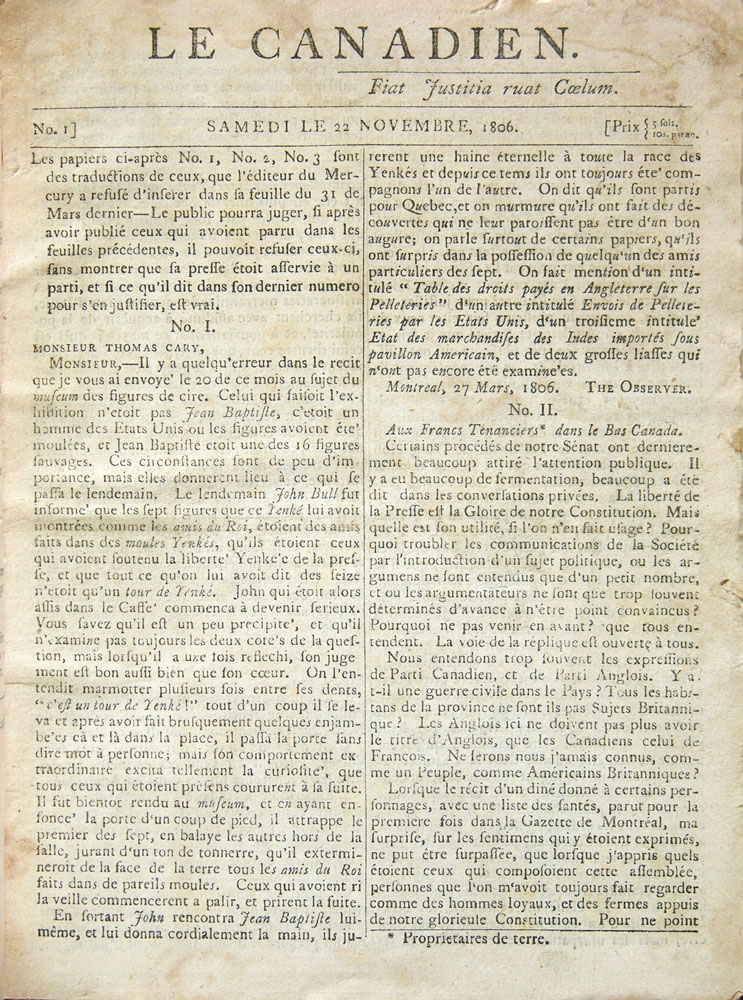
- Front page of Le Canadien, November 22, 1806, vol. 1, no 1.
- Type: Weekly newspaper
- Format: Tabloid
- Owner: Pierre-Stanislas Bédard
- Founded: November 22, 1806
- Language: French
- Headquarters: Quebec City, Montreal
- ISSN: 0705-7679
- OCLC number: 20501607

Le Canadien (French pronunciation: [lə kanadjɛ̃]) was a French language newspaper published at various times in Lower Canada, then the Province of Canada, and finally the province of Quebec, at various times in the 19th century. It went through three different publication phases, with interruptions in publishing.

The paper was dedicated to French-Canadian nationalism, particularly in the first half of the century, during the struggles of the Canadiens with the British colonial government. During this period, the paper published articles and commentary on the political issues of the day, and also more general articles on constitutional structure and governance. It was a supporter of the Parti canadien in the 1810s and 1820s, which developed into the Parti patriote in the 1830s.

Twice, members of the editorial and publishing staff were imprisoned by the British colonial government on grounds of sedition.

The paper's final publication was in 1893.

== History ==
=== First publication: 1806 to 1810 ===
The newspaper was founded in Quebec City on November 22, 1806 and published until shut down by the colonial government on March 14, 1810. Its masthead motto at this time was Fiat justitia ruat caelum (Latin for "Let justice be done though the heavens fall"). It was released every Saturday and the yearly subscription was of 10 chelins or shillings.

The publishers were Pierre-Stanislas Bédard and associates François Blanchet, Jean-Antoine Panet, Jean-Thomas Taschereau and Joseph Le Vasseur Borgia. All were members of the Parliament of Lower Canada at the time. The editor was Jean-Antoine Bouthillier. The newspaper quickly became the voice of the Parti canadien in their battle against the English party and the government of governor James Craig.

On March 17, 1810, the press and the papers of the editorial office on rue Saint-François were seized by the government. The printer Charles Lefrançois was imprisoned and a patrol searched the city for conspirators. The Quebec Mercury had previously insinuated that the French Canadians and the Americans were plotting against England. Two days later, no conspirators had been found. Bédard, Blanchet and Taschereau were arrested and also jailed.

The prisoners were refused habeas corpus. While in prison, Bédard was nominated as member of parliament in the Surrey riding and elected at the general election of March 27, 1810. In 1811, MP Louis-Joseph Papineau asked Governor Craig to clear Bédard of all charges. Governor Craig refused. Bédard was finally ordered out of prison at the end of the Legislative Assembly's session. He was never tried.

=== Second publication: 1817 to 1825 ===
In 1817, the paper was revived by François Blanchet as publisher and Flavien Vallerand as editor. The paper continued to support the Parti canadien, now coming under the leadership of Louis-Joseph Papineau and John Neilson. The new version of the paper was sometimes referred to as Le Petit Canadien, to distinguish it from its major predecessor.

One of the contributing writers was a young student, Augustin-Norbert Morin. When Morin left Quebec to study law in Montreal, his place was taken by Étienne Parent as editor and main writer, from 1822 to 1825. Parent instituted the masthead motto: "Nos institutions, notre langue et nos droits" ("Our institutions, our language, our rights").

This version of the paper lasted until 1825. A rival paper, La Gazette de Québec, became more partisan and attracted the supporters of the Parti canadien. Losing its readership, Le Canadien folded.

=== Final publication ===
Le Canadien disappeared on February 11, 1893, then owned by Joseph-Israël Tarte.

== See also ==
- History of Canadian newspapers
- La Minerve
- List of Quebec media
- Patriote movement
- History of Quebec
- Timeline of Quebec history
- List of newspapers in Canada
