= Joseph Beauchamp =

Canadian politician (1739–1825)

Joseph Beauchamp (June 20, 1739 – June 27, 1825) was a farmer and political figure in Lower Canada. He represented Surrey in the Legislative Assembly of Lower Canada from 1809 to 1810.

He was born in Lachenaie, the son of Joseph Beauchamp and Marie Martel. Beauchamp operated a farm at Varennes. He served as a lieutenant in the militia, later reaching the rank of captain. Beauchamp was married twice: first to Marie Girard in 1761 and then, in 1822, to Marie-Anne-Julie Rocbert de La Morandière, the widow of Joseph Crevier Duvernay, who was the mother of Ludger Duvernay. He did not run for reelection to the assembly in 1810. Beauchamp died in Varennes at the age of 86.
