= Louis Legendre (Lower Canada politician) =

Canadian politician

Louis Legendre (February 5, 1779 – December 12, 1860) was a land surveyor and politician in Lower Canada. He represented Buckinghamshire in the Legislative Assembly of Lower Canada from 1808 to 1809. His name also appears as Louis Le Gendre.

He was born in Sainte-Croix-de-Lotbinière, the son of François Legendre and Marie-Joseph Lemay. Legendre obtained his commission as surveyor in 1800. He settled in Saint-Louis parish at Lotbinière. Legendre did not run for reelection to the assembly in 1809. He was named magistrate for Quebec district in 1815. In the same year, he married Julie Hamelin. Legendre served as captain in the militia, reaching the rank of lieutenant-colonel in 1827. In 1838, he was named a commissioner for the summary trial of minor causes. Legendre died in Deschaillons at the age of 81.

His older brother François Legendre also served as a member of the assembly.
