= Jean-Baptiste Bédard (politician) =

Canadian politician and labourer

Jean-Baptiste Bédard (February 25, 1763 – 1815) was a labourer and political figure in Lower Canada. He represented Quebec county in the Legislative Assembly of Lower Canada from 1810 to 1814.

He was born in Charlesbourg, the son of Charles Bédard and Marie Jobin. In 1794, he married Josephte Delâge. Bédard did not run for reelection to the assembly in 1814. He died in Charlesbourg at the age of 53.
