= Augustin-Jérôme Raby =

Canadian politician

Augustin-Jérôme Raby (November 10, 1745 – September 20, 1822) was a maritime pilot and political figure in Lower Canada.

He was born in Quebec City in 1745, the son of Augustin Raby, and apprenticed as a seaman. He took part in the defence of the town during the American invasion of 1775–6. During the 1780s, he was licensed as a pilot for the Saint Lawrence River. He was elected to the Legislative Assembly of Lower Canada for the Lower Town of Quebec in 1796 and for the Upper Town in 1800. In 1797, he was named superintendent of Saint Lawrence Pilots. Raby was named an officer of Trinity House of Quebec when it was formed in 1805. Later in life, he had difficulty keeping up with the physical demands of his work and Robert Young assumed his duties without pay with the understanding that he would be granted the post after Raby died.

He died at Quebec City in 1822.

His daughter Julie married Charles Langevin who also served in the legislative assembly.
