= Elzéar Bédard =

Canadian politician

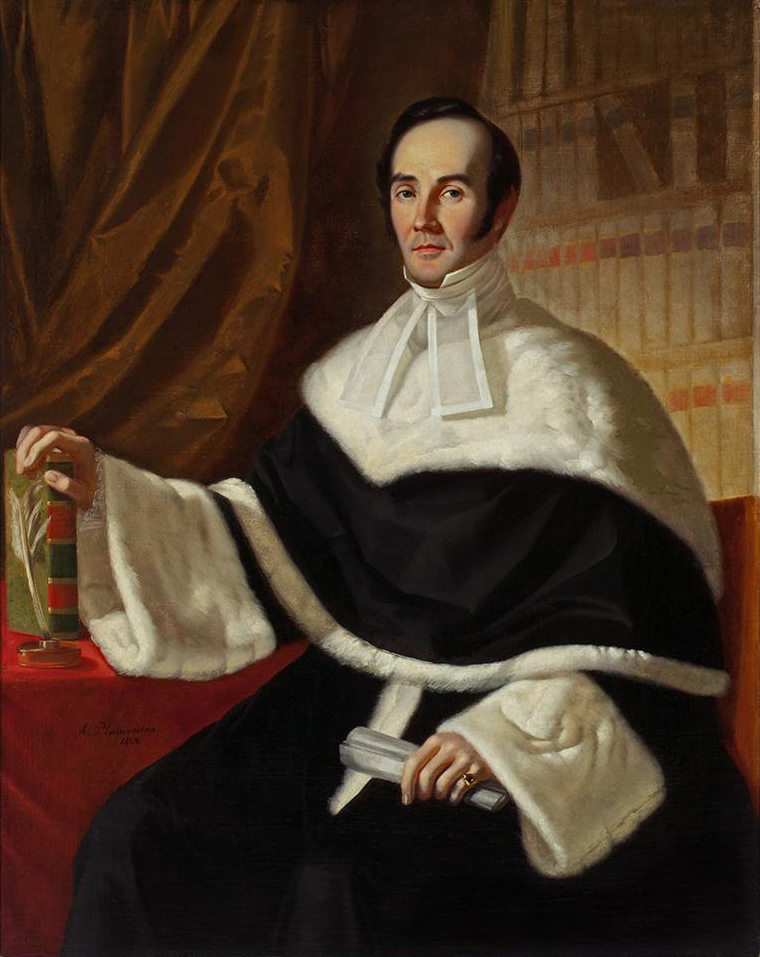
- Bedard by Antoine Plamondon, 1846

Member of the Legislative Assembly of Lower Canada
- In office July 1832 – February 1836
- Preceded by: Philippe Panet
- Succeeded by: Nicolas Lefrançois
- Constituency: Montmorency

1st Mayor of Quebec City
- In office 1 May 1833 – 31 March 1834
- Succeeded by: René-Édouard Caron

Personal details
- Born: 24 July 1799 Quebec City, Lower Canada
- Died: 11 August 1849 (aged 50) Montreal, Canada East
- Spouse(s): Julie-Henriette Marett (m. May 1827)
- Profession: lawyer, judge

Elzéar Bédard (24 July 1799 – 11 August 1849) was a lawyer and a member of the Legislative Assembly of Lower Canada. He later became a judge.

He was born at Quebec City in 1799, the son of Pierre-Stanislas Bédard. Bédard received a typical education for the time which he completed in 1818. He then pursued a career in the priesthood but abandoned this and in 1819 articled to become a lawyer which took place in 1824. By 1830, he was involved in provincial politics and ran unsuccessfully in Kamouraska. He won a by-election in 1832 for Montmorency, a riding left vacant by Philippe Panet. He aligned himself with Louis-Joseph Papineau's Patriote party program and in 1834 was the member who introduced the Ninety-Two Resolutions, although likely he did not have a significant role in the preparation.

He was the first mayor of Quebec City, (1833–1834), but lost the next election to René-Édouard Caron. A close friend and supporter of Archibald Acheson, he was appointed a judge of the Court of King's Bench in 1836, an appointment that was called bribery by his radical adversaries in the Patriote party.
