= Olivier Durocher (Quebec politician) =

Canadian politician (1743–1821)

Olivier Durocher (November 12, 1743 – July 2, 1821) was a farmer and political figure in Lower Canada.

He was born in Lanoraie in 1743, the son of Olivier Durocher, a doctor and merchant from Angers, France, and Thérèse Juillet, descended from one of the members of Adam Dollard des Ormeaux's party at Long Sault. Durocher served as a major in the militia. He was elected to the Legislative Assembly of Lower Canada for Surrey in 1796.

He died at Saint-Antoine-sur-Richelieu in 1821.

His daughter, Eulalie Durocher, was the founder of the Sisters of the Holy Names of Jesus and Mary in Canada.
