= Joseph Drapeau =

Canadian politician

Joseph Drapeau (April 13, 1752 – November 3, 1810) was a seigneur, merchant and political figure in Lower Canada. He represented Northumberland in the Legislative Assembly of Lower Canada from 1809 to 1810.

He was born in Pointe-Lévy, the son of Pierre Drapeau and Marie-Joseph Huard, dit Désilets. Drapeau moved to Quebec City during the 1770s. In 1779, he obtained a permit to sell alcoholic beverages and, in 1781, a hotel-keeper's licence. He also operated a general store in the Lower Town of Quebec City and supplied goods to merchants Louis Bourdages and Louis Bélair. Drapeau married Marie-Geneviève Noël, the daughter of the seigneur of Tilly, in 1782. He was an officer in the militia and served during the American invasion of 1795–1796. In 1799, he owned a shipbuilding yard at Baie-Saint-Paul. He was able to acquire the seigneuries of Champlain, Lessard (also known as Pointe-au-Père), Rimouski and Saint-Barnabé, Grand-Métis, Pachot (also known as Rivière-Mitis) and Sainte-Claire. After selling part of his holdings, Drapeau then purchased half of the seigneury of Île-d'Orléans. For a time, he also owned a small portion of the seigneuries of Rigaud-Vaudreuil, Gentilly, Perthuis, Beauvais, Rivière-Duchesne, and Sainte-Barbe-de-la-Famine. He died in office in Quebec City at the age of 58.

His grandson Ulric-Joseph Tessier served in the legislative assembly for the Province of Canada and the Canadian senate and was also mayor of Quebec City.
