= Jean-Marie Poulin =

Canadian politician

Jean-Marie Poulin (January 7, 1756 – July 14, 1820) was a farmer and political figure in Lower Canada. He represented Northumberland in the Legislative Assembly of Lower Canada from 1800 to 1809.

He was born Jean-Baptiste Poulin in Saint-Joachim-de-Montmorency, the son of Joseph Poulin and Agnès Bolduc. Poulin served as a major in the militia. In 1778, he married Marie-Françoise Pepin dit Lachance. He did not run for reelection in 1809. Poulin died in Saint-Joachim-de-Montmorency at the age of 64.
