= François Legendre =

Canadian politician

François Legendre (1763 – February 4, 1853) was a surveyor, seigneur and political figure in Lower Canada. His name sometimes appears as François d'Assise; his surname also appears as Le Gendre.

He was born at Sainte-Croix-de-Lotbinière in 1763 and studied at the Petit Séminaire de Québec. He apprenticed as a surveyor with Jeremiah McCarthy, qualified to practice in 1792 and set up practice at Gentilly. In 1804, he was elected to the Legislative Assembly of Lower Canada for Buckingham; he was reelected in 1809 and 1810. He married Marie-Anne, the daughter of seigneur Louis Proulx, in 1810. Legendre served as lieutenant-colonel in the local militia during the War of 1812. He was named justice of the peace in 1820 and he served as commissioner for several public works projects in the region. In 1828, he received the seigneuries of La Lussodière and Saint-François from his father-in-law.

He died at Gentilly in 1853.

His brother Louis also represented Buckingham in the legislative assembly. His son François-Félix also became a surveyor and married Marie-Reine, the daughter of Joseph-Édouard Turcotte; their son Napoléon Legendre became a lawyer, journalist and author.
