= Alexandre Dumas (merchant) =

Canadian politician (c.1726–1802)

Alexandre Dumas (c. 1726 – July 11, 1802) was a lawyer, notary, businessman and political figure in Lower Canada.

A Huguenot, Dumas was born in Nègrepelisse, France around 1726 and came to New France in 1751 with a cousin Jean Dumas Saint-Martin as representatives of a French merchant. He was involved with the fisheries in the Gulf of Saint Lawrence and was also involved in retail trade. With a partner, he operated a grist mill on the Saint-Charles River. He renounced his faith in 1760 to marry a Roman Catholic, Josephte Laroche, widow of Jean Requiem, a ship's captain. In 1767, with others, he obtained a lease on the seigneury of Saint-Maurice and the Saint-Maurice ironworks. Dumas served as a captain in the militia and helped defend the town of Quebec against the Americans in 1775; he remained active in the militia becoming lieutenant-colonel by 1802. In 1776, he married Marie-Françoise Fornel, the daughter of Louis Fornel and the widow of Antoine-Florent Meignot. In 1778, Dumas became sole lessee of the ironworks, holding it until 1783, when the lease was taken over by Conrad Gugy. Dumas qualified to practice as a notary in 1784; he qualified to practice as a lawyer the following year. He was elected to the Legislative Assembly of Lower Canada for Dorchester County in 1796.

In 1802, he married Catherine, the daughter of Jean-Thomas Lée, a merchant whose son Thomas later also served as a member of the legislative assembly. Dumas died at Quebec City later that year.
