= Louis-Marie-Joseph Beaumont =

Canadian politician

Louis-Marie-Joseph Beaumont (December 8, 1753 – November 14, 1828) was a farmer and political figure in Lower Canada. He represented Leinster in the Legislative Assembly of Lower Canada from 1800 to 1804.

He was born in Montreal, the son of François Beaumont, dit Pistolet and Françoise Boucher. In 1780, he married Marie-Rose Gauthier. Beaumont operated a farm at Lachenaie. He did not run for reelection in 1804. In 1821, he was named a justice of the peace. Beaumont died in Lachenaie at the age of 74.
