= Jean-Baptiste Durocher =

Canadian politician (1754–1811)

Jean-Baptiste Durocher (August 15, 1754 – July 8, 1811) was a businessman and political figure in Lower Canada.

He was born Jean-Baptiste-Amable Desrocher in L'Assomption, New France in 1754, the son of Jean-Baptiste Desrocher and the greatgrandson of Joseph Durocher, a merchant and tailor who came to New France from Angers, France. He entered business as a merchant at Montreal and was also involved in the fur trade at Detroit. In 1782, Durocher married Marie-Joseph, the daughter of Charles Curot; she died in 1785. In 1792, he married Charlotte, the daughter of merchant Eustache Trottier Desrivières Beaubien and the niece of François Malhiot. In that same year, he was elected to the 1st Parliament of Lower Canada for Montreal West; he was elected again for Montreal County in 1808, 1809 and 1810. He generally supported the parti canadien. Durocher was named a justice of the peace in 1800. He was a member of the Club des Apôtres at Montreal, a club with 12 members that held monthly suppers. Durocher served in the local militia, becoming major in 1809. Governor James Henry Craig relieved him of this post in 1810 because he support a bill which made judges ineligible to serve in the assembly.

He died in office at Montreal in 1811. Durocher's second wife had died in 1805.
