= Alexandre Menut =

Canadian politician

Alexandre Menut (died after March 1804) was a businessman and political figure in Lower Canada.

He was born in France and came to Quebec as a cook for Governor James Murray, later performing the same job for Governor Guy Carleton. In 1768, he opened an inn at Quebec City; he opened a tavern the following year. He was a member of the militia but did not participate in the defence of the town during the American invasion of 1775–6; Benedict Arnold set up headquarters there. His inn suffered damages during the invasion and he opened a new establishment in 1782. He was a member of the Quebec Fire Society. In 1796, Menut was elected to the Legislative Assembly of Lower Canada for Cornwallis, supporting the parti canadien. He was reelected in 1800 and generally supported the English party.

He died between March 1804 and March 1806.

His son Henry also later served in the legislative assembly.
