= Joseph Le Vasseur Borgia =

Canadian politician

Joseph Le Vasseur Borgia (January 6, 1773 – June 28, 1839) was a lawyer, newspaper owner and political figure in Lower Canada.

He was born at Quebec in 1773, the son of a blacksmith, and studied at the Petit Séminaire de Québec. He articled as a lawyer, qualified to practice in 1800 and set up practice at Quebec. Le Vasseur Borgia helped found Le Canadien in 1806. In 1808, he was elected to the Legislative Assembly of Lower Canada for Cornwallis, representing it until 1820 when he was defeated, and then again from 1824 to 1830. For his association with Le Canadien, he was removed from his post in the militia in 1808 but he was named a militia captain in 1812 by Governor George Prevost.

He died at Quebec City in 1839 and was buried in the Cimetière des Picotés there. Le Vasseur Borgia had one son, Narcisse-Charles, who predeceased his father in 1834.
