= Pierre-Dominique Debartzch =

Canadian politician

Pierre-Dominique Debartzch (September 22, 1782 – September 6, 1846) was a lawyer, seigneur, newspaper owner and political figure in Lower Canada.

He was born in Saint-Charles-sur-Richelieu in 1782, the son of a merchant of Polish descent (Dominica’s Bartzsch arrived in New France around 1752), and studied at Harvard College. He articled in law with Denis-Benjamin Viger and was called to the bar in 1806. Debartzch was elected to the Legislative Assembly of Lower Canada for Kent in 1809 and again in 1810. He supported the parti canadien. Debartzch was a captain in the militia and led a company at the Battle of Châteauguay. In 1814, he was named to the Legislative Council. In 1815, Debartzch married Josette, the daughter of legislative councillor Charles de Saint-Ours and Josette Murray, whose great-uncle was former governor James Murray. In 1822, he helped lead opposition to a plan to unite Upper and Lower Canada. He purchased the seigneury of Saint-François (also known as Saint-Charles) in 1826. He founded the newspaper L'Écho du pays in 1833 and then Le Glaneur in 1836. He served on the Executive Council from 1837 to 1841. In 1841, Debartzch bought the seigneury of Cournoyer.

He died at Saint-Marc-sur-Richelieu in 1846 and was buried at Saint-Charles-sur-Richelieu.

His maternal uncle Hyacinthe-Marie Simon, dit Delorme also served in the legislative assembly. His daughter Josette-Elmire married Lewis Thomas Drummond and his daughter Louise-Aurélie married Alexandre-Édouard Kierzkowski. His daughter Caroline married lawyer Samuel Cornwallis Monk; their son Frederick Debartzch Monk later served in the Canadian House of Commons. His daughter Margueritte-Cordelia married Édouard-Sylvestre de Rottermund, a chemist and inventor.
