= Hyacinthe-Marie Simon, dit Delorme =

Canadian politician

Hyacinthe-Marie Simon dit Delorme (August 15, 1777 – March 13, 1814) was a seigneur and political figure in Lower Canada. He represented Richelieu in the Legislative Assembly of Lower Canada from 1808 to 1814. His name also appears as Hyacinthe-Marie Delorme.

He was born in Saint-Denis, the son of seigneur Jacques-Hyacinthe Simon dit Delorme and Marie-Anne Crevier Décheneaux. He inherited part of the seigneury of Saint-Hyacinthe on the death of his father in October 1778; his mother acted on his behalf until he reached the age of majority. In 1803, he was named a commissioner of the peace. In 1810, Simon dit Delorme donated land for the construction of the Collège de Saint-Hyacinthe. He served as lieutenant-colonel in the militia and commanded the Saint-Hyacinthe division during the War of 1812. He died in office at Saint-Hyacinthe at the age of 36.

His cousin Jean Dessaulles and nephew Pierre-Dominique Debartzch also served in the assembly. His sister Marianne-Josette married Claude Dénéchau.
