= George Pyke (politician) =

Canadian politician

George Pyke (January 19, 1775 – February 3, 1851) was a lawyer, judge and political figure in Lower Canada. His surname is sometimes recorded as Pike.

He was born in Halifax, Nova Scotia in 1775, the son of John George Pyke, and studied law with Richard John Uniacke, Jr. He was called to the Quebec bar in 1796. In 1799, he was appointed deputy surveyor general for Lower Canada. Pyke was elected to the Legislative Assembly of Lower Canada for Gaspé in 1804 and represented the region until 1814. He was named advocate general for the province in 1812. In 1820, he was named judge in the Court of King's Bench at Montreal. From 1839 to 1842, he took on the functions of chief justice, without receiving the title. In 1842, he retired from the bench at the request of Governor Sir Charles Bagot.

In 1811, Pyke published Cases argued and determined in the Court of King's Bench for the district of Quebec in the province of Lower-Canada ..., the first collection of decisions compiled for Lower Canada.

Pyke owned a large amount of property in the Eastern Townships and a large estate at Pointe-à-Cavagnal (later Hudson, Quebec). He died at his estate in 1851.

His sister Anne married James Irvine, who also served in the legislative assembly. His daughter Eliza Phoebe married Henry Pryor, who became a member of the provincial assembly and mayor of Halifax.
