= Étienne-Ferréol Roy =

Canadian politician

Étienne-Ferréol Roy (1771 – November 22, 1852) was a seigneur and political figure in Lower Canada. He represented Hertford in the Legislative Assembly of Lower Canada from 1804 to 1820.

He was born in Beaumont, the son of seigneur Joseph Roy and Gabrielle Sarault. He inherited the seigneury of Varennes from his father in 1791; Roy sold the seigneury in 1847. In 1792, he married Marie-Charlotte Talbot dit Gervais. He was a major in the militia, reaching the rank of lieutenant-colonel in 1815. Roy did not run for reelection in 1820. He died in Beaumont.

His sister Marie-Gabriel married Louis Blais.
