= Joseph Meunier =

Canadian farmer and politician

Joseph Meunier (March 1, 1755 – December 31, 1829) was a farmer and political figure in Lower Canada. He represented Effingham in the Legislative Assembly of Lower Canada from 1808 to 1814.

He was born in Ancienne-Lorette, New France, the son of Joseph Meunier and Charlotte Bussière. In 1778, Meunier married Marie Gauthier-Landreville. He did not run for reelection in 1814. Meunier died in Sainte-Rose at the age of 74.
