= Louis Roy Portelance =

Canadian politician

Louis Roy Portelance (October 16, 1764 – March 2, 1838) was a businessman and political figure in Lower Canada.

He was born at Pointe-Claire in 1764, the son of a farmer, and studied at the Collège Saint-Raphaël. He then entered the fur trade as a voyageur. In 1791, Portelance married his cousin Marie-Josephte, daughter of François Périnault and widow of silversmith Jacques Varin. Soon afterwards, Portelance entered the lumber trade, supplying boards and planks for construction in Montreal. He was elected to the Legislative Assembly of Lower Canada to represent Montreal County in 1804 and represented it until 1814. In 1809, he married Louise, the daughter of merchant Jacques Languedoc and sister of François Languedoc, who later became a member of the legislative assembly. Portelance was elected to represent Montreal East in 1816. He generally supported the parti canadien in the assembly. He retired from the lumber business around 1820. He helped found La Banque du Peuple in 1837.

He died at Kamouraska in Lower Canada in 1838.
