= Pierre Langlois (politician) =

Canadian politician

Pierre Langlois (French pronunciation: [pjɛʁ lɑ̃ɡlwa]; June 14, 1750 – January 2, 1830) was a merchant and political figure in Lower Canada. He represented Dorchester in the Legislative Assembly of Lower Canada from 1808 to 1814.

He was born in Saint-Laurent on the île d'Orléans, the son of Jean Langlois and Éléonore Nolin. His father was captured at the Battle of the Plains of Abraham and sent to England where he later died. He was in business at Quebec City. Langlois was an unsuccessful candidate for the Buckingham seat in 1795. He did not run for reelection to the assembly in 1814. Langlois died in Quebec City at the age of 79.
