= Louis Bourdages =

Canadian politician

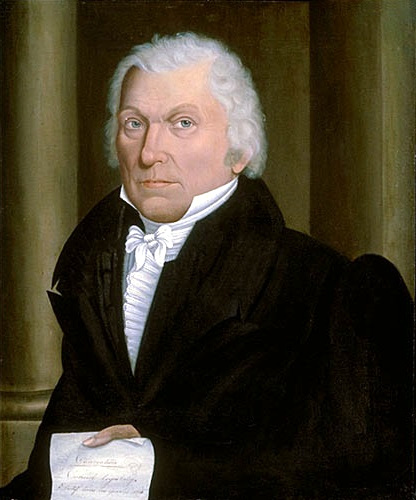
Louis Bourdages by Jean-Baptiste Roy-Audy, 1834

Louis Bourdages (July 6, 1764 – January 20, 1835) was a businessman and political figure in Lower Canada.

He was born Louis-Marie Bourdages in Jeune-Lorette, Quebec in 1764, the son of Raymond Bourdages, an Acadian doctor and merchant. Bourdages studied at the Petit Séminaire de Québec, where he met Pierre-Stanislas Bédard. After he left school, he became a sailor and travelled to Europe and the West Indies. He returned to Quebec City in 1787, where he was unsuccessful in establishing himself as a merchant, and moved to Saint-Denis on the Richelieu River in 1790 where he became a farmer. He later articled as a notary and qualified to practice in 1805. Bourdages also became an important land-owner in the region.

In 1804, he was elected to the Legislative Assembly of Lower Canada for Richelieu; he represented this region until 1814. In 1806, he helped found Le Canadien. Bourdages was generally opposed to measures intended to put an end to seigneurial tenure. During the War of 1812, he served in the local militia, reaching the rank of lieutenant-colonel. He was elected in Buckinghamshire in an 1815 by-election and then represented it from 1820 to 1830, when Buckinghamshire was reorganized. He then represented Nicolet in the assembly from 1830 until his death at Saint-Denis in 1835. Bourdages helped prepare the Ninety-Two Resolutions submitted to the British government in 1834. In January 1835, he suffered an attack of apoplexy and died several days later.

His son Rémi-Séraphin, who represented Rouville in the legislative assembly, died before his father in 1832.
