= Jérôme Martineau =

Canadian politician

Jérôme Martineau (March 6, 1750 – December 19, 1809) was a businessman and politician in the Province of Quebec and Lower Canada.

The son of a farmer, he was born and raised in Sainte-Famille on the Île d'Orléans. He later moved to Quebec City, becoming paymaster and business agent for the Séminaire de Québec. He profited by obtaining grants of land in the seigneury of Île-Jésus near Montreal then owned by the Séminaire and later selling them. Because not all of these dealings were legal, Martineau lost his position with the Séminaire after his actions were discovered. He continued as a merchant, selling dry goods, wheat and flour, and also continued to invest in property.

In 1796, he was elected to the Legislative Assembly of Lower Canada for the Île d’Orléans. He represented this region in the assembly until his death in 1809 at Quebec City. He generally supported the parti canadien but opposed the bill making judges ineligible to sit in the assembly and mainly supported the English party during his final term in office.
