= John Mure =

Canadian politician (c.1776–1823)

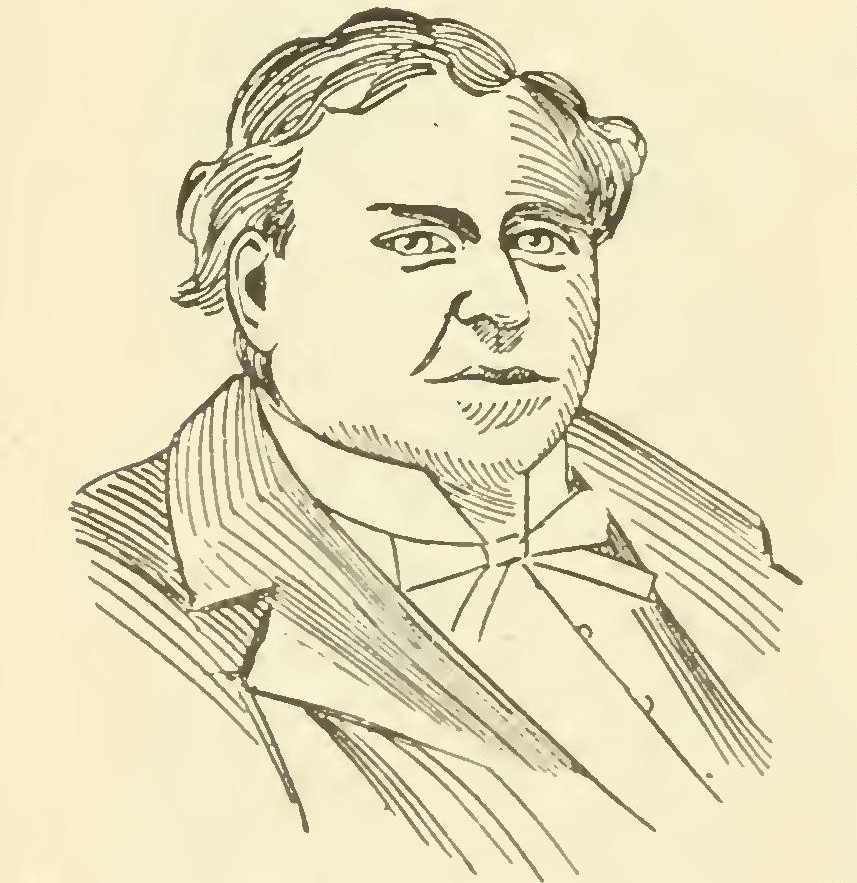

Member of the Legislative Assembly of Lower Canada for York
- In office 1804–1810

Personal details
- Born: 1776 Probably in Kilmarnock, Scotland
- Died: January 17, 1823 (aged 46–47) Glasgow, Scotland
- Occupation: Businessman, Politician, Fur Trader, Coroner

John Mure (ca.1776 – January 17, 1823) was a businessman and political figure in Lower Canada.

== Biography ==
He was born in Scotland around 1776, probably in Kilmarnock parish, and had arrived in Montreal by 1782. In 1778, he was hired by James Tod as a clerk at Quebec City. He later went into business on his own, involved in the fur trade and the importing of goods. In 1796, with Tod and others, he was purchased the fiefs of Grosse-Île and Granville. He married his cousin, Margaret Porteous, in 1798; she died the following year and their child died while still very young. Mure was involved in a conglomerate of companies that took part in the fur trade, supplied traders and merchants and trans-Atlantic shipping. He later became a partner in the XY Company and then in the North West Company.

Mure also took part in the timber trade. In 1799, he was named justice of the peace. In 1804, he was elected to the Legislative Assembly of Lower Canada for York in the Ottawa valley; he was reelected there in 1808 and 1809. In 1810, he was elected to the legislative assembly for the Lower Town of Quebec. He was named to the Executive Council in 1812. Mure served as an officer in the local militia during the War of 1812. He had also served as assistant coroner for Quebec district from 1807 to 1811. In 1817, he dissolved his company and arrived in Glasgow later that year. He died at Glasgow in 1823.
