= Ross Cuthbert (politician) =

Canadian writer, lawyer and politician

Ross Cuthbert (February 17, 1776 – August 28, 1861) was a Canadian writer, lawyer and politician.

Born at Berthier and baptised at Montreal, as the son of James Cuthbert, he was heir to the seigneuries of Lanoraie and Dautray. He studied at Douai in France and completed his studies in law in Philadelphia where he married Emily Rush, daughter of Benjamin Rush, one of the signatories of the United States Declaration of Independence. In 1809, Cuthbert was elected a member of the American Philosophical Society.

Cuthbert sat at the Executive Council and represented Warwick County (later Berthier) in the Legislative Assembly of Lower Canada. He published Aéropage in Quebec City in 1803 and New theory of the tides in 1810.

He died in Berthier-en-Haut, Canada East in 1861.

His brother James also represented Warwick in the legislative assembly.
