= François Bernier (politician) =

Canadian politician and farmer

François Bernier (October 20, 1753 – June 7, 1823) was a farmer and political figure in Lower Canada. He represented Devon in the Legislative Assembly of Lower Canada from 1796 to 1814.

He was born in Cap-Saint-Ignace, the son of Augustin Bernier and Marie-Angélique Buteau. He operated a farm there and later lived as a person of independent means. In 1772, he married Ursule Bernier, a relative. Bernier did not run for reelection in 1814. He died in Cap-Saint-Ignace at the age of 69.
