= James Cuthbert Jr. =

Canadian politician

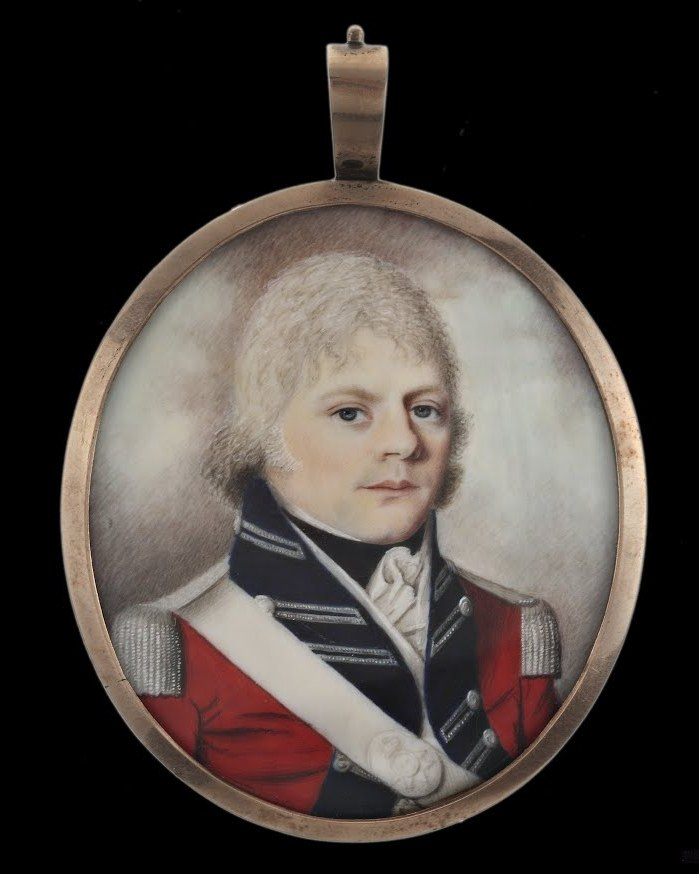
- Cuthbert as a lieutenant of the Royal American Regiment.

Personal details
- Born: June 4, 1769 Berthier, Province of Quebec
- Died: March 5, 1849 (aged 79) Berthier, Province of Canada

James Cuthbert Jr. (June 4, 1769 – March 5, 1849) was a seigneur and political figure in Lower Canada.

He was born at Berthier in 1769, the son of seigneur James Cuthbert, and studied at the English College in Douai, France. He served in the 60th Regiment of the British Army, becoming lieutenant in 1797. Cuthbert inherited the seigneury of Berthier from his father in 1798. He was named justice of the peace for Trois-Rivières district in 1808. He served in the local militia, becoming lieutenant-colonel. He was elected to the Legislative Assembly of Lower Canada for Warwick in 1796 and served until 1811, when he was named to the Legislative Council. Cuthbert had run unsuccessfully for the same seat in the legislative assembly in 1792. At that time, he tried unsuccessfully to have the election of Pierre-Paul Margane de Lavaltrie overturned because Lavaltrie was not a British subject. In 1802, Cuthbert married Marie-Claire, the daughter of judge John Fraser. He married his cousin Mary-Louise-Amable Cairns in 1814. Cuthbert was named to the Special Council that governed the province after the Lower Canada Rebellion.

He was elected a member of the American Antiquarian Society in 1822. During his life he owned 3 slaves in Canada.

He died at his manor at Berthier in 1849.

His son Edward Octavian became a member of the Canadian House of Commons. His brother Ross also represented Warwick in the legislative assembly.
