= Saint-Ours, Quebec =

Saint-Ours
- Town
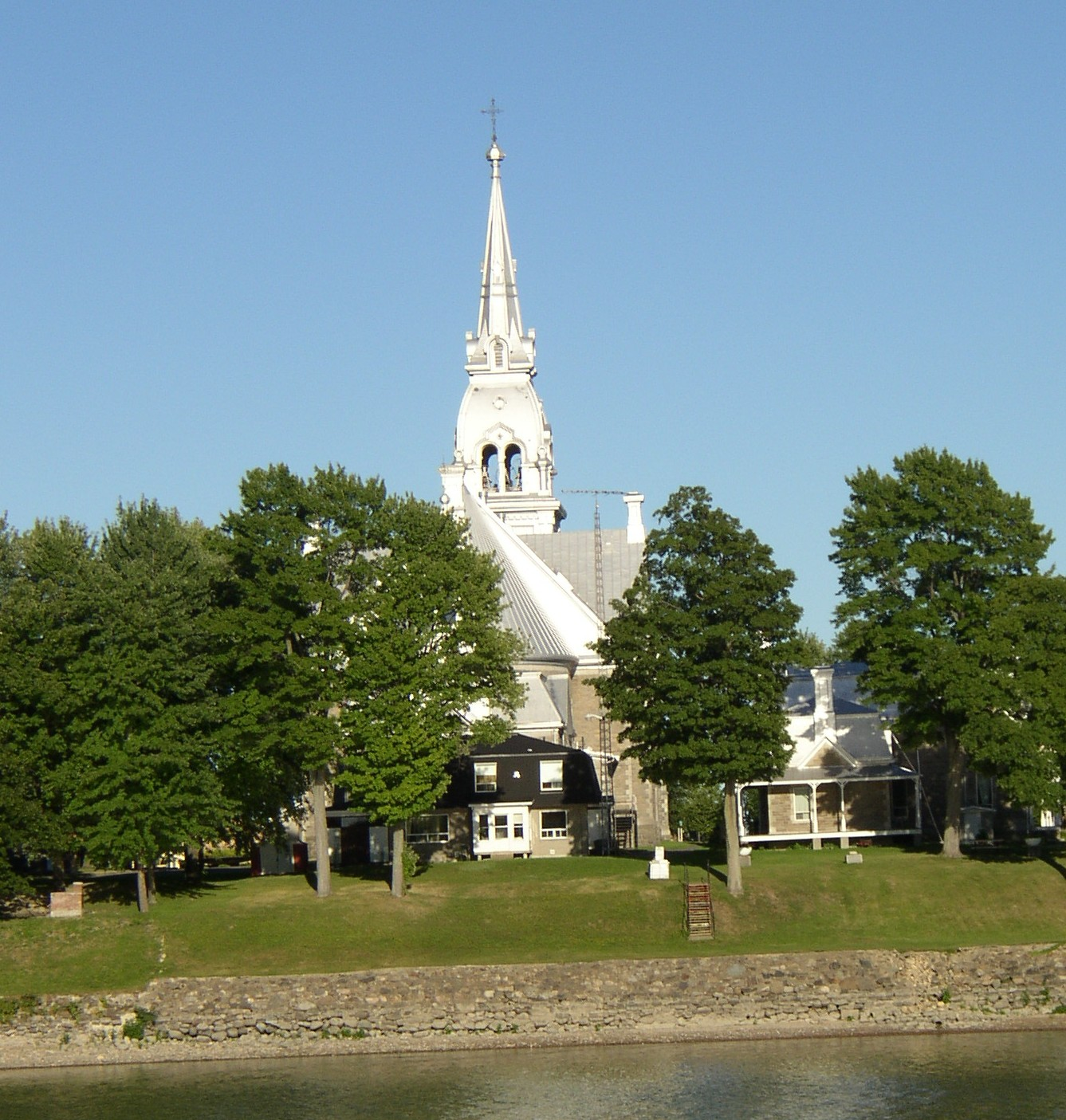
- Saint-Ours church

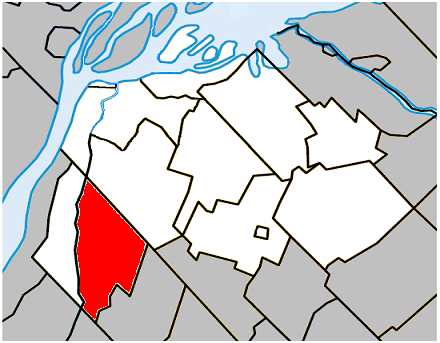
- Location within Pierre-De Saurel RCM

- Location in southern Quebec
- Coordinates: 45°53′N 73°09′W
- Country: Canada
- Province: Quebec
- Region: Montérégie
- RCM: Pierre-De Saurel
- Constituted: April 17, 1991

Government
  - Mayor: Sylvain Dupuis
  - Federal riding: Bécancour—Nicolet—Saurel—Alnôbak
  - Prov. riding: Richelieu

Area
  - Total: 61.00 km^{2} (23.55 sq mi)
  - Land: 59.39 km^{2} (22.93 sq mi)

Population (2011)
  - Total: 1,721
  - Density: 29/km^{2} (75/sq mi)
  - Pop 2006-2011: ▲1.2%
  - Dwellings: 856
- Time zone: UTC−5 (EST)
  - Summer (DST): UTC−4 (EDT)
- Postal code(s): J0G
- Area codes: 450 and 579
- Highways: R-133
- Website: www.ville.saintours.qc.ca

Saint-Ours is a town located in the Pierre-De Saurel Regional County Municipality of Québec (Canada), in the administrative region of Montérégie. The population as of the Canada 2011 Census was 1,721. Founded in 1650 and originally constituent of the Saint-Ours Parish Municipality, which merged alongside L'Immaculée-Conception-de-Saint-Ours municipality in 1991, Saint-Ours is one of the earliest settlements in Montérégie. The town is named in honour of Pierre Roch de Saint-Ours, a captain of a company in the regiment of Carignan-Salières, sent by the king to come to the aid of the colonists of New France, in 1665. Pierre de Saint-Ours was the first lord of these lands.

== Demographics ==
In the 2021 Census of Population conducted by Statistics Canada, Saint-Ours had a population of 1,723 living in 797 of its 858 total private dwellings, a change of 3.2% from its 2016 population of 1,669. With a land area of 59.23 km^{2} (22.87 sq mi), it had a population density of 29.1/km^{2} (75.3/sq mi) in 2021.

Population trend:

Census	Population	Change (%)
2011	1,721	▲1.2%
2006	1,700	▲4.7%
2001	1,624	▲0.3%
1996	1,619	▼0.6%
1991	1,628	N/A

Mother tongue language (2006)

Language	Population	Pct (%)
French only	1,650	97.06%
English only	25	1.47%
Both English and French	0	0.00%
Other languages	25	1.47%

== See also ==
- List of cities in Quebec
