= Pierre-Stanislas Bédard =

Canadian politician

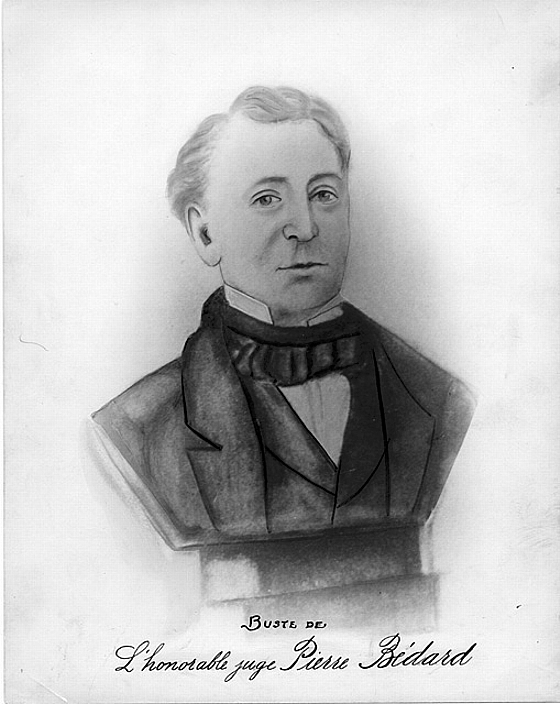
Pierre-Stanislas Bédard

Pierre-Stanislas Bédard (September 13, 1762 – April 26, 1829) was a lawyer, judge, journalist and political figure in Lower Canada.

He was born in Charlesbourg in 1762, descended from French ancestors who had first arrived in New France before 1660. He studied at the Petit Séminaire de Québec, articled in law and was called to the bar in 1790. In 1792, he was elected to the Legislative Assembly of Lower Canada for Northumberland; he was reelected in 1796, 1800 and 1804. In 1796, he married Luce, the daughter of a surgeon, François Lajus. Bédard became leader of the parti canadien. He was one of the founders of the newspaper Le Canadien, which presented the party's views in print, in 1806. In 1808, he was elected in the Lower Town of Quebec and was reelected in 1809.

Bédard saw the legislative assembly as the only government body that represented the people of Lower Canada and so he resented the unchecked power wielded by the appointed councils and government ministers; he felt that ministers should be held accountable to the assembly. He also believed that judges should be kept independent from politics and so should not be allowed to sit in the legislative assembly. He was arrested and imprisoned in 1810 on the orders of Governor James Henry Craig for treasonable activities because of his association with Le Canadien; he was released in March the following year. Bédard represented Surrey in the legislative assembly from 1810 to 1812, when he was named a judge in the Court of King's Bench for Trois-Rivières district. In 1811, James Stuart replaced Bédard as leader of the Parti canadien. During the War of 1812, Bédard served as a captain in the militia. He opposed the union of Upper and Lower Canada and led the opposition to the union in the Trois-Rivières region.

He died in Trois-Rivières in 1829.

His son Elzéar was a member in the legislative assembly, a judge and a mayor of Quebec City. His son Joseph-Isidore also served in the assembly. His brother Joseph was a member of the legislative assembly.
