= 1st Parliament of Lower Canada =

Parliament of Lower Canada 1792–1796

The 1st Parliament of Lower Canada was in session from December 17, 1792, to May 31, 1796. Elections for the Legislative Assembly in Lower Canada had been held in June 1792. All sessions were held at Quebec City.

== Members ==
Riding	Member	First elected	No. of terms
Bedford	Jean-Baptiste-Melchior Hertel de Rouville	1792	1st term
Buckinghamshire	Antoine Juchereau Duchesnay	1792	1st term
Buckinghamshire	Joseph-Marie Godefroy de Tonnancour	1792	1st term
Cornwallis	Pierre-Louis Panet	1792	1st term
Cornwallis	Jean Digé	1792	1st term
Devon	François Dambourgès	1792	1st term
Devon	James Tod	1792	1st term
Dorchester	Gabriel-Elzéar Taschereau	1792	1st term
Dorchester	Ignace-Michel-Louis-Antoine d'Irumberry de Salaberry	1792	1st term
Effingham	Jacob Jordan (Note: died in February 1796)	1792	1st term
Effingham	Joseph-Hubert Lacroix	1792	1st term
Gaspé	Edward O'Hara	1792	1st term
Hampshire	Mathew Macnider	1792	1st term
Hampshire	Jean Boudreau	1792	1st term
Hertford	Louis Dunière	1792	1st term
Hertford	Pierre Marcoux	1792	1st term
Huntingdon	Georges-Hippolyte le Comte Dupré	1792	1st term
Huntingdon	Claude-Nicolas-Guillaume de Lorimier	1792	1st term
Kent	René Boileau	1792	1st term
Kent	Pierre Legras Pierreville	1792	1st term
Leinster	François-Antoine Larocque (Note: died in October 1792; George McBeath was elected in a by-election held in January 1793.)	1792	1st term
Leinster	George McBeath (1793)	1793	1st term
Leinster	Bonaventure Panet	1792	1st term
Montreal County	Joseph Papineau	1792	1st term
Montreal County	James Walker	1792	1st term
Montreal East	Joseph Frobisher	1792	1st term
Montreal East	John Richardson	1792	1st term
Montreal West	Jean-Baptiste Durocher	1792	1st term
Montreal West	James McGill	1792	1st term
Northumberland	Pierre-Stanislas Bédard	1792	1st term
Northumberland	Joseph Dufour dit Bona	1792	1st term
Orléans	Nicolas-Gaspard Boisseau	1792	1st term
Quebec County	David Lynd	1792	1st term
Quebec County	Michel-Amable Berthelot Dartigny (1793) (Note: Ignace-Michel-Louis-Antoine d'Irumberry de Salaberry was elected in both Dorchester and Quebec County; he chose to represent Dorchester and Michel-Amable Berthelot Dartigny was elected in Quebec County in a by-election held in February 1793.)	1793	1st term
Quebec (Lower Town)	Robert Lester	1792	1st term
Quebec (Lower Town)	John Young	1792	1st term
Quebec (Upper Town)	Jean-Antoine Panet	1792	1st term
Quebec (Upper Town)	William Grant	1792	1st term
Richelieu	Pierre Guerout	1792	1st term
Richelieu	Benjamin-Hyacinthe-Martin Cherrier	1792	1st term
Saint-Maurice	Thomas Coffin	1792	1st term
Saint-Maurice	Augustin-Amable Rivard dit Dufresne	1792	1st term
Surrey	François Malhiot	1792	1st term
Surrey	Philippe-François de Rastel de Rocheblave	1792	1st term
Trois-Rivières	John Lees	1792	1st term
Trois-Rivières	Nicolas Saint-Martin	1792	1st term
Warwick	Pierre-Paul Margane de Lavaltrie	1792	1st term
Warwick	Louis Olivier	1792	1st term
William-Henry	John Barnes	1792	1st term
York	Michel-Eustache-Gaspard-Alain Chartier de Lotbinière	1792	1st term
York	Pierre-Amable de Bonne	1792	1st term
