= Tonnancour =

The term Tonnancour may refer to:

== People ==
- Léonard Godefroy de Tonnancour, born on November 6, 1793, and died on January 29, 1867, was a politician of Lower Canada.
- Joseph-Marie Godefroy de Tonnancour (1750) is a Canadian politician. He was the member of the Lower Canada in Buckingham Electoral Districts from 1792 to 1796 at the Lower Canada House of Assembly.
- Marie-Joseph Godefroy de Tonnancour(June 5, 1786 and September 2, 1850) was a seigneur of the seigneurial system of New France and a political figure in Bas-Canada. He represented Trois-Rivières in the Legislative Assembly of Lower Canada in 1820.
