= Legras =

Legras is a surname of French origins. It comes from a nickname in Old French, gras, meaning "fat". Notable people with the surname include:

- Annie Legras, French actress, photographer, and author
- Daniel Legras (born 1957), French sprint canoeist
- Gerry Legras (born 1996), Seychellois boxer
- Guillaume Legras (born 1990), French football midfielder
- Jacques Legras, French actor
- Pierre Legras Pierreville, businessman and politician in Lower Canada

== See also ==
- Callanthias legras, species of marine ray-finned fish
- Legrá, a surname
