= Ezekiel Hart =

Canadian Jewish entrepreneur and politician

Ezekiel Hart Esq.
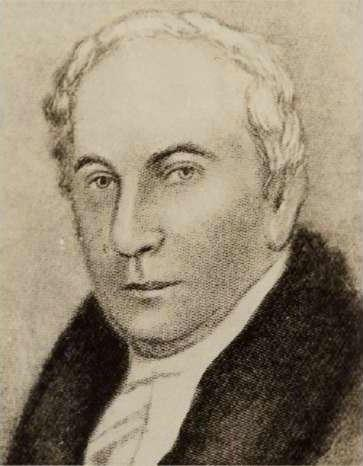

Personal details
- Born: 15 May 1770 Trois-Rivières, Province of Quebec
- Died: 16 September 1843 (aged 73) Trois-Rivières, United Province of Canada
- Spouse: Frances Lazarus (m. 1794; died 1821)
- Occupation: Entrepreneur, politician

Ezekiel Hart (15 May 1770 – 16 September 1843) was an entrepreneur and politician in British North America. He is often said to be the first Jew to be elected to public office in the British Empire.

He was elected twice by the voters of Trois-Rivières to the Legislative Assembly of Lower Canada. Some members consistently prevented him from taking his seat by observing that as a Jew, he could not take the oath of office, which included the phrase "on the true faith of a Christian".

== Biography ==
=== Early life ===
Ezekiel Hart was born May 15, 1770, at Trois-Rivières, Quebec, to Dorothea (née Judah) and Aaron Hart. His father was a member of the British forces, and a well-known and successful businessman in Lower Canada. He obtained part of his education in the United States and, along with his brother Benjamin, served as a colonel in the militia during the American War of Independence. He began participating in his father's fur trade activities in 1792.

On January 29, 1794, he married Frances Lazarus, niece of Ephraim Hart. Hart and his brothers Moses and Benjamin established a brewery in Trois-Rivières, the M. and E. Hart Company, in 1796. He remained a partner for only a few years. He then went into the import and export trade, owned a general store, and acquired property. Ezekiel Hart inherited the seigneury of Bécancour and bought land at Trois-Rivières and Cap-de-la-Madeleine.

=== The Hart Affair ===
On 11 April 1807, Ezekiel Hart was elected to the Legislative Assembly of Lower Canada over three other candidates, obtaining 59 out of the 116 votes cast. This was not the first time a Jew had run for election: Moses Hart, Ezekiel's older brother, had run unsuccessfully for a seat in William-Henry in 1796. The election having taken place on Shabbat, Hart refused to take his oath of allegiance at that time. He would await the opening of the session of the legislature in Quebec the following January.

Hart caused controversy when, being Jewish he swore his oath on a Tanakh, instead of on the Christian Bible, and with his head covered in preparation for taking up his seat on 29 January 1808. (At the time, Jews were accustomed to swearing in courts of law in this manner.) The next day an objection was raised by the attorney general, Jonathan Sewell, seconded by Justice Pierre-Amable de Bonne, that the oath was not taken in the manner required for sitting in the assembly — an oath of abjuration, which would have required Hart to swear "on the true faith of a Christian". Sewell moved that the assembly pass a resolution to this effect, and that Hart be provided with a copy of the resolution, "to the end that he may thereupon pursue such further course in the premises as the law of Parliament may be found to require".

Shortly after, Thomas Coffin, the runner-up in the election in Trois-Rivières, petitioned the assembly, calling for the removal of Hart because, as a Jew, he was "not capable of being elected to serve in the House of Assembly, or of taking the oaths requires, or sitting or voting in the Assembly," and asking that the election be considered null and void and that Coffin be given the seat for Trois-Rivières in his place. On April 18, Le Canadien, the mouthpiece of the Canadian Party, published a poem decrying the choice of a Jew for a seat as even more foolish than Caligula's appointment of his horse as a Roman consul and priest. In the same issue, a more ideologically explicit attack was launched. Many antisemitic letters to the editor were published, one of which argued that the electors of Trois-Rivières should be reprimanded for electing a Jew to office. Sir James Henry Craig, Governor-General and Lieutenant Governor of Lower Canada, tried to protect Hart, but the legislature dismissed him.

Hart petitioned the legislature, saying that, while he believed that he was justified in the law in taking a seat by means of the oath used by Jews in the courts, he was willing to swear the oaths used for those elected to the assembly. After some deliberation, however, on 20 February 1808, the assembly resolved by a vote of 35 to 5 that "Ezekiel Hart, Esquire, professing the Jewish religion cannot take a seat, nor sit, nor vote, in this House."

In 1808, new elections were held, and once again Trois-Rivières returned Hart as one of its two representatives. This time, to avoid controversy, Hart took the oath in the same fashion as a Christian. In his presentation to the assembly, Pierre-Stanislas Bédard, the leader of Le Canadien, argued against granting a seat to Hart in the assembly. He claimed that

"No Christian nation had granted Jews the rights of citizens, not for unjust reasons, but because they themselves do not wish to be part of any country. They may make a country their residence to pursue their business dealings, but never their home. This state of affairs is a result of the Jewish tradition, which requires Jews to wait for the messiah, their prince; while waiting, they cannot pledge allegiance to any other prince."

When the assembly finally reconvened in 1809, Hart sat as a member for Trois-Rivières for a few days. After ascertaining that Hart had been expelled the previous year, the assembly voted to expel him again.

The events of 1807–1809 are known to many as the Hart Affair (French: L'Affaire Hart). Some historians explain these events as the result of the rivalry between the contemporary English and French factions in Lower Canada rather than antisemitism. Some have interpreted this affair as proof of ongoing hostility toward Jews among French Canadians. Ezekiel Hart stated that, with only one exception, his opponents were Catholics, and he assumed they were encouraged in voting against him by their priests.

=== Later life ===
Hart did not run for public office again. He continued to live in Trois-Rivières where he was a successful businessman and well-respected member of the community. He served in the militia during the War of 1812, serving as a lieutenant under Lieutenant Colonel Charles-Michel d'Irumberry de Salaberry in the 8th Battalion of Trois-Rivières militia. He was later promoted colonel in 1830.

His wife died on 21 April 1821, at Trois-Rivières.

On 5 June 1832, mainly because of Hart's activism, the Legislative Assembly of Lower Canada, under the influence and authority of Louis-Joseph Papineau, passed a bill (the 1832 Emancipation Act) that ultimately guaranteed full rights to people practising the Jewish faith, only the second location in the British Empire to do so after Jamaica. Papineau, who became speaker of the Assembly in 1815, earlier had supported Hart's expulsion in 1809. Samuel Becancour Hart, Ezekiel's son, had a strong influence on the legislation, as he, along with several other important Jewish figures, had sent a letter to King William, submitting a petition to the Legislative Assembly demanding that Jews be allowed to hold public office.

Many of Hart's family members were also important people in the community. His brother Benjamin was an important businessman at Montreal. Because of his work, the Legislative Assembly granted Jews the right to erect a new synagogue and to keep registers of births, marriages and deaths within their community. His cousin Henry Judah was later elected to the Legislative Assembly of the Province of Canada for Champlain.

=== Death ===
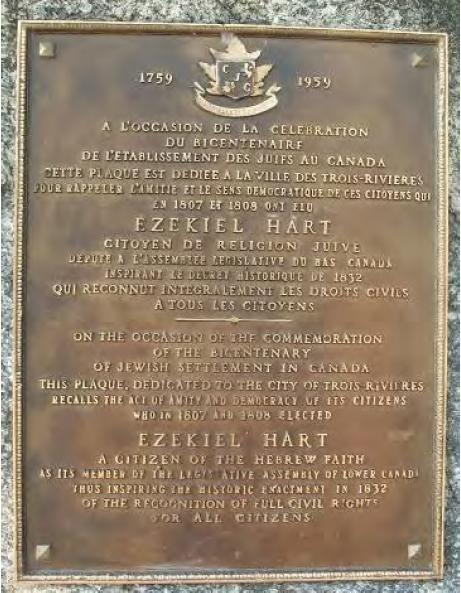
Commemorative plaque in Trois-Rivières

Ezekiel Hart died on 16 September 1843 at Trois-Rivières, at the age of 73. A prominent member of the community, he was accorded an impressive funeral in which all the stores in Trois-Rivières closed, and the 81st Foot paid him final honours. He was buried in the second Jewish cemetery in Trois-Rivières.

Hart had dictated his last will on 20 June 1839. At the time of his death, he lived in an enormous well-furnished house with 16 rooms. He was survived by his ten children: Samuel Becancour, Harriet, Aaron Ezekiel, Esther Elizabeth, Miriam, Carolina Athalia, Henry, Julia, Abraham Kitzinger, and Adolphus Mordecai.

In October 1909, the remains of Ezekiel Hart and others buried in the Jewish cemetery on Prison Street in Trois-Rivières were moved to Montreal's Mount Royal Cemetery of the Congregation of Spanish and Portuguese Jews.

== Legacy and honours ==
- The Hart family papers held by the American Jewish Historical Society Archives in Waltham, Massachusetts, and at the McCord Museum in Montreal, Quebec. The Château Ramezay owns an oil portrait of him.
- The Member from Trois-Rivières, a one-act play about the life of Ezekiel Hart, was written in 1959 by Maxwell Charles Cohen.
- A Heritage Minute mentioning the Hart Affair was filmed and broadcast in the 1990s.
- In 2002, a commemorative plaque was erected to Ezekiel Hart by the Historic Sites and Monuments Board of Canada. A plaque was commemorated to him at the Patrimoine de Trois-Rivières.
- A street in Trois-Rivières was named for him (Rue Hart).

== See also ==
- Antisemitism in Canada
- History of the Jews in Canada
- Electoral firsts in Canada
- Legislative Assembly of Lower Canada
- Timeline of Quebec history (1791 to 1840)

Political offices
Preceded by John Lees, Tory; Louis-Charles Foucher, Tory	MLA, District of Trois-Rivières; 1807–1809; With: Louis-Charles Foucher, Tory; Joseph Badeaux, Tory	Succeeded by Mathew Bell, Tory; Joseph Badeaux, Tory
