= Edward Barnard =

Edward Barnard may refer to:

- Edward Barnard (provost) (1717–1781), provost of Eton
- Edward Emerson Barnard (1857–1923), American astronomer
- Edward Barnard (politician) (c. 1806–1885), Canadian politician
- Edward George Barnard (1778–1851), British Liberal Party politician, Member of Parliament for Greenwich 1832–1851
- Edward William Barnard (1791–1828), British scholar
- Edward Chester Barnard (1863–1921), American topographer

== See also ==
- Édouard-André Barnard (1835–1898), Lower Canada born militia officer
