= René-Joseph Kimber =

Politician in Lower Canada and the Province of Canada

Member of the Legislative Assembly of Lower Canada for Trois-Rivières
- In office 1832 – 1838 (two elections: 1832, 1834) Serving with: Charles Richard Ogden (1832–1833); Jean Desfossés (1833–1834); Edward Barnard (1834–1838)
- Preceded by: Pierre-Benjamin Dumoulin
- Succeeded by: None; Constitution suspended

Member of the Legislative Assembly of the Province of Canada for Champlain
- In office 1841–1843
- Preceded by: New position
- Succeeded by: Henry Judah

Member of the Legislative Council of the Province of Canada
- In office September 4, 1843 – December 22, 1843

Personal details
- Born: November 26, 1786 Quebec, Old Province of Quebec
- Died: December 22, 1843 (aged 57) Montreal, Province of Canada
- Resting place: Notre-Dame, Montreal
- Party: Lower Canada: Parti Patriote (pre-1837); Province of Canada: Anti-Unionist; Groupe canadien-français (1841 onwards)
- Spouse: Apolline Berthelet (m. 1811)
- Relations: Henry Judah (son-in-law)
- Children: 1 daughter, 1 son
- Education: Collège Saint-Raphaël
- Profession: Physician

Military service
- Allegiance: Britain
- Branch/service: Lower Canada militia
- Years of service: 1812 to 1815
- Rank: Captain
- Unit: 4th Select Embodied Militia Battalion
- Battles/wars: War of 1812

René-Joseph Kimber (November 26, 1786 – December 22, 1843) was a physician and political figure in Lower Canada and Canada East, in the Province of Canada (now Quebec). He represented Trois-Rivières in the Legislative Assembly of Lower Canada, as a member of the Parti patriote, although he opposed the use of force in the Lower Canada Rebellion. After the creation of the Province of Canada, which he opposed, he was the member for the district of Champlain in the Legislative Assembly of the Province of Canada. He was briefly a member of the Legislative Council, prior to his death in 1843.

== Family and personal life ==
Kimber was born in Quebec City in 1786, the son of a merchant, René Kimber, and Marie-Josette Robitaille. His grandfather, Joseph-Antoine Jékimbert, was a gardener from Aix-la-Chapelle who emigrated to the colony of Canada in New France in the early 1750s, as part of a company of French colonial marines. After some ten or fifteen years in Quebec, he changed the spelling of his name to "Kimbert" or "Kimber" to give it a more French sound.

From 1801 to 1806, Kimber studied at the Collège Saint-Raphaël at Montreal, and then in Europe for two years, from 1806 to 1808. He then apprenticed in medicine at Trois-Rivières, where his family had relocated. He qualified to practise medicine in 1811 and set up practice at Trois-Rivières, including as physician to the local Ursuline convent.

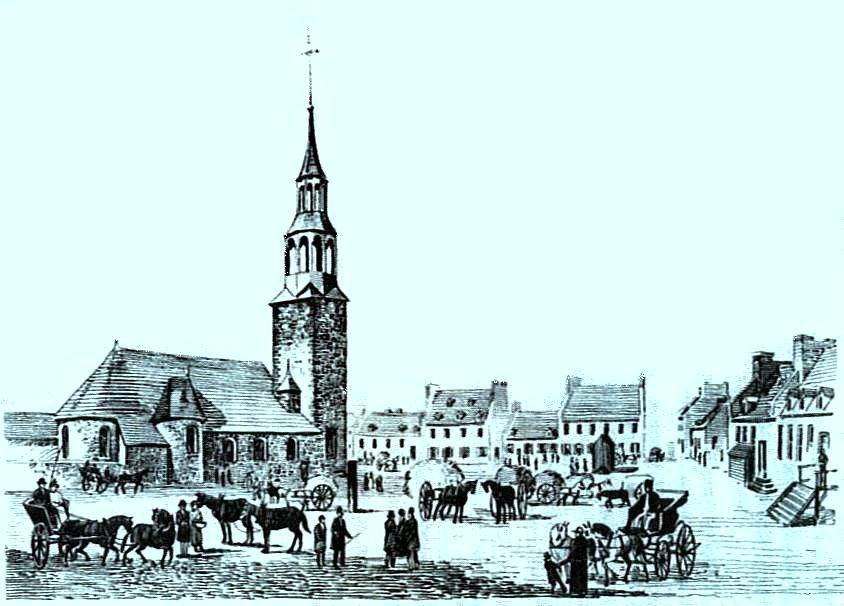
Old Notre-Dame, where Kimber married Apolline Berthelet in 1811, and where he was buried

In 1811, he married Apolline, the daughter of Montreal merchant and entrepreneur, Pierre Berthelet, and Marguerite Viger, at old Notre-Dame in Montreal. The couple had two children: a daughter, Harline, and a son, also named René. They eventually had a large and impressive house, which they used for entertaining.

Kimber served in the militia during the War of 1812 as an officer and surgeon, in the 4th Select Embodied Militia Battalion of Lower Canada. In 1814, he was promoted to captain. After the war, he was a supernumerary officer in the militia battalion commanded by his father. He was eventually appointed a justice of the peace and was involved in creating an educational society at Trois-Rivières.

In 1835, Louis-Joseph Papineau and about a dozen other Patriotes visited Trois-Rivières on a speaking tour to build support for the Patriote movement. In a letter to his wife, Papineau recounted that after the political meeting was done, the Kimbers invited the group to their house for a fine supper, along with local notables such as Ezekiel Hart and Kimber's daughter and son-in-law, Harline and Henry Judah. The house was decorated with transparencies and slogans, such as "Long Live Papineau and Viger" and tributes to liberty and the people, along with fruits and garlands and cardboard cut-outs. The party went on until 3 o'clock in the morning. Kimber, in a mischievous spirit, plied his male guests with considerable amounts of fine wines, port and madeira, to the point that, according to Papineau, in the morning some of them could not recall the events of the night before. Papineau assured his wife that he had limited himself to "a little good Bordeaux", and "came out of it all as fresh and sober as when I came in". He slept from 3:30 am to 5 am, and carried on with the trip to Quebec.

Kimber was a charitable man, known for his donations for those in need. In one case, he bought a house for a former servant and arranged for a regular monthly payment. When he was preparing his will, he set aside the debts which several poor people owed to him.

== Political career ==
=== Lower Canada ===
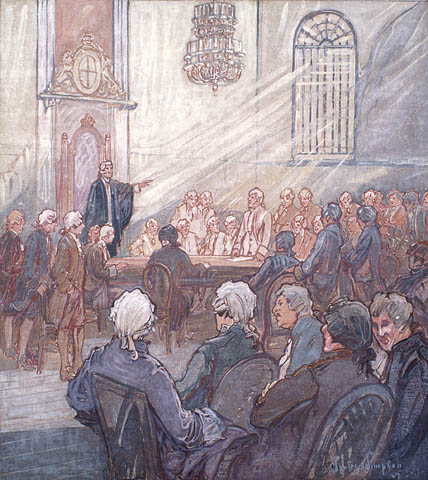
Legislative Assembly of Lower Canada, meeting in the Bishop's Chapel, Quebec

Kimber was elected to the Legislative Assembly of Lower Canada for Trois-Rivières district in a by-election in 1832, and was re-elected in the general election of 1834. He supported the Ninety-Two Resolutions, which Papineau introduced in the Assembly, calling on the British government to make major reforms to the constitutional structure in Lower Canada.

Also in 1834, Kimber was chair of a committee appointed by the Assembly to review the rights of Jews in Lower Canada. Two years earlier, the Parliament had passed a bill for Jewish emancipation, to put Jews on the same footing as Christians. Some questions had arisen about the interpretation of the act, which resulted in a review by the committee chaired by Kimber.

Although recognised as a leader of the Patriotes in the Trois-Rivières area, he did not support the use of force, and remained committed to constitutional solutions, which helped ensure that Trois-Rivières remained relatively peaceful during the Lower Canada Rebellion of 1837–1838. In September 1837, prior to the outbreak of the Rebellion, he chaired a meeting with local notables to discuss the possible approaches to take. He urged prudence, and proposed options for Papineau to consider, but did not consider joining the Rebellion. In December 1837, after the outbreak of the Rebellion, he wrote a letter to Louis-Hippolyte LaFontaine, in which he accused Papineau of treachery in having misled his supporters about his ultimate goals. Kimber correctly predicted that Lower Canada would be put under a provisional government or martial law, and stated that he held to positions of constitutional reform, not revolution.

As a result of the Rebellion, the British government suspended the constitution of Lower Canada, including the Parliament, ending Kimber's position in the Legislative Assembly.

=== Province of Canada ===
Following the rebellion in Lower Canada, and the similar rebellion in 1837 in Upper Canada (now Ontario), the British government decided to merge the two provinces into a single province, as recommended by Lord Durham in the Durham Report. The Union Act, 1840, passed by the British Parliament, abolished the two provinces and their separate parliaments. It created the Province of Canada, with a single Parliament for the entire province, composed of an elected Legislative Assembly and an appointed Legislative Council. The Governor General initially retained a strong position in the government.

Kimber opposed the union of Upper Canada and Lower Canada, but stood for election to the new Legislative Assembly in the first general election, in 1841. He was elected for the Champlain riding. In the first session of the new Parliament, he voted against the union. Kimber generally aligned with the French-Canadian Group, in the sessions of 1841 and 1842.

In September 1843, he was named to the Legislative Council and his seat in the Assembly was vacated automatically. His son-in-law, Henry Judah, won the subsequent by-election to replace him. However, Kimber died only a few months later, in Montreal in December 1843.

== Family and relations ==
After the death of her first husband, Kimber's sister Clotilde married Charles Langevin, who represented Hampshire in the Legislative Assembly of Lower Canada.

His daughter Harline married Henry Judah, who represented Champlain in the Legislative Assembly after Kimber was named to the Legislative Council.

His son René became the Gentleman Usher of the Black Rod of the Legislative Council of the Province of Canada.

His cousin, Timothée Kimber, was also a doctor, practising at the town of Chambly, south of Montreal. Timothée Kimber supported the Patriotes in the Rebellion in 1837 and was imprisoned for half a year afterwards.

In his will, Kimber left his gold watch, chain and seals to his friend, Dr Wolfred Nelson, who had been a leader of the Patriotes and had taken up arms in the Rebellion. At the time of the bequest, Nelson had just recently been permitted to return from exile in Bermuda.

== See also ==
1st Parliament of the Province of Canada
