= Trois-Rivières (Lower Canada electoral district) =

Coordinates: 46.3°N 72.6°W

Lower Canada electoral district

Defunct pre-Confederation electoral district
- Legislature: Legislative Assembly of Lower Canada
- District created: 1792
- District abolished: 1838
- First contested: 1792
- Last contested: 1834

Under the Constitutional Act of 1791, the district of Trois-Rivières was established. Its boundaries roughly covered the pre-merger city of Trois-Rivières.

Trois-Rivières was represented simultaneously by two Members at the Legislative Assembly of Lower Canada.

== Members for Trois-Rivières (1792–1838) ==
Name	Party	Election
John Lees	Tory Party	1792
John Lees	Tory Party	1796
John Lees	Tory Party	1800
John Lees	Tory Party	1804
Ezekiel Hart	Tory Party	1807
Ezekiel Hart	Tory Party	1808
Mathew Bell	Tory Party	1809
Mathew Bell	Tory Party	1810
Charles Richard Ogden	Tory Party	1814
Charles Richard Ogden	Tory Party	1816
Charles Richard Ogden	Tory Party	Spring 1820
Charles Richard Ogden	Tory Party	Summer 1820
Étienne Ranvoyzé	Parti Canadien	1824
Charles Richard Ogden	Tory Party	1826
Charles Richard Ogden	Tory Party	1827
Charles Richard Ogden	Tory Party	1830
Jean Desfossés	Parti Patriote	1833
Edward Barnard	Parti Patriote	1834
Name	Party	Election
Nicolas Saint-Martin	Parti Canadien	1792
Pierre-Amable de Bonne	Tory Party	1796
Pierre-Amable de Bonne	Tory Party	1800
Louis-Charles Foucher	Tory Party	1804
Joseph Badeaux	Tory Party	1808
Joseph Badeaux	Tory Party	1809
Thomas Coffin	Tory Party	1810
Amable Berthelot	Parti Canadien	1814
Pierre Vézina	Tory Party	1816
Marie-Joseph Godefroy de Tonnancour	Parti Canadien	Spring 1820
Joseph Badeaux	Tory Party	Summer 1820
Amable Berthelot	Parti Canadien	1824
Pierre-Benjamin Dumoulin	Parti Canadien	1827
Pierre-Benjamin Dumoulin	Parti Canadien	1830
René-Joseph Kimber	Parti Patriote	1832
René-Joseph Kimber	Parti Patriote	1834

== See also ==
- History of Canada
- History of Quebec
- Mauricie
- Politics of Canada
- Politics of Quebec
- Trois-Rivières
- Trois-Rivières Electoral District (Province of Canada – 1841–1867)
- Trois-Rivières Federal Electoral District (since 1867)
- Trois-Rivières Provincial Electoral District (since 1867)
