= Marcoux =

Marcoux may refer to:

== People with the surname ==
- Valérie Marcoux, Canadian figure skater
- Pierre Marcoux, Sr., political figure in Lower Canada
- Pierre Marcoux, militia officer in Lower Canada
- Yvon Marcoux, Canadian politician
- Sauveur Marcoux, Canadian politician

== Places in France ==
- Marcoux, Alpes-de-Haute-Provence, a commune in the department of Alpes-de-Haute-Provence
- Marcoux, Loire, a commune in the department of Loire

== See also ==
- Marcoux Corner
- Micheline Coulombe Saint-Marcoux
