= Joseph Badeaux =

Lower Canada notary and politician (1777–1835)

Joseph Badeaux (25 September 1777 – 12 September 1835) was the son of Jean-Baptiste Badeaux and, in 1792, he began articling to become a notary. His clerkship was with his brother Antoine-Isidore, who, like their father, was of the notarial profession. He was commissioned to practise in 1798. His practice quickly became successful and Joseph rose to prominence in his home town of Trois-Rivières and also rose through the militia. He was a captain during the War of 1812 and reached the rank of major in 1822.

He was also active in politics and served a number of terms as a member of the Lower Canada House of Assembly starting in 1808.

His second wife, Geneviève, was the daughter of judge Michel-Amable Berthelot Dartigny.

Political offices
Preceded by Louis-Charles Foucher, Tory; Ezekiel Hart, Tory	MLA, District of Trois-Rivières; 1808–1810; With: Ezekiel Hart, Tory; Mathew Bell, Tory	Succeeded by Thomas Coffin, Tory; Mathew Bell, Tory
Preceded by Marie-Joseph Godefroy de Tonnancour, Parti Canadien; Charles Richard Ogden, Tory	MLA, District of Trois-Rivières; 1820–1824; With: Charles Richard Ogden, Tory	Succeeded by Amable Berthelot, Parti Canadien; Étienne Ranvoyzé, Parti Canadien
