= Pierre-Benjamin Dumoulin =

Canadian politician (ca 1799–1856)

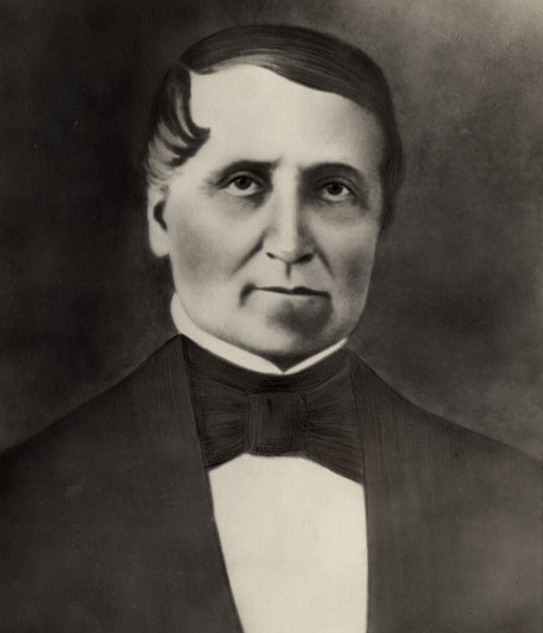
Pierre-Benjamin Dumoulin

Pierre-Benjamin Dumoulin (ca 1799 – September 24, 1856) was a seigneur, lawyer, judge and political figure in Lower Canada and Canada East.

He was probably born in Trois-Rivières, Lower Canada around 1799 and studied at the Séminaire de Nicolet. He articled in law at Trois-Rivières with Pierre Vézina, was admitted to the bar in 1821 and set up practice in Trois-Rivières. He acquired part of the seigneury of Grosbois-Est during the 1820s. In 1826, he ran unsuccessfully in a by-election to represent Saint-Maurice in the Legislative Assembly of Lower Canada; he was elected in 1827 for Trois-Rivières, reelected in 1830 and resigned in 1832. He was named a Queen's Counsel and justice of the peace in 1838. Following a complaint against him by Colonel Bartholomew Conrad Augustus Gugy, he was removed from his appointments in 1843. He served as mayor of Trois-Rivières in 1845 and 1853. In 1846, he sold the seigneury of Grosbois-Est and bought the seigneury of Saint-Maurice. He was elected to the Legislative Assembly of the Province of Canada for Yamaska as a Reformer in 1851. In 1853, he was named bâtonnier for the district. He was reinstated as Queen's Counsel in the same year. He was appointed chief judge in the Court of Quarter Sessions at Trois-Rivières in 1856. He died in Trois-Rivières later that year.

His son Sévère, also a lawyer, also served in the legislative assembly and as mayor of Trois-Rivières.

Political offices
| Preceded by Amable Berthelot, Parti Canadien; Charles Richard Ogden, Tory | MLA, District of Trois-Rivières; 1827–1832; With: Charles Richard Ogden, Tory | Succeeded by René-Joseph Kimber, Patriote; Charles Richard Ogden, Tory |
| Preceded by None | Mayor of Trois-Rivières; 1845-1846 | Succeeded by Antoine Polette |
