= Benjamin Hart (disambiguation) =

Benjamin Hart (born 1977) is an English actor.

Benjamin Hart may also refer to:

- Benjamin Hart (businessman) (1779–1855), Canadian businessman
- Benjamin Hart (cricketer) (born 1977), New Zealand cricketer
- Ben Hart (Australian footballer) (born 1974), Australian rules footballer
- Ben Hart (footballer, born 2000), English footballer
- Ben Hart (magician) (born 1990), British magician
