= Arcand =

Arcand is a surname. Notable people with the surname include:

- Adrien Arcand (1899–1967), Canadian far-right politician
- Denys Arcand (b. 1941), Canadian film director, producer and screenwriter
- Gabriel Arcand (b. 1949), Canadian actor, brother of Denys Arcand
- Jean-Louis Arcand, Canadian economist
- Jean-Olivier Arcand (1793–1875), Canadian political figure
- Nelly Arcan (1973–2009), Canadian novelist
- Paul Arcand (b. 1960), Canadian journalist, radio host and film producer
- Pierre Arcand (b. 1951), Canadian businessman and politician, brother of Paul Arcand
