= Eddie O'Hara =

Edward or Eddie O'Hara may also refer to:

- Edward O'Hara (Canadian politician) (died 1833), Canadian politician
- Eddie O'Hara (footballer, born 1927) (1927–1987), Irish professional footballer
- Eddie O'Hara (footballer, born 1935) (1935–2016), Scottish professional footballer
- Eddie O'Hara (politician) (1937–2016), British politician
