= Saint Hubert Street =

Thoroughfare in Montreal, Canada

Coordinates: 45°30′57″N 73°33′35″W

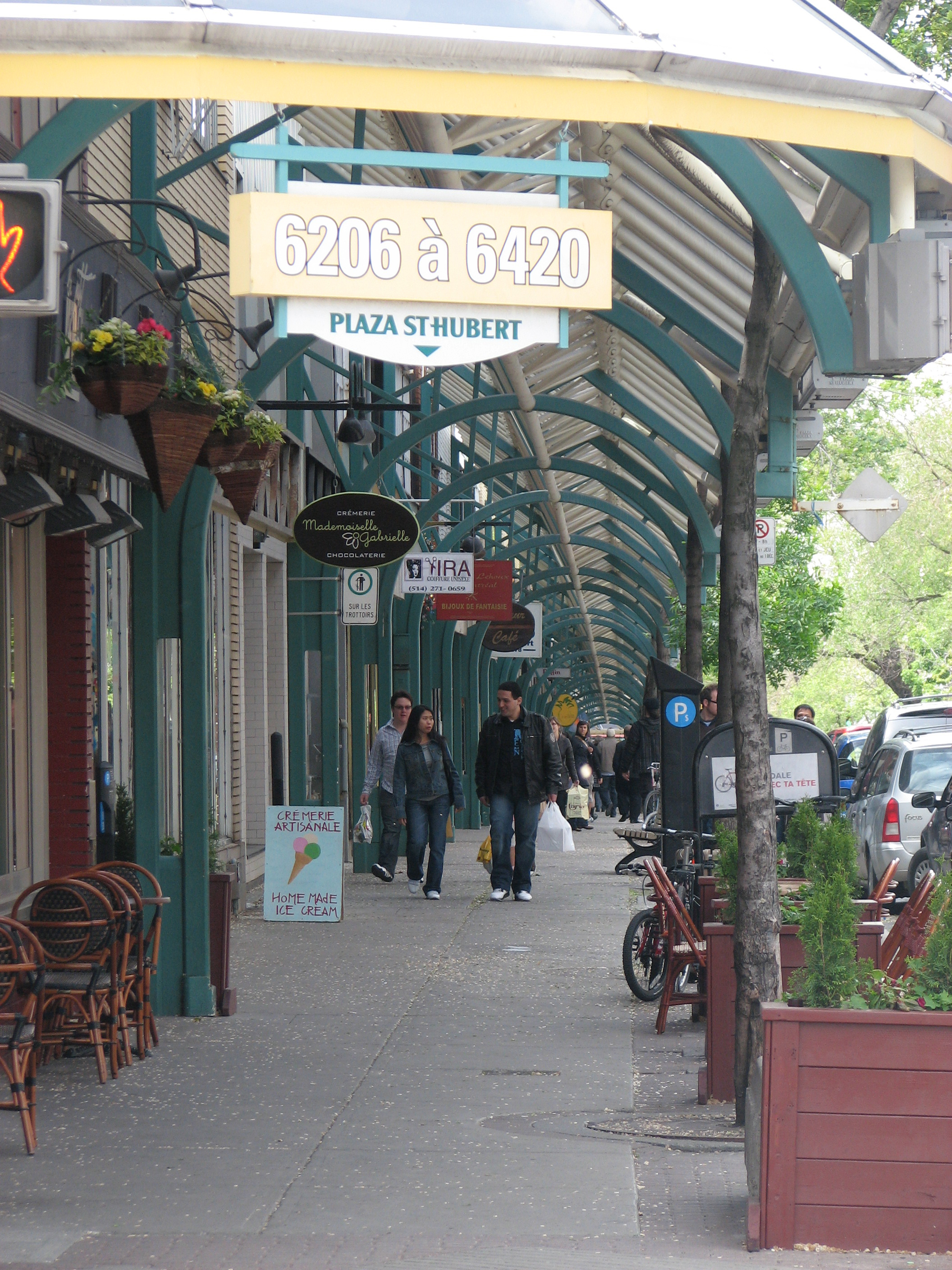
- Interactive map of Saint Hubert Street
- Native name: rue Saint-Hubert (French)
- Location: Montreal, Quebec, Canada
- South end: De la Commune Street East
- Major junctions: A-40 (TCH); R-138; R-136
- North end: Stanley Park Avenue

St. Hubert Street (officially in French: rue Saint-Hubert) is a north–south street that spans the island of Montreal. It is located east of Berri Street.

It traverses the boroughs of Ville-Marie, Le Plateau-Mont-Royal, Rosemont–La Petite-Patrie, Villeray–Saint-Michel–Parc-Extension and Ahuntsic-Cartierville.

There is also a Rue Saint-Hubert in Laval's Pont-Viau district, running several blocks north from the Rivière des Prairies not far from the alignment of the Montreal street, although they are not connected.

== History ==
The land where this street is located was donated by Hubert-Joseph Lacroix (1743–1821), whose family settled on this street, and was officially laid out in 1826. The large residences built here in the second half of the nineteenth century, mainly by the French-Canadian elite, preserve the character of the street's residential origins to this day.

The artery was the site of the Montreal Eucharistic Congress in 1910, which ran between Saint-Antoine Street and Cherrier Street.

The first St-Hubert restaurant was opened on this street in 1951.

Between Bellechasse Street and Jean-Talon Street, the street becomes an outdoor plaza, known as Plaza-St-Hubert, with the sidewalks protected from the elements by a glass roof.
