= Joseph Hart (disambiguation) =

Joseph Hart (1712–1768) was a Calvinist minister and hymnwriter.

Joseph Hart may also refer to:

- Joseph Hart (artist) (born 1976), American artist
- Joseph Hart (entertainer) (1861–1921), American vaudeville performer and songwriter
- Joseph Binns Hart (1794–1844), English organist and composer
- Joseph C. Hart (1798–1855), American writer
- Joseph Hubert Hart (born 1931), American prelate of the Roman Catholic Church
- Joseph Johnson Hart (1859–1916), U.S. Representative from Pennsylvania
- Joe Hart (born 1987), English footballer
- Joe Hart (politician) (1944-2022), American politician, Arizona state mine inspector, and former state representative
- Joe Hart (Glee), a character on the Glee television series

== See also ==
- Joel Hart (disambiguation)
