= De Bonne =

de Bonne is a surname. Notable people with the surname include:

- François de Bonne, Duke of Lesdiguières (1543–1626), French soldier
- Pierre-Amable de Bonne, Lower Canada seigneur, lawyer, judge, and politician
