= Nicolas Saint-Martin =

Canadian politician

Nicolas Saint-Martin (August 10, 1753 – July 12, 1823) was a militia officer and political figure in Lower Canada. He is sometimes also referred to as Nicolas de Saint-Martin or Nicolas Gorge de Saint-Martin.

He was born Jacques-Nicolas Saint-Martin at Trois-Rivières in 1753, the son of a captain in the French navy who took part in the defence of Quebec City. Saint-Martin volunteered to serve in the British Army during the American invasion of 1775–6. He retired on half pay in 1783. In 1784, he married Marie-Louise, the daughter of seigneur Louis-Joseph Godefroy de Tonnancour. He was named justice of the peace for the Trois-Rivières district in 1790 and was also served as commissioner for various public works projects in the region. He was elected to the 1st Parliament of Lower Canada for Trois-Rivières in 1792. Saint-Martin joined the local militia, becoming lieutenant-colonel in 1812, and served during the War of 1812.

In 1823, he died at Yamachiche after suffering an attack of paralysis the preceding year.

Political offices
Preceded by Parliamentary system established in 1792	MLA, District of Trois-Rivières; 1792–1796; With: John Lees, Tory	Succeeded by Pierre-Amable de Bonne, Tory; John Lees, Tory
