= Eleazar David David =

Canadian cavalry officer, lawyer, and civil servant

Eleazar David David (June 8, 1811 – February 1, 1887) was a Canadian cavalry officer, lawyer, and civil servant. He was the son of Samuel David, and grandson of Aaron Hart.
