= Theodore Hart =

Canadian businessman

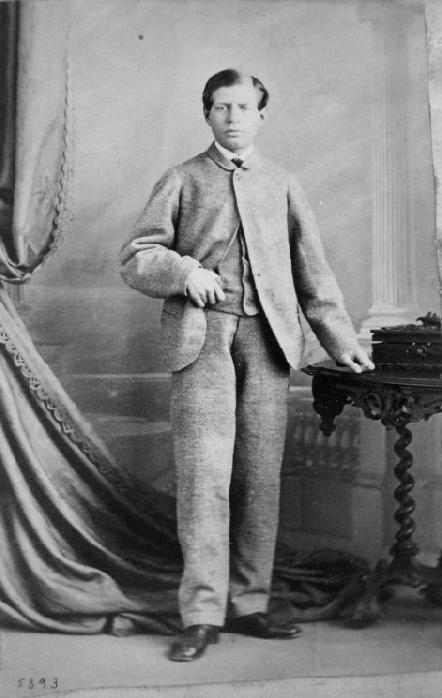
- Born: Theodore Jonathan Hart; May 7, 1816; Montreal, Quebec
- Died: May 28, 1887 (aged 71); Mézières, France
- Spouse(s): Frances Michael David (1842-1844); Mary Kent Bradbury (1845-death)

Theodore Jonathan Hart (May 7, 1816 - May 28, 1887) was a Canadian businessman from Montreal, Lower Canada. He was the son of Benjamin Hart and grandson of Aaron Hart. Hart was involved in various business interests in Montreal and trade to Britain.

Hart became a Unitarian after his second marriage. Retired due to health concerns, Hart died in France.
