= Aaron Hart =

Aaron Hart may refer to:

- Aaron Hart (businessman) (1724–1800), businessman in Lower Canada
- Aaron Hart (rabbi) (1670–1756), chief rabbi of the UK
