= Louis-Charles Foucher =

Canadian politician

Lt-Colonel The Hon. Louis-Charles Foucher (September 13, 1760 – December 26, 1829) was Solicitor General for Lower Canada and elected to the 2nd Parliament of Lower Canada for Montreal West, and afterwards for York and Trois-Rivières. His final position held was Judge of the Court of King's Bench at Montreal. His home from 1820, Piedmont, was one of the early estates of the Golden Square Mile.

== Background ==
Born 1760, at Rivière-des-Prairies, Quebec, he was the son of Antoine Foucher (1717-1801) and his first wife Marie-Joachim Chénier (1723-1786), daughter of Jean-Baptiste Chénier (1684-1760), of Lachine, Quebec. Antoine Foucher's father had come to New France as a young man but had returned to his native Bourges in France, where Louis-Charles' father was born, before he too came to Montreal in 1739. Originally a baker, Antoine Foucher had a successful career as a notary at Terrebonne, but he is best remembered as the owner of the first Francophone theatre (staging in 1774 the first production of Molière with various English officers at his home in Montreal) to which he dedicated his small fortune. Louis-Charles' mother's family had been settled in New France since at least 1651.

== Career ==
From 1773 to 1780, Louis-Charles Foucher studied at the Collège Saint-Raphaël. From 1780, he was part of Fleury Mesplet's Enlightenment Circle. Foucher qualified to practice as a notary in 1784 and was admitted to the Bar of Montreal in 1789, setting up his own legal practice with Joseph Bédard. Just six years later in 1795, Foucher was named Solicitor General for Lower Canada. The following year, in 1796, he was elected to the 2nd Parliament of Lower Canada in the Legislative Assembly of Lower Canada for Montreal West; he had also run unsuccessfully for Effingham County. In 1800, he was defeated again in Effingham but elected in York County. He was elected in Trois-Rivières in 1804. In 1803, Foucher was appointed Puisne judge in the provincial court for Trois-Rivières district and, in 1812, he was named to the Court of King's Bench at Montreal.

Unusually for a Francophone, politically Foucher was a Tory. In 1817, the Legislative Assembly of Lower Canada, led by the Parti patriote, brought charges against him for misdemeanor and delinquency in the exercise of his functions, and demanded his dismissal. The matter was referred to the Prince Regent, who in 1819 decided in his favour, and as such he kept his judicial seat.

== Private life and family ==
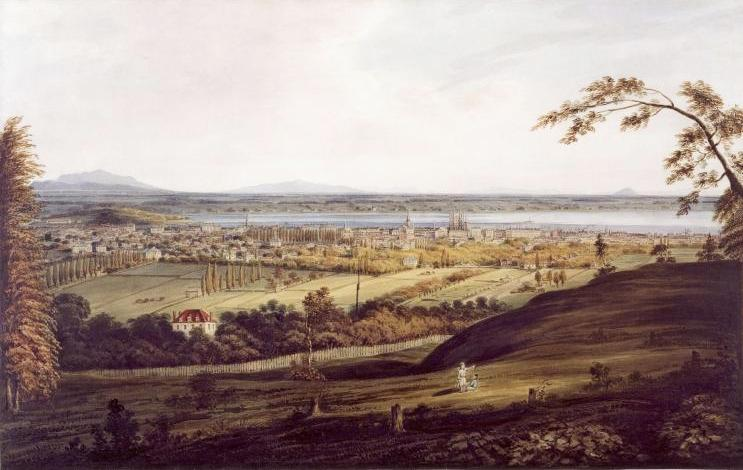
Montreal, 1832: The large red-roofed house in the foreground is Piedmont, Foucher's home from 1820 to 1829

During the War of 1812, Foucher served as a Lieutenant-Colonel in the militia. In 1820, he moved into Piedmont, one of the early estates of the Golden Square Mile, which after his death was sold to John Frothingham.

In 1787, he had married Marie-Élizabeth, daughter of Pierre Foretier, Seigneur d'Île Bizard. Madame Foucher's sister was married to The Hon. Denis-Benjamin Viger, Joint Prime Minister of the Canadas. Foucher died at Montreal in 1829. His daughter Marie-Léocadie married her first cousin The Hon. Hugues Heney, who had inherited their grandfather's Seigneury at Île Bizard.

Political offices
Preceded by Pierre-Amable de Bonne, Tory; John Lees, Tory	MLA, District of Trois-Rivières; 1804–1808; With: John Lees, Tory; Ezekiel Hart, Tory	Succeeded by Joseph Badeaux, Tory; Ezekiel Hart, Tory
