= Robert Lester =

Robert Lester may refer to:

- Robert Lester (American football) (born 1988), American football safety
- Robert Lester (politician) (1751–1830), businessman and political figure in Lower Canada
- Robert "Squirrel" Lester (1942–2010), tenor in The Chi-Lites
