= Joel Hart =

Joel Hart may refer to:

- Joel Hart (doctor) (1784–1842), American physician and diplomat
- Joel Tanner Hart (1810–1877), American sculptor
