= Charles Richard Ogden =

Lawyer and politician in Lower Canada

Charles Richard Ogden QC
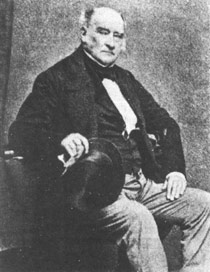

Joint Premier of the Province of Canada for Canada East
- In office 1841–1842

Member of the Legislative Assembly of Lower Canada for Trois-Rivières (six elections; for details, see succession boxes at end of article)
- In office 1814–1824; 1826–1833

Solicitor General for Lower Canada
- In office 1824–1833

Attorney General for Lower Canada
- In office 1833–1842
- Preceded by: James Stuart
- Succeeded by: Louis-Hippolyte LaFontaine

Special Council of Lower Canada
- In office 1840–1841

Member of the Legislative Assembly of the Province of Canada for Three Rivers
- In office 1841–1844
- Preceded by: New position
- Succeeded by: Edward Greive

Personal details
- Born: February 6, 1791 Quebec, Old Province of Quebec
- Died: February 19, 1866 (aged 75) Edge Hill, England
- Party: Lower Canada: Parti bureaucrates Province of Canada: "British" Tory
- Spouses: (1) Mary Aston Coffin (1824; her death); (2) Susan Clarke (1829)
- Relations: Peter Skene Ogden (brother)
- Children: (1) 2 children with Mary (both died young); (2) 4 sons, 1 daughter with Susan
- Profession: Lawyer

Military service
- Allegiance: Britain
- Branch/service: Lower Canada militia
- Years of service: 1812 to 1814
- Rank: Lieutenant
- Unit: 1st / 8th Battalions, Trois-Rivières Militia
- Battles/wars: War of 1812

Charles Richard Ogden, QC (February 6, 1791 – February 19, 1866) was a Joint Premier of the Province of Canada for Canada East from 1841 to 1842 with William Henry Draper PM for Canada West. Odgen was a member of the Château Clique, the group of English-speaking officials who supported the Governor General, appointed by the British government. Trained as a lawyer, he developed a lucrative practice at Trois-Rivières and then Montreal. He had a lengthy career as a member of the Legislative Assembly of Lower Canada.

During the Lower Canada Rebellions of 1837 and 1838, Ogden assisted the Governor General in proclaiming martial law in Montreal. He was the lead Crown prosecutor for those caught in arms during the Rebellions. Twelve were hanged.

Following the Rebellions, Ogden assisted in the implementation of the union of Lower Canada with Upper Canada. Although he was elected to the Legislative Assembly of the Province of Canada, his standing with his French-Canadian constituents had been damaged by his actions in the Rebellions and the union.

In 1841, Ogden was initially a member of the Executive Council of the Province of Canada, the province's Cabinet, but was forced out in 1842 to make way for French-Canadians. His position as Attorney General of Lower Canada was taken by Louis-Hippolyte LaFontaine, one of the leaders of the reform movement. Ogden then moved to England. He was appointed Attorney General for the Isle of Man, and later to an additional post as Registrar of the Probate Court of Liverpool. He died in England in 1866.

== Family and early life ==
Ogden was born in Quebec City in 1791, in the old Province of Quebec. He was one of eleven sons of Isaac Ogden, a loyalist and puisne judge of the Court of King's Bench at Montreal, and Sarah Hanson. One of Ogden's brothers, Peter Skene Ogden, became an explorer and fur trader who worked for the North West Company and the Hudson's Bay Company.

Ogden was educated at private schools, first at Trois-Rivières and later at Montreal. He was called to the bar of Lower Canada in 1812 and set up his practice at Trois-Rivières. He eventually relocated to Montreal, where he established a lucrative practice.

During the War of 1812, Ogden served an uneventful period as a lieutenant in the Lower Canada militia at Trois-Rivières.

Ogden was married twice. His first wife was Mary Aston Coffin, daughter of General John Coffin of New Brunswick. The couple married in England in 1824 and had two children, who both died in infancy. After Mary's death, Ogden remarried in 1829, with Susan Clarke of Montreal. They had four sons and one daughter.

== Lower Canada political career ==
As a member of a prominent family in Lower Canada and a talented lawyer, Ogden advanced quickly in his profession and in politics. He was first elected to the Legislative Assembly of Lower Canada for Trois-Rivières in 1814 and was its representative until he was defeated in the general election of 1824, while he was in England. He was re-elected in a by-election in 1826 and held the seat until 1833.

He was appointed King's Counsel in 1816 and attorney general for the Trois-Rivières district in 1818. In 1824, on the recommendation of Governor General Lord Ramsey, he was appointed solicitor general for Lower Canada in 1824. In 1833, he was named attorney general for Lower Canada. Under a policy of the British Colonial Office, he resigned his seat in the Legislative Assembly on his appointment as attorney general.

As a member of the Château Clique and the Parti bureaucratic, Ogden was a strong supporter of the Governor General. In 1822, he was involved in drawing up a list of political charges against Judge Pierre-Stanislas Bédard, in retaliation for political attacks by the Parti canadien against judges who were sympathetic to the government.

Even though the population of Trois-Rivières was largely French-Canadian, and Ogden was a member of the British Tory group, he was generally popular with his constituents. He held the seat through his strong personality and firm grasp of local patronage. In the general elections of 1827, he was one of the few government supporters to retain his seat in the French-Canadian areas of the province. A complicated man, Ogden was known to be very popular among his constituents for his fluent French, his oratory and his sense of humour. He was notorious for his practical jokes, one of which was to paint moustaches on the sleeping passengers of a ship travelling from Montreal to Quebec City.

== Lower Canada Rebellion ==
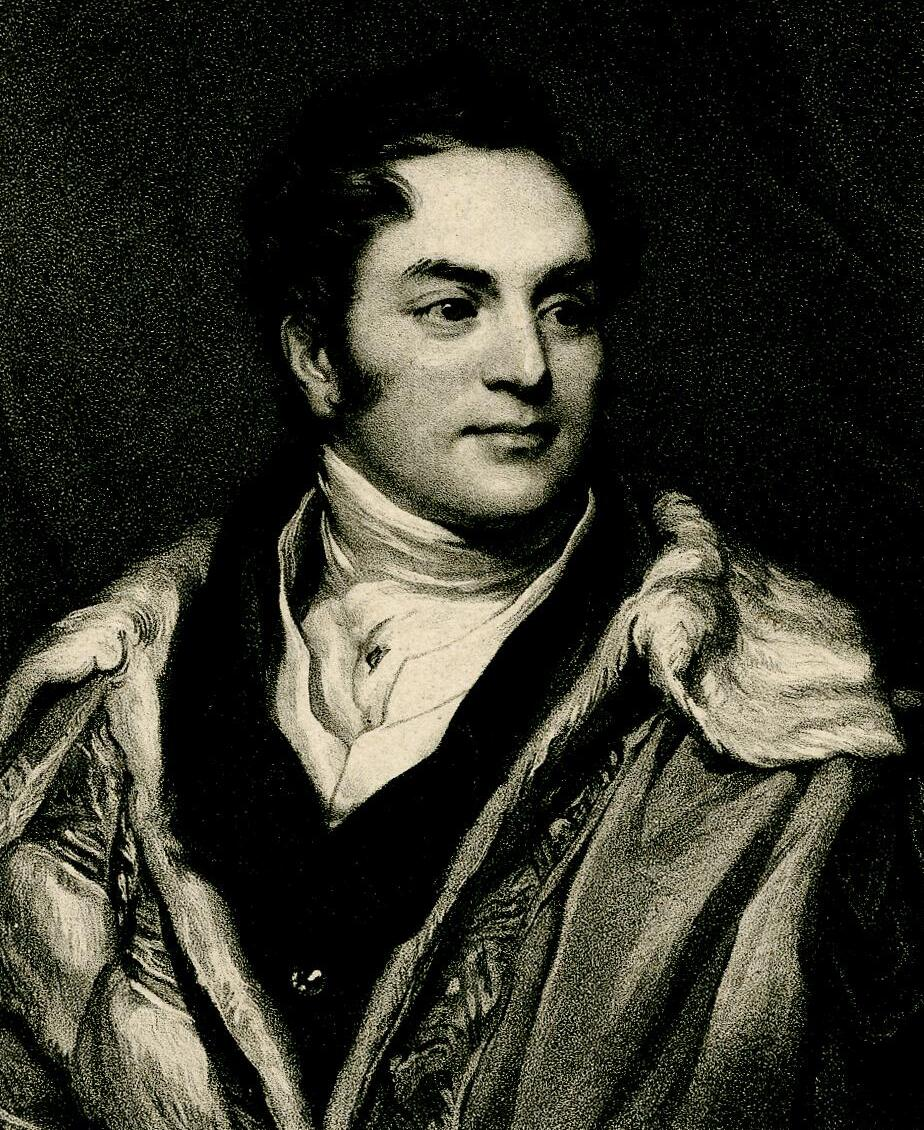
Governor General Lord Gosford, who relied on Ogden's legal advice when he imposed martial law on Montreal

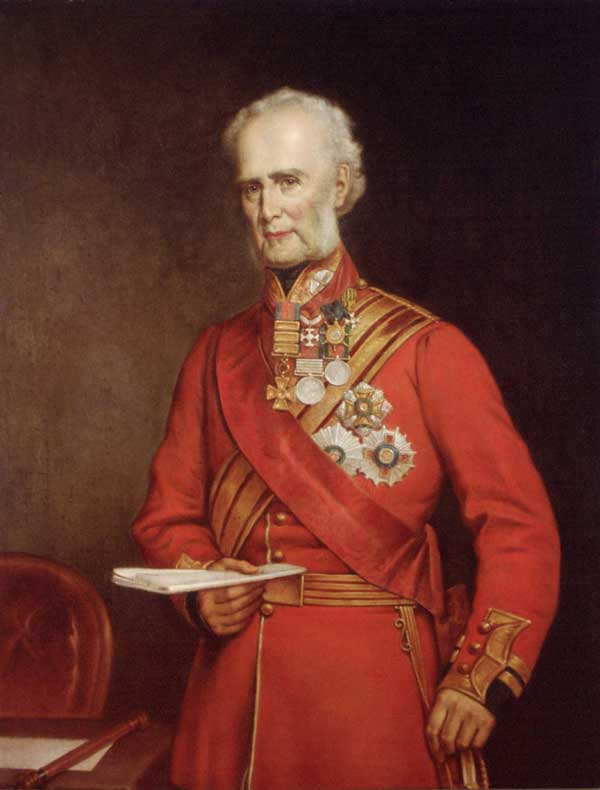
General Sir John Colborne, who led the military suppression of the Rebellion

In October 1837, the Patriotes held a major rally, the Assembly of the Six Counties. Ogden warned Governor General Gosford that the Assembly was "... the first public and open declaration of an intention to revolt". In November 1837, as the unrest grew which would culminate in the Lower Canada Rebellion, Ogden, along with Solicitor General Michael O'Sullivan, wrote a legal opinion for Lord Gosford, advising him that he had the power to declare martial law in the event of a rebellion. Gosford relied on that opinion when he declared martial law in the district of Montreal on December 5, 1837.

After Gosford was recalled to Britain in February 1838, he was replaced by General Sir John Colborne, who had led the military suppression of the Rebellion in 1837. When the Rebellion broke out again in the fall of 1838, Colborne ordered the arrest and prosecution of Patriote leaders. As Attorney-General and a leading Tory, Ogden was chief Crown prosecutor of the Patriotes who had been involved in the rebellion. Twelve were hanged.

In 1838, the British government passed a statute suspending the constitution of Lower Canada. Instead, the colony was governed by the Governor General, assisted by the Special Council of Lower Canada, appointed by the Governor General. Ogden was appointed to the Special Council in 1840, staying in office until the Act of Union, 1840 came into force in February 1841.

== Province of Canada ==
Following the rebellion in Lower Canada, and the similar rebellion in 1837 in Upper Canada (now Ontario), the British government decided to merge the two provinces into a single province, as recommended by Lord Durham in the Durham Report. The Union Act, 1840, passed by the British Parliament, abolished the two provinces and their separate parliaments. It created the Province of Canada, with a single Parliament for the entire province, composed of an elected Legislative Assembly and an appointed Legislative Council. The Governor General initially retained a strong position in the government.

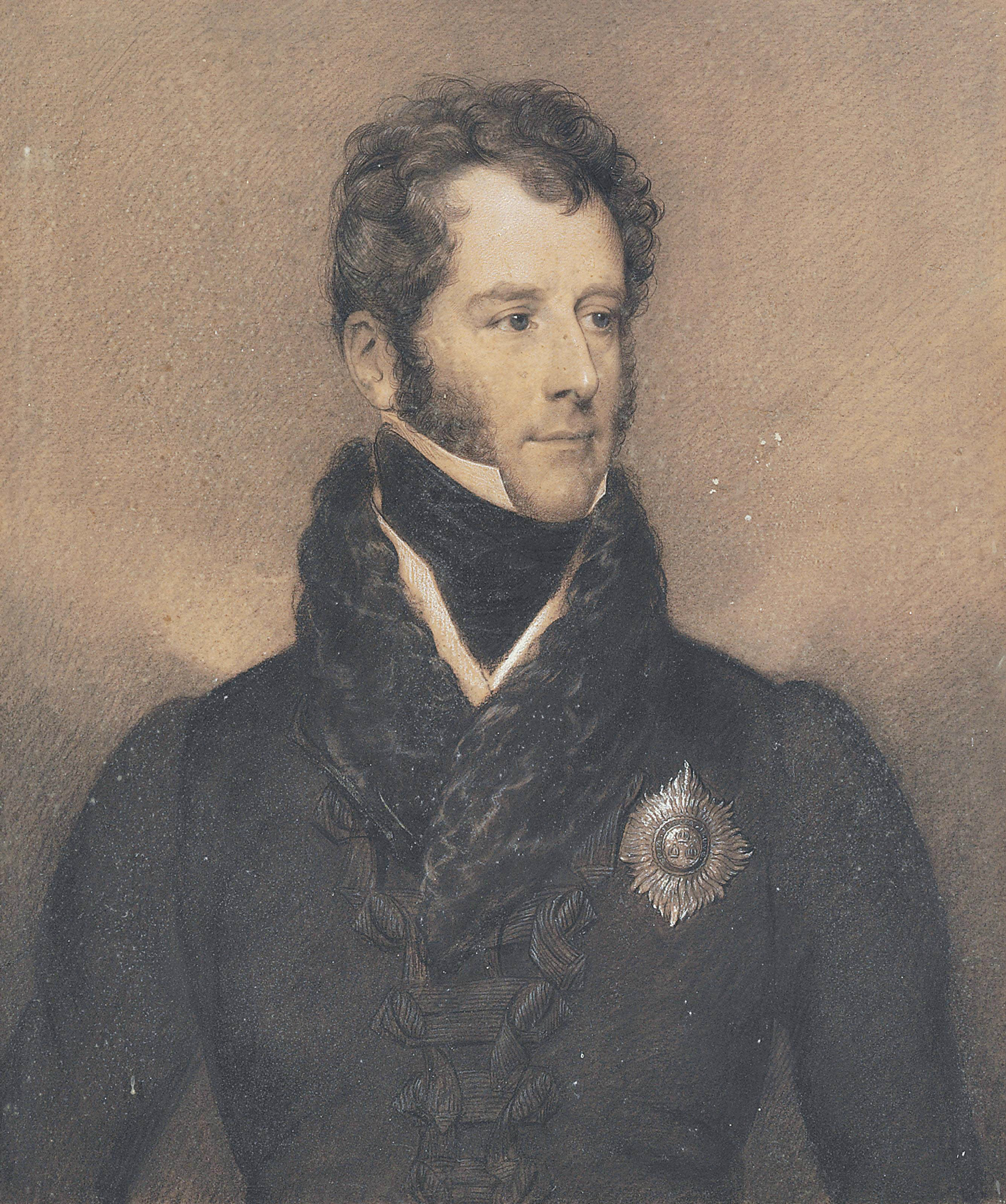
Governor General Sir Charles Bagot, who removed Ogden from the Executive Council

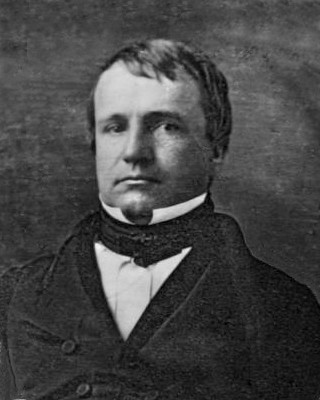
Louis-Hippolyte LaFontaine, who replaced Ogden as the first French-Canadian Attorney General of Lower Canada

As the Attorney General of Lower Canada, Ogden was one of the officials who counter-signed the Governor General's proclamation bringing the Union Act into force. Ogden's leadership in supporting the Union Act reduced his political popularity. Combined with his involvement in prosecuting the Patriotes, his reputation and standing among the French-Canadian population was greatly diminished.

Upon the proclamation of the Union Act, the Governor General, Lord Sydenham, appointed the new Executive Council (the province's Cabinet) in February 1841. It was composed entirely of English-speaking Canadians, even though French-Canadians made up the majority of the population of Lower Canada. Sydenham continued Ogden as Attorney General for Lower Canada, and appointed Ogden to the Council. At the general elections for the new Legislative Assembly, held in the spring of 1841, Ogden stood for election in the new Three Rivers electoral district. He campaigned in favour of the union and was elected, defeating Joseph-Édouard Turcotte, who had been a strong Patriote in the period leading the Rebellion and now opposed the union, as well as a third candidate, Alex T. Hart. Although elected, Ogden was upset that the seat of government had moved to Kingston, taking him away from his lucrative Montreal law practice. He also resented his drastic salary cut in the new government, from £4,000 to £1,500.

In the first session, the major issue was the union. One of the leaders of the French-Canadian Group introduced a motion condemning the way union had been imposed on Lower Canada. Ogden voted against the motion and in favour of the union. For the rest of the first session, he was a consistent supporter of Governor General Sydenham. At the close of the session, Ogden went on a lengthy trip to England.

On his return in 1842, Ogden discovered that there had been a major political development. The reformers, led by Louis-Hippolyte LaFontaine and Robert Baldwin, had put considerable pressure on the new Governor General, Sir Charles Bagot, to admit French-Canadian members to the Executive Council. Bagot had been forced to concede this point. Ogden was dropped from the Council, replaced by LaFontaine as Attorney General for Lower Canada. Ogden protested his loss of the office of Attorney General. He argued that he had been appointed "during good behaviour", not "at pleasure", and could not simply be dismissed for political reasons. His protest was not accepted, as the Attorney General was now a political position, under the developing principles of responsible government. Ogden was also denied a pension for his past services. In response, Ogden began to plan to relocate to England. He was absent for the legislative session in 1843.

Historian Donald Creighton commented that it was a curious fact that the members of the pre-Rebellion generation of Canadian public men "whether they were comparatively young, or middle-aged, or old, failed, with astonishing uniformity, to survive very long in the new political atmosphere [of responsible government]. For them, the adjustment was too difficult..."

== Move to England ==
After he lost the position of Attorney General of Lower Canada in 1842, Ogden went back to England. He may have been pleading his case for compensation to the Lord Chancellor, Lord Lyndhurst, who was a relative of his wife. In 1844, he became a member of the English bar at Lincoln's Inn and was appointed Attorney General for the Isle of Man. He then returned briefly to Canada to settle his affairs, before moving permanently to England in 1844. In 1857 he was also appointed Liverpool Registrar of the new Court of Probate. He held the two positions for the rest of his life.

Ogden died at Edge Hill, near Liverpool, in 1866.

== See also ==
- 1st Parliament of the Province of Canada

Political offices
Preceded by Mathew Bell, Tory; Thomas Coffin, Tory	MLA, District of Trois-Rivières; 1814–1824; With: Amable Berthelot, Parti Canadien; Pierre Vézina, Tory; Marie-Joseph Godefroy de Tonnancour, Parti Canadien; Joseph Badeaux, Tory	Succeeded by Étienne Ranvoyzé, Parti Canadien; Amable Berthelot, Parti Canadien
Preceded by Étienne Ranvoyzé, Parti Canadien; Amable Berthelot, Parti Canadien	MLA, District of Trois-Rivières; 1826–1833; With: Amable Berthelot, Parti Canadien; Pierre-Benjamin Dumoulin, Parti Canadien; René-Joseph Kimber, Parti Canadien	Succeeded by Jean Desfossés, Parti Canadien; René-Joseph Kimber, Parti Canadien
