= Adolphus Hart =

Canadian lawyer and author

Adolphus Mordecai Hart
- Born: April 11, 1814; Trois-Rivières, Lower Canada
- Died: March 23, 1879 (aged 64); Montreal, Quebec, Canada
- Father: Ezekiel Hart

Adolphus Mordecai Hart (April 11, 1814 – March 23, 1879) was a Canadian lawyer and author, the son of Ezekiel Hart.

== Publications ==
- History of the Discovery of the Valley of the Mississippi (2nd ed.). Cincinnati: A. M. Hart. 1852.
- Uncle Tom in Paris: Or, Views of Slavery Outside the Cabin. Baltimore: William Taylor & Company. 1854.
- Practical Suggestions on Mining Rights and Privileges in Canada. Montreal: John Lovell. 1867.
- The Political State and Condition of Her Majesty's Protestant Subjects in the Province of Quebec. CIHM/ICMH Microfiche. Toronto: Canadian News and Publishing Co. 1871. ISBN 9780665089619.
