= Kamouraska (Province of Canada electoral district) =

Electoral district in former Province of Canada

Province of Canada electoral district
- Coordinates: 47.5658°N 69.8658°W

Defunct pre-Confederation electoral district
- Legislature: Legislative Assembly of the Province of Canada
- District created: 1841
- District abolished: 1867
- First contested: 1841
- Last contested: 1863

Kamouraska was an electoral district of the Legislative Assembly of the Parliament of the Province of Canada, in Canada East, in a rural area in the Gaspé region. It was created in 1841 and was based on the previous electoral district of the same name for the Legislative Assembly of Lower Canada. It was represented by one member in the Legislative Assembly.

The electoral district was abolished in 1867, upon the creation of Canada and the province of Quebec.

== Boundaries ==
The Union Act, 1840 merged the two provinces of Upper Canada and Lower Canada into the Province of Canada, with a single Parliament. The separate parliaments of Lower Canada and Upper Canada were abolished.

The Union Act provided that the pre-existing electoral boundaries of Lower Canada and Upper Canada would continue to be used in the new Parliament, unless altered by the Union Act itself. The Kamouraska electoral district of Lower Canada was not altered by the Act, and therefore continued with the same boundaries which had been set by a statute of Lower Canada in 1829:

The County of Kamouraska shall be bounded on the north east by the County of Rimouski, on the south west by the north east boundary line of the Seigniory of Saint Roch des Aulnets, prolonged to the southern boundary of the Province, on the north west by the said River Saint Lawrence, together with the Islands in the said River Saint Lawrence, nearest to the said County, and in whole or in part, fronting the same, and on the south east by the southern boundary of the Province; which County so bounded, comprises the Seigniories of Terrebois, Granville and Lachenaye, l'Islet du Portage, Granville, Kamouraska, Saint Denis, Rivière Ouelle and its augmentation, and Sainte Anne, and the Townships of Bungay, Woodbridge and Ixworth.

The electoral district of Kamouraska was in the historic Beauce region, on the south shore of the Saint Lawrence (now the Kamouraska Regional County Municipality and the Chaudière-Appalaches administrative region). The elections were held in the town of Kamouraska.

== Members of the Legislative Assembly ==
Kamouraska was a single-member constituency.

The following were the members of the Legislative Assembly from Kamouraska. "Party" was a fluid concept, especially during the early years of the Province of Canada. Party affiliations are based on the biographies of individual members given by the National Assembly of Quebec, as well as votes in the Legislative Assembly.

Parliament	Member	Years in Office	Party
1st Parliament; 1841–1844	Amable Berthelot	1841–1847	Anti-unionist; French-Canadian Group
2nd Parliament; 1844–1848	Amable Berthelot	1841–1847	French-Canadian Group
3rd Parliament; 1848–1851	1848–1851	Pierre Canac, dit Marquis	French-Canadian Group, then Ministerialist

== Abolition ==
The district was abolished on July 1, 1867, when the British North America Act, 1867 came into force, splitting the Province of Canada into Quebec and Ontario. It was succeeded by electoral districts of the same name in the House of Commons of Canada and the Legislative Assembly of Quebec.
