= Thomas Walker (Canadian politician) =

Canadian politician (ca 1759–1812)

Thomas Walker (ca 1759 – January 1812) was a lawyer and political figure in Lower Canada.

He served as clerk in the Court of Common Pleas for Montreal District in 1779. Walker was named to the bar the following year. In 1783, he was employed at Quebec City to recover merchandise and funds in the bankruptcy of a firm there. In 1787, he returned to private practice in Montreal. He was elected to the Legislative Assembly of Lower Canada for Montreal County in 1800.

He died at William-Henry (later Sorel) in 1812.

His brother James was a judge and represented Montreal County in the legislative assembly from 1792 to 1796.
