= Louis Guillet =

Canadian politician

Louis Guillet (January 28, 1788 – October 28, 1868) was a Quebec notary and political figure.

Guillet was born in Sainte-Geneviève-de-Batiscan in 1788, apprenticed as a notary at Pointe-aux-Trembles, and was admitted to the profession in 1809. He was named a justice of the peace in 1830. Guillet opposed the creation of registry offices in Lower Canada for the preservation of documents related to real estate ownership and, instead, suggested that notaries hold these documents in trust. He was elected to the Legislative Assembly of the Province of Canada for Champlain in 1844 as a Reformer and was reelected in 1848. Guillet retired from his practice as notary in 1863 and died in Sainte-Geneviève-de-Batiscan in 1868.

Guillet's sister Marie married Alexis Rivard, who was also a member of the legislative assembly, and his brother Valère represented Saint-Maurice in the legislative assembly.

Political offices
Preceded by Henry Judah, Radical Reformer	MLA, District of Champlain; 1844–1851	Succeeded by Thomas Marchildon, Radical Reformer
