= Henry Judah =

Canadian lawyer and politician

Henry Judah QC

Member of the Legislative Assembly of the Province of Canada for Champlain
- In office 1843–1844 (by-election)
- Preceded by: René-Joseph Kimber
- Succeeded by: Louis Guillet

Personal details
- Born: April 28, 1808 London, England
- Died: February 10, 1883 (aged 74) Montreal, Quebec
- Party: French-Canadian Group
- Spouse: Harline Kimber
- Relations: René-Joseph Kimber (father-in-law); Ezekiel Hart (cousin)
- Profession: Lawyer

Henry Hague Judah, QC (April 28, 1808 – February 10, 1883), was a lawyer, businessman, and political figure in Canada East, Province of Canada (now Quebec). Judah was one of the first Jews to become a lawyer in early Canada, and the first Jewish member of the Parliament of the Province of Canada. He had an extensive legal practice, starting in Trois-Rivières, and later in Montreal. He was a member of the commission which implemented the abolition of seigneurial tenure in Lower Canada. He also was involved in banking, eventually becoming the president of the Montreal City and District Savings Bank (now the Laurentian Bank of Canada), and was a promoter of the short-lived Montreal and Bytown Railway Company.

== Family and early life ==
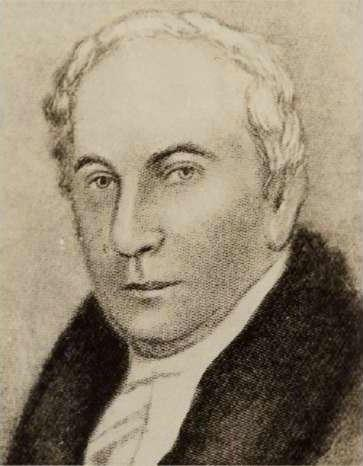
Ezekiel Hart, Judah's cousin and first Jew elected to public office in the British Empire

Judah was born in London in 1808. He was the cousin of Ezekiel Hart, considered the first Jew elected to public office in the British Empire. Ezekiel Hart's son, Aaron Ezekiel Hart, was the first Jew called to the bar in Lower Canada, in 1824. The Harts were well-established in the Trois-Rivières area, and Judah joined them there. He studied law at Trois-Rivières and was called to the bar in 1829, one of the first Jews called to the bar in the Canadas. He set up practice at Trois-Rivières. In 1840, Judah moved his law practice to Montreal, where he entered into partnership with Jonathan S.C. Würtele.

In 1834, Judah married Harline Kimber, the daughter of René-Joseph Kimber, a doctor in Trois-Rivières. The marriage occurred in the Anglican church.

== Political career ==
In the 1830s, Judah's father-in-law, René-Joseph Kimber, was a member of the Legislative Assembly of Lower Canada, as a supporter of the Parti canadien. Following the union of Lower Canada and Upper Canada in 1841, Kimber was elected to the first Legislative Assembly of the Province of Canada in 1841 for the riding of Champlain.

In 1843, Kimber was appointed to the Legislative Council, the upper house of the Parliament of the Province of Canada. Judah stood for election to the vacant Champlain riding in the by-election and was elected, succeeding to the position previously held by his father-in-law.

Unlike his cousin Ezekiel Hart, who had been twice elected to the Assembly of Lower Canada but was refused admittance because he was Jewish, Judah did not have any difficulty in taking his seat. Some twenty years after Hart had been denied his seat, the provincial Parliament had passed Jewish emancipation legislation to give Jews equal legal rights with other British subjects. It is not clear if Judah was able to sit because of this provision, or if he had converted following his marriage to his wife, but in any event he sat during the legislative session of 1843.

Judah took an active part in the Assembly, participating in the votes on several major issues. He generally voted with the French-Canadian Group, a reform group led by Louis-Hippolyte LaFontaine. However, there is some suggestion in correspondence of the time that he was dissatisfied at not being appointed to the Executive Council, the provincial Cabinet.

Judah participated in a major campaign gathering by the Canada East reformers during the 1844 election campaign. He was defeated by another reform candidate, Louis Guillet. He never participated again in electoral politics.

== Friendship with Papineau ==
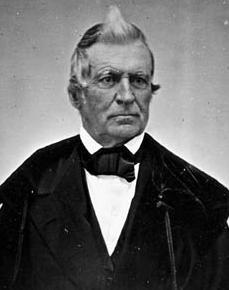
Louis-Joseph Papineau, Patriote leader and friend of Henry and Harline Judah

After the 1843 session concluded, the Judahs went on a lengthy trip to Europe, where they met up with Louis-Joseph Papineau, then in exile because of his role in the Lower Canada Rebellion. They appear to have been firm friends, agreeing in their lively discussions on Canadian politics, and at one point sharing rental accommodations. The Judahs appear to have given Papineau financial support, as he was without income and struggling to obtain arrears for his pre-Rebellion service as Speaker of the Legislative Assembly of Lower Canada. There is also some indication in Papineau's correspondence that the Judahs were prepared to help the Papineaus obtain housing in Montreal, either by buying the Papineaus' current house at a good price, or renting them a property.

== Legal and business career ==
Judah was appointed Queen's Counsel in 1854, and in 1855 was named one of the commissioners appointed to implement the abolition of the seigneurial system. His work on the commission took up a significant amount of time and energy, as it required case-by-case analysis of appropriate compensation and boundary allocations.

He helped found the Montreal City and District Savings Bank (now the Laurentian Bank of Canada) and later served as its president, during some challenging years. Judah was a promoter of the Montreal and Bytown Railway, which failed five years after it began operations. He also had extensive real estate holdings in Old Montreal.

Although he was not involved directly in electoral politics, Judah remained connected to the LaFontaine group, later known as the Parti bleu. In 1863, when the Liberal/Rouge government opened a commission of inquiry into allegations of fraud by a Bleu supporter who held two government posts, Alexandre-Maurice Delisle, Judah was one of several major Bleus who testified on Delisle's behalf.

== Later life and death ==
Judah and his wife lived in a house on Dorchester Boulevard, called "Le Bocage". According to Papineau's letters, Harline Judah was in very poor health in late 1858 and early 1859. After his wife's death, Judah gave a substantial tract of land in downtown Montreal to the Grey Nuns, in memory of his wife.

When he retired, Judah ceded his legal practice to his nephew, Frederick Thomas Judah. Henry Judah died at Montreal in 1883. He was buried from the Anglican church of St. James.
