= James Walker (Canadian judge) =

Canadian politician and judge (1756–1800)

James Walker (1756 – January 31, 1800) was a lawyer, judge and political figure in Lower Canada.

He was probably born in England and later came to Quebec City. Walker took part in the defence of the town against an invasion by the Americans in 1775–6. Soon afterwards, he moved to Montreal and he was admitted to the bar there in 1777. He was elected to the 1st Parliament of Lower Canada for Montreal County in 1792. In 1794, he was named judge in the Court of Common Pleas for Montreal, Quebec and Trois-Rivières districts. Later that year, Walker was named to the Court of King's Bench at Montreal.

He died in Montreal in 1800.

His daughter Juliana married James Sutherland Rudd, an Anglican priest at William-Henry, and, after Rudd's death, married Jean-Marie Mondelet, a Montreal notary and member of the legislative assembly. Walker's brother Thomas also was a lawyer and a member of the legislative assembly.
