= Joseph Dufour =

Canadian politician

Joseph Dufour, dit Bona

Member of the Legislative Assembly of Lower Canada for Northumberland
- In office 1792–1796

Personal details
- Born: October 7, 1744 Petite-Rivière, Canada
- Died: December 15, 1829 (aged 85) Île aux Coudres, Lower Canada

Joseph Dufour, dit Bona (October 7, 1744 – December 15, 1829) was a farmer and political figure in Lower Canada.

He was born Joseph-Michel Dufour at Petite-Rivière in 1744. He married Charlotte, the daughter of Guillaume Tremblay, in 1771 and went to live on Île aux Coudres. He supported his family by farming and hunting belugas. The seigneur of the island was the Séminaire de Québec and, on occasion, Dufour acted as their agent. He was selected as one of the two millers on the island. By 1792, Dufour had been named a captain in the local militia and, in that year, was elected to the 1st Parliament of Lower Canada for Northumberland. At 6 feet 7 inches in height, he was easily the tallest member of the assembly. Dufour was promoted to lieutenant-colonel in the militia in 1794 and served until his resignation in 1825. His wife died in 1792; his eldest daughter died the following year and he was left with two young daughters.

Dufour died at Île aux Coudres in 1829. One of his sons-in-law inherited his assets.
