= Benjamin Hart (businessman) =

Canadian businessman

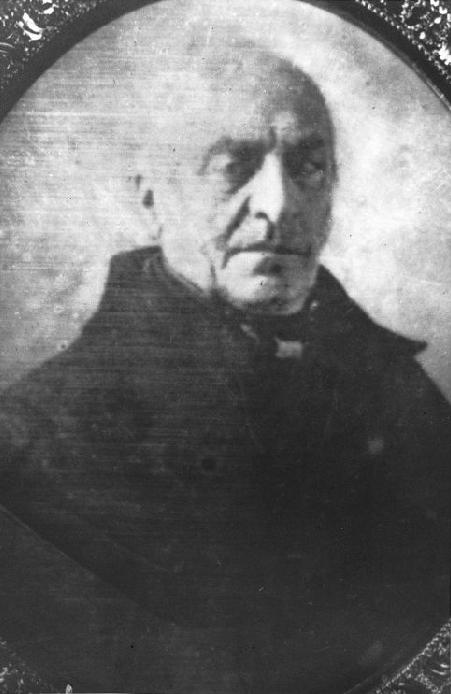
- Benjamin Hart, New York City, about 1855
- Born: August 12, 1779; Montreal, Quebec
- Died: February 27, 1855 (aged 75); New York City
- Resting place: Beth Olom Cemetery, Queens

Benjamin Hart (August 10, 1779 – February 27, 1855) was a Canadian businessman, militia officer, and justice of the peace.

== Biography ==
=== Early life ===
Benjamin Hart was born in Montreal to Aaron Hart, a prominent merchant of Trois-Rivières, and Dorothea Judah.

Benjamin was educated in New York and Philadelphia and by 1798 had returned to Trois-Rivières to assist with the family's extensive business. When Aaron died in 1800, Benjamin inherited the family's main store in Trois-Rivières and their Montreal house.

In 1806, he married Harriot Judith Hart, daughter of stockbroker Ephraim Hart. They had numerous children.

He supported the cause of Jewish civil liberties, and supported his brother Ezekiel in his thwarted political career. He helped push for a law, passed in 1831, that granted equality of civil liberties to Jews. He was an active member of Montreal's Jewish congregation.

With improved civil liberties, he was able to become a justice of the peace in 1837.

He served in the War of 1812 as a private under Captain John Ogilvy. He continued a career in the militia for many years after, commanding the 3rd Militia Battalion in Montreal by 1846 with the rank of lieutenant-colonel.

He ran the import firm Benjamin Hart and Company, with his son Theodore joining as a partner by 1844. However, he declared bankruptcy in 1848.

He opposed the Rebellion Losses Bill of 1849, and signed the Annexation Manifesto, advocating economic and political union with the United States. He then moved to New York where he died. Son Henry N. Hart moved to mid west and daughter Frances Hart Schoyer remained in NYC.
