= David Lynd =

Canadian politician

David Lynd (c.1745 – June 29, 1802) was a seigneur and political figure in Lower Canada.

He is believed to have been born in Scotland around 1745. In 1767, he was named English clerk for the Court of Common Pleas of Quebec and register of the Vice admiralty court. He served as a lieutenant in the militia during the American invasion of Quebec in 1775–6. In 1777, he was named clerk of the peace and clerk of the crown. He served as coroner for Quebec District from 1779 to 1792. Lynd bought the rights to the fief of Sasseville in 1779 with his brother John; he became sole owner in 1785. In 1789, with others, he built a toll bridge over the Saint-Charles River. He was elected to the 1st Parliament of Lower Canada for Quebec County in 1792. In 1794, Lynd was named prothonotary and register of the court for Quebec District and, in 1795, clerk for the Court of General Sessions of the Peace. Lynd owned slaves and voted against a bill in 1793 which would have abolished slavery in Lower Canada. He owned a number of properties near the town of Quebec.

He died at Quebec in 1802.
