= Alexandre Bareil, dit Lajoie =

Canadian politician

Alexandre Bareil, dit Lajoie (August 8, 1822 – November 1862) was a farmer and political figure in Canada East. He represented Lanaudière division in the Legislative Council of the Province of Canada in 1862. His name also appears as Alexandre Bareil.

He was born in Maskinongé, the son of Alexis Bareil, dit Lajoie and Esther Roy, and was educated at the Séminaire de Nicolet. Bareil dit Lajoie joined the religious order and taught at the seminary from 1844 to 1845, when he left the order. He was mayor of Maskinongé and county prefect from 1855 to 1857. He also served as justice of the peace and secretary-treasurer for the school board. In 1857, he married Marie-Christine, the daughter of Jean-Olivier Arcand. Bareil dit Lajoie died in office on November 18 or 19 in 1862 at the age of 40.
