= François Lévesque (lawyer) =

Canadian politician (1772–1823)

François Lévesque (June 17, 1772 – October 13, 1823) was a lawyer and political figure in Lower Canada. He represented Surrey in the Legislative Assembly of Lower Canada from 1800 to 1804.

He was born François-Étienne Lévesque in Quebec City, the son of François Lévesque and Catherine Trottier Desauniers Beaubien. Lévesque studied law with Jean-Antoine Panet and Alexis Caron, was called to the bar in 1796 and set up practice in Montreal. He served as a major in the Quebec City militia. Lévesque lived outside of the province, probably in New York, from 1807 to 1811, when he returned to Montreal. He was married twice: to Cécile Robert in 1796 and then to Sarah Ann Morriss in 1823. He did not run for reelection in 1804. Lévesque died in Montreal at the age of 51.

He was a cousin of Pierre Guerout.
