= John Barnes (British Army officer) =

British Army officer and politician

John Barnes (c. 1746 – 30 April 1810) was an army officer and politician in the British army who came to Canada as part of the reinforcements against the Americans in 1776.

He was elected to the 1st Parliament of Lower Canada in 1792 in the riding of William Henry. He spent his time supporting the English party until the end of the 1st parliament in 1796.
