= Étienne Ranvoyzé =

Canadian politician

Étienne Ranvoyzé (March 10, 1776 – August 9, 1826) was a notary and political figure in Lower Canada.

He was born in Quebec City, and was the son of silversmith François Ranvoyzé, and studied at the Petit Séminaire de Québec. He articled with Jean-Marie Mondelet, qualified to practice in 1799 and partnered with Mondelet for some time, later settling at Trois-Rivières. He was lieutenant and later captain in the local militia during the War of 1812 and fought at the Battle of Châteauguay and at Plattsburgh. He returned to his notary practice after the war. Ranvoyzé was named a justice of the peace in 1815. He was elected to the Legislative Assembly of Lower Canada for Trois-Rivières in 1824, generally supporting the parti canadien.

He died in office at Trois-Rivières.

His nephew Pierre Antoine Deblois became a member of the Canadian senate.

Political offices
| Preceded by Charles Richard Ogden, Tory; Joseph Badeaux, Tory | MLA, District of Trois-Rivières; 1824–1826; With: Amable Berthelot, Parti Canadien | Succeeded by Charles Richard Ogden, Tory; Amable Berthelot, Parti Canadien |
