= Champlain (Province of Canada electoral district) =

Electoral district in former Province of Canada

Coordinates: 46.779°N 73.026°W

Province of Canada electoral district

Defunct pre-Confederation electoral district
- Legislature: Legislative Assembly of the Province of Canada
- District created: 1841
- District abolished: 1867
- First contested: 1841
- Last contested: 1863

Champlain (French pronunciation: [ʃɑ̃plɛ̃]) was an electoral district of the Legislative Assembly of the Parliament of the Province of Canada, in Canada East. It was on the north shore of the Saint Lawrence River, with the town of Champlain being the main centre of the district.

The electoral district was established in 1841, when the Province of Canada was created by the merger of Lower Canada and Upper Canada by the Union Act, 1840. It was based on the previous electoral district of the same name for the Legislative Assembly of Lower Canada.

Champlain was represented by one Member in the Legislative Assembly. The electoral district was abolished in 1867 upon the creation of Canada and the province of Quebec.

== Boundaries ==
The electoral district of Champlain was located on the north shore of the Saint Lawrence River, centred on the town of Champlain (in the current Mauricie area), and close to Trois-Rivières.

The Union Act, 1840 merged the two provinces of Lower Canada and Upper Canada into the Province of Canada, with a single Parliament. The separate parliaments of Lower Canada and Upper Canada were abolished.

The Union Act provided that the pre-existing electoral boundaries of Lower Canada and Upper Canada would continue to be used in the new Parliament, unless altered by the Union Act itself. The Champlain electoral district of Lower Canada was not altered by the Act, and therefore continued with the same boundaries which had been set by a statute of Lower Canada in 1829:

The County of Champlain shall be bounded on the north east by the County of Portneuf, on the south west by the River Saint Maurice, on the south east by the River Saint Lawrence, and on the north west by the northern boundary of the Province; which County so bounded comprises the Seigniories of Saint Anne and its augmentation, Sainte Marie, Batiscan, Champlain, Cap de la Magdeleine, and all the islands in the River Saint Lawrence nearest to and in front of the said county.

Elections were held at the "Ferry nearest the River Saint Lawrence on the north east of the River Batiscan."

== Members of the Legislative Assembly (1841–1867) ==
Champlain was a single-member constituency.

The following were the members of the Legislative Assembly from Champlain. Party affiliations are based on the biographies of individual members given by the National Assembly of Quebec, as well as votes in the Legislative Assembly. "Party" was a fluid concept, especially during the early years of the Province of Canada.

Parliament	Members	Years in Office	Party
1st Parliament; 1841–1844	René-Joseph Kimber (Note: Appointed to the Legislative Council of the Province of Canada in September 1843, automatically vacating his seat in the Assembly: Côté, Political Appointments and Elections, p. 59, note (7).)	1841–1843	Anti-unionist; French-Canadian Group
1st Parliament; 1841–1844	Henry Judah (Note: Elected in by-election September 22, 1843: Côté, Political Appointments and Elections, p. 59, note (8).)	1843–1844 (by-election)	French-Canadian Group
2nd Parliament; 1844–1847	Louis Guillet	1844–1851	French-Canadian Group
3rd Parliament; 1848–1851	Louis Guillet	1844–1851	French-Canadian Group
4th Parliament; 1851–1854	Thomas Marchildon	1851–1857	Liberal
5th Parliament; 1854–1857	Thomas Marchildon	1851–1857	Rouge
6th Parliament; 1858–1861	Joseph-Édouard Turcotte	1858–1861	Bleu
7th Parliament; 1861–1863	John Jones Ross	1861–1867	Bleu
8th Parliament; 1863–1867	John Jones Ross	1861–1867	Confederation; Bleu

== Abolition ==
The district was abolished on July 1, 1867, when the British North America Act, 1867 came into force, splitting the Province of Canada into Quebec and Ontario. It was succeeded by electoral districts of the same name in the House of Commons of Canada and the Legislative Assembly of Quebec.

== See also ==
- List of elections in the Province of Canada
