= Georges-Hippolyte le Comte Dupré =

Canadian politician (1738–1797)

Georges-Hippolyte le Comte Dupré (March 23, 1738 – November 26, 1797) was a businessman, official and political figure in Lower Canada. He was also known as Saint-Georges Dupré.

He was born in Montreal in 1738, the son of Jean-Baptiste le Comte Dupré, a merchant there. George-Hippolyte entered business as a merchant as well. In 1764, he married Marie-Charlotte, the daughter of lieutenant Daniel-Hyacinthe-Marie Liénard de Beaujeu; she died five years later. In 1770, he married Marie-Louise-Charlotte, the daughter of Luc de la Corne; she died the following year. When the Americans invaded the province in 1775, Le Comte Dupré was a major in the Montreal militia, later becoming colonel. His brother, also named Jean-Baptiste, also served as an officer in the militia. From 1775 until 1797, Georges-Hippolyte served as a transport officer in the militia for supplies in the Montreal district and was imprisoned at Fort Chambly by the Americans after the capture of Montreal. In 1783, he was named deputy chief road commissioner for Montreal district. He also served as inspector of police at Montreal from 1788 to 1797. In 1792, Georges-Hippolyte was elected to the 1st Parliament of Lower Canada for Huntingdon.

He died at Montreal in 1797.
