= Edward Barnard (politician) =

Canadian politician

Edward Barnard was a politician from Quebec, Canada and a Member of the Legislative Assembly of Lower Canada.

== Background ==
He was born around 1806. A son, Édouard-André Barnard, gained some notability as a militia officer in Lower Canada.

== Member of the legislature ==
He ran as a Patriote candidate in the district of Trois-Rivières in 1834 and won. His tenure came to an end on March 27, 1838 when the constitution that ruled the colony was suspended.

== Rebellions of 1837 ==
He was arrested in November 1838 for his involvement in the Rebellions of 1837 and put in jail in Montreal, but was released in December of the same year.

== Retirement from Politics ==
Barnard eventually made a career as a clerk of court in the Mauricie area and retired in 1878. He died in the United States in June 1885.

== Footnotes ==
Political offices
Preceded by Jean Desfossés, Patriote; René-Joseph Kimber, Patriote	MLA, District of Trois-Rivières; 1834–1838; With: René-Joseph Kimber, Patriote	Constitution suspended in 1838
