= Pierre Guerout =

Canadian politician

Personal details
- Born: August 31, 1751 Mille Ville, Rouen, Kingdom of France
- Died: June 23, 1830 (aged 78) William-Henry, Quebec, Lower Canada

Pierre Guerout (August 31, 1751 – June 23, 1830) was a businessman and political figure in Lower Canada. He was born Pierre-Guillaume Guerout in the parish of Mille Ville, Rouen, France in 1751, the son of a Huguenot merchant, and came to Quebec City around 1767. He apprenticed with his uncle, François Lévesque. He took part in the defence of the town against the American invasion of 1775–6. He later set up his own business and had moved to Saint-Antoine-sur-Richelieu by 1783. In 1785, he was named a justice of the peace there. He moved to Saint-Denis in 1787. In 1792, Guerout was elected to the 1st Parliament of Lower Canada for Richelieu County. In 1802, he was named lieutenant-colonel in the local militia. He was named a commissioner for the improvement of internal communications in 1817; this commission was responsible for maintenance and upkeep of roads and transportation on the Richelieu River between William-Henry (later Sorel) and Chambly. In 1821, he was named commissioner for the trial of small causes.

In 1827, he suffered an attack of apoplexy that left him incapable of managing his affairs and his son took over the operation of the business. Guerout died at William-Henry in 1830.

His cousin, François Lévesque, also served in the legislative assembly.
