= Moses Hart =

Canadian businessman (1768–1852)

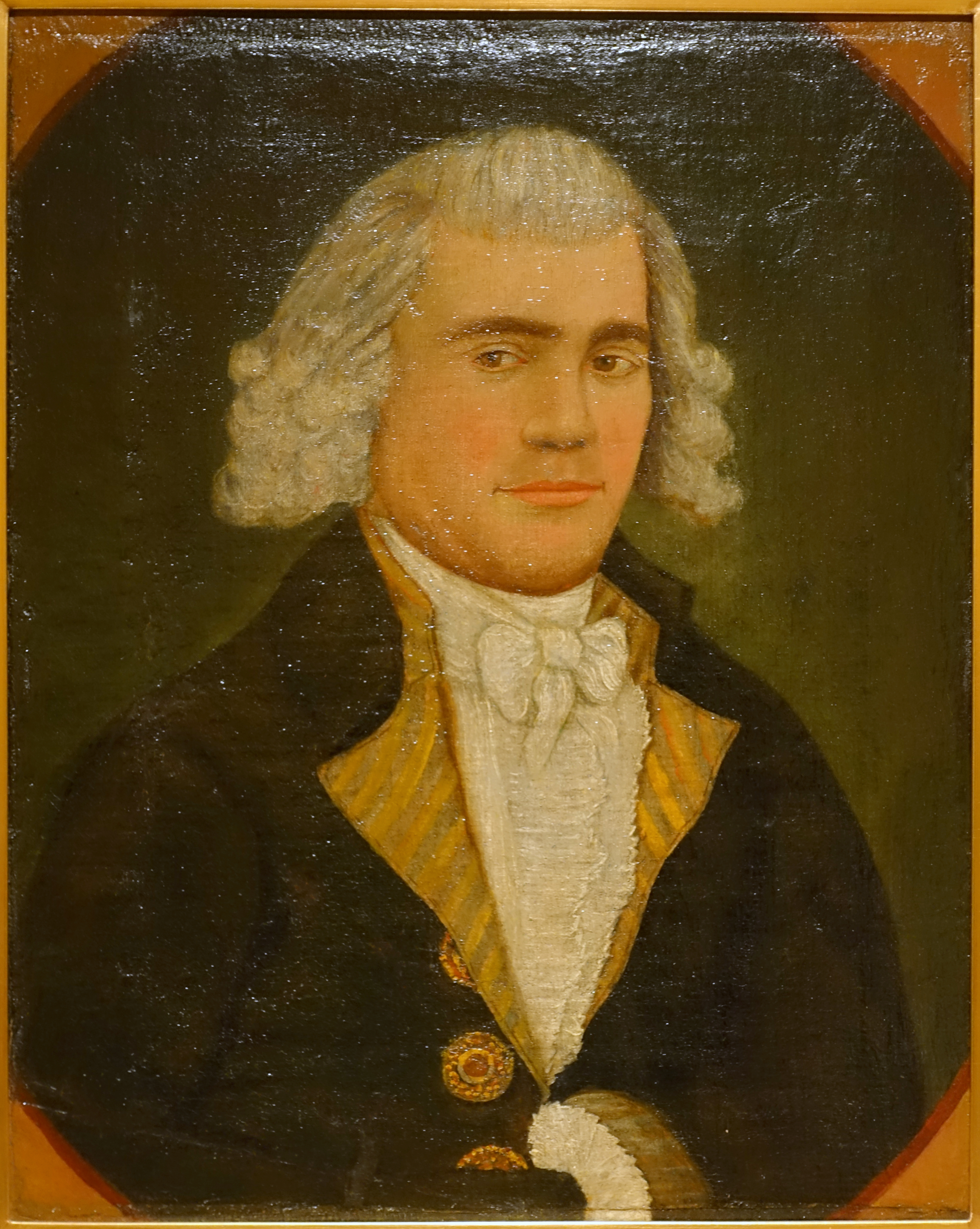
- Moses Hart, c. 1789
- Born: November 26, 1768; Trois-Rivières, Province of Quebec
- Died: October 15, 1852 (aged 83); Trois-Rivières, Canada East

Moses Hart (November 26, 1768 – October 15, 1852) was a Canadian businessman and seigneur, eldest son of Aaron Hart.

== Biography ==
Moses Hart was born in Trois-Rivières to Aaron Hart and Dorothea Judah.

He was an unsuccessful candidate for the Legislative Assembly of Lower Canada, attempting to follow in the footsteps of his brother Ezekiel.

He invested in banks and had a successful business career, particularly in the shipping business. In 1824, he bought one ship, the Telegraph, from John Molson, and in 1833 he jointly invested with John Miller to buy the Lady Aylmer. He gave his share of the latter ship to his adopted son Alexander Thomas Hart, but Miller and the son had a falling-out. He continued in the shipping business with his son Alexander Thomas and with his nephew Ira Craig Hart.
