= Marie-Joseph Godefroy de Tonnancour =

Canadian politician

Marie-Joseph Godefroy de Tonnancour (June 5, 1786 – September 2, 1850) was a seigneur and political figure in Lower Canada. He represented Trois-Rivières in the Legislative Assembly of Lower Canada in 1820.

He was born in Yamaska, the son of Joseph-Marie Godefroy de Tonnancour and Marie-Catherine Pélissier, and was educated at the Séminaire de Québec, the College Louis le Grand in Paris and Oxford University. Godefroy de Tonnancour received his commission as a lieutenant in the militia in 1803 and served as a captain during the War of 1812, later reaching the rank of lieutenant-colonel. He became co-seigneur of Yamaska in 1834 following the death of his father. Elected to the assembly in April 1820, Godefroy de Tonnancour did not run for reelection in the election held in July 1820. He was married twice: first to his cousin Marie-Anne Pélissier in 1815 and then to his cousin Charlotte Godefroy de Tonnancour in 1835. He died in Yamaska at the age of 64.

His brother Léonard also served in the assembly. His sister Agnès-Élizabeth married Léon Rousseau. Marguerite, the sister of his first wife, married Jean-Olivier Arcand, who also served in the assembly.

Political offices
Preceded by Pierre Vézina, Tory; Charles Richard Ogden, Tory	MLA, District of Trois-Rivières; 1820; With: Charles Richard Ogden, Tory	Succeeded by Joseph Badeaux, Parti canadien Charles Richard Ogden, Tory
