= Jean-Marie Mondelet =

Canadian politician

Jean-Marie Mondelet (ca. 1771 – June 15, 1843) was a notary and political figure in Lower Canada.

He was born in Saint-Charles-sur-Richelieu around 1771, the son of Dominique Mondelet, and studied at the Collège Saint-Raphaël and the Petit Séminaire de Quebec. He articled as a notary, qualified to practice in 1794 and set up practice at Saint-Marc-sur-Richelieu, later taking on Étienne Ranvoyzé as a partner. He married Charlotte Boucher de Grosbois in January 1798. Later that year, he was named a justice of the peace. In 1802, Mondelet moved his practice to Montreal. In 1804, he was elected to the Legislative Assembly of Lower Canada for Montreal West and, in 1808, for Montreal East, generally voting with the parti canadien. In 1810, he was appointed joint president of the Court of Quarter Sessions at Montreal. In 1811, he married Juliana Walker, the widow of an Anglican priest and daughter of judge James Walker. In 1811, he became a police magistrate and, in 1812, was named coroner for Montreal. Mondelet served as a major in the militia during the War of 1812, he later became lieutenant-colonel and then commander of a militia battalion. In 1821, he was named a king's notary, which allowed him to perform as a notary on behalf of the government. As a moderate nationalist, Mondelet was sometimes viewed with suspicion by both the more radical nationalists and the authorities. His title of king's notary was removed in 1827. However, he was named to the Montreal Board of Health in 1832.

He died at Trois-Rivières in 1843.

His son Dominique became a lawyer and judge and also served in the legislative assembly. His son Charles-Elzéar also became a lawyer and judge.
