= François Dambourgès =

Canadian politician

François Dambourgès (April 1741 – December 13, 1798) was a businessman, militia officer and political figure in Lower Canada.

He was born in Salies, France in 1741 and studied at Bayonne. Dambourges came to the parish of Saint-Thomas in Montmagny, Quebec in 1763, where he established a business. He served with the Royal Highland Emigrants and helped defend the town of Quebec during the American invasion of 1775–6. Dambourgès became a lieutenant in 1776 and was taken prisoner in 1777. He retired on half pay in 1784. He was named a justice of the peace and served in the local militia, becoming colonel in 1790. In 1792, he was elected to the 1st Parliament of Lower Canada for Devon.

In 1795, Dambourgès became a captain in the Royal Canadian Volunteer Regiment and moved to Montreal. He died there of pleurisy in 1798.

His daughter Marie-Elizabeth later married Roger, the son of Augustin-Jérôme Raby.
