= Jean Digé =

Canadian politician

Jean Digé (ca. 1736 – July 14, 1813) was a sailor and political figure in Lower Canada.

He was born Jean-Charles Digé at Forillon, Avranches, France around 1736 and was trained from an early age as a mariner. He settled at Sainte-Anne de-la-Pocatière, Lower Canada in 1762. He owned a fishing boat and farm land in the region. Digé was elected to the 1st Parliament of Lower Canada for Cornwallis in 1792, serving until 1796. He was named surveyor of roads for Sainte-Anne de-la-Pocatière in 1797.

He died at Sainte-Anne de-la-Pocatière in 1813.
