= Pierre Vézina =

Canadian politician (1772–1852)

Pierre Vézina (November 19, 1772 – December 4, 1852) was a lawyer and political figure in Lower Canada. He represented Trois-Rivières in the Legislative Assembly of Lower Canada from 1816 to 1820.

He was born in Quebec City, the son of Pierre Vézina and Marie-Charlotte Deguise, and studied law with Jean-Antoine Panet. Vézina was called to the Lower Canada bar in 1798 and practised law in Quebec City for several months before moving to Trois-Rivières. In 1798, he married Julie Ménard. He was named a King's Counsel in 1824. Vézina was a commissioner for construction of a bridge over the Saint-Maurice River as well as serving as a justice of the peace. He was also a captain in the militia during the War of 1812.

Vézina was an unsuccessful candidate for a seat in the assembly in 1806, in an 1807 by-election and in 1808. He did not run for reelection in 1820. Vézina died in Trois-Rivières at the age of 80.

Political offices
Preceded by Amable Berthelot, Parti canadien Charles Richard Ogden, Tory	MLA, District of Trois-Rivières; 1816–1820; With: Charles Richard Ogden, Tory	Succeeded by Marie-Joseph Godefroy de Tonnancour, Parti canadien Charles Richard Ogden, Tory
