= Léonard Godefroy de Tonnancour =

Canadian politician

Léonard Godefroy de Tonnancour (November 6, 1793 – January 29, 1867) was a political figure in Lower Canada.

He was born in Saint-Michel-d'Yamaska in 1793, the son of seigneur Joseph-Marie Godefroy de Tonnancour and studied at the Séminaire de Nicolet. He worked as an administrator on the family estates. He inherited part of the seigneuries of Yamaska and Saint-François, as well as property in Acton County, in 1834. Godefroy de Tonnancour was elected to the Legislative Assembly of Lower Canada for Yamaska in an 1832 by-election; he was reelected in 1834. He voted in support of the Ninety-Two Resolutions. After the constitution was suspended in 1838, Godefroy de Tonnancour retired from politics. In 1835, he had married Marguerite, the daughter of Benjamin-Hyacinthe-Martin Cherrier, surveyor and former member of the legislative assembly.

He died at Saint-Michel-d’Yamaska in 1867.

His older brother Marie-Joseph became co-seigneur after the death of their father and was a member of the legislative assembly.
