= Édouard-André Barnard =

Canadian militia officer

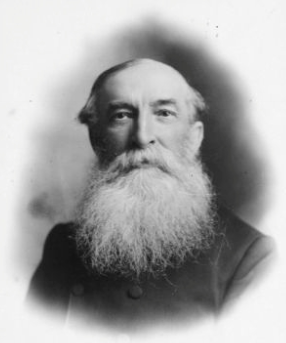
- Born: September 30, 1835; Trois-Rivières, Lower Canada
- Died: August 19, 1898 (aged 62); L'Ange-Gardien, Quebec

Édouard-André Barnard (September 30, 1835 – August 19, 1898) was a Lower Canada born militia officer. He was trained as a lawyer, generally well educated and, through family circumstances, a farmer for some time at the family property in Trois-Rivières. His father was Edward Barnard, a politician from Trois-Rivières.

Barnard eventually gravitated toward a career in the militia. By 1867, now a major, he offered his services to Bishop Ignace Bourget and put together a force to assist Pope Pius IX in defending against attacks on the Papal State by Giuseppe Garibaldi. The defenses were successful, but many questioned his motives, and he soon returned to farming.
