= Léon Rousseau =

Canadian politician (1798–1869)

Léon Rousseau (July 22, 1798 – November 3, 1869) was a farm owner and political figure in Canada East. He represented Yamaska in the Legislative Assembly of the Province of Canada from 1844 to 1848.

He was born in Saint-Pierre-les-Becquets, the son of Joseph Rousseau and Josephte Trudel, and studied medicine in the United States. Rousseau was authorized to practise medicine in Lower Canada in 1822 and set up practice in Yamaska. He also was involved in agriculture and served as a justice of the peace. In 1824, he married Agnès-Élizabeth, the daughter of Joseph-Marie Godefroy de Tonnancour. Rousseau did not run for reelection to the assembly in 1848. He died in Yamaska at the age of 71.
