= Pierre Marcoux =

Pierre Marcoux (January 2, 1757 – November 20, 1809) was a businessman and militia officer in Lower Canada.

He was born at Quebec City in 1757, the son of Pierre Marcoux and his first wife, Geneviève Lepage. Marcoux served in the militia during the defence of the town against the Americans in 1775-6. At the end of the American Revolution, he was placed on half pay and received a grant of land. He married Marie-Anne, the daughter of Quebec merchant Louis Dunière, in 1783. In 1785, in partnership with his father-in-law and other Quebec merchants, he organized an expedition to Baie des Esquimaux (Hamilton Inlet) on the Labrador coast to harvest seals. Although the first trip was not particularly successful, in 1788, they were able to trade supplies with the local natives for seals, despite a dispute with two other traders active in the area and continued to trade in the area during the 1790s. From 1796 to 1802, he served as a captain in the Royal Canadian Volunteer Regiment.

In 1797, Marcoux received a share of the family farm after the death of his father. He sold his share to his father-in-law and settled at Montreal. He became a member there of the Club des Apôtres, which held monthly gastronomic suppers. In 1809, he was named overseer of highways for Quebec district but he died soon afterwards of pleurisy at Berthier in 1809.
