= Pierre Legras Pierreville =

Canadian politician

- Born: 1738; Montreal, Quebec, Canada
- Died: July 22, 1810 (aged 71–72); Boucherville, Quebec, Canada
- Occupations: Businessman, Seigneur, Political figure
- Known for: Member of the 1st Parliament of Lower Canada for Kent County (later Chambly County)

Pierre Legras Pierreville (1738 – July 22, 1810) was a businessman, seigneur and political figure in Lower Canada.

He was born Pierre Legras at Montreal in 1738, the son of a merchant there. He became a merchant at Saint-François-du-Lac. He inherited the seigneury of Pierreville from his father in 1768, added Pierreville to his name and soon afterwards settled at Boucherville. In 1779, he married Charlotte, daughter of seigneur René Boucher de La Bruère. Pierreville served in the militia, becoming lieutenant-colonel in 1802. He was a commissioner for a census held in 1784 and was named justice of the peace for Montreal district in 1799. Pierreville was elected to the 1st Parliament of Lower Canada for Kent County (later Chambly County) in 1792.

He died at Boucherville in 1810.
