= Pierre Marcoux Sr. =

Canadian politician

Pierre Marcoux (1731 – July 9, 1797) was a businessman and political figure in Lower Canada.

He was born at Quebec City in 1731. He was a merchant there until 1783, when he settled on a farm near Berthier. With others, he became involved in the production, shipping and sale of flour. Marcoux also owned a store in Quebec City. He served as a captain in the militia during the defence of Quebec against the Americans during 1775–6, and was later promoted to lieutenant-colonel. He also served as justice of the peace. He was elected to the 1st Parliament of Lower Canada for Hertford in 1792.

He died at Berthier in 1797.

His son Pierre married Marie-Anne, the daughter of Louis Dunière.
