= Joel Hart (doctor) =

American physician

Joel Hart was a medical doctor; the only son of Ephraim Hart; born in Philadelphia in about 1784; died in New York City June 14, 1842. He received the degree of LRCS from the Royal College of Physicians and Surgeons, London. He was one of the charter members of the Medical Society of the County of New York. He married, May 2, 1810, in London, to Louisa Levien, and had issue born in London and Montral. On Feb. 7, 1817, he was appointed by President James Madison United States consul at Leith, Scotland, and held that position until 1832, though he had left Edinburgh many years before, first moving to London and then Montreal. In 1832 when he returned to New York practicing medicine as he had done in London and Montreal.
