= Robert Lester (politician) =

Canadian politician

Robert Lester (ca 1746 – July 12, 1807) was a businessman and political figure in Lower Canada.

He was born in Galway, Ireland around 1746 and came to the town of Quebec around 1770. He became a merchant there, importing cloth and spirits, exporting wheat, supplying provisions to the army and providing small loans to individuals. He served in the militia as a captain during the American invasion of 1775–6. Lester was among those lobbying for a representative assembly and, in 1792, he was elected to the 1st Parliament of Lower Canada for the Lower Town of Quebec; he was defeated in 1796 but elected again in 1800. He was named lieutenant-colonel in the militia in 1799. With his nephew, Robert Morrogh, as partner, Lester's business expanded into the timber trade; the partners had ships built for use by the business and set up a distillery and a brewery. Lester was also speculating in land in the Eastern Townships. As a Roman Catholic, he was able to cultivate close ties with the Quebec clergy, including Bishop Joseph-Octave Plessis.

Although on the surface the company appeared to be doing well, it had overextended itself financially and went bankrupt in 1807, a common fate of businesses importing goods at that time. Lester died at Quebec City a few months later.
