= Joseph-Marie Godefroy de Tonnancour =

Canadian politician

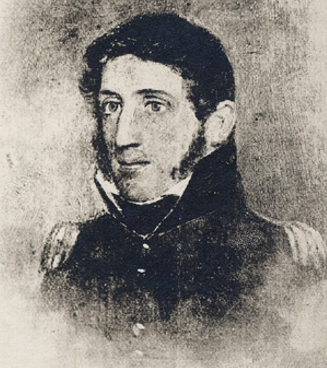

Member of the Legislative Assembly of Lower Canada for Buckingham
- In office 1792–1796

Personal details
- Born: August 15, 1750 Trois-Rivières, Canada
- Died: November 22, 1834 (aged 84) Yamaska, Lower Canada
- Relations: Michel-Eustache-Gaspard-Alain Chartier de Lotbinière, brother-in-law Léon Rousseau, son-in-law
- Children: Léonard Godefroy de Tonnancour

Joseph-Marie Godefroy de Tonnancour (August 15, 1750 – November 22, 1834) was a seigneur and political figure in Lower Canada.

He was born in Trois-Rivières in 1750, the son of Louis-Joseph Godefroy de Tonnancour. He was educated at the Petit Séminaire de Québec, the Collège Louis-le-Grand in Paris and Oxford University. He returned to Quebec in 1775. Godefroy de Tonnancour took part in the defence of Fort St. Johns (later Saint-Jean-sur-Richelieu) against the invading Americans but was taken prisoner. He was released in 1777. He remained a member of the local militia until 1831, becoming lieutenant-colonel in 1784. After his father's death in 1784, he inherited part of the seigneury of Yamaska, becoming sole owner in 1787. He became a justice of the peace in 1784. Godefroy de Tonnancour opposed the reform of the constitution in 1788 but, in 1792, was elected to the 1st Parliament of Lower Canada for Buckingham. He served as commissioner for the building of churches in Trois-Rivières district and then was a commissioner of roads and bridges.

He died at Yamaska in 1834.

His sons, Léonard and Marie-Joseph, both served in the legislative assembly. His daughter Agnès-Élizabeth married Léon Rousseau. His half sister, Josette Godefroy de Tonnancour, was the first wife of Michel-Eustache-Gaspard-Alain Chartier de Lotbinière.
