= Legrá =

Legrá is a surname. Notable people with the surname include:

- José Legrá (1943–2026), Cuban-Spanish boxer
- Roberto Legrá Sotolongo, Cuban military officer
