= Joseph-Hubert Lacroix =

Canadian politician

Joseph-Hubert Lacroix (May 5, 1743 – July 15, 1821) was a seigneur, businessman and political figure in Lower Canada.

He was born Hubert-Joseph Lacroix in the Lower Town of Quebec City in 1743, the son of merchant Hubert-Joseph de la Croix. Lacroix would become a merchant himself in the town and helped defend it during the American invasion of 1775–6. In 1776, he settled at Saint-Vincent-de-Paul (later Laval), where he became involved in the fur trade. In 1791, he was named justice of the peace for Montreal district. He represented Effingham County in the 1st Parliament of Lower Canada; in 1796, he was elected to represent York County. He helped administer the seigneury of Blainville and, in 1806, inherited it from Marie-Anne-Thérèse Céloron de Blainville. In 1807, Lacroix was named a colonel in the militia.

He died at Saint-Vincent-de-Paul in 1821.

His son Janvier-Domptail became a lawyer and later a member of the legislative council.
