= James Tod (seigneur) =

Canadian politician

James Tod (c. 1742 – October 16, 1816) was a seigneur, businessman and political figure in Lower Canada.

== Career ==
He is thought to have been born in Scotland around 1742 and settled at Quebec City around 1774. Tod was involved in the importing and exporting of goods; he established a general store and also sold goods wholesale to other merchants. He purchased furs for export and was involved with the fisheries in the Gulf of Saint Lawrence and the grain trade. He acquired additional property in the town and built a wharf and warehouse. In 1792, he purchased the seigneury of Rivière-de-la-Madeleine, which was known for its salmon fishing. In the same year, he was elected to the Legislative Assembly for Devon. Although he generally voted with the British party, he supported a measure to maintain a register where legislative matters introduced in English would be translated into French. He won the contract in 1794 to supply the Royal Navy at Quebec. In 1796, with others, he acquired the seigneuries of Grosse-Île and Grandville. Tod also managed the seigneury of Saint-Gilles on behalf of a Montreal lawyer. He also owned a schooner. Tod was a member of the local militia, becoming captain in 1804. Because he was obliged on occasion to extend credit his customers, he was affected by the financial difficulties of others and often found himself owed money when they became insolvent. In 1807, Tod was forced into bankruptcy himself and had to sell most of his property. He was able to continue on in business on a smaller scale but moved into rented quarters.

=== Death ===
He died at Quebec City in 1816.
