= Jean-Olivier Arcand =

Canadian politician

Jean-Olivier Arcand (July 22, 1793 – November 14, 1875) was a land surveyor and political figure in Lower Canada. He represented Hampshire in the Legislative Assembly of Lower Canada from 1822 to 1824.

He was born in Deschambault, the son of Joseph Arcand dit Boulard and Marie-Louise Delisle, and was educated at the Séminaire de Nicolet. He served as an officer in the militia during the War of 1812. Arcand received his commission as a surveyor in 1821 and settled in Yamaska. He did not run for reelection to the assembly in 1824. In 1824, Arcand married Marguerite Pélissier, whose sister married Marie-Joseph Godefroy de Tonnancour. In 1835, he became attorney for seigneur Aignan-Aimé Massue. Arcand took part in the protests held in Lower Canada from 1837 to 1838 and was imprisoned in Montreal in March 1838; he was freed under a general amnesty in July of that same year. Prior to 1837, he had been named commissioner for the trial of minor causes, but he was stripped of that position following his arrest. From 1844 to 1852, he served as registrar for Yamaska County. Arcand died in Yamaska at the age of 82.

His daughter Marie-Christine married Alexandre Bareil, dit Lajoie.
