= Amable Berthelot =

Lower Canada lawyer, politician and author

Member of the Legislative Assembly of Lower Canada for Trois-Rivières (two-member constituency)
- In office 1814–1816 Serving with Charles Richard Ogden
- Preceded by: Mathew Bell and Thomas Coffin
- Succeeded by: Charles Richard Ogden and Pierre Vézina

Member of the Legislative Assembly of Lower Canada for Trois-Rivières (two-member constituency)
- In office 1824–1827 Serving with Étienne Ranvoyzé
- Preceded by: Joseph Badeaux and Charles Richard Ogden
- Succeeded by: Pierre-Benjamin Dumoulin and Charles Richard Ogden

Member of the Legislative Assembly of Lower Canada for Quebec (Upper Town) (two-member constituency)
- In office 1834–1838 Serving with: René-Édouard Caron (1834–1836); Andrew Stuart (1836–1838)
- Preceded by: Jean-François-Joseph Duval and Andrew Stuart
- Succeeded by: None; position abolished when Constitution suspended

Member of the Legislative Assembly of the Province of Canada for Kamouraska
- In office 1841 – 1847 (two elections)
- Preceded by: New position
- Succeeded by: Pierre Canac, dit Marquis

Personal details
- Born: February 10, 1777 Quebec City,
- Died: November 24, 1847 (aged 70) Quebec City, Old Province of Quebec
- Resting place: Notre Dame des Neiges Cemetery
- Party: Lower Canada: Government Party (Parti de Bureaucrates); Province of Canada: Independent
- Spouse: Unmarried
- Relations: Michel-Amable Berthelot Dartigny (father); Louis-Hippolyte Lafontaine (son-in-law); Joseph Badeaux (brother-in-law)
- Children: 2: daughter and son (adopted)
- Profession: Lawyer

Military service
- Allegiance: Britain
- Branch/service: Lower Canada militia
- Rank: Captain
- Unit: 1st Battalion of the Trois-Rivières militia
- Battles/wars: War of 1812

Amable Berthelot (February 10, 1777 – November 24, 1847) was a Canadian lawyer, author and political figure. He was elected to the Legislative Assembly of Lower Canada and later to the Legislative Assembly of the Province of Canada. Trained as a lawyer, he was an avid book-collector, at one point having a personal library of some fifteen hundred volumes. He did not support those who took up arms during the Lower Canada Rebellion of 1837–1838. He never married, but adopted two children, a boy and a girl. His daughter married Louis-Hippolyte LaFontaine, later co-premier of the Province of Canada. He was a literary mentor to François-Xavier Garneau.

== Early life and family ==
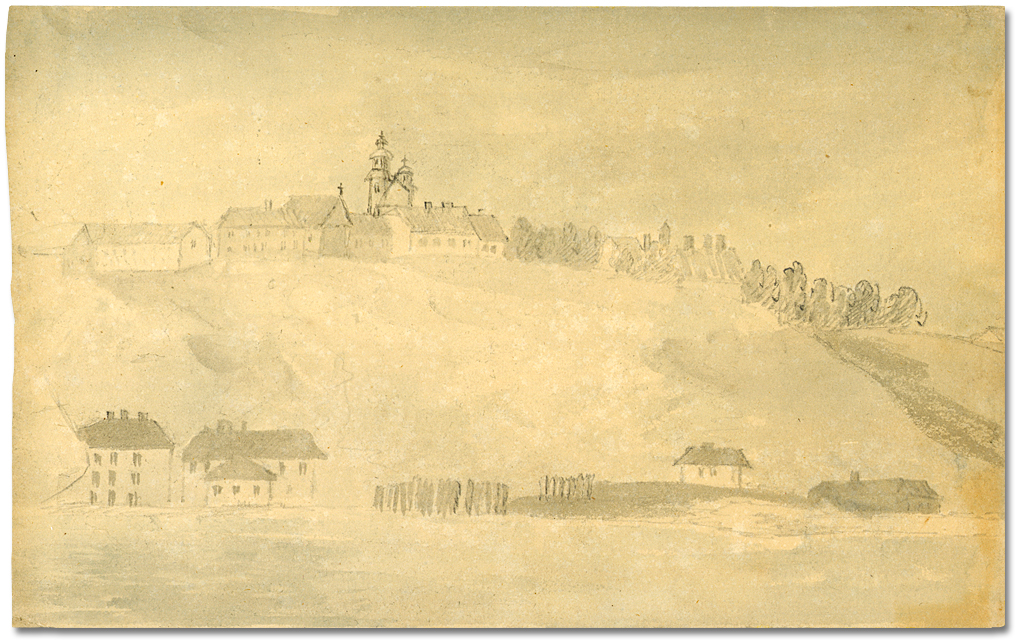
Upper and Lower Quebec, seen from the River St. Lawrence, around 1791

Berthelot was born in Quebec City in 1777, the son of Michel-Amable Berthelot Dartigny and Marie-Angélique Bazin. The Berthelots were a well-off family. Amable's grandfather, Charles Berthelot, was the son of a merchant grocer in Paris. Charles Berthelot emigrated to Quebec City in 1726 and went into business. Within a few years he was wealthy enough to buy the fief of Villeray, just outside the Porte-St-Louis. His son, Michel-Amable, went into the legal profession as a notary and lawyer, as well as inheriting Charles's estate. Michel-Amable was the representative for Quebec County in the Legislative Assembly of Lower Canada, elected by acclamation in a by-election in 1793.

Amable was the third of Michel-Amable's seven children, three of whom died in infancy. He studied at the Petit Séminaire de Québec, then articled in law with Jean-Antoine Panet, a prominent lawyer and the first Speaker of the Legislative Assembly. During his education Berthelot acquired a strong literary taste and began to build up a library. Admitted to the bar in 1799, he set up a practice at Trois-Rivières.

== Trois-Rivières: Law and politics ==
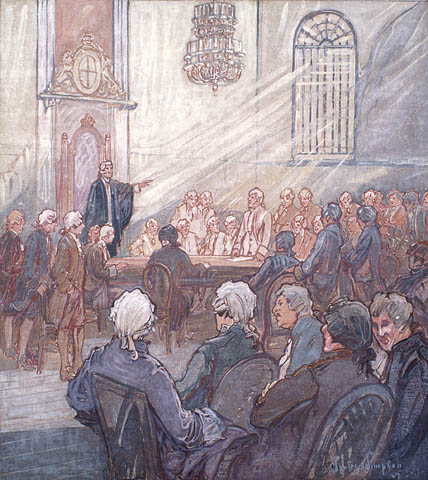
Legislative Assembly of Lower Canada, meeting in the Bishop's Chapel

The interests of the English population [of Lower Canada] are protected and defended in England, by the legislative council and by the governor. We ourselves have only the House of Assembly and we may be sending to it persons who will support our political enemies.

— Amable Berthelot

Berthelot developed a lucrative practice in Trois-Rivières. During the War of 1812, he served as a captain in the 1st Battalion of the Trois-Rivières militia. He was rewarded with land grants for his services to the Crown during the war. In 1814, he was elected to the Legislative Assembly of Lower Canada for the district, along with Charles Richard Ogden in the two member constituency. Ogden went on to hold the seat until 1833, with one short gap, and eventually was a co-premier of the Province of Canada, still representing Trois-Rivières.

In Parliament, Berthelot supported the Parti canadien but not Louis-Joseph Papineau, a fiery nationalist. Instead Berthelot supported Jean-Thomas Taschereau in the election for Speaker of the Assembly, but Papineau won the election. Berthelot only served one term at that time, and did not stand in the general election of 1816. Continuing his law practice, by 1820 he had amassed a substantial estate, and he closed his law practice in Trois-Rivières.

== Paris trips and return to politics ==
Berthelot then travelled to Paris, where he lived until 1824. It was likely at this time that he acquired most of the literary, theological and historical works which made up his personal library. His wealth also gave him the entrée into the literary salons of Paris. He returned to Lower Canada in 1824 and was again elected for Trois-Rivières in the election that year, again as a member of the Parti canadien. In the next election, in 1827, he stood as a candidate for the Parti patriote in Upper Town, Quebec City, a two-member constituency. He was defeated by the candidate for the Bureaucrats party, Andrew Stuart, and by Joseph-Rémi Vallières de Saint-Réal, a moderate member of the Parti canadien. Retiring for a time from public life, in 1831 he again left for France. It was at this time that he sold his private library by auction. The auction catalogue has not survived, but it is known from other records at the time that the collection numbered approximately fifteen hundred books, "rare and valuable books on religion, law, government, literature, and history."

Berthelot returned from his second Paris trip in 1834. He was appointed a commissioner to take oaths of allegiance. Now settled in Quebec City, he again stood for election as a member of the Parti canadien (now going by the name of Parti patriote). The election was fought largely on ethnic lines. This time, Berthelot was elected to represent Quebec City's Upper Town in the Legislative Assembly. He served one term, until the suspension of the constitution in 1838 following the Lower Canada Rebellions of 1837 and 1838. In the critical period leading up to the rebellions, Berthelot broke with the Parti canadien (now known as the Parti patriote). Timid by nature and not interested in strongly partisan politics, he joined the Quebec party, which included more moderate nationalists from the Quebec area, such as John Neilson, Elzéar Bédard, and Étienne Parent. In the lead-up to the Rebellion, he was one of the thirteen members of the Assembly who signed a request a petition from his son-in-law Louis-Hippolyte LaFontaine, calling on the Governor, the Earl of Acheson, to recall the Assembly. The Governor declined to do so. There was, however, one account by an informer who stated that in the summer of 1837, Berthelot attended a meeting of a revolutionary committee at Deux-Montagnes, where he called the Governor a robber and urged the local citizens to join in a revolt.

In one debate in the Assembly, he stated his political views as Suaviter in modo, fortiter in re ("Be steadfast in principle, conciliatory in action"). His main interest in the Assembly was in education, not surprising in one of his literary background.

== Province of Canada ==
Following the rebellion in Lower Canada, and the similar rebellion in 1837 in Upper Canada (now Ontario), the British government decided to merge the two provinces into a single province, as recommended by Lord Durham in the Durham Report. The Union Act, 1840, passed by the British Parliament, abolished the two provinces and their separate parliaments, and created the Province of Canada, with a single parliament for the entire province, composed of an elected Legislative Assembly and an appointed Legislative Council. The Governor General retained a strong position in the government.

In the first general election, Berthelot stood for election to the new Legislative Assembly in the constituency of Kamouraska, campaigning against the union of the Canadas. He was elected by acclamation.

In Parliament, Bertholot was opposed to the union, and was a consistent opponent of the policies of Governor-General Lord Sydenham. He was a member of the French-Canadian Group. He also voted in favour of the reform measures proposed by his son-in-law, LaFontaine, and the principles of responsible government.

He was re-elected in the general election of 1844 and remained in office until his death at Quebec City in 1847.

== Intellectual interests ==
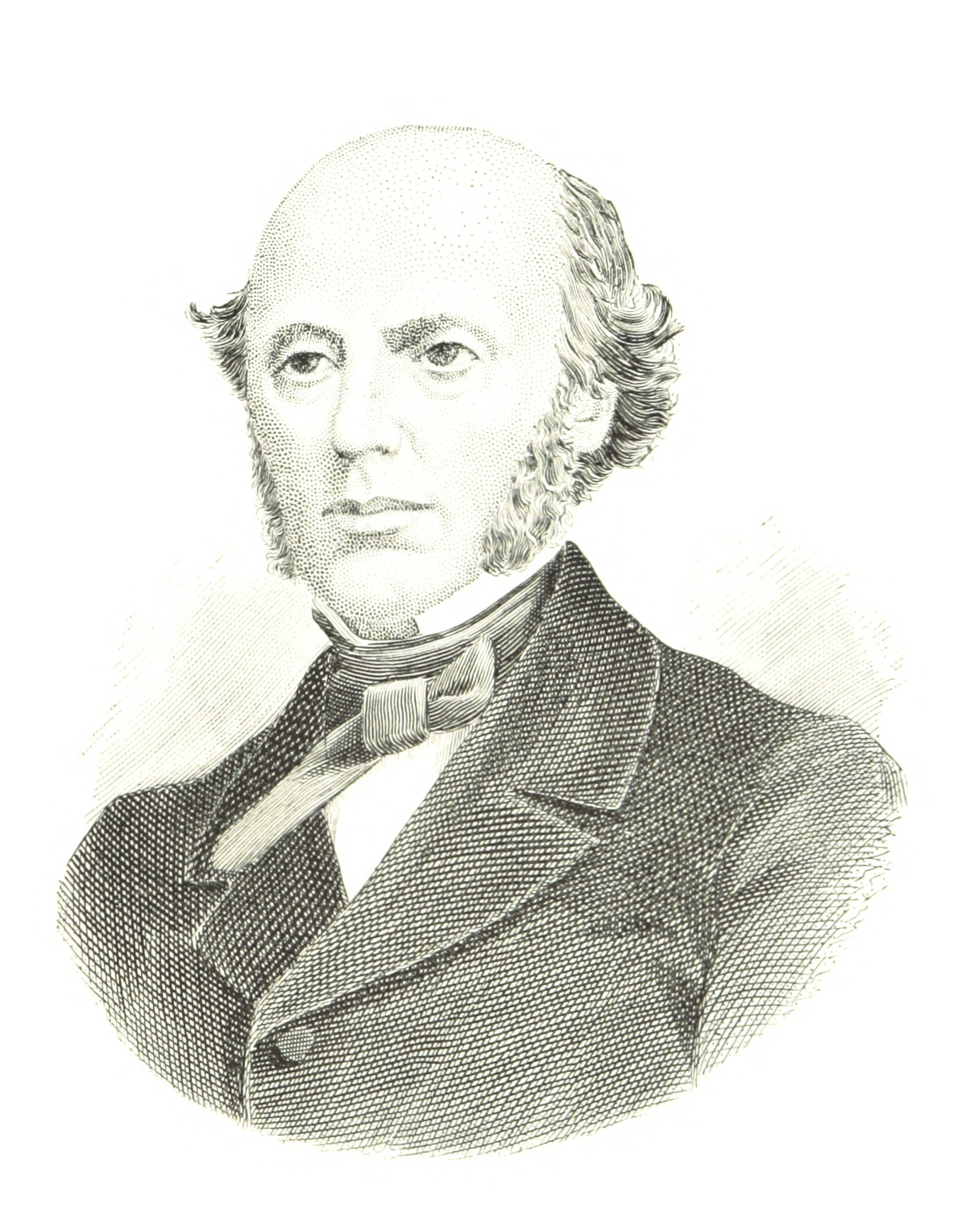
Noted historian François-Xavier Garneau, whom Berthelot mentored

Berthelot's main interests appear to have been intellectual in nature. He was a member of the Société littéraire et historique de Québec, and corresponded with intellectuals on the historical origins of New France. He published essays on French grammar, which attracted some attention, and a number of essays on the subject of historical archaeology. In his father's papers, he discovered an account of the American siege of Fort St. Jean during the American invasion of 1775, and ensured the document's preservation.

During his second trip to Paris, Berthelot made the acquaintance of François-Xavier Garneau. He gave his encouragement to the younger Garneau, who came to esteem the older Berthelot greatly. Berthelot later gave financial support for the publication of the first volume of Garneau's important work, Histoire du Canada depuis sa découverte jusqu'à nos jours, written in response to Durham's assertion that the people of Lower Canada were a "a people with no literature and no history." Garneau argued that the Canadiens had to struggle constantly against British attempts to assimilate them.

== Private life and adopted children ==
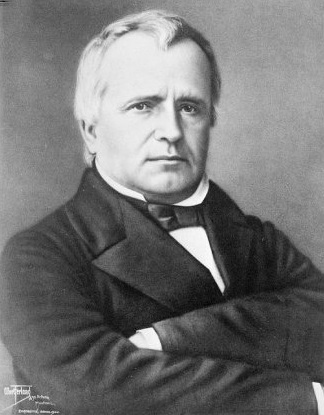
Louis-Hippolyte Lafontaine, Berthelot's son-in-law

Little is known of Berthelot's private life. He never married, and admitted to Garneau at one point in Paris that he was deeply lonely in his singleness. He adopted his daughter Adèle, born in 1813, and his son Amable, born in 1815. Nothing is known of their parentage or the circumstances of their adoption. Adèle married LaFontaine on July 9, 1831, while Amable fils practised medicine at Saint-Eustache, near Montreal.

One of his sisters, Geneviève Berthelot, was married to Joseph Badeaux, a notary who was native to Trois-Rivières. Badeaux was elected at various times to the Legislative Assembly, sometimes from Trois-Rivières.

== Death ==
Berthelot died in office in November, 1847. The Quebec bar formally went into mourning in his honour. Garneau referred to him in an article as "a studious man, rather than a man of action and change."

Berthelot was entombed at the Notre Dame des Neiges Cemetery in Montreal.

== Works ==
- Essai de grammaire française suivant les principes de l'abbé Girard (Quebec, 1840)
- Essai d'analyses grammaticales [...] (Quebec, 1843)
- Discours [...] sur le vaisseau [...] que l'on prétend être la "Petite-Hermine" [...] (Quebec, 1844)

== See also ==
1st Parliament of the Province of Canada
