= Ephraim Hart =

American merchant (1747–1825)

Ephraim Hart (1747 – July 16, 1825) was an American merchant who helped to organize the Board of Stock-Brokers, now known as the New York Stock Exchange.

== Biography ==
Hart was born to a Jewish family in Fürth, a city in the region of Franconia which lies now in Bavaria, Germany. Since 1440, a prospering Jewish community existed in Fürth. Hart's original surname was Hirz which he changed when he came to the United States.

By 1782, he was residing as a merchant in Philadelphia, and in that year he joined the Mickvé Israel congregation. In 1783, he married Frances Noah, sister of Manuel Noah, and their son was Joel Hart. Later, he moved to New York and engaged in the commission and brokerage business. On April 2, 1787, he was registered as an elector of the Shearith Israel congregation.

By 1792, he had become one of the most successful merchants in the City, and at this time he helped to organize the Board of Stock-Brokers, now known as the New York Stock Exchange, being one of the signatories of the Buttonwood Agreement of 1792 that founded the Exchange. His name also appears in 1799 in a "list of owners of houses and lots valued at £2,000 or more." He was one of the founders, in 1802, of the ebra Hesed Veemet, a charitable organization connected with the Shearith Israel congregation. He died in New York City and is buried at the Second Cemetery of Shearith Israel on 11th Street, near Avenue of the Americas (6th Avenue). His gravestone reads "Ephraim Hart / Pennsylvania / Pvt Capt Henry Graham's Co / Rev War / July 16, 1824"
