= Michel-Amable Berthelot Dartigny =

Canadian politician

Michel-Amable Berthelot Dartigny (August 10, 1738 – May 10, 1815) was a lawyer, judge, notary and political figure in Lower Canada.

He was born in the town of Quebec in 1738, the son of a Quebec merchant, and studied at the Petit Séminaire de Québec. He qualified to practise as a lawyer in 1771 and as a notary in 1773, setting up his practice at Quebec. He helped defend the town of Quebec against the American invasion of 1775–1776. In 1779, he helped found the Communauté des Avocats, an early lawyer's society in the province. Berthelot Dartigny was named judge of the Court of Common Pleas for Quebec district in 1791. He ran unsuccessfully for a seat in the Legislative Assembly of Lower Canada for Quebec County in 1792; he was declared elected in 1793 when Ignace-Michel-Louis-Antoine d'Irumberry de Salaberry chose to represent Dorchester in the assembly. He was elected to represent Kent in a 1798 by-election after the death of the previously-elected member, then elected in Quebec County in 1800 and 1804. Berthelot Dartigny opposed the bill which disallowed judges from sitting in the assembly.

He died at Quebec City in 1815.

His son Amable Berthelot was also a lawyer and a member of the legislative assembly.

A park and street in Quebec City were named Berthelot and another street was named D'Artigny after Michel-Amable Berthelot Dartigny.
