= Edward O'Hara (Canadian politician) =

Canadian politician

Edward O'Hara (c. 1767 – June 24, 1833) was a businessman, army officer and political figure in Lower Canada.

He was born in Gaspé, Quebec around 1767, the son of Felix O'Hara. He moved to Quebec City in the 1780s and, with Robert Woolsey, opened a store there which sold shoes, clothing and fabrics. O'Hara was elected to the Legislative Assembly of Lower Canada for Gaspé in 1792, with the support of merchant Charles Robin, and was reelected in 1796. In 1795, he was named a justice of the peace for the Gaspé district. In 1800, he joined the British Army, becoming lieutenant-colonel in 1813. He served in India and at the 1810 capture of Guadeloupe. In 1815, he was made a Companion of the Order of the Bath. He retired in 1822 and died near London, England in 1833.
