= Pierre-Amable de Bonne =

Canadian politician (1758–1816)

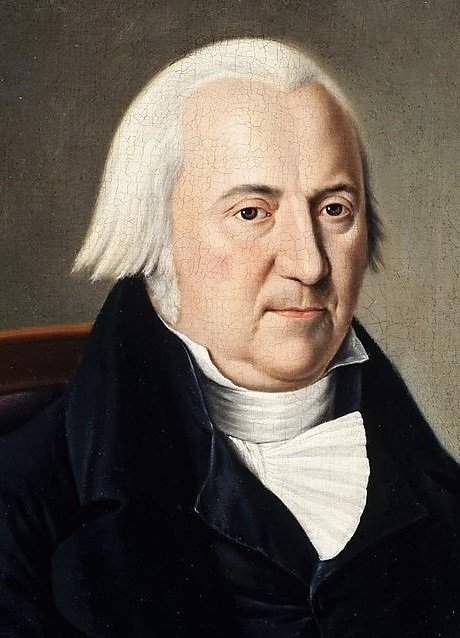
Pierre-Amable de Bonne, 1808

Pierre-Amable de Bonne (November 25, 1758 – September 6, 1816) was a seigneur, lawyer, judge and political figure in Lower Canada.

He was born in Montreal in 1758, the son of Louis de Bonne de Missègle (1717–1760), Chevalier de Saint-Louis, and studied at a college operated by the Sulpicians, then the Collège Saint-Raphaël and the Petit Séminaire de Québec. He served in the militia defending the town of Quebec during the siege by the Americans in 1775–6. He participated in the campaign at Lake Champlain, becoming lieutenant, and was taken prisoner in 1777 at the Battle of Saratoga. De Bonne continued to serve in the militia after this time, becoming colonel in 1809. He studied law at Montreal and qualified as a lawyer and notary in 1780.

De Bonne inherited the seigneury of Sault-Sainte-Marie from his father; he acquired additional properties over the years. In 1781, he married Louise, daughter of Michel Chartier de Lotbinière; they separated by mutual consent in 1782. In 1788, he was named a justice of the peace. De Bonne was a director of the Théâtre de Société, formed in Montreal in 1789. He was elected to the Legislative Assembly of Lower Canada for York in 1792; he was elected again in Trois-Rivières in 1796 and then again in 1800. He was then elected in Quebec County in 1804, 1808 and 1809. In the assembly, de Bonne was among those supporting the use of French as well as English by the assembly. In 1794, he was named to the Executive Council, serving until his death. De Bonne helped found the newspaper Le Courier de Québec, which opposed the Parti canadien.

In 1794, he was appointed judge in the Court of Common Pleas and in the Court of King's Bench for Quebec district. As a judge, he supported the continued use of French civil law. The Parti canadien on a number of occasions attempted to introduced legislation prohibiting judges from sitting in the legislature; this was in part aimed at de Bonne. In 1809, Lieutenant-governor James Henry Craig dissolved parliament as a result. In 1810, the assembly voted to declare his seat vacant. Again, the governor dissolved parliament. De Bonne retired as a judge in 1812.

In 1805, de Bonne had married again after his first wife died in 1802. He died at his estate in Beauport in 1816 and apparently left his estate to a relative. His second wife was unable to secure a pension from the government after de Bonne's death and committed suicide in a hospital for the insane in 1848.

Political offices
Preceded by Nicolas Saint-Martin, Parti Canadien; John Lees, Tory	MLA, District of Trois-Rivières; 1796–1804; With: John Lees, Tory	Succeeded by Louis-Charles Foucher, Tory; John Lees, Tory
