= Jean Desfossés =

Canadian politician

Jean Desfossés (November 1787 – April 21, 1854) was a merchant and political figure in Lower Canada. He represented Trois-Rivières in the Legislative Assembly of Lower Canada from 1833 to 1834.

He was born in Nicolet, Quebec, the son of Joseph Desfossés and Madeleine Boudreau. Around 1809, he entered business at Trois-Rivières. He served in the militia during the War of 1812; he became a lieutenant in 1825 but was stripped of his rank by Governor George Ramsay, was reinstated by Governor Matthew Whitworth-Aylmer and, in 1850, became lieutenant-colonel. Desfossés was elected to the legislative assembly in an 1833 by-election held after Charles Richard Ogden became attorney general. He supported the Parti patriote but did not vote for or against the Ninety-Two Resolutions. He was married twice: to Charlotte Miller in 1816 and to Angèle Ménéclier de Montrochon in 1822. Desfossés died at Trois-Rivières at the age of 64.

His granddaughter Marie-Louise-Elmire Guillet married Joseph-Adolphe Tessier.
