= John Lees (politician) =

Canadian politician

John Lees (ca 1740 – March 4, 1807) was a businessman, judge and political figure in Lower Canada.

He was born in Scotland around 1740 and came to the town of Quebec with his family around 1761. With Alexander Dawson, he formed a company in 1773 that was involved in importing goods and supplying the British Army; they also speculated in land. In 1774, he signed a petition requesting a legislative assembly for the province. Lees served in the militia during the siege of the town by the American army during the American Revolution. In 1787, his company acquired the lease for the Saint-Maurice ironworks at Trois-Rivières. In 1792, Lees was elected to the Legislative Assembly of Lower Canada for Trois-Rivières; he was reelected in 1796, 1800 and 1804. He was also an honorary member of the executive committee from 1794 to 1804, becoming an active member in 1804 and serving until his death. He was named storekeeper general for the Department of Indian Affairs at Lachine and a justice of the peace for the District of Quebec in 1795. In 1806, Lees was appointed a judge in the provincial Court of Appeals.

He died in Lachine in 1807.
