= 11th Parliament of Lower Canada =

Parliament of Lower Canada 1820–1824

The 11th Parliament of Lower Canada was in session from December 14, 1820, to July 6, 1824. Elections to the Legislative Assembly in Lower Canada had been held in July 1820. All sessions were held at Quebec City.

== Members ==
Riding	Member	First elected / previously elected	No. of terms
Bedford	John Jones (Note: election was declared invalid; Joseph Franchère was elected in a by-election held in March 1822.)	1809, 1820	2nd term*
Bedford	Joseph Franchère (1822)	1820, 1822	2nd term*
Buckinghamshire	Jean-Baptiste Proulx	1820	1st term
Buckinghamshire	Louis Bourdages	1804, (Note: Richelieu) 1815	8th term*
Cornwallis	Jean-Baptiste Taché	1820	2nd term
Cornwallis	Joseph Robitaille	1808	7th term
Devon	Jean-Baptiste Fortin	1820	2nd term
Devon	François Fournier	1814	4th term
Dorchester	John Davidson	1814	4th term
Dorchester	Louis Lagueux	1820	1st term
Effingham	Jacob Oldham (Note: died in June 1824)	1820	2nd term
Effingham	François Tassé	1820	2nd term
Gaspé	Jean-Thomas Taschereau	1809, 1820	7th term*
Hampshire	Charles Langevin	1820	2nd term
Hampshire	François Huot (Note: died in January 1822; Jean-Olivier Arcand was elected in a by-election held in March 1822.)	1796, 1808	9th term*
Hampshire	Jean-Olivier Arcand (1822)	1822	1st term
Hertford	François Blanchet	1809, 1818	6th term*
Hertford	François-Xavier Paré	1820	2nd term
Huntingdon	Michael O'Sullivan	1814	4th term
Huntingdon	Austin Cuvillier	1814	4th term
Kent	Frédéric-Auguste Quesnel	1820	1st term
Kent	Denis-Benjamin Viger	1808	7th term
Leinster	Jacques Trullier, dit Lacombe (Note: died in 1821; Jean-Marie Rochon was elected in a by-election held in January 1822.)	1814, 1816	4th term*
Leinster	Jean-Marie Rochon (1822)	1822	1st term
Leinster	Michel Prévost	1815, 1820	2nd term*
Montreal County	Joseph Valois	1820	2nd term
Montreal County	Joseph Perrault	1820	2nd term
Montreal East	Hugues Heney	1820	2nd term
Montreal East	Thomas Thain	1820	2nd term
Montreal West	Louis-Joseph Papineau	1808	7th term
Montreal West	George Garden	1820	2nd term
Northumberland	Étienne-Claude Lagueux	1816	3rd term
Northumberland	Philippe Panet	1816	3rd term
Orléans	François Quirouet	1820	2nd term
Quebec County	Louis Gauvreau (Note: died in 1822; Michel Clouet was elected in a by-election held in October 1822.)	1810	5th term
Quebec County	Michel Clouet (1822)	1822	1st term
Quebec County	John Neilson	1820	2nd term
Quebec (Lower Town)	Jean Bélanger	1820	1st term
Quebec (Lower Town)	James McCallum	1817, 1820	2nd term*
Quebec (Upper Town)	Andrew Stuart	1820	1st term
Quebec (Upper Town)	Joseph-Rémi Vallières de Saint-Réal	1820	2nd term
Richelieu	François Saint-Onge	1820	2nd term
Richelieu	Jean Dessaulles	1816	3rd term
Saint-Maurice	Louis Picotte	1820	2nd term
Saint-Maurice	Pierre Bureau	1819	3rd term
Surrey	Pierre Amiot	1813	5th term
Surrey	Étienne Duchesnois	1814	4th term
Trois-Rivières	Charles Richard Ogden	1814	4th term
Trois-Rivières	Joseph Badeaux	1808, 1820	4th term*
Warwick	Alexis Mousseau	1820	2nd term
Warwick	Jacques Deligny	1820	1st term
William-Henry	Robert Jones	1814	4th term
York	Nicolas-Eustache Lambert Dumont	1814	4th term
York	Augustin Perrault	1820	2nd term
