= 8th Parliament of Lower Canada =

Parliament of Lower Canada 1815–1816

The 8th Parliament of Lower Canada was in session from January 21, 1815, to February 29, 1816. Elections to the Legislative Assembly in Lower Canada had been held in March 1814. Colonial administrator Gordon Drummond dissolved the assembly in 1816 after it attempted to reintroduce charges against judges Jonathan Sewell and James Monk who had already been cleared of the same charges by the British Privy Council. All sessions were held at Quebec City.

== Members ==
Riding	Member	First elected / previously elected	No. of terms
Bedford	Henry Georgen	1814	1st term
Buckinghamshire	François Bellet	1810	2nd term
Buckinghamshire	James Stuart (Note: was elected in both Montreal County and Buckinghamshire; he chose to sit in the former and Louis Bourdages was elected in the latter in a by-election held in March 1815.)	1809, 1814	2nd term*
Buckinghamshire	Louis Bourdages (1815)	1804, (Note: Richelieu) 1815	5th term*
Cornwallis	Joseph Le Vasseur Borgia	1808	4th term
Cornwallis	Joseph Robitaille	1808	4th term
Devon	Joseph-François Couillard-Després	1814	1st term
Devon	François Fournier	1814	1st term
Dorchester	John Davidson	1814	1st term
Dorchester	Jean-Thomas Taschereau	1812	2nd term
Effingham	Joseph Malboeuf, dit Beausoleil	1810	2nd term
Effingham	Samuel Sherwood	1814	1st term
Gaspé	George Browne	1814	1st term
Hampshire	George Waters Allsopp	1814	1st term
Hampshire	François Huot	1796, 1808	6th term*
Hertford	François Blanchet	1809	3rd term
Hertford	Étienne-Ferréol Roy	1804	5th term
Huntingdon	Michael O'Sullivan	1814	1st term
Huntingdon	Austin Cuvillier	1814	1st term
Kent	Noël Breux	1814	1st term
Kent	Joseph Bresse	1814	1st term
Leinster	Jacques Trullier, dit Lacombe (Note: election was declared invalid; Michel Prévost was elected in a by-election held in June 1815.)	1814	1st term
Leinster	Michel Prévost (1815)	1815	1st term
Leinster	Denis-Benjamin Viger	1808	4th term
Montreal County	James Stuart	1808, (Note: Montreal East) 1811	3rd term*
Montreal County	Augustin Richer	1814	1st term
Montreal East	Jacques-Philippe Saveuse de Beaujeu	1814	1st term
Montreal East	George Platt	1814	1st term
Montreal West	Louis-Joseph Papineau	1808	4th term
Montreal West	James Fraser	1814	1st term
Northumberland	Étienne-Claude Lagueux	1814	1st term
Northumberland	Thomas Lee	1809	3rd term
Orléans	Charles Blouin	1810	2nd term
Quebec County	Louis Gauvreau	1810	2nd term
Quebec County	Pierre Brehaut	1814	1st term
Quebec (Lower Town)	Pierre Bruneau	1810	2nd term
Quebec (Lower Town)	Andrew Stuart	1814	1st term
Quebec (Upper Town)	Claude Dénéchau	1808	4th term
Quebec (Upper Town)	Jean-Antoine Panet (Note: named to the Legislative Council in January 1815; George Vanfelson was elected in a by-election held in February 1815.)	1792	8th term
Quebec (Upper Town)	George Vanfelson (1815)	1815	1st term
Richelieu	Séraphin Cherrier (1815) (Note: the 1814 election was declared invalid; a by-election was held in March 1815)	1815	1st term
Richelieu	François-Xavier Malhiot (1815)	1815	1st term
Saint-Maurice	Joseph-Rémi Vallières de Saint-Réal	1814	1st term
Saint-Maurice	Étienne Le Blanc	1814	1st term
Surrey	Pierre Amiot	1813	2nd term
Surrey	Étienne Duchesnois	1814	1st term
Trois-Rivières	Charles Richard Ogden	1814	1st term
Trois-Rivières	Amable Berthelot	1814	1st term
Warwick	Jacques Deligny	1814	1st term
Warwick	Ross Cuthbert	1800, 1812	6th term*
William-Henry	Robert Jones	1814	1st term
York	Nicolas-Eustache Lambert Dumont	1814	1st term
York	William Forbes (Note: died in November 1814; Jean-Baptiste Ferré was elected in a by-election held in March 1815.)	1814	1st term
York	Jean-Baptiste Ferré (1815)	1815	1st term
