= 10th Parliament of Lower Canada =

Parliament of Lower Canada 1820

The 10th Parliament of Lower Canada was in session from April 11, 1820, to April 24, 1820. Elections to the Legislative Assembly in Lower Canada had been held in March 1820. The legislature was dissolved due to the death of King George III. All sessions were held at Quebec City.

== Members ==
Riding	Member	First elected / previously elected	No. of terms
Bedford	Joseph Franchère	1820	1st term
Buckinghamshire	François Bellet	1810	4th term
Buckinghamshire	Louis Bourdages	1804, (Note: Richelieu) 1815	7th term*
Cornwallis	Jean-Baptiste Taché	1820	1st term
Cornwallis	Joseph Robitaille	1808	6th term
Devon	Jean-Baptiste Fortin	1820	1st term
Devon	François Fournier	1814	3rd term
Dorchester	John Davidson	1814	3rd term
Dorchester	Louis Lagueux	1820	1st term
Effingham	Jacob Oldham	1820	1st term
Effingham	François Tassé	1820	1st term
Gaspé (Note: return not received before close of session)			
Hampshire	Charles Langevin	1820	1st term
Hampshire	François Huot	1796, 1808	8th term*
Hertford	François Blanchet	1809, 1818	5th term*
Hertford	François-Xavier Paré	1820	1st term
Huntingdon	Michael O'Sullivan	1814	3rd term
Huntingdon	Austin Cuvillier	1814	3rd term
Kent	Pierre Bruneau (Note: died in April 1820)	1810	4th term
Kent	Denis-Benjamin Viger	1808	6th term
Leinster	Jacques Trullier, dit Lacombe	1814, 1816	3rd term*
Leinster	Barthélemy Joliette	1820	1st term
Montreal County	Joseph Valois	1820	1st term
Montreal County	Joseph Perrault	1820	1st term
Montreal East	Hugues Heney	1820	1st term
Montreal East	Thomas Busby	1820	1st term
Montreal West	Louis-Joseph Papineau	1808	6th term
Montreal West	George Garden	1820	1st term
Northumberland	Étienne-Claude Lagueux	1816	2nd term
Northumberland	Philippe Panet	1816	2nd term
Orléans	François Quirouet	1820	1st term
Quebec County	Louis Gauvreau	1810	4th term
Quebec County	John Neilson	1820	1st term
Quebec (Lower Town)	Thomas Lee	1820	1st term
Quebec (Lower Town)	Peter Burnet	1820	1st term
Quebec (Upper Town)	Claude Dénéchau	1808	6th term
Quebec (Upper Town)	Joseph-Rémi Vallières de Saint-Réal	1820	1st term
Richelieu	François Saint-Onge	1820	1st term
Richelieu	Jean Dessaulles	1816	2nd term
Saint-Maurice	Louis Picotte	1820	1st term
Saint-Maurice	Pierre Bureau	1819	2nd term
Surrey	Pierre Amiot	1813	4th term
Surrey	Étienne Duchesnois	1814	3rd term
Trois-Rivières	Charles Richard Ogden	1814	3rd term
Trois-Rivières	Marie-Joseph Godefroy de Tonnancour	1820	1st term
Warwick	Alexis Mousseau	1820	1st term
Warwick	Ross Cuthbert	1800, 1812, 1820	7th term*
William-Henry	Robert Jones	1814	3rd term
York	Nicolas-Eustache Lambert Dumont	1814	3rd term
York	Augustin Perrault	1820	1st term
