= 12th Parliament of Lower Canada =

Parliament of Lower Canada 1825–1827

The 12th Parliament of Lower Canada was in session from January 8, 1825, to July 5, 1827. Elections to the Legislative Assembly in Lower Canada had been held in July 1824. All sessions were held at Quebec City.

== Members ==
Riding	Member	First elected / previously elected	No. of terms
Bedford	Jean-Baptiste-René Hertel de Rouville	1824	1st term
Buckinghamshire	Jean-Baptiste Proulx	1820	2nd term
Buckinghamshire	Louis Bourdages	1804, (Note: Richelieu) 1815	9th term*
Cornwallis	Joseph Le Vasseur Borgia	1824	1st term
Cornwallis	Joseph Robitaille	1808	8th term
Devon	Jean-Baptiste Fortin	1820	3rd term
Devon	Joseph-François Couillard-Després	1824	1st term
Dorchester	John Davidson	1814	5th term
Dorchester	Louis Lagueux	1820	2nd term
Effingham	Joseph-Ovide Turgeon	1824	1st term
Effingham	Casimir-Amable Testard de Montigny	1824	1st term
Gaspé	Jean-Thomas Taschereau (Note: resigned seat to become a judge in March 1827)	1809, 1820	8th term*
Hampshire	John Cannon (Note: election was declared invalid in March 1826; François-Xavier Larue was elected in a by-election held in May 1826.)	1824	1st term
Hampshire	François-Xavier Larue (1826)	1826	1st term
Hampshire	François Drolet	1824	1st term
Hertford	François Blanchet	1809, 1818	7th term*
Hertford	Nicolas Boissonnault	1824	1st term
Huntingdon	Jean-Moïse Raymond	1824	1st term
Huntingdon	Austin Cuvillier	1814	5th term
Kent	Frédéric-Auguste Quesnel	1820	2nd term
Kent	Denis-Benjamin Viger	1808	8th term
Leinster	Charles Courteau	1824	1st term
Leinster	Jean-Marie Rochon	1822	2nd term
Montreal County	Joseph Valois	1820	3rd term
Montreal County	Joseph Perrault	1820	3rd term
Montreal East	Hugues Heney	1820	3rd term
Montreal East	James Leslie	1824	1st term
Montreal West	Louis-Joseph Papineau	1808	8th term
Montreal West	Pierre de Rastel de Rocheblave	1824	1st term
Northumberland	John Fraser	1824	1st term
Northumberland	Marc-Pascal de Sales Laterrière	1824	1st term
Orléans	François Quirouet	1820	3rd term
Quebec County	Michel Clouet	1822	2nd term
Quebec County	John Neilson	1820	3rd term
Quebec (Lower Town)	Jean Bélanger	1820	2nd term
Quebec (Lower Town)	Thomas Ainslie Young	1824	1st term
Quebec (Upper Town)	Andrew Stuart	1814, 1820, 1824	3rd term*
Quebec (Upper Town)	Joseph-Rémi Vallières de Saint-Réal	1820	3rd term
Richelieu	François-Roch de Saint-Ours	1824	1st term
Richelieu	Jean Dessaulles	1816	4th term
Saint-Maurice	Charles Caron	1824	1st term
Saint-Maurice	Pierre Bureau	1819	4th term
Surrey	Pierre Amiot	1813	5th term
Surrey	Aignan-Aimé Massue (Note: resigned his seat to allow Louis-Joseph Papineau to be elected)	1824	1st term
Surrey	Louis-Joseph Papineau (1827)	1808	8th term
Trois-Rivières	Étienne Ranvoyzé (Note: died in 1826; Charles Richard Ogden was elected in a by-election held in September 1826.)	1824	1st term
Trois-Rivières	Charles Richard Ogden (1826)	1814, 1826	5th term*
Trois-Rivières	Amable Berthelot	1814, 1824	2nd term*
Warwick	Louis-Marie-Raphaël Barbier	1824	1st term
Warwick	Jacques Deligny	1820	3rd term
William-Henry	Norman Fitzgerald Uniacke (Note: appointed judge in February 1825; James Stuart was elected in a by-election held later the same month.)	1824	1st term
William-Henry	James Stuart (1825)	1808, (Note: Montreal East) 1811, (Note: Montreal County) 1825	6th term*
York	Nicolas-Eustache Lambert Dumont	1814	5th term
York	John Simpson	1824	1st term
