= 9th Parliament of Lower Canada =

Parliament of Lower Canada 1817–1820

The 9th Parliament of Lower Canada was in session from January 15, 1817, to February 9, 1820. Elections to the Legislative Assembly in Lower Canada had been held in March 1816. All sessions were held at Quebec City.

== Members ==
Riding	Member	First elected / previously elected	No. of terms
Bedford	Thomas McCord	1809, (Note: Montreal West) 1816	2nd term*
Buckinghamshire	François Bellet	1810	3rd term
Buckinghamshire	Joseph Badeaux	1810, (Note: Trois-Rivières) 1816	2nd term*
Buckinghamshire	Louis Bourdages (1815)	1804, (Note: Richelieu) 1815	6th term*
Cornwallis	Joseph Le Vasseur Borgia	1808	5th term
Cornwallis	Joseph Robitaille	1808	5th term
Devon	Joseph-François Couillard-Després	1814	2nd term
Devon	François Fournier	1814	2nd term
Dorchester	John Davidson	1814	2nd term
Dorchester	Jean-Thomas Taschereau	1812	3rd term
Effingham	Joseph Malboeuf, dit Beausoleil	1810	3rd term
Effingham	Samuel Sherwood	1814	2nd term
Gaspé	James Cockburn (Note: died in August 1819)	1816	1st term
Hampshire	George Waters Allsopp	1814	2nd term
Hampshire	François Huot	1796, 1808	7th term*
Hertford	Louis Turgeon (Note: named to the Legislative Council in 1818; François Blanchet was elected in a by-election held in April 1818.)	1804, 1816	3rd term*
Hertford	François Blanchet (1818)	1809, 1818	4th term*
Hertford	Étienne-Ferréol Roy	1804	6th term
Huntingdon	Michael O'Sullivan	1814	2nd term
Huntingdon	Austin Cuvillier	1814	2nd term
Kent	Pierre Bruneau	1810	3rd term
Kent	Denis-Benjamin Viger	1808	5th term
Leinster	Jacques Trullier, dit Lacombe	1814, 1816	2nd term*
Leinster	Benjamin Beaupré	1816	1st term
Montreal County	James Stuart	1808, (Note: Montreal East) 1811	4th term*
Montreal County	Augustin Richer	1814	2nd term
Montreal East	John Molson	1816	1st term
Montreal East	Louis Roy Portelance	1804, 1816	5th term*
Montreal West	Louis-Joseph Papineau	1808	5th term
Montreal West	Félix Vinet, dit Souligny	1816	1st term
Northumberland	Étienne-Claude Lagueux	1816	1st term
Northumberland	Philippe Panet	1816	1st term
Orléans	Charles Blouin	1810	3rd term
Quebec County	Louis Gauvreau	1810	3rd term
Quebec County	Pierre Brehaut (Note: died in 1817; James McCallum was elected in a by-election in August 1817.)	1814	2nd term
Quebec County	James McCallum (1817) (Note: election was declared invalid, John Neilson was elected in a March 1818 by-election.)	1817	1st term
Quebec County	John Neilson (1818)	1818	1st term
Quebec (Lower Town)	François Languedoc	1816	1st term
Quebec (Lower Town)	Andrew Stuart	1814	2nd term
Quebec (Upper Town)	Claude Dénéchau	1808	5th term
Quebec (Upper Town)	George Vanfelson	1815	2nd term
Richelieu	Séraphin Cherrier	1815	2nd term
Richelieu	Jean Dessaulles	1816	1st term
Saint-Maurice	Louis Gugy (Note: named to the Legislative Council in 1818; Pierre Bureau was elected in a by-election held in March 1819.)	1816	1st term
Saint-Maurice	Pierre Bureau (1819)	1819	1st term
Saint-Maurice	Étienne Mayrand	1816	1st term
Surrey	Pierre Amiot	1813	3rd term
Surrey	Étienne Duchesnois	1814	2nd term
Trois-Rivières	Charles Richard Ogden	1814	2nd term
Trois-Rivières	Pierre Vézina	1816	1st term
Warwick	Jacques Deligny	1814	2nd term
Warwick	Joseph Bondy, dit Douaire	1816	1st term
William-Henry	Robert Jones	1814	2nd term
York	Nicolas-Eustache Lambert Dumont	1814	2nd term
York	Jean-Baptiste Ferré	1815	2nd term
