= 13th Parliament of Lower Canada =

Parliament of Lower Canada 1827–1830

The 13th Parliament of Lower Canada was in session from November 20, 1827, to September 2, 1830. Elections to the Legislative Assembly in Lower Canada had been held in July 1827. The legislature was dissolved in 1830 due to the death of King George IV. All sessions were held at Quebec City.

== Members ==
Riding	Member	First elected / previously elected	No. of terms
Bedford	Jean-Baptiste-René Hertel de Rouville	1824	2nd term
Buckinghamshire	Jean-Baptiste Proulx	1820	3rd term
Buckinghamshire	Louis Bourdages	1804, (Note: Richelieu) 1815	10th term*
Cornwallis	Joseph Le Vasseur Borgia	1824	2nd term
Cornwallis	Joseph Robitaille	1808	9th term
Devon	Jean-Baptiste Fortin	1820	4th term
Devon	Jean-Charles Létourneau	1827	1st term
Dorchester	Joseph Samson	1827	1st term
Dorchester	Louis Lagueux	1827	1st term
Drummond (Note: riding created in August 1829; formerly part of Buckinghamshire)	Frederick George Heriot (1829)	1829	1st term
Effingham	Joseph-Ovide Turgeon	1824	2nd term
Effingham	André Papineau	1827	1st term
Gaspé	Robert Christie (Note: expelled in February 1829; reelected in April 1829; expelled in January 1830)	1827	1st term
Hampshire	John Cannon	1824	2nd term
Hampshire	François-Xavier Larue	1826	2nd term
Hertford	François Blanchet (Note: died in June 1830)	1809, 1818	8th term*
Hertford	Nicolas Boissonnault	1824	2nd term
Huntingdon	Jean-Moïse Raymond	1824	2nd term
Huntingdon	Austin Cuvillier	1814	6th term
Kent	Frédéric-Auguste Quesnel	1820	3rd term
Kent	Denis-Benjamin Viger (Note: named to the Legislative Council in November 1829)	1808	9th term
Leinster	Julien Poirier	1827	1st term
Leinster	Laurent Leroux	1827	1st term
Missisquoi	Ralph Taylor (1829)	1829	1st term
Missisquoi	Richard Van Vliet Freligh (1829)	1829	1st term
Montreal County	Joseph Valois	1820	4th term
Montreal County	Joseph Perrault	1820	4th term
Montreal East	Hugues Heney	1820	4th term
Montreal East	James Leslie	1824	2nd term
Montreal West	Louis-Joseph Papineau (Note: Papineau was elected in both Montreal West and Surrey, choosing to represent the former in December 1828; François-Xavier Malhiot was elected in a by-election held in December 1828.)	1808	9th term
Montreal West	Robert Nelson	1827	1st term
Northumberland	Étienne-Claude Lagueux	1827	1st term
Northumberland	Marc-Pascal de Sales Laterrière	1824	2nd term
Orléans	François Quirouet	1820	4th term
Quebec County	Michel Clouet	1822	3rd term
Quebec County	John Neilson	1820	4th term
Quebec (Lower Town)	Jean Bélanger (Note: died in August 1827; Thomas Lee was elected in a by-election held in December 1828.)	1820	3rd term
Quebec (Lower Town)	Thomas Lee (1828)	1809, (Note: Northumberland) 1820, (Note: Quebec (Lower Town)) 1828	5th term*
Quebec (Lower Town)	Thomas Ainslie Young	1824	2nd term
Quebec (Upper Town)	Andrew Stuart	1814, 1820, 1824	4th term*
Quebec (Upper Town)	Joseph-Rémi Vallières de Saint-Réal (Note: resigned in May 1829 to accept an appointment as judge; Jean-François-Joseph Duval was elected in a by-election held in June 1829.)	1820	4th term
Quebec (Upper Town)	Jean-François-Joseph Duval (1829)	1829	1st term
Richelieu	François-Roch de Saint-Ours	1824	2nd term
Richelieu	Jean Dessaulles	1816	5th term
Saint-Maurice	Charles Caron	1824	2nd term
Saint-Maurice	Pierre Bureau	1819	5th term
Shefford	Lyman Knowlton (1829)	1829	1st term
Sherbrooke	Samuel Brooks (1829)	1829	1st term
Sherbrooke	Benjamin Tremain (1829)	1829	1st term
Stanstead	Ebenezer Peck (1829)	1829	1st term
Stanstead	Marcus Child (1829)	1829	1st term
Surrey	Pierre Amiot	1813	7th term
Surrey	Louis-Joseph Papineau	1808	9th term
Surrey	François-Xavier Malhiot (1828)	1815, (Note: Richelieu) 1828	2nd term*
Trois-Rivières	Charles Richard Ogden	1814, 1826	6th term*
Trois-Rivières	Pierre-Benjamin Dumoulin	1827	1st term
Warwick	Alexis Mousseau	1820, 1827	3rd term*
Warwick	Jacques Deligny	1820	4th term
William-Henry	Wolfred Nelson	1827	1st term
York	Jean-Baptiste Lefebvre (Note: died in August 1829; William Henry Scott was elected in October 1829.)	1827	1st term
York	William Henry Scott (1829)	1829	1st term
York	Jacques Labrie	1827	1st term
