= Parliament of Lower Canada =

Legislature of the Province of Lower Canada

Type
- Type: Bicameral
- Houses: Legislative Council; Legislative Assembly

History
- Founded: 1791
- Disbanded: 1838
- Preceded by: Council for the Affairs of the Province of Quebec
- Succeeded by: Special Council of Lower Canada

The Parliament of Lower Canada was the legislature for Lower Canada. It was created when the old Province of Québec was split into Lower Canada and Upper Canada in 1791.

As in other Westminster-style legislatures, it consisted of three components:

- The Queen of the United Kingdom of Great Britain and Ireland, represented by the Governor General of the Canadas (the Queen-in-Parliament)
- The Legislative Council of Lower Canada (the upper house)
- The Legislative Assembly of Lower Canada (the lower house)

As a result of the Lower Canada Rebellion of 1837, the Parliament of Lower Canada was dissolved and temporarily replaced by the Special Council of Lower Canada. Following the Lord Durham's 1839 Report to the British Government, Lower Canada was joined with Upper Canada to create the Province of Canada, and the Parliament of the Province of Canada was created to govern the two.

The Parliament was convened fifteen times in its history:

- 1st Parliament of Lower Canada 1791–1796
- 2nd Parliament of Lower Canada 1796–1800
- 3rd Parliament of Lower Canada 1800–1804
- 4th Parliament of Lower Canada 1804–1808
- 5th Parliament of Lower Canada 1808–1809
- 6th Parliament of Lower Canada 1809–1810
- 7th Parliament of Lower Canada 1810–1814
- 8th Parliament of Lower Canada 1814–1816
- 9th Parliament of Lower Canada 1816–1820
- 10th Parliament of Lower Canada April 1820
- 11th Parliament of Lower Canada 1820–1824
- 12th Parliament of Lower Canada 1824–1827
- 13th Parliament of Lower Canada 1827–1830
- 14th Parliament of Lower Canada 1830–1834
- 15th Parliament of Lower Canada 1834–1838
