= Laterrière =

Laterrière may refer to:

== Persons with the surname ==
- Pierre de Sales Laterrière (1747–1815), inspector and director of the Forges du Saint-Maurice and seigneur of Les Éboulements in New France (Canada)
- Pierre-Jean de Sales Laterrière (1789–1834), doctor and author
- Marc-Pascal de Sales Laterrière (1792–1872), doctor, seigneur and political figure

== Places ==
- Laterrière, Quebec, a sector of the Chicoutimi borough of the city of Saguenay, in Quebec, Canada
- Laterrière (Haïti), a rural establishment in the Chambellan commune of Arrondissement Jérémie in Grand'Anse department in Haïti
