= John Simpson (Lower Canada politician) =

Public official and politician in Lower Canada

Member of the Legislative Assembly of Lower Canada for York
- In office 1824–1827 Serving with Nicolas-Eustache Lambert Dumont
- Preceded by: Nicolas-Eustache Lambert Dumont; Augustin Perrault
- Succeeded by: Jacques Labrie; Jean-Baptiste Lefebvre

Member of the Legislative Assembly of the Province of Canada for Vaudreuil
- In office 1841–1844
- Preceded by: New position
- Succeeded by: Jacques-Philippe Lantier

Personal details
- Born: 1788 England
- Died: April 21, 1873 (aged 84–85) Kingston, Ontario
- Party: Lower Canada: Parti des bureaucrats Province of Canada: Unionist, "British" Tory
- Spouse: Zipporah Tickell
- Relations: John Arthur Roebuck (step-son)
- Children: 6 step-sons
- Occupation: Government official

John Simpson (1788 – April 21, 1873) was a government official and political figure in Lower Canada (now Quebec). Elected to the Legislative Assembly of Lower Canada in 1824, he supported Governor General Lord Dalhousie in his disputes with the Assembly over popular control of the provincial government. During the Lower Canada Rebellion he supported the government, but treated the Patriotes with generosity and respect. He recommended amnesty for most of the Patriotes, with exile to Bermuda for the leaders. Simpson served one term in the new Legislative Assembly of the Province of Canada, voting in favour of the union and again generally supporting the Governor General.

== Early life and family ==
Simpson was born in England in 1788. His wife, Zipporah Tickell, was the widow of Ebenezer Roebuck, a former British colonial administrator in India. Unsuccessful as a farmer and a merchant, in 1815 Simpson emigrated to Upper Canada (now Ontario) with his wife, and probably with all six of his step-sons. They initially settled in Augusta Township. In 1819, he became a private secretary for Lord Dalhousie, the Governor General of Lower Canada. In 1822, he was appointed customs inspector and overseer of His Majesty's locks at Coteau-du-Lac in Lower Canada. A port on the north shore of the River St. Lawrence, Coteau-du-Lac was west of Montreal, on the Coteau-du-Lac canal. Simpson received a commission in the local militia and was a churchwarden in the local protestant church.

== Lower Canada politics ==
In 1824, Simpson stood for election to the Legislative Assembly of Lower Canada. Although he had only been in the area for two years, Simpson had gained considerable popularity with the French-Canadian community in the district and was elected to the Assembly, representing York County. In the Assembly, he was a member of the Parti des bureaucrats, and a strong supporter of Dalhousie in his disputes with the elected Legislative Assembly. In the election of the Speaker of the Assembly which opened the first session, he voted unsuccessfully against Louis-Joseph Papineau, the leader of the French-Canadian nationalist party, the Parti canadien.

Simpson initially stood for re-election in 1827, but he withdrew before the poll. He had lost much of his political support, in part because of inflammatory comments he made about the Roman Catholic church. He feared electoral violence at the poll, which was not uncommon at that time.

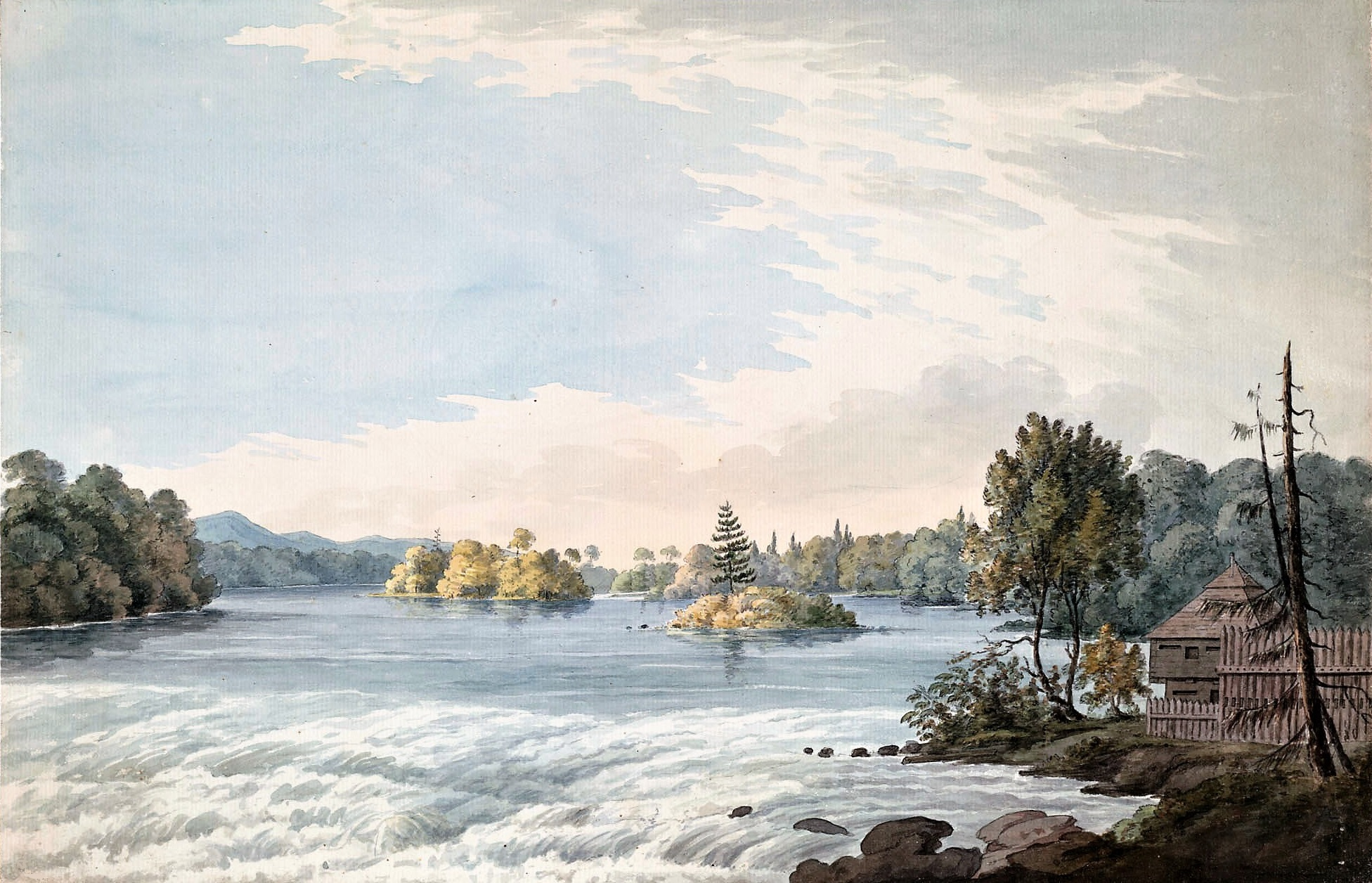
A wooden fort on rapids, believed to be Fort Coteau-du-Lac around 1791

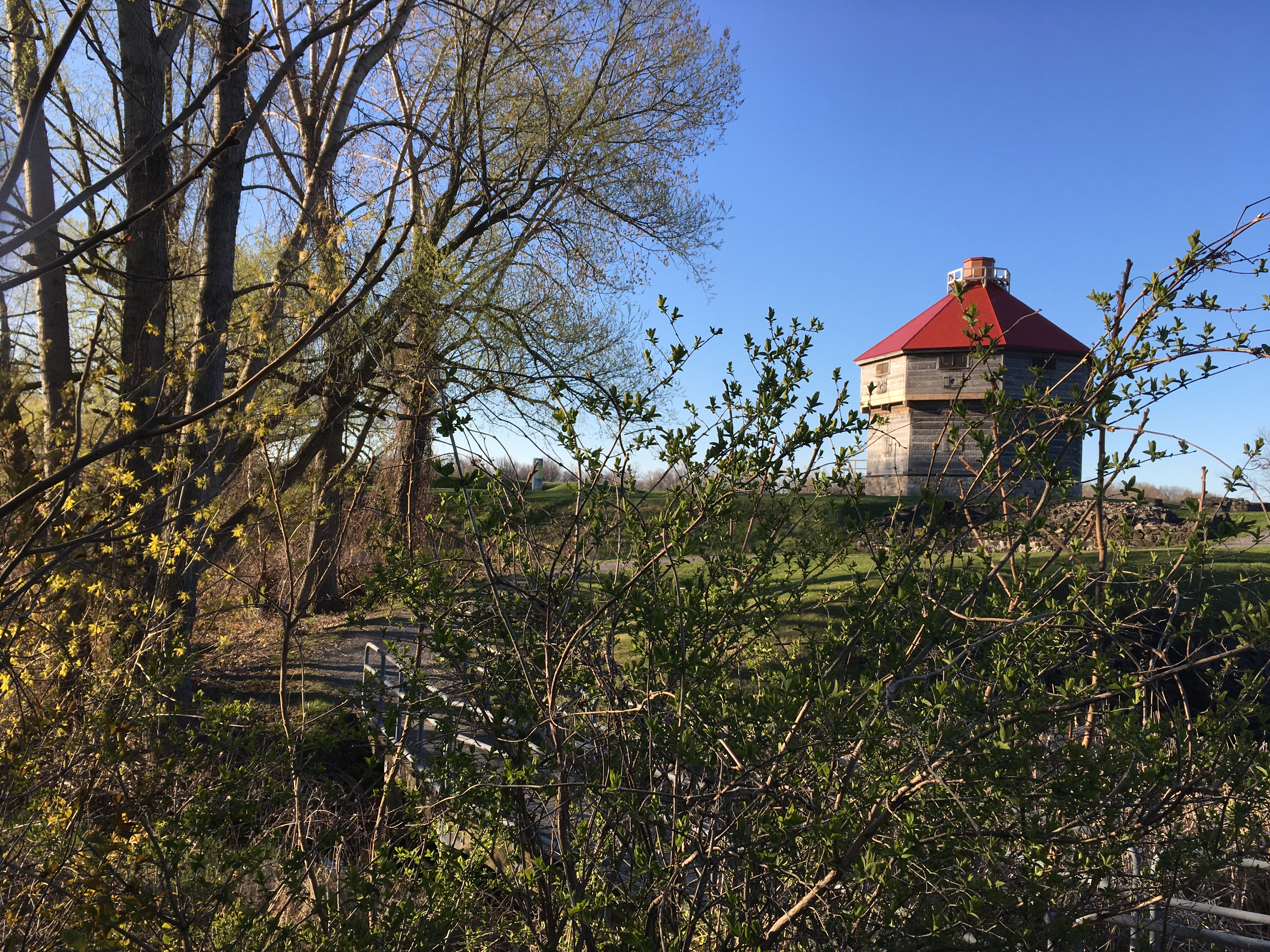
Fort Coteau-du-Lac today

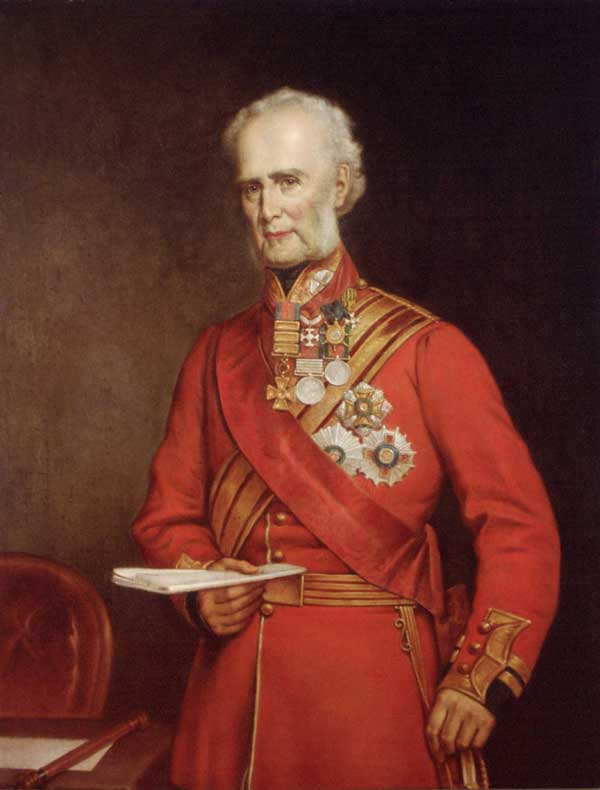
General Sir John Colborne, who thanked Simpson for keeping the fort from falling to the Patriotes

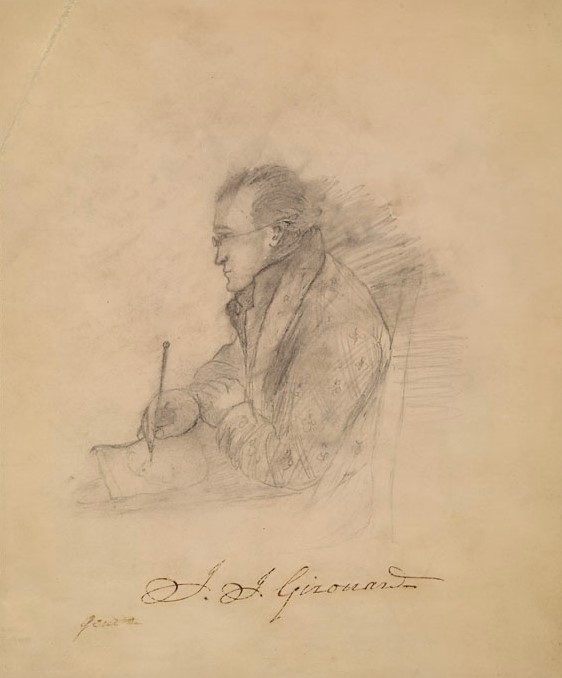
Jean-Joseph Girouard, who voluntarily surrendered to Simpson, praising his good treatment of French-Canadians in his area

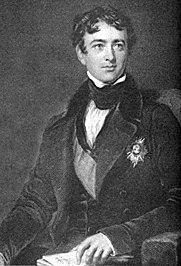
Lord Durham, who took Simpson's advice to exile Patriote leaders to Bermuda

During the heated politics of the 1830s, Simpson favoured the moderate reform cause, influenced in part by one of his step-sons, John Arthur Roebuck, who was the agent for the Lower Canada Assembly in Britain, and at some points was a member of the British House of Commons.

== Lower Canada Rebellion ==
On the outbreak of the Lower Canada Rebellion in 1837, Simpson organized volunteers from the area to prevent the fort at Coteau-du-Lac from falling into the hands of the Patriotes. He received formal thanks from Sir John Colborne, the interim governor general, for his actions.

At the same time, his fair treatment of those in arms was recognised by the Patriotes, to the point that one Patriote leader, Jean-Joseph Girouard, with a price on his head of £500, surrendered personally to Simpson on Christmas Day, 1837. Girouard publicly recognised Simpson for "the generous and prudent treatment of the persecuted Canadians which he ensured in his area."

Although he opposed the Rebellion, Simpson recommended amnesty for all political prisoners involved in the rebellion except the leaders, whom he proposed should be exiled, not tried and possibly hanged. The new governor general, Lord Durham, agreed with the proposal. To implement it, Simpson obtained signed confessions from eight of the Patriote leaders. Durham then issued orders exiling them to Bermuda. Simpson escorted the eight leaders from Montreal to Quebec, where they were to take ship for Bermuda. He paid for their meals himself. At his suggestion, Durham also arranged that they would be given freedom of movement in Bermuda. When the British government overturned Durham's order and pardoned the eight, Simpson sent them £100 to cover the expenses for their return to Lower Canada. When his generosity and care for the exiles became known, Simpson was criticised by the Montreal Herald as "a notoriously bad character", but he earned respect from French-Canadians.

== Province of Canada politics ==
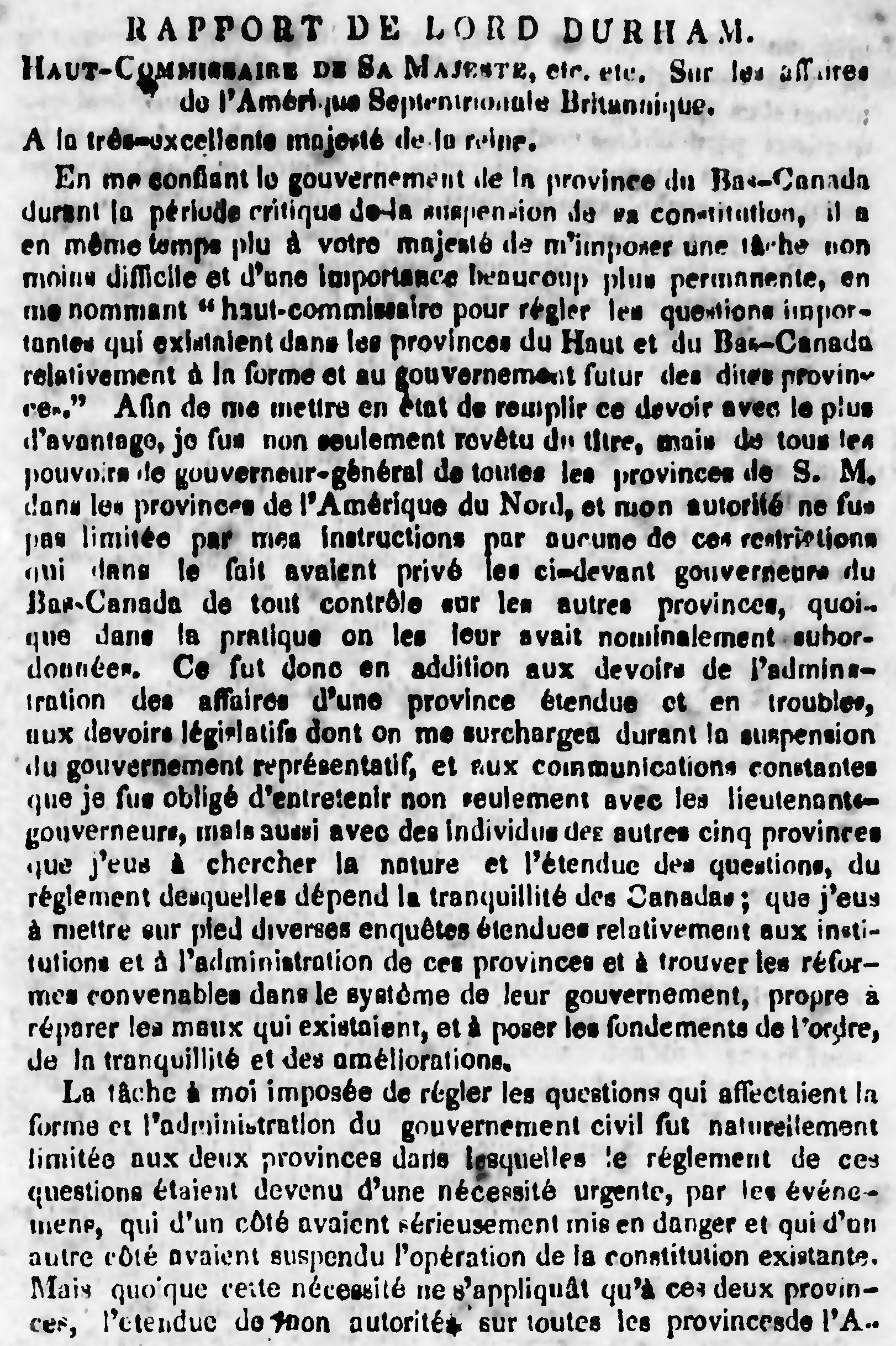
Lord Durham's Report, which recommended the union of the Canadas

Following the rebellion in Lower Canada, and the similar rebellion in 1837 in Upper Canada, the British government decided to merge the two provinces into a single province, as recommended by Lord Durham in the Durham Report. The Union Act, 1840, passed by the British Parliament, abolished the two provinces and their separate parliaments. It created the Province of Canada, with a single Parliament for the entire province, composed of an elected Legislative Assembly and an appointed Legislative Council. The Governor General initially retained a strong position in the government.

Simpson again tried his hand at politics. In the elections for the new Parliament in 1841, Simpson was elected to the Legislative Assembly of the Province of Canada for Vaudreuil, a riding which covered some of the same territory as his previous riding of York. He campaigned in favour of the union, and defeated an anti-union candidate, André Jobin. This time, it was Simpson's supporters who used electoral violence; at one point Jobin had to jump out of a window to escape them.

In the first session of the new Assembly, the union of the Canadas was one of the major issues. John Neilson, a leader of the French-Canadian Group, introduced a motion condemning the way the union had been imposed on Lower Canada. Simpson supported the union and voted against the motion, which was defeated. However, he was also a co-sponsor of a motion calling for the inclusion of French-Canadian members in the government; at the time, only English-speaking Canadians were members of the Executive Council. Simpson had some reform tendencies, but he generally supported the Governor General during the Parliament.

After surrendering to Simpson during the Rebellion, Girouard had been imprisoned without trial for several months. On his release, he had withdrawn from politics. In 1842, Simpson was part of a delegation of members of the Assembly who approached Girouard and urged him to re-enter politics, but Girouard declined.

In the major dispute over responsible government in the 1843 session, Simpson voted in support of the Governor General, and opposed the position of Louis-Hippolyte LaFontaine and Robert Baldwin.

Simpson did not stand for re-election in 1844. In 1845 he was appointed to the Rebellion Losses Commission, set up to assess claims for compensation by individuals whose property had been damaged in the rebellions. When the Commission wrapped up in 1851, his work on the Commission was the target of criticism from the Montreal Gazette.

== Later life and death ==
Simpson retired to Brockville where his son was customs collector. He later died in Kingston in 1873.

His stepson, John Arthur Roebuck, summed up Simpson: "He was a daring and sanguine man and indulged in schemes that would have terrified a more sober-minded one."

== See also ==
- 1st Parliament of the Province of Canada
