= Pélissier =

Pélissier or Pelissier is a French surname. Notable people with the surname include:

- Aimable Pélissier (1794–1864), 1st Duc de Malakoff, Marshal of France
- Anthony Pelissier (1912–1988), British film director and producer
- Charles Pélissier (1903–1959), French cyclist
- Christophe Pélissier:
  - Christophe Pélissier (1728–1779), French businessman
  - Christophe Pélissier (born 1965), French football player and manager
- Éloi Pélissier (born 1991), French rugby player
- Francis Pélissier (1894–1959), French cyclist
- H. G. Pelissier (1874–1913), British theatre producer
- Henri Pélissier (1889–1935), French cyclist
- Marie Pélissier (1706/7–1749), French singer
- Matt Pelissier, American rock drummer
- Olympe Pélissier (died 1878), salon hostess and second wife of Rossini
- Philippe Pélissier (born 1947), French figure skater
- René Pelissier (1886–1969), French flying ace
