= Thomas Ainslie =

Thomas Ainslie may refer to:

- Thomas Ainslie (rugby union) (1860–1926), Scottish rugby union player
- Thomas Ainslie (colonial official) (1729–1806), Scottish colonial official

== See also ==
- Thomas Ainslie Young, political figure in Lower Canada
