= George Garden =

George Garden may refer to:

- George Garden (politician)
- George Garden (minister)
