= Breux =

Breux may refer to several communes in France:

- Breux, Meuse, in the Meuse département
- Breux-Jouy, in the Essonne département
- Breux-sur-Avre, in the Eure département

== See also ==
- Noël Breux (1773–1861), politician in Lower Canada
