= James Cockburn =

James Cockburn may refer to:

- James Cockburn of Skirling, supporter of Mary, Queen of Scots
- Sir James Cockburn, 8th Baronet (1729–1804), Scottish politician
- Sir James Cockburn, 9th Baronet (1771–1852), Scottish soldier
- James Cockburn (cricketer) (1916–1990), Australian cricketer
- James Cockburn (Ontario politician) (1819–1883), Canadian politician in early 19th century Canada
- James Cockburn (Lower Canada politician) (c. 1763–1819), physician and politician in Lower Canada
- James Cockburn (minister) (1882–1973), Scottish clergyman and scholar
- James Cockburn (Royal Navy officer) (1817–1872), Commander-in-Chief, East Indies Station
- James Pattison Cockburn (1779–1847), artist, author and military officer

== See also ==
- James Coburn (disambiguation)
