= James Fisher (physician) =

Canadian physician and politician

James Fisher (before 1776 – June 26, 1822) was a medical doctor and political figure in Lower Canada.

He was probably born in Scotland and came to the Province of Quebec in 1776 as an aide at the military hospital at Quebec City. In 1783, he was named garrison surgeon. In 1787, he proposed that a medical board be set up to qualify physicians and surgeons to practice in the province; Fisher served on the first such board when it was set up the following year. In 1789, he was named a doctor at the Hôpital Général at Quebec. He was elected to the Legislative Assembly of Lower Canada for Northumberland County in 1796. Fisher was named physician for the Ursulines of Quebec in 1807 and commissioner for insane asylums in 1814. In 1815, he retired from the military and, in 1816, returned to Scotland.

He died in Edinburgh in 1822.

A number of well-reputed early physicians in Lower Canada were trained by Fisher:

- François Blanchet
- John McLoughlin
- Joseph Painchaud
- Anthony von Iffland
