= Robert Jones (Canada East politician) =

Politician in Lower Canada and the Province of Canada

Member of the Legislative Council of Lower Canada
- In office August 2, 1832 – March 27, 1838

Member of the Legislative Assembly of the Province of Canada for Missiskoui
- In office 1841–1844
- Preceded by: New position
- Succeeded by: James Smith

Member of the Legislative Council of the Province of Canada
- In office January 16, 1849 – May 22, 1850

Personal details
- Born: c. 1793 William Henry, Lower Canada (now Sorel-Tracy, Quebec)
- Died: January 21, 1874 (around 80 years old)
- Party: Unionist; British Tory
- Relations: John Jones (father); Robert Jones (uncle)

Robert Jones (c. 1793 – January 21, 1874) was a political figure in Canada East, in the Province of Canada. He represented Missiskoui in the Legislative Assembly of the Province of Canada from 1841 to 1844. He also served as a member of the Legislative Council of Lower Canada from 1832 to 1838 and the Legislative Council of the Province of Canada from 1849 to 1850.

Little is known about his life. He was born in William-Henry, Lower Canada (now Sorel-Tracy, Quebec, probably the son of John Jones and Marie-Magdelaine Heney. It is not known if he was married.

At various times, Jones lived in the towns of Saint-Jean and Christieville, in Stanbridge Township.

In the general election of 1830, Jones was a candidate for the seat of Missiskoui in the Legislative Assembly of Lower Canada, but was defeated. Two years later, the Governor of Lower Canada appointed him to the Legislative Council of Lower Canada. He held the position until the British government suspended the constitution of Lower Canada in 1838, following the Lower Canada Rebellion.

As a result of the Lower Canada rebellion and the similar rebellion in 1837 in Upper Canada (now Ontario), the British government decided to merge the two provinces into a single province, as recommended by Lord Durham in the Durham Report. The Union Act, 1840, passed by the British Parliament, abolished the two provinces and their separate parliaments, and created the Province of Canada, with a single parliament for the entire province, composed of an elected Legislative Assembly and an appointed Legislative Council. The Governor General retained a strong position in the government.

The first general election for the Legislative Assembly of the Province of Canada was held in 1841. Jones again stood for election in Missiskoui, and this time he was elected, as a supporter of the union of the Canadas and the government of Governor General Lord Sydenham. In the Assembly, he generally voted with the British Tory group from Lower Canada, supporting the governor.

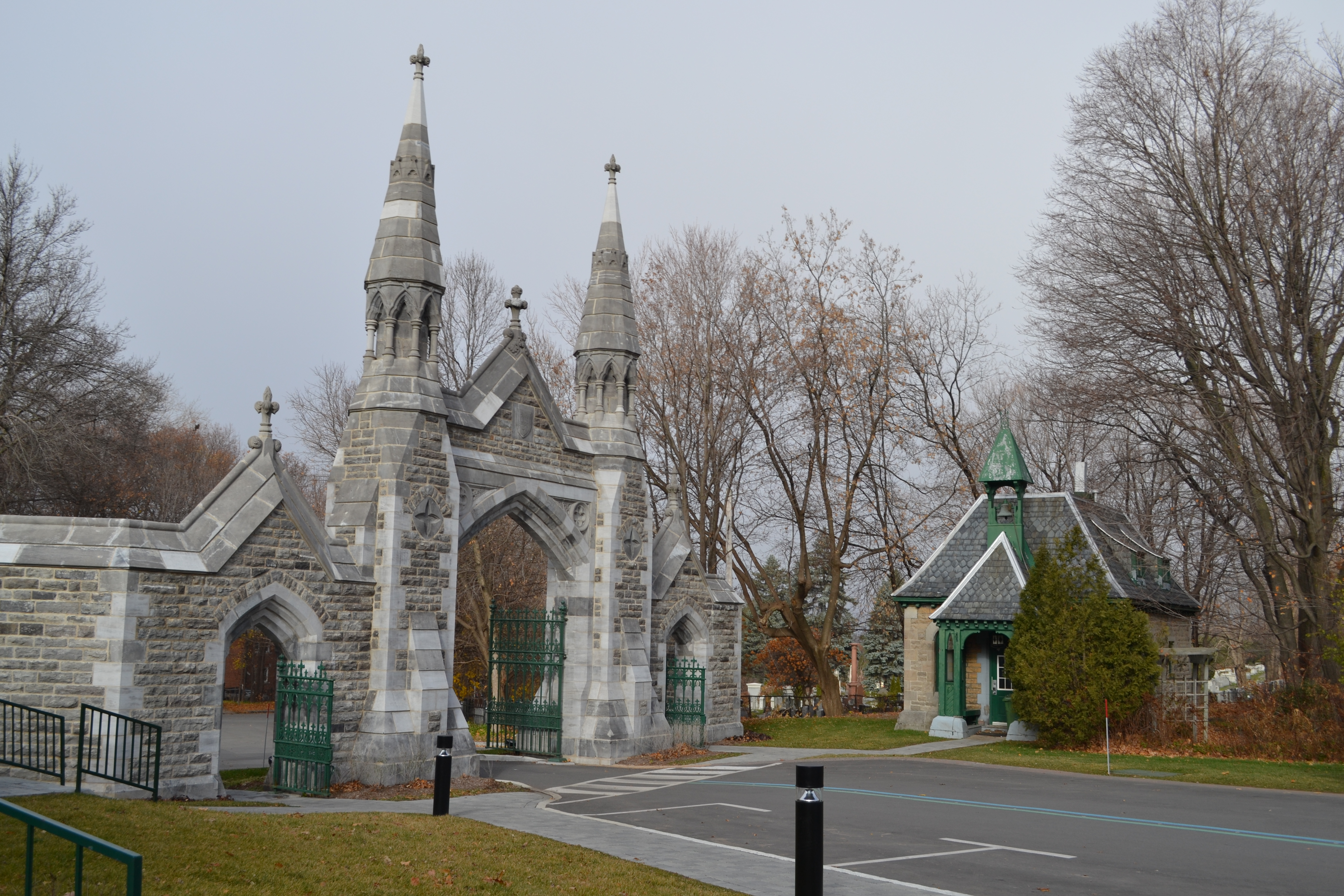
Gate to Mount Royal Cemetery, Montreal, where Jones is buried

Jones did not run for reelection to the Assembly in 1844. In 1849, the governor appointed him to the Legislative Council, but he resigned his seat in 1850. The governor announced the resignation to the Council in May, 1850.

He died in Montreal in 1874, aged about 80. After a funeral in St. George's Anglican Church, he was buried in Mount Royal Cemetery.

== See also ==
1st Parliament of the Province of Canada
