= Missiskoui (Province of Canada electoral district) =

Electoral district in former Province of Canada

Province of Canada electoral district

Defunct pre-Confederation electoral district
- Legislature: Legislative Assembly of the Province of Canada
- District created: 1841
- District abolished: 1867
- First contested: 1841
- Last contested: 1863

Missiskoui was an electoral district of the Legislative Assembly of the Parliament of the Province of Canada, in Canada East, in the Eastern Townships. It was created in 1841 and was based on the previous electoral district of the same name for the Legislative Assembly of Lower Canada. It was represented by one member in the Legislative Assembly.

The electoral district was abolished in 1867, upon the creation of Canada and the province of Quebec.

== Boundaries ==
The Union Act, 1840 merged the two provinces of Upper Canada and Lower Canada into the Province of Canada, with a single Parliament. The separate parliaments of Lower Canada and Upper Canada were abolished.

The Union Act provided that the pre-existing electoral boundaries of Lower Canada and Upper Canada would continue to be used in the new Parliament, unless altered by the Union Act itself. The Missiskoui electoral district of Lower Canada was not altered by the Act, and therefore continued with the same boundaries which had been set by a statute of Lower Canada in 1829:

The County of Missiskoui shall contain the Townships of Sutton, the Seigniory of Saint Armand, and the Townships of Dunham and Stanbridge, together with all the gores and augmentations of the said Townships.

Missisikoui was located in the Eastern Townships (now the Estrie region).

== Members of the Legislative Assembly ==
Missisikoui was a single-member constituency.

The following were the members of the Legislative Assembly from Missiskoui. "Party" was a fluid concept, especially during the early years of the Province of Canada. Party affiliations are based on the biographies of individual members given by the National Assembly of Quebec, as well as votes in the Legislative Assembly.

| Parliament | Member | Years in Office | Party |
|---|---|---|---|
| 1st Parliament; 1841–1844 | Robert Jones | 1841–1844 | Tory |

== Abolition ==
The district was abolished on July 1, 1867, when the British North America Act, 1867 came into force, splitting the Province of Canada into Quebec and Ontario. It was succeeded by electoral districts of the same name in the House of Commons of Canada and the Legislative Assembly of Quebec.
