= Christophe Pélissier =

Christophe Pélissier may refer to:

- Christophe Pélissier (businessman) (1728–1779), French businessman
- Christophe Pélissier (footballer) (born 1965), French manager and former footballer
