= Charles Bégin =

Canadian politician

Charles Bégin (May 5, 1736 – November 4, 1802) was a political figure in Lower Canada. He represented Dorchester in the Legislative Assembly of Lower Canada from 1796 to 1800.

He was born Charles-Louis Bégin in Pointe-Lévy, the son of Jacques Bégin and Geneviève Rocheron. Bégin was a farmer and inn-keeper at Pointe-Lévy. In 1761, he married Louise Samson. He served as bailiff from 1772 to 1774. In 1781, he was given the rank of captain in the militia. Bégin settled at Quebec City. He did not run for reelection in 1800. He died in Quebec City at the age of 66.

His grandson Louis Lagueux and his nephew Joseph Samson also served in the assembly.
