= James Coburn (disambiguation) =

James Coburn (1928–2002) was an American actor and director

James Coburn may also refer to:

- James Coburn (criminal) (1926–1964), last person to be executed in the United States for a crime other than murder
- Jim Coburn (born 1944), American politician, 2006 republican nominee for Governor of New Hampshire
- James Coburn (Irish politician) (1889–1953), Irish National League / Independent / Fine Gael politician from Louth

== See also ==
- James Cockburn (disambiguation) (pronounced James Coburn)
