= John Young (seigneur) =

Canadian businessman and politician (1759–1819)

- Born: c. 1759
- Died: September 14, 1819; Quebec City
- Occupation: Seigneur
- Known for: Businessman, judge, and political figure
- Spouse: Christian Ainslie (married 1795)
- Children: 5: Catherine Ainslie Young; Thomas Ainslie Young; Elizabeth Ainslie Young; Gilbert Ainslie Young; Matilda Young

John Young (c. 1759 – September 14, 1819) was a seigneur, businessman, judge, and political figure in Lower Canada. He was a member of the Legislative Assembly of Quebec from June 1792 until his death.

== Birth ==
John Young may have been born in Scotland around 1759. Y-DNA testing of his descendants also suggest Scottish origins.

== Early life ==
Nothing is known of his childhood.

== Marriage ==
In 1795, at the Cathedral Holy Trinity in Québec, John Young married Christian Ainslie, daughter of Thomas Ainslie, businessman, office holder, and militia officer. They had five children together including Thomas Ainslie young and Gilbert Ainslie Young who both make notable contributions to Québec society.

== Life ==
He became a merchant in London and came to Quebec City in 1783 to collect debts from a bankrupt firm there on behalf of firms from London and Glasgow. He entered business there in wholesale and retail sales. The firm expanding rapidly, acquiring ships to transport their goods. It became part owner of Thomas Grant and Company, a distiller, in 1791. In 1787, Young acquired the seigneury of Vitré. Young's firm purchased part of the seigneury of Beauport in 1792.

In 1792, he was elected to the 1st Parliament of Lower Canada for the Lower Town of Quebec and served until 1808. Young served in the local militia and became lieutenant in 1794. He was also named to the Executive Council in 1794. In the same year, Thomas Ainslie joined Young's firm as a partner. In 1795, Young married Christian (Christiana), Ainslie's daughter. Young acquired Dorset Township, Lower Canada, near Saint-Hilaire-de-Dorset, in 1799 and later sold it to Simon McTavish. He was a director and later president of the Quebec Fire Society. In 1805, Young introduced a bill in the assembly which created Trinity House of Quebec with the aim of improving navigation on the Saint Lawrence River. He was its first master and served in that post until 1812. Young helped found the Union Company of Quebec in 1805 that operated the Union Hotel at Quebec. He also served as a justice of the peace and a judge in the Court of Appeals.

Young's company took advantage of borrowed money to finance its rapid expansion and, later in life, he found it more difficult to deal with his debts. Also, he was not always able to collect money owed to the company. The properties at Beauport were sold to cover debts. However, the household continued to live in the fashion to which it had become accustomed although in rented quarters. Young died at Quebec City in 1819.

His son Thomas Ainslie Young also served in the Legislative Assembly and was named controller of customs at Quebec.
