= Vaudreuil (Province of Canada electoral district) =

Electoral district in former Province of Canada

Vaudreuil Canada East
Province of Canada electoral district

Defunct pre-Confederation electoral district
- Legislature: Legislative Assembly of the Province of Canada
- District created: 1841
- District abolished: 1867
- First contested: 1841
- Last contested: 1863

Vaudreuil was an electoral district of the Legislative Assembly of the Parliament of the Province of Canada, in Canada East, west of Montreal. It was created in 1841, based on the previous electoral district of the same name for the Legislative Assembly of Lower Canada.

Vaudreuil was represented by one member in the Legislative Assembly. It was abolished in 1867, upon the creation of Canada and the province of Quebec.

== Boundaries ==
Vaudreuil electoral district was located west of Montreal, between the Saint Lawrence River to the south and the Ottawa River to the north, bordering on Canada West (now in Vaudreuil-Soulanges Regional County Municipality).

The Union Act, 1840 merged the two provinces of Upper Canada and Lower Canada into the Province of Canada, with a single Parliament. The separate parliaments of Lower Canada and Upper Canada were abolished. The Union Act provided that the pre-existing electoral boundaries of Lower Canada and Upper Canada would continue to be used in the new Parliament, unless altered by the Union Act itself.

The Lower Canada electoral district of Vaudreuil was not altered by the Act. It was therefore continued with the same boundaries in the new Parliament. Those boundaries had been set by a statute of Lower Canada in 1829:

The County of Vaudreuil shall be bounded on the north and east by the River Ottawa, on the south and south east by the River Saint Lawrence, and on the south west and west by the boundary line separating that part of Lower-Canada, and Upper-Canada situate between the Saint Lawrence and the Ottawa, and shall include the Isle Perrot, and all the Islands in the said Grand or Ottawa River and in the River Saint Lawrence, nearest to the said County, and in the whole or in part fronting the same; which County so bounded, comprises the Seigniories of Vaudreuil, Rigaud, Soulanges and New Longueuil and the Township of Newton.

== Map of Vaudreuil ==
The seigniories which composed Vaudreuil electoral district were as follows:

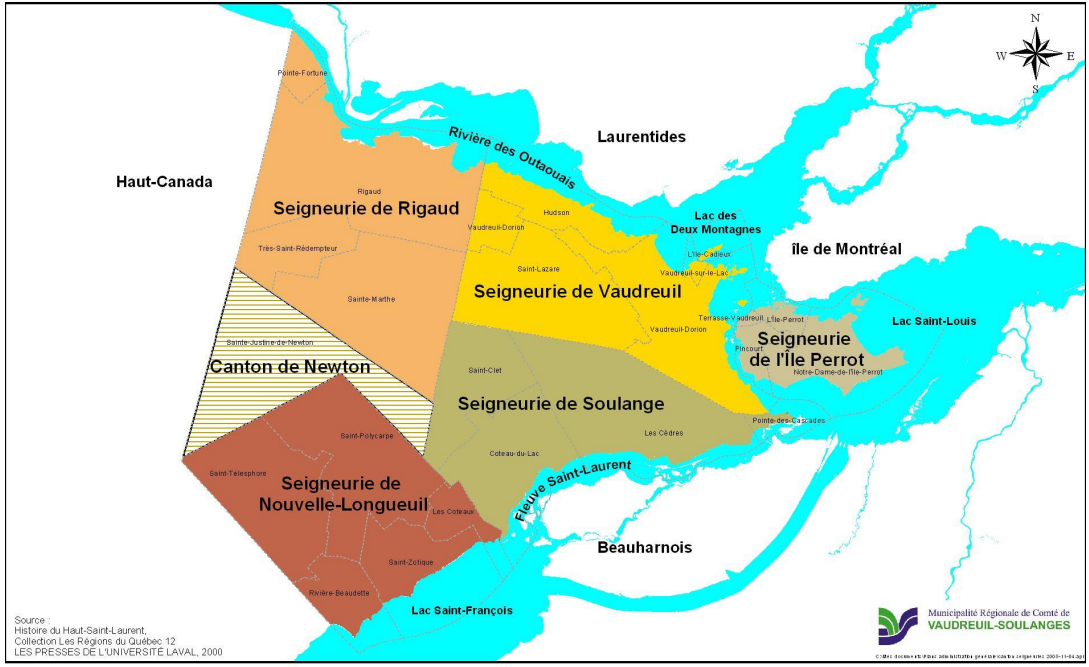

== Members of the Legislative Assembly (1841–1867) ==
Vaudreuil was a single-member constituency.

The following were the members of the Legislative Assembly for Vaudreuil. The party affiliations are based on the biographies of individual members given by the National Assembly of Quebec, as well as votes in the Legislative Assembly. "Party" was a fluid concept, especially during the early years of the Province of Canada.

Parliament	Member	Years in Office	Party
1st Parliament; 1841–1844	John Simpson	1841–1844	Unionist; "British" Tory
2nd Parliament; 1844–1847	Jacques-Philippe Lantier	1844–1847	French-Canadian Group
3rd Parliament; 1848–1851	Jean-Baptiste Mongenais	1848–1857	French-Canadian Group
4th Parliament; 1851–1854	Jean-Baptiste Mongenais	1848–1857	Ministerialist
5th Parliament; 1854–1857	Jean-Baptiste Mongenais	1848–1857	Bleu
6th Parliament; 1858–1861	Robert Unwin Harwood (Note: Resigned seat, October 3, 1860, to stand for election to the Legislative Council: J.O. Côté, Political Appointments and Elections in the Province of Canada from 1841 to 1865, 2nd ed. (Ottawa: G.E. Desbarats, 1865), p. 114.)	1858–1860	Conservative
6th Parliament; 1858–1861	Jean-Baptiste Mongenais (Note: Elected in by-election, November 26, 1860: Côté, Political Appointments and Elections, 2nd ed., p. 114.)	1860–1861 (By-election)	Bleu
7th Parliament; 1861–1863	Jean-Baptiste Mongenais	1861–1863	Bleu
8th Parliament; 1863–1867	Antoine Chartier de Lotbinière Harwood	1863–1867	Confederation; Conservative

== Abolition ==
The district was abolished on July 1, 1867, when the British North America Act, 1867 came into force, creating Canada and splitting the Province of Canada into Quebec and Ontario. It was succeeded by electoral districts of the same name in the House of Commons of Canada and the Legislative Assembly of Quebec.

== See also ==
- List of elections in the Province of Canada
