= Hector-Simon Huot =

Canadian politician

Hector-Simon Huot (January 16, 1803 – June 25, 1846) was a lawyer and politician in Lower Canada.

He was born at Quebec City in 1803, the son of merchant François Huot, and studied at the Petit Séminaire de Québec. He articled in law with Louis Lagueux, was called to the bar in 1825 and set up practice at Quebec City. With others, Huot helped reestablish the newspaper Le Canadien in 1830. In 1830, he was elected to represent Portneuf in the Legislative Assembly of Lower Canada and was reelected in 1834. Although Huot supported constitutional reform and signed the Ninety-Two Resolutions, he did not support the use of force, and he retired from provincial politics after the Lower Canada Rebellion. He lobbied against the proposed union of Upper Canada and Lower Canada in 1840. During his time in office, he was chair of a committee that studied education in Lower Canada and introduced a bill in 1836 establishing normal schools in the province. He was elected to the municipal council for Quebec City in 1840 but resigned in 1842 to become registrar for Berthier County.

He died at Quebec City in 1846.
