= Pierre-Jean de Sales Laterrière =

Pierre-Jean de Sales Laterrière (French pronunciation: [pjɛʁ ʒɑ̃ də sal latɛʁjɛʁ]; 1 July 1789 in Baie-du-Febvre, Quebec – 1834 in Les Éboulements, Lower Canada) was a medical doctor, militia officer and author; the elder son of Pierre de Sales Laterrière and Marie-Catherine Delezenne.

In 1807 or 1808 he went to England to study medicine at St Thomas' Hospital in London under Sir Astley Paston Cooper, a famous surgeon. Admitted to membership in the Royal College of Surgeons of England in 1809, he did a period of training in a military hospital at Ramsgate.

On returning to Quebec in 1810 Laterrière took over his father’s druggists shop and clientele. Early in 1812 he went into partnership with his younger brother Marc-Pascal de Sales Laterrière, who had recently returned from studying medicine in Philadelphia. At that time there were, other than Laterrière, few if any surgeons in Lower Canada with experience of military hospitals. Consequently on 24 April 1812 he was appointed surgeon to the Voltigeurs Canadiens, a militia regiment.

In 1815 he went to Europe to settle up a family estate, and married Mary Ann Bulmer in London on 16 August 1815. During his absence his father, Pierre de Sales Laterrière died. Thanks to both the inheritance he received from his father and money inherited from his wife's family he was quite rich and opened a new apothecary’s shop in the Ville de Quebec and started practising medicine again. He was active in social causes and was involved in the establishment of the Quebec Dispensary which provided free treatment to the poor. He lived for most of the last decade of his life in London and frequently travelled between Europe and Canada. In 1830 he published a book on Lower Canada to try to educate the British about the needs and expectations of their colony. He died, from diabetes, while on a visit to Les Éboulements.
