= Thomas Busby (soldier) =

Irish soldier (1735–1798)

Thomas Busby (1735 – 22 October 1798) was a soldier and innkeeper from Ireland.

Busby was with the 27th Regiment of Foot during the Seven Years' War in Canada. A planned action against the French fortress at Louisbourg, Nova Scotia was canceled. Busby saw much action with James Abercrombie's first attack on Fort Carillon on Lake Champlain, and, in 1759, participated in the capture of Carillon and Fort Saint Frédéric (also on Lake Champlain at modern day Crown Point, New York).

His son, also named Thomas Busby, was a member of the Lower Canada legislature and served as business agent for the barons of Longueuil.
