= Joseph Samson (Lower Canada politician) =

Canadian politician

Joseph Samson (November 10, 1771 – May 31, 1843) was a businessman and political figure in Lower Canada. He represented Dorchester in the Legislative Assembly of Lower Canada from 1827 to 1830.

He was born in Pointe-Lévy, the son of Étienne Samson and Marguerite Bégin. Samson conducted business in both Pointe-Lévy and Quebec City and was also involved in farming. He was married twice: to Élisabeth Roi in 1803 and then to Rosalie Bergeron in 1831. Samson ran unsuccessfully for the Dorchester seat in 1808 and 1816. He did not run for reelection in 1830. Samson died in Saint-Antoine-de-Tilly at the age of 71.

His uncle Charles Bégin had also been a member of the assembly.
