= Henry Georgen =

Canadian politician

Henry Georgen (January 28, 1787 – July 3, 1815) was a lawyer and political figure in Lower Canada. He represented Bedford in the Legislative Assembly of Lower Canada from 1814 to 1815.

He was born in Kingston, Quebec (now Ontario), the son of Christopher Georgen, of German descent, and Phebe Right, of United Empire Loyalist descent. Georgen moved with his family to Montreal, studied law and was called to the Lower Canada bar in 1810. He set up practice in Montreal. Georgen was a captain in the militia during the War of 1812. He died in office at the age of 28.
