= Michel Clouet =

Canadian politician

Michel Clouet (January 9, 1770 – January 5, 1836) was a businessman and political figure in Lower Canada.

He was born in Beauport in 1770. He operated a general store at Quebec City, was partners with François Huot in a retail company from 1796 to 1797 and then went on to operate his own store at Quebec which mainly sold hardware. He married Marie-Josephte Lalime, the daughter of seaman Michel Lépine, dit Lalime, in 1801. Clouet served in the militia during the War of 1812 as captain and then major. He was elected to the Legislative Assembly of Lower Canada for Quebec County in an 1822 by-election held after the death of Louis Gauvreau; he served until 1833 when he resigned for health reasons. Louis-Théodore Besserer replaced him in the assembly after a by-election held later that year. Clouet also served as justice of the peace for Quebec district.

He died at Quebec in 1836 and was buried at Beauport.

His sister Josephte married Étienne-François Parent, a farmer; their son Étienne later served in the legislative assembly. His sister Louise married Pierre Simard, a baker; their son Georges-Honoré went on to serve in the Canadian House of Commons and the Legislative Assembly of Quebec. His niece Josephte married Hector-Simon Huot, the son of his former partner François.
