= John Jones (Bedford politician) =

Canadian politician

John Jones (1761–1842) was a political figure in Lower Canada. He represented Bedford in the Legislative Assembly of Lower Canada from 1809 to 1810 and from 1820 to 1821.

He was born in Montreal, the son of John Jones, of Welsh descent. While young, he lived for a time in New York state and came to Quebec with his parents at the beginning of the American Revolution. Jones rejoined the British troops, was taken prisoner at Saratoga and was released at the end of the war. He settled at William Henry with his family. In 1786, he married Marie-Magdelaine Heney. Jones served in the militia for the Eastern Townships during the War of 1812 and later reached the rank of lieutenant-colonel. He also was a potash inspector at William Henry. Jones did not run for reelection in 1810; his election in 1820 was overturned the following year. He died at Saint-Jean-sur-Richelieu.

Jones' brother Robert Jones also served in the Lower Canada assembly. His son Robert served in the assembly for the Province of Canada.
