= Jean-Baptiste Ferré =

Canadian politician

Jean-Baptiste Ferré (February 12, 1767 – February 27, 1828) was a miller and political figure in Lower Canada. He represented York in the Legislative Assembly of Lower Canada from 1815 to 1820. His name also appears as Jean-Baptiste Féré.

He was born in Quebec City, the son of Jean-Baptiste Ferré and Angélique Brisson, and later settled in Saint-Eustache. In 1788, he married Josephte Bouchard. Ferré developed a process for making grinding wheels for flour mills but was unable to secure exclusive use of this process. He served as a captain in the militia during the War of 1812 but was stripped of his rank by governor George Ramsay in 1827. Ferré was first elected to the assembly in an 1815 by-election held following the death of William Forbes and was reelected in 1816. He did not run for reelection to the assembly in 1820. Ferré died in Saint-Eustache at the age of 61.
