= Joseph Bresse =

Canadian politician

Joseph Bresse (October 27, 1769 – April 1, 1836) was a merchant and political figure in Lower Canada. He represented Kent in the Legislative Assembly of Lower Canada from 1814 to 1816.

He was born Pierre Bresse in Montreal, the son of Pierre Bresse dit Lajeunesse and Marie-Louise Nicault dit Contois. He established himself in business at Chambly. In 1796, he married Marguerite Sabatté. Bresse served as lieutenant in the militia during the War of 1812, later reaching the rank of lieutenant-colonel. He also served as a commissioner for the construction of a road between Longueuil and Chambly and for the draining of a marsh located between Boucherville and Varennes. Bresse did not run for re-election to the assembly in 1816. He died in Chambly at the age of 66.
