= James Fraser (Lower Canada politician) =

Canadian politician

James Fraser (ca 1785 – September 15, 1844) was a merchant and political figure in Lower Canada. He represented Montreal West in the Legislative Assembly of Lower Canada from 1814 to 1816.

Fraser was a broker and auctioneer at Montreal. In 1814, he married Ann Brownson. He was defeated when he ran for reelection in 1816. Fraser died in Montreal.
