= Louis-Marie-Raphaël Barbier =

Canadian physician, surgeon, and politician

Louis-Marie-Raphaël Barbier (11 March 1792 – 29 April 1852) was a medical doctor and surgeon from Berthier-en-Haut in Lower Canada.

He was also elected to the Legislative Assembly of Lower Canada and served there from 1824 to 1827.
