= Jean-Marie Rochon =

Canadian politician

Jean-Marie Rochon (March 1774 – February 13, 1837) was a master carpenter and political figure in Lower Canada. He represented Leinster from 1822 to 1827 and Lachenaie from 1830 to 1837 in the Legislative Assembly of Lower Canada.

He was born in Mascouche, Quebec, the son of Michel Rochon and Marie-Euphrasie Boismier, and later moved to Lachenaie. In 1799, he married Céleste Cotinot, dit Laurier, a first cousin once removed. Rochon was first elected in an 1822 by-election held following the death of Jacques Trullier, dit Lacombe. He was reelected in 1824 but defeated when he ran for reelection in 1827. Rochon voted in support of the Ninety-Two Resolutions. He died in office at Lachenaie at the age of 62.
