= Pierre de Sales Laterrière =

French adventurer (1743–1815)

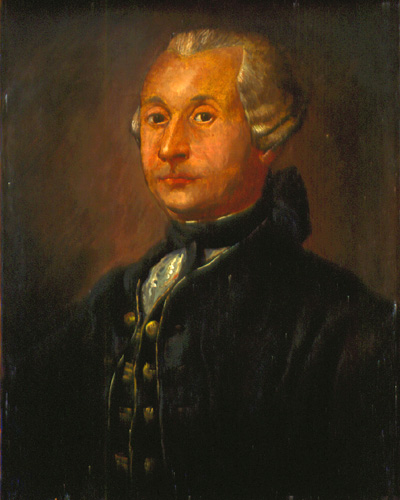
Pierre de Sales Laterrière (1743–1815)

Pierre de Sales Laterrière (French pronunciation: [pjɛʁ də sal latɛʁjɛʁ]; 1743 or 1747 – 14 June 1815), was an adventurer who left France in 1766. He was inspector and director of the ironworking Forges du Saint-Maurice and seigneur of the municipality Les Éboulements in New France (Canada).

Sales Laterrière was born near Albi, (perhaps) the son of a French count, Jean Pierre De Sales. He was employed as a clerk by Alexandre Dumas at Quebec City. In 1769, he left Quebec City to practice medicine with a doctor at Montmagny. Though he said he had studied medicine in Paris, Laterrière probably began practicing medicine with no formal medical training, not uncommon at that time.

In 1771, he was employed as an agent for the Saint-Maurice ironworks at Quebec City. In 1775, Laterrière was hired as inspector for the ironworks and he moved to Trois-Rivières. In 1776, the director of the ironworks, Christophe Pélissier (businessman), was arrested by the British for supplying weapons and ammunition to the American army that was advancing towards Quebec. Laterrière was given the post of director after Pélissier fled to the United States. He also began living with Pélissier's wife, Marie-Catherine Delezenne. Despite public opinion and criticism from the clergy, this free thinker, defender of midwives and freemason lived unmarried with Marie-Catherine until they finally married in 1799, after the death of her first husband.

Imprisoned by the British Governor Frederick Haldimand on the day following the American Invasion, he was then exiled in Newfoundland from 1782 to 1783, following a (probably) false charge of treason. He returned to Quebec and settled on a farm at Baie-du-Febvre (later Baieville) where he resumed the practice of medicine. In 1788, following the passing of "An Act or Ordinance to prevent persons practising physic and surgery within the Province of Quebec, or Midwifery in the towns of Quebec or Montreal, without Licence" the province of Quebec began to insist on doctors producing their credentials or passing an examination. As Laterrière could not produce a medical degree and failed to pass the oral examination he went to study medicine at Harvard University in Massachusetts where a medical school had recently opened and qualified to practice medicine one year later, in 1789. He was Harvard Medical School's first foreign graduate. He returned to Quebec to practice medicine and in 1799, he moved his medical practice to Quebec City. His income from practicing medicine and investments allowed him to purchase the seigneury of Les Éboulements in 1810. He died at Quebec City in 1815.

His sons Marc Pascal and Pierre-Jean both became doctors and important figures in the province.
