= George Platt (politician) =

Canadian politician

George Platt (01 Sep 1774 in Saratoga, New York, British America – died 09 Sep 1818 in Quebec, Canada) was a blacksmith and political figure in Lower Canada. He represented Montreal East in the Legislative Assembly of Lower Canada from 1814 to 1816.

Platt established himself in business in Montreal, dealing in hardware. He was a freemason. Platt served as a captain in the Royal Montreal Cavalry during the War of 1812. He married Elizabeth Mittleberger on 19 Dec 1805 in Montréal, Quebec, Canada.

The engine for the Accommodation, the first successful steamboat built entirely in North America was built at George Platt's foundry in Montreal. The Accommodation was launched 19 August 1809.
