= Thomas Busby (Lower Canada politician) =

Canadian politician (1768–1836)

Thomas Busby (December 16, 1768 – September 8, 1836) was a merchant and political figure in Lower Canada. He represented Montreal East in the Legislative Assembly of Lower Canada in 1820.

He was born in Montreal, the son of Irish-born soldier and innkeeper Thomas Busby; his mother's name was Christina. Busby was agent for the barons of Longueuil. He was one of the promoters for a canal on the Saint Lawrence River from the Courant Sainte-Marie to Lachine and participated in the incorporation of the Bank of Montreal in 1821. He also served as administrator for the General Hospital. Busby received a land grant in Acton township. He served in the militia during the War of 1812, later reaching the rank of captain. Elected in April 1820, Busby did not run for reelection in the election held in July 1820. He died in Montreal at the age of 67.
