= George Browne (Lower Canada politician) =

Canadian politician

George Browne (before 1794 – June 10, 1822) was a merchant and political figure in Lower Canada. He represented Gaspé in the Legislative Assembly of Lower Canada from 1814 to 1816.

He was a merchant and importer of goods based in Quebec City. Browne did not run for reelection in 1816. He died in Quebec City.
