= Northumberland County, Quebec =

Northumberland County, Quebec is a local division within Quebec and also formerly in Lower Canada.
