= Jacob Oldham =

Canadian politician

Jacob Oldham (ca. 1768 – June 11, 1824) was an English-born lawyer, businessman and political figure in Lower Canada. He represented Effingham in the Legislative Assembly of Lower Canada from 1820 to 1824.

He studied law in London and was called to the English bar in 1790. He came to Lower Canada the following year and set up practice in Terrebonne. Oldham was also seigneurial agent for Terrebonne. He served as a justice of the peace and was a major in the militia during the War of 1812. Oldham married Madeleine Campion around May 1796. He died in office in Quebec City.
