= François-Xavier Paré =

Canadian politician

François-Xavier Paré (March 24, 1793 – September 13, 1836) was a political figure in Lower Canada. He represented Hertford in the Legislative Assembly of Lower Canada from 1820 to 1824.

He was born in Saint-François-de-la-Rivière-du-Sud, the son of Louis Paré and Hélène Bossé. Paré served as an officer in the militia during the War of 1812 and later reached the rank of captain in the Chasseurs Canadiens. In 1817, he married Rose-Angèle Lappare. Paré did not run for reelection to the assembly in 1824. He died in Saint-François-de-la-Rivière-du-Sud at the age of 43.
