= Christophe Pélissier (businessman) =

- Born: April 29, 1728; Saint-Pierre et Saint-Saturnin, Lyon, France
- Died: before October 1779; France
- Military career
- Allegiance: United States
- Branch: Army
- Service years: Continental Army: 1776
- Rank: Engineer lieutenant colonel

Christophe Pélissier (sometimes spelled Pellissier; April 29, 1728 – before October 1779) was a Canadian businessman.

== Life ==
Pélissier was born in the parish of Saint-Pierre et Saint-Saturnin in Lyon, France, the son of François-Christophe Pélissier, a merchant, and Agathe Martaud La Rigaudière. He died, apparently in France, in 1779.

He was director of the Saint-Maurice ironworks near the city of Trois-Rivières in Quebec in the mid-1770s.

When the Americans invaded Quebec in 1775, Pélissier, whom his business associate Pierre de Sales Laterrière described as a "strong supporter of John Wilkes and his system of freedom", strongly supported the American cause. General Richard Montgomery met with him in December 1775 to discuss the establishment of a provincial convention for the purpose of electing representatives to the Second Continental Congress, a step Pélissier advised against until Quebec City was taken.

His ironworks supplied ammunition, bombs, and cannonballs for the siege of Quebec; he also wrote a letter to the Second Continental Congress on January 8, 1776, to point out the measures they should take for a successful taking of Quebec. As the Americans retreated from Quebec in May and June 1776, Pélissier fled the province with them. On July 29, 1776, he received an engineering lieutenant colonel's commission in the Continental Army, and in October assisted in the improvement of the defenses at Fort Ticonderoga. He eventually returned to his family home in France.

When he fled Quebec, Pélissier left behind his second wife Catherine, who began to have an affair with Laterrière in his absence. (It is likely that Laterrière was also a suitor of hers prior to her marriage.) Pélissier, apparently unaware of the affair, was eventually granted permission to return to Quebec to bring her to France. He finally left Quebec for good and returned to France in 1778 only with the children from his first marriage, and the satisfaction of having Laterrière accused of collaboration with the Americans (for which Laterrière would spend three years in prison).

Laterrière and Catherine married in October 1779, presumably having received word of Pélissier's death.
