= Thomas Ainslie (colonial official) =

Documentarian of the American invasion of Quebec (1729–1806)

- Born: 8 February 1729; Jedburgh, Roxburghshire, Scotland
- Died: 7 April 1806 (aged 77); Edinburgh, Midlothian, Scotland
- Spouses: Mary Potts (married 1762–1767); Elizabeth Martin (married 1772–1787); Elizabeth Williamson (married 1790
- Children: 12: Christian Ainslie

Thomas Ainslie (8 February 1729 – 7 April 1806) is most known for his role as HM Collector of Customs at Quebec, with the British HM Customs, a department of the British Government. He served in Quebec as a loyalist to the crown, staunchly protecting its interests in the colony. Thomas Ainslie is the author of a journal on the siege of Quebec by the American Continental Army in the Battle of Quebec (1775).

On 29 September 1768, Ainslie registered arms with Lord Lyon as the descendant of the Ainslies of Dolphinston. The Lord Lyon Depute granted Thomas's request, and the arms implicitly claim descent as the senior descendant of the Ainslies of Dolphinston.

In the Thirteen Colonies, Ainslie appears to have been the British Customs Officer presiding over the Duty that provoked the Boston Tea Party.

== Marriage ==
His first wife, Mary Potts, was twenty-five when she died. Ainslie had eight children with Elizabeth Martin. His daughter of that union, Christian, married his business partner, John Young (seigneur)

== Heraldry ==
On 15 August 2012, the registration of the Armorial Bearings of Thomas Ainslie was given under the seal of the Canadian Heraldic Authority.

== Bibliography ==
- Canada preserved; the journal of Captain Thomas Ainslie, ed. S. S. Cohen ([Toronto, 1968])
- Blockade of Quebec in 1775–1776 by the American revolutionists (les Bastonnais), ed. F. C. Würtele (Quebec, 1906; repr. Port Washington, N.Y., and London, 1970)
