= Noël Breux =

Canadian politician

Noël Breux (March 4, 1773 – June 9, 1861) was a farmer and political figure in Lower Canada. He represented Kent in the Legislative Assembly of Lower Canada from 1814 to 1816.

He was born in Chambly, the son of Noël Breux dit Lagiroflée, formerly a soldier in the French army, and Angélique Poirier. Breux served as a captain in the militia and as a commissioner for the summary trial of small causes. He did not run for reelection to the assembly in 1816. He was married twice, first to Marie-Thérèse Lagus in 1794 and then to Josephte Pallardie in 1831. Breux died in Chambly at the age of 88.
