= François Saint-Onge =

Canadian politician

François Saint-Onge (March 9, 1781 – February 27, 1842) was a merchant and political figure in Lower Canada. He represented Richelieu in the Legislative Assembly of Lower Canada from 1820 to 1824. His surname also appears as Garau, Garault dit Saint-Onge and Gareau.

He was born François-Étienne Saint-Onge in Contrecœur, the son of François Gareau and Élisabeth Dufaux, and settled in Saint-Ours. Saint-Onge also served as justice of the peace and commissioner for the summary trial of minor causes. In 1798, he married Marie-Angélique dite Labonté, a relative; her surname also appears as Laporte. He did not run for reelection to the assembly in 1824. Perrault died in Saint-Ours at the age of 60.
