= Thomas Ainslie Young =

Canadian politician

- Born: 12-Jun-1797; Quebec, Lower Canada
- Died: 08-Feb-1860; Quebec City, District Judiciaire de Québec, Canada East
- Occupation: Police Magistrate
- Spouse: Monique Ursule Baby (married 1823-1838)
- Children: 8: Thomas Ainslie Young; Agnes Ainslie Young; John Young; Ann Young; Elizabeth Ainslie Young; Elmire Mathilde Young; Sophie Charlotte Young; Caroline Louise Young

Thomas Ainslie Young (June 12, 1797 – February 8, 1860) was an official and political figure in Lower Canada.

He was born in Quebec City in 1797, the son of John Young (seigneur) and grandson of Thomas Ainslie (colonial official), and studied in Lower Canada and in London. In 1820, he was appointed controller of customs for the Port of Quebec; he was inspector general of the public accounts for Lower Canada from 1823 to 1826, when he was named auditor general for the public accounts. In 1823, Young married Monique-Ursule, the daughter of François Baby. He was elected to the Legislative Assembly of Lower Canada for the Lower Town of Quebec in 1824 and reelected in 1827 and 1830. He voted against the Ninety-Two Resolutions.

He served as sheriff for Quebec district from 1823 to 1827. In 1828, he was named a justice of the peace. Young served as inspector and superintendent of police for Quebec City from 1837 to 1840. In 1838, he arrested the editor and printer for Le Canadien, a newspaper viewed as inflammatory. In 1839, he arrested the editor of Le Fantasque of Quebec on similar charges. He arrested a number of other individuals suspected of being involved in rebel activity during the Lower Canada Rebellion; most were released without being charged some time later. From 1840 to 1842, he was police magistrate for Quebec district. Young also served in the militia, becoming major, and was a director of the Royal Institution for the Advancement of Learning.

He died in Quebec City in 1860.
