= William Forbes (Lower Canada politician) =

Canadian politician

William Forbes (July 21, 1787 – November 22, 1814) was a merchant and political figure in Lower Canada. He represented York in the Legislative Assembly of Lower Canada in 1814.

He was born Guillaume Forbes in Rivière-du-Loup, the son of John Forbes, a native of Scotland, and Ann McDonell. Forbes established himself in business at Vaudreuil. He received a contract to supply wood to the army during the War of 1812. In the summer of 1814, Forbes was involved in transporting goods for the army from Montreal to Kingston. He died in office in Montreal at the age of 27.
