= Michel Prévost =

Canadian politician

Michel Prévost (September 30, 1753 – July 17, 1843) was a merchant and political figure in Lower Canada. He represented Leinster in the Legislative Assembly of Lower Canada from 1815 to 1816 and from 1820 to 1824 as a supporter of the Parti canadien.

He was born in Montreal, the son of Eustache Prévost and Marie-Jeanne Valade. In 1789, he married Félicité Bourdon. Around the same time, he established himself as a miller and merchant at Saint-Jacques-de-l'Achigan (later Saint-Jacques). Prévost served as a captain in the militia during the War of 1812, later reaching the rank of major. He was first elected to the assembly in an 1815 by-election held after the election of Jacques Trullier, dit Lacombe was overturned. He died in Montreal at the age of 89.
