= Augustin Richer =

Canadian politician

Augustin Richer (February 5, 1754 – August 2, 1824) was a farmer and political figure in Lower Canada. He represented Montreal County in the Legislative Assembly of Lower Canada from 1814 to 1820.

He was born Augustin Laflèche in Sainte-Anne-de-la-Pérade, the son of Pierre Laflèche (also known as Pierre Richer dit Laflèche) and Charlotte Normandeau-Deslauriers. In 1791, he married Marie-Madeleine Beautron-Major. Richer was a captain in the militia during the War of 1812. He did not run for reelection to the assembly in 1820. Richer died at Saint-Laurent at the age of 70.
