= James Cockburn (Lower Canada politician) =

Canadian politician

James Cockburn (ca 1763 – August 19, 1819) was a Canadian physician and political figure in Lower Canada. He represented Gaspé in the Legislative Assembly of Lower Canada from 1816 to 1819.

He was born in Chichester and practised medicine there before coming to Lower Canada. He was authorized to practise in Lower Canada in 1806. Cockburn was a surgeon and pharmacist in Quebec City. He established a hospital in the Lower Town there for sailors and victims of accidents on ships. He married his second wife, a Miss McKeige, in 1819. Cockburn died in office near Newfoundland while sailing to England aboard the William Pitt and was probably buried at sea.
