= Marc-Pascal de Sales Laterrière =

Canadian politician (1792–1872)

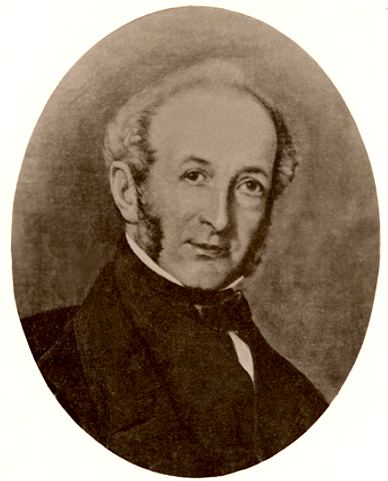
Marc-Pascal de Sales Laterrière

Marc-Pascal de Sales Laterrière (French pronunciation: [maʁk paskal də sal latɛʁjɛʁ]; March 25, 1792 – March 29, 1872) was a Quebec doctor, seigneur and political figure.

He was born in Baie-du-Febvre, Lower Canada in 1792, the son of Pierre de Sales Laterrière who became the seigneur of Les Éboulements. Laterrière studied at the Petit Séminaire of Quebec and went on to study medicine in Philadelphia. He served as surgeon with the militia during the War of 1812 and set up practice in Lower Town, Quebec City until 1816. Laterrière then returned to Les Éboulements to take on his responsibilities as seigneur. He married Eulalie-Antoinette, the daughter of merchant Claude Dénéchau. He represented Northumberland County in the Legislative Assembly of Lower Canada from 1824 to 1830 and then Saguenay County from 1830 until 1832, when he was appointed to the Legislative Council. In 1838, he was named to the Special Council that governed Lower Canada after the Rebellions of 1837. He opposed union with Upper Canada but, was elected to the Legislative Assembly of the Province of Canada in an 1845 by-election for Saguenay and was reelected in 1848 and 1851. Also in 1848, Laterrière was named adjutant-general of the militia of Lower Canada and, so, had to run again for the same seat in a by-election held later that year. In 1856, he was elected to the Legislative Council in Laurentides division. He ran unsuccessfully for a seat in the Canadian House of Commons in 1867.

Laterrière died at Les Éboulements in 1872.

His daughter Eugénie married Charles Alphonse Pantaléon Pelletier, who later became a member of the Canadian Senate and Lieutenant Governor of Quebec.
