= Pierre Brehaut =

Canadian politician

Pierre Brehaut (June 7, 1764 – May 2, 1817) was a businessman and political figure in Lower Canada. He represented Quebec County in the Legislative Assembly of Lower Canada from 1814 to 1817. He was also known as Peter Brehaut.

He was born in Guernsey, the son of Pierre Brehaut and Marie Todevin, and came to Quebec City around 1788. He found work there as a cooper for Louis Dunière, later going into business on his own. In 1792, he married Thérèse Bellenoy. In 1800, Brehaut purchased river-front property from Dunière which included a wharf and warehouses; he established a wholesale business, trading mainly in grain, wine and spirits. In 1816, he purchased the Cape Diamond Brewery from Thomas Dunn. Brehaut died in office at Quebec City at the age of 52.
