= John Neilson (Lower Canada politician) =

Newspaper editor, publisher and politician in Lower Canada

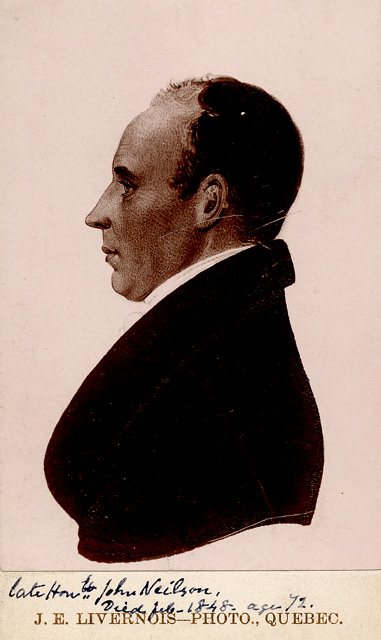

Member of the Legislative Assembly of Lower Canada, for Quebec County (two-member constituency)
- In office 1818 – 1834 (1 by-election and 4 general elections) Serving with: Louis Gauvreau (1818–1822); Michel Clouet (1822–1833); Louis-Théodore Besserer (1833–1834)
- Preceded by: Pierre Brehaut
- Succeeded by: Jean Blanchet

Member of the Legislative Council of Lower Canada
- In office August 22, 1837 – March 27, 1838

Member of the Special Council of Lower Canada
- In office April 2, 1838 – June 1, 1838
- In office November 2, 1838 – February 10, 1841

Member of the Legislative Assembly of the Province of Canada for Quebec County
- In office 1841–1844
- Preceded by: New position
- Succeeded by: Pierre-Joseph-Olivier Chauveau

Member of the Legislative Council of the Province of Canada
- In office 1844–1848

Personal details
- Born: July 17, 1776 Balmaghie, Scotland
- Died: February 1, 1848 (aged 71) Cap-Rouge, Province of Canada
- Party: Lower Canada: Parti canadien Province of Canada: Anti-unionist; French-Canadian Group
- Spouse: Marie-Ursule Hubert
- Relations: Thomas Lee (son-in-law)
- Children: 10
- Occupation: Journalist; newspaper publisher; book printer and bookseller

Military service
- Allegiance: British Empire; Lower Canada
- Branch/service: Lower Canada militia
- Rank: Lieutenant, 1824

John Neilson (July 17, 1776 – February 1, 1848) was a journalist, publisher and politician in Lower Canada (now Quebec). Born in Scotland, he emigrated to Lower Canada in 1791 at age 15, to work in his older brother's publishing company in Quebec City. On his brother's death a few years later, he inherited the business. Neilson became one of the leading publishers and booksellers in Lower Canada and in Upper Canada (now Ontario), selling books in both French and English. He was the editor of the newspaper La Gazette de Québec / The Quebec Gazette, published in French and in English.

Once well-established financially, Neilson entered politics. Elected to the Legislative Assembly of Lower Canada as a supporter of the Parti canadien, he became a strong opponent to the provincial government under the governors appointed by the British government. He argued for greater control of the provincial government by the elected Legislative Assembly of Lower Canada. In 1823, he and Louis-Joseph Papineau travelled to London to argue against a proposal to merge Lower Canada with Upper Canada. In 1828, he was part of another delegation to London, to make submissions criticizing the financial controls of the governors. Although an ally of some of the leading French-Canadian politicians, such as Papineau, he gradually split with them as they became increasingly more radical during the 1830s. He opposed the Lower Canada Rebellion which broke out in 1837.

The result of the rebellion was that the two provinces were merged into a single province, the Province of Canada. In 1841, Neilson was elected to the Legislative Assembly of the new Parliament of the Province of Canada, where he opposed the union. He was defeated in the general election of 1844, but then was named by the governor to the Legislative Council, the appointed upper house of the Parliament. He held that position for the rest of his life.

== Family and early life ==
Neilson was born in Dornal in the parish of Balmaghie, Scotland, in 1776, son of William Neilson and Isabel Brown. In 1791, he emigrated to Quebec City, Lower Canada, to work for his older brother, Samuel Neilson, who was operating the newspaper and publishing company of their deceased maternal uncle, William Brown. John Neilson formally inherited the business in 1793 when his brother Samuel died. Because he himself was underage, Neilson was under the tutelage of a Presbyterian minister, Alexander Spark, until reaching the age of majority and being able to acquire full control of the business. In one burst of youthful exuberance, he went to New York without permission, but duly apologised to Spark on his return.

In 1797, he married Marie-Ursule Hubert, a niece of Jean-François Hubert, Bishop of Quebec. The marriage ceremony was conducted by an Anglican priest in the presence of a Roman Catholic priest. The couple signed a notarial marriage contract, governed by the coutume de Paris, the French law in force in Lower Canada. He explained in a letter to his mother that he wished to show that he had permanently established himself in Lower Canada, and provide an example that Canadians and British immigrants could live together. The couple had ten children, with their sons raised Presbyterians, and their daughters raised Catholic.

== Business career: publishing, bookselling, landholdings ==
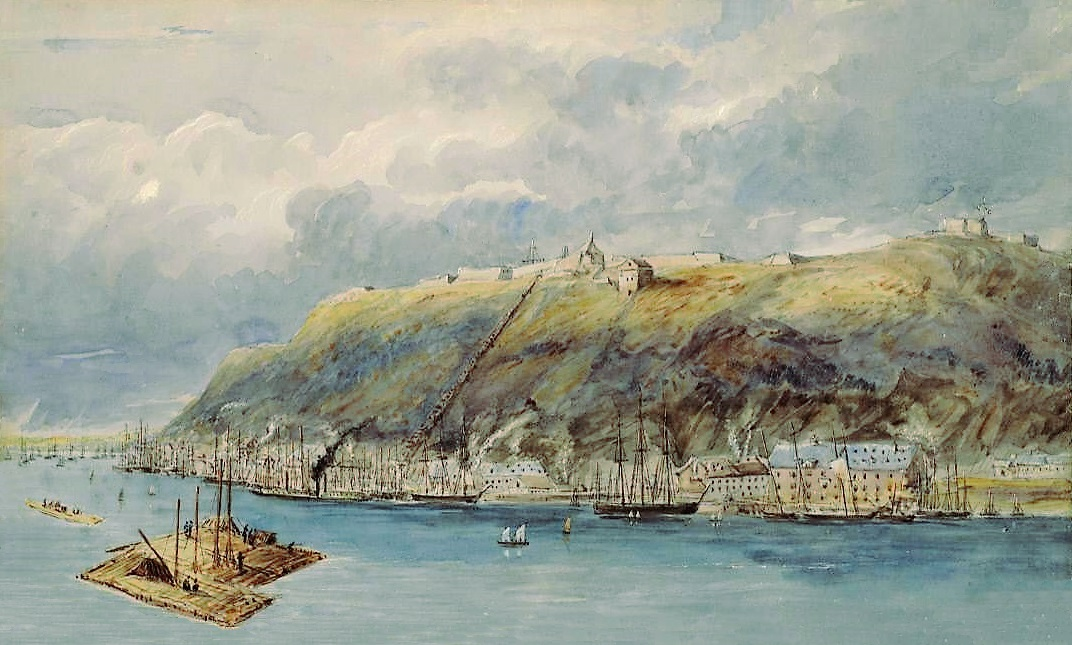
Quebec City, 1827, where Neilson lived and had his business

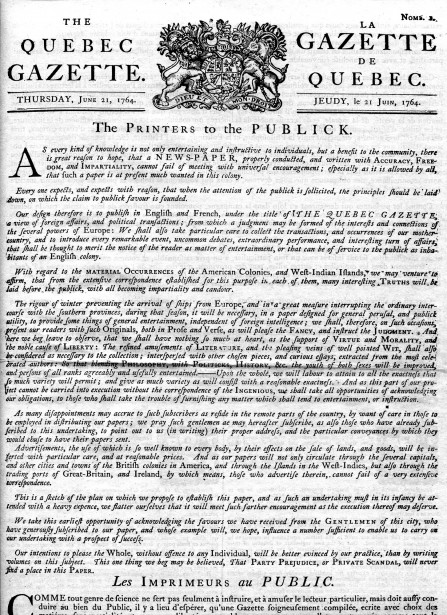
The Quebec Gazette / Gazette de Quebec, June 21, 1764

Neilson steadily developed the printing and book-selling business until he was the leading printer and bookseller in Lower Canada, with major links to Upper Canada. He published the Quebec Gazette/La Gazette de Québec in English and French. It was the largest circulation newspaper in the two Canadas, and expanded when he imported special types and presses for his business. He showed strong abilities in business, particularly in keeping detailed track of his finances and accounting. He would go to court if necessary to ensure payments of his accounts, but preferred to rely on personal relations and private arbitrations in financial disputes. According to his rival James Brown of Montreal, Neilson's publishing house was "the largest consumer of paper in this country".

A large part of his business was publishing government proclamations, forms, and records. He also imported and published books of a general nature, theological texts, hymnals, school books, and books on political philosophy and history, and texts on law and medicine. He offered texts in both English and French, from the United Kingdom, the United States, and, after the end of the Napoleonic Wars, from France. He was a well-read man, and fluent in both English and French. He developed a large clientele in the professional classes, from both French Canadians and British Canadians.

As a natural outgrowth of his business, Neilson was also interested in literary matters in the province, being a member of various literary societies, and the owner of the Théâtre Canadien. He was a trustee for the Royal Institute for the Advancement of Learning, and took an interest in developing schools in the province, particularly in the rural areas. On one trip to London, he spoke to the Foreign Schools Society about the difficulties that the Legislative Assembly was having in developing a school system, which he envisaged would be done through the churches.

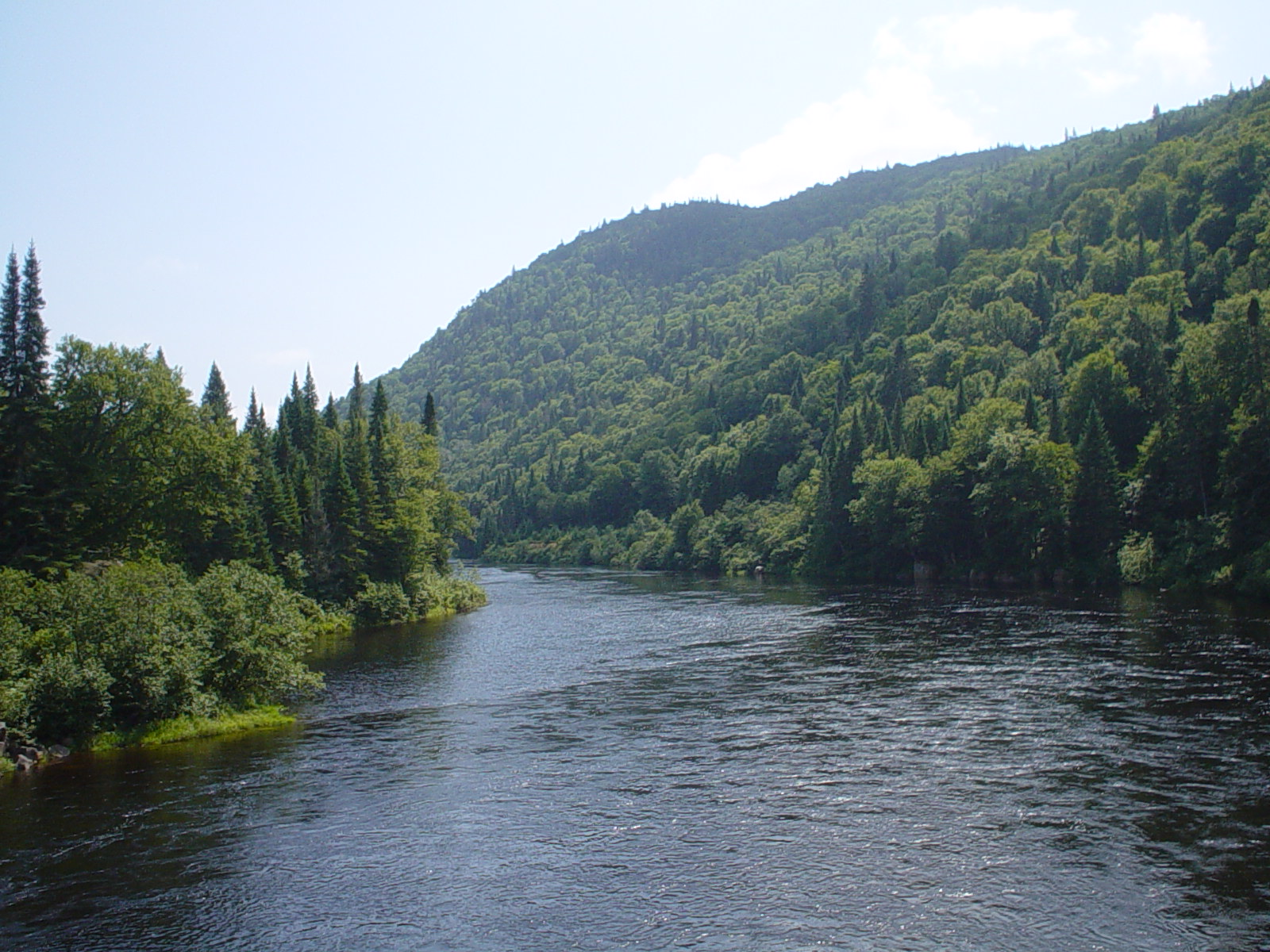
The Jacques-Cartier River

As his publishing business prospered, Neilson expanded into land-holdings, with interests in agriculture and encouraging immigration. Around 1816, Neilson and two lawyers from Quebec, Andrew Stuart and Louis Moquin, acquired land north of Quebec in the valley of the Jacques-Cartier River. They opened the area, known as Valcartier, for settlement by Scots and Irish immigrants, as well as British veterans of the War of 1812. By 1832 Neilson had close to fifty properties in the areas of Valcartier and Cap-Rouge, where he established a permanent residence for himself. He gradually acquired land in Upper Canada, eventually worth £700.

Neilson was also interested in banking, as a shareholder and client of the Bank of Quebec. He engaged in money-lending, offering loans on generally easy terms, but with fixed repayment schedules.

Neilson was a Justice of the Peace, and an officer in the local militia.

== Political career ==
=== Lower Canada ===
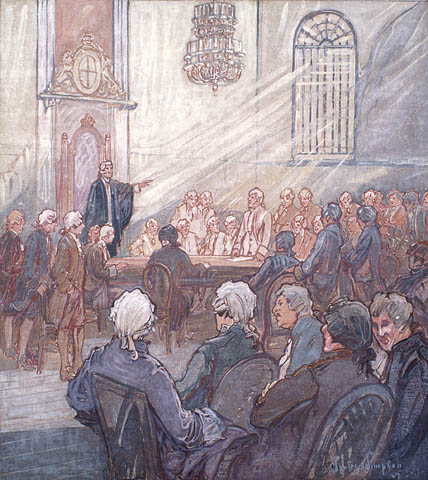
Legislative Assembly of Lower Canada, meeting in the Bishop's Chapel, Quebec

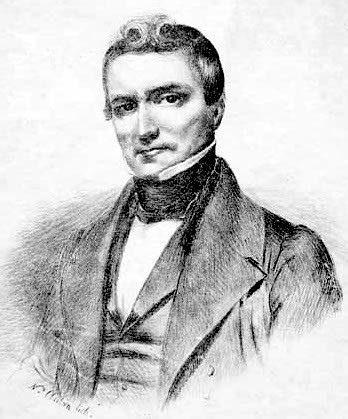
Louis-Joseph Papineau, Neilson's onetime ally in the Assembly, later bitter rival

Neilson has been termed a moderate reformer or moderate liberal. Unlike some of the other Lower Canada newspapers, the Quebec Gazette did not take radical positions. He had a strong admiration for the British constitution, and also sympathies for the political concerns of French Canadians, such as increased popular control over the provincial government and the abolition of the seigneurial system. He was also strongly committed to the existing constitutional structure of Lower Canada, set out in the Constitutional Act, 1791. He was gradually attracted to politics, at first supporting Pierre-Stanislas Bédard, an early leader of the Parti canadien, then James Stuart, and then moving towards Louis-Joseph Papineau. Bédard considered Neilson to be one of his most important supporters. Neilson was elected to the Legislative Assembly of Lower Canada in a by-election in 1818, representing Quebec County, the rural areas surrounding Quebec City. He was re-elected in four subsequent elections.

As a member of the British merchant class, Neilson brought some support from British Canadians to the Parti canadien, particularly by his reliance on British constitutional principles and commitment to the monarchy. At the same time, through his personal qualities of patience and perseverance, he helped support Papineau, who admitted that he was not strong in those qualities.

In 1823, the British government began to consider reunifying Lower Canada with Upper Canada. Neilson accompanied Papineau to London to lobby against the union project in the name of the majority of the MPs in the Legislative Assembly. The British government did not proceed with the proposal at that time.

In 1828, he was again part of a delegation sent to London, this time with Austin Cuvillier and Denis-Benjamin Viger, to present the party's demands for reform of the provincial government, particularly that the Assembly needed to have greater control over the provincial finances. They presented a petition with 80,000 signatures supporting the demand for greater local control. The British government offered significant concessions on the points raised by the Lower Canada delegation, leading to Papineau writing a letter of thanks to Neilson on his return.

During Neilson's time in the Assembly, he was a strong advocate for the censitaires, the tenant farmers who held their land under the seigneurial system. The possible abolition of the seigneurial system was one of the major issues of the day, with competing interests of the feudal seigneurs and the tenant censitaires. He took the position that if the seigneurial system were abolished, the censitaires should receive title to their plots at no cost. He was also concerned that the seigneurial system was itself making it difficult for farmers to obtain arable land, with conflicts between the censitaires and the seigneurs over land use.

By 1830, Neilson began to distance himself from the Parti canadien, now referred to as the Parti patriote, which Neilson considered to be too radical and republican. He had always appealed for moderation, toleration, respect for ethnic and religious differences, and working within the constitutional framework. He began to see Papineau as a radical who detested the constitution and favoured anticlericalism and nationalism. He feared the economic consequences of the increasing radicalism of the Patriotes. In 1833, he wrote an editorial in the Quebec Gazette stating that it was now the radicals in the Assembly who were betraying the constitution. Papineau responded with public insults.

In 1834, Neilson opposed the Ninety-Two Resolutions introduced by Papineau in the Assembly, a rewrite of the 1828 demands for reform with a radical, republican tone. In his private journal, he summarised his view of the resolutions: eleven were true, six were mixed with falsehood, sixteen were false, seventeen doubtful, twelve ridiculous, seven repetitious, fourteen very abusive, four false and seditious, and five good or indifferent. Neilson's main point of disagreement was Papineau's insistence on an elected Legislative Council, which Neilson considered to be contrary to the spirit of the 1791 constitution. In the debates on the Resolutions, Neilson was one of the leading opponents, and moved three amendments, which were defeated. For his rejection of the Resolutions and break with Papineau, he was called a "chouayen", or "turncoat".

In the general election of 1834, Neilson was badly defeated in his seat in Quebec County. Papineau had established a strong party apparatus for the Patriotes and specifically targeted Neilson, his former colleague. Worried by the trend in politics, Neilson then helped set up "constitutional associations" in the province, to argue in favour of solutions through constitutional means, and potentially to be the base for a new political party. In 1835, he again travelled to London, this time with William Walker, as delegates from the constitutional associations of Quebec and Montreal. They lobbied members of the British government for changes to the provincial government and constitution, asking them to carry through with the British parliamentary committee's recommendations in 1828. Neilson sought, unsuccessfully, to avert the possibility of rebellion in Lower Canada.

In August 1837, the governor appointed him to the Executive Council of Lower Canada and to the Legislative Council. He refused the appointment to the Executive Council, but accepted the appointment to the Legislative Council. Later that year, the Lower Canada Rebellion broke out. The British government suspended the constitution of Lower Canada and created a Special Council to govern the province, chaired by the governor. Neilson was a member of the Special Council from April to June 1838, and again from November 1838 until the creation of the Province of Canada in February 1841.

=== Province of Canada ===
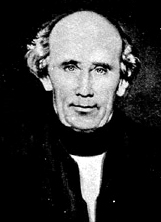
John Neilson, c. 1840

Following the rebellion in Lower Canada, and the similar Upper Canada rebellion the same year, the British government decided to merge the two provinces into a single province, as recommended by Lord Durham in the Durham Report. The Union Act, 1840, passed by the British Parliament, abolished the two provinces and their separate parliaments. The act created the Province of Canada with a single Parliament for the entire province, composed of an elected Legislative Assembly and an appointed Legislative Council. The Governor General retained a strong position in the government.

Neilson opposed the Union after its enactment. In 1841, he stood for election to the Legislative Assembly of the Parliament of the Province of Canada, campaigning against the union. He was elected by acclamation in his old riding of Quebec County. He was also one of the leading organisers of candidates opposed to the union in the Quebec region, under the general name of the Comité canadien de Québec. He garnered support from the Roman Catholic hierarchy, which saw the union as an attack on the Catholic nation canadienne. He also won support from Papineau, Denis-Benjamin Viger, and the more radical element they represented, although Papineau was in exile in France. Neilson initially aligned with the younger Louis-Hippolyte Lafontaine, who also opposed the union, but unlike Lafontaine, he considered responsible government a trick. Neilson's efforts paid off: out of the forty-two seats in Canada East, twenty or so were won by French Canadians opposed to the union.

When the new parliament convened in Kingston, Canada West, Neilson was one of the leaders of the French-Canadian group in opposition to the union. Neilson brought a motion condemning the union. After a lengthy debate, it was defeated, 50 to 25, the first major vote in the session. Neilson was one of nineteen members from Canada East who voted against the union, along with six Ultra-Reformers from Canada West. During the rest of the first session, he was a consistent opponent of Governor General Lord Sydenham, voting with the French-Canadian group in a loose alliance with the Canada West Reformers.

However, in 1843, there was a notable break in his voting pattern. In that session, there was a ministerial crisis between the primarily Reform ministry and Governor General Metcalfe, leading to the resignation of most of the ministry. In a vote in the Assembly, Neilson voted in support of the Governor General, and against the former ministry. He understood the system of working with a governor, and was suspicious of the new concept of responsible government.

Neilson stood for re-election in the general election of 1844, but was defeated by a more reform-minded candidate, Pierre-Joseph-Olivier Chauveau, representing Lafontaine's new Reform group. Shortly afterwards, the Governor General appointed Neilson to the Legislative Council, the upper house of the Parliament. He held that position for the remaining four years of his life.

== Death and legacy ==
Neilson died in Cap-Rouge in 1848 and was buried in the Presbyterian church cemetery in Valcartier. Twenty years after his death, his estate was assessed as more than £30,000 in assets, including real estate holdings, and only £25 in liabilities.

In 1976, Neilson was designated a National Historic Person by the federal government's heritage registry.

Neilson is one of the major characters in a trilogy of historical novels, A Chronicle of Lower Canada, which relates the events leading up to the Lower Canada Rebellion in 1837.

There is a street named after him in Saint-Gabriel-de-Valcartier, Quebec.

== Published works ==
List of works published by Neilson:

- Aux electeurs du comté de Quebec/To the Electors of the County of Quebec, 1820
- Letter from L.J. Papineau and J. Neilson, Esqs., Addressed to His Majesty's Under Secretary of State on the Subject of the Proposed Union of the Provinces of Upper and Lower Canada, May 10, 1823 (London: William Clowes, Northumberland-court, 1823).
- Report of the Special Committee of the House of Assembly of Lower-Canada, on the Petitions Against the Road Laws and the Office of Grand-Voyer, 1830
- Rapport du Comité spécial de la Chambre d'assemblée sur le Département du bureau de la poste dans la province du Bas-Canada, 1831
- Report of the Commissioners Appointed under the Lower Canada Act, 4th William IV. cap. 10, to Visit the United States' Penitentiaries, 1835
- Addresse aux Électeurs de Toute la Province, in Quebec Gazette, October 14, 1840.
- First report. The Select Committee Appointed to Investigate and Report on the Outrages Alleged to Have Been Committed at the General Election in the Counties of Terrebonne, Montreal, Vaudreuil, Beauharnois, Chambly and Rouville (Legislative Assembly of the Province of Canada, Kingston, 1843).

== See also ==
- Timeline of Quebec history
- Lower Canada Rebellion
- 1st Parliament of the Province of Canada
