= Charles Langevin =

Canadian politician

Charles Langevin (1789 – March 14, 1869) was a businessman and political figure in Lower Canada.

He was born in Beauport in 1789, the son of Jean Bergevin, dit Langevin and Françoise Villers. After the death of his father, his mother married François Huot in 1801. Langevin went into business, partnering with his brother Jean who was a merchant at Quebec City and then later with Joseph Masson from Montreal. Langevin was a lieutenant in the militia during the War of 1812. In 1813, he married Julie, the daughter of Augustin-Jérôme Raby. He was elected to the Legislative Assembly of Lower Canada for Hampshire in April 1820 and then again in July 1820 when the assembly was dissolved to mark the passing of King George III. In 1837, after the death of his first wife, he married Clotilde Kimber, the widow of notary René-Zéphirin Leblanc and sister of René-Joseph Kimber.

He died at Quebec City in 1869.
