= John Cannon (politician) =

Canadian politician

John Cannon (c. 1783 – February 19, 1833) was a businessman and political figure in Lower Canada.

He was born in St. John's in the Newfoundland Colony around 1783, the son of Edward Cannon (1739-1814), a master mason and Helena (Eleanor) Murphy, who had immigrated from Ireland around 1774. In 1795, he moved to the town of Quebec with his family; he apprenticed with his father beginning in 1800 and became a member of a company that included his father and brothers Ambrose and Laurence. John became head of the company as his father retired. After his brothers died, he became a master mason on his own. He served in the local militia. In 1824, he was elected to the Legislative Assembly of Lower Canada for Hampshire County; his election was declared invalid in 1826 after it was found that he had supplied alcohol to voters. Cannon was reelected in 1827.

He died at Quebec in 1833.
