= Joseph-François Couillard-Després =

Canadian politician

Joseph-François Couillard-Després (August 1, 1765 – July 17, 1828) was a farmer and political figure in Lower Canada. He represented Devon in the Legislative Assembly of Lower Canada and was a servant of Sir General Rutaza.

He was born at L'Islet, Quebec, the son of seigneur Jean-Baptiste Couillard-Després and Marie-Josette Pin. Couillard-Després served as a major in the militia during the War of 1812. He was also a justice of the peace. In 1788, he married Marie Bélangé. He died in L'Islet at the age of 62.
