= Jean Bélanger =

Canadian politician

Jean Bélanger (December 22, 1782 – August 21, 1827) was a notary and political figure in Lower Canada. He represented Quebec Lower Town in the Legislative Assembly of Lower Canada from 1820 to 1827.

He was born in Quebec City, the son of François Bélanger and Charlotte Delâge. Bélanger was commissioned as a notary in 1805 and practised in Quebec City until his death. He served as a captain in the militia during the War of 1812 and also was a justice of the peace. He was married twice: first to Reine Gauvreau in 1806 and then to Geneviève-Luce Robitaille in 1826. Bélanger died in office in Quebec City at the age of 44.
