= François Bellet =

Canadian politician

François Bellet (November 2, 1750 – February 19, 1827) was a ship's captain, merchant and political figure in Lower Canada. He represented York and then Buckingham in the Assembly of Lower Canada from 1810 to 1820 as a member of the Parti canadien.

He was born in Quebec City, the son of François Bellet and Marie-Anne Réaume. Bellet was a navigator on the Saint Lawrence River; he also served as assistant examiner of pilots for the Port of Quebec. He took part in the defence of Quebec during the American Revolution. Bellet owned the schooner Magdelaine. He became involved in the acquisition and sale of property in the Quebec City area. Bellet was also one of the owners of the Imprimerie Canadienne, which published Le Canadien. He was an unsuccessful candidate for a seat in the provincial assembly in 1804 and 1809. Bellet was a warden for Trinity House of Quebec, a warden for Notre-Dame cathedral and an inspector for the Quebec Fire Society. He was married three times: to Cécile Flamme in 1773; to Marie-Honoré Fournier in 1817; and to Mary Robinson in 1822. He died at the Hôpital Général in Quebec City at the age of 76.
