= Claude Dénéchau =

Canadian politician

Claude Dénéchau (March 8, 1768 – October 30, 1836) was a businessman and political figure in Lower Canada.

He was born in Quebec City in 1768, the son of surgeon Jacques Dénéchaud. He went into business with his brother Pierre at Quebec, later entering the import-export on his own. In 1800, he married Marianne-Josette, the daughter of seigneur Jacques-Hyacinthe Simon, dit Delorme. In the same year, he became a member of the Freemasons. After her death, he married Adélaïde, the daughter of Louis Gauvreau in 1807. In 1808, he was named justice of the peace for Quebec district. In the same year, he was elected to the Legislative Assembly of Lower Canada for the Upper Town of Quebec and represented it in the assembly as a member of the English party until July 1820. He was a captain in the local militia during the War of 1812, becoming lieutenant-colonel in 1828. In 1813, he leased the seigneury of Bellechasse from the nuns of the Hôpital Général of Quebec and settled at the manor house at Berthier. He became a partner in a toll bridge across the Rivière du Sud in 1818. He served as commissioner for the trial of small causes at Berthier and was also president of the Quebec Fire Society. Dénéchau was a member of the freemasons and became provincial grand master for the districts of Quebec and Trois-Rivières in 1820. He was secretary-treasurer of the Union Company of Quebec, which operated the Union Hotel at Quebec.

He died of a stroke at Berthier in 1836. During the last year of his life, he had renounced freemasonry and he was buried in the local church.

His daughter Eulalie-Antoinette married physician Marc-Pascal de Sales Laterrière and his daughter Zoé-Louise married physician Olivier Robitaille, who later became a mayor of Quebec City.
