= George Garden (politician) =

Canadian politician

George Garden (c.1772 – October 15, 1828) was a Scottish-born businessman and political figure in Lower Canada. He represented Montreal West in the Legislative Assembly of Lower Canada from 1820 to 1824.

He came to Quebec from Glasgow in 1793 and became partner in a firm involved in importing and exporting goods. He also became an agent for the Phoenix Assurance Company of London. Garden married Euphemia Forbes. He was one of the founders of the Bank of Montreal and served as one of its directors and as a vice-president. Garden was also part of the group involved in the construction of the Lachine Canal. He served as a captain in the militia during the War of 1812; Garden was also a governor of the Montreal General Hospital and a justice of the peace for Montreal. He died in Montreal at the age of 56.
