= Augustin Perrault =

Canadian politician

Augustin Perrault (May 16, 1779 – August 27, 1859) was a woodworker, merchant and political figure in Lower Canada. He represented York in the Legislative Assembly of Lower Canada from 1820 to 1824.

He was born in Saint-François, the son of Jean-Jacques Perrault and Louise Saint-Onge, and established himself in business in Montreal. Perrault served as lieutenant in the militia during the War of 1812. He participated in the founding of the Merchants Bank in 1846. Perrault did not run for reelection to the assembly in 1824. He served on the municipal council for Montreal from 1835 to 1836. He was married three times: first to Marie-Louise Dubuc in 1805, then to Marie-Catherine-Hélène Parthenais in 1807 and finally to Agathe Gaudry in 1822. Perrault died in Montreal at the age of 80 and was buried in the Notre Dame des Neiges Cemetery.
