= Jean-Baptiste Fortin =

Canadian politician

Jean-Baptiste Fortin (December 29, 1764 – January 6, 1841) was a farmer and political figure in Lower Canada. He represented Devon from 1804 to 1814 and from 1820 to 1830 and L'Islet from 1830 to 1838 in the Legislative Assembly of Lower Canada.

He was born in L'Islet, Quebec, the son of Charles Fortin and Marie-Magdelaine Pin. He was involved in the development and settlement of land in the seigneury of L'Islet and was also a commissioner for the construction of roads in the neighbouring seigneuries. In 1788, he married Geneviève Fortin, a relative. Fortin generally supported the Parti canadien and then the Parti patriote and voted in support of the Ninety-Two Resolutions. He died in office at the age of 76.

His grandson Louis-Napoléon Fortin served in the Quebec legislative assembly.
