= Jacques Deligny =

Canadian politician

Jacques Deligny (ca 1776 – January 2, 1837) was a farmer, merchant and political figure in Lower Canada. He represented Warwick from 1814 to 1820 and from 1820 to 1830, and Berthier from 1830 to 1837.

He was born in Quebec City, the son of François Deligny and Marie-Anne Gély. Deligny worked as a potter there and then moved to Berthier around 1802. He served in the militia during the War of 1812, later reaching the rank of major. Later during his time in office, he supported the Parti canadien, later the Parti patriote, and voted for the Ninety-Two Resolutions. In 1799, he married Françoise Langevin, the sister of Charles Langevin. He died in office at Berthier around the age of 60.

His daughter Léocadie married David Morrison Armstrong.
