= François Fournier (Lower Canada politician) =

Canadian politician

François Fournier (1776 – October 18, 1836) was a land surveyor and political figure in Lower Canada. He represented Devon in the Legislative Assembly of Lower Canada from 1814 to 1824.

He was born in Saint-Jean-Port-Joli, the son of Louis Fournier and Madeleine Jean, probably on June 2, 1776. He studied as a land surveyor and received his commission in 1799. Fournier was also a captain and later major in the militia and served as a justice of the peace. In 1804, he married Catherine Miville-Deschênes. He did not run for reelection in 1824. Fournier died in Saint-Jean-Port-Joli at the age of 60.

His son Charles-François served in the assembly for the Province of Canada.
