= Étienne-Claude Lagueux =

Canadian politician

Étienne-Claude Lagueux (October 1765 – August 3, 1842) was a merchant and political figure in Lower Canada. He represented Northumberland in the Legislative Assembly of Lower Canada from 1814 to 1824 and from 1827 to 1830.

He was born Claude-Joseph Lagueux in Cap-Saint-Ignace, the son of Pierre Lagueux and Marie Tremblay. In 1789, he married Cécile Grihault dit Larivière. Lagueux did not run for reelection in 1824 or in 1830. He died in Quebec City at the age of 76.

His nephew Louis Lagueux also served in the assembly. His wife's sister Angèle married John Cannon, another member of the assembly.

== See also ==
- Étienne-Claude Lagueux in France
