= Joseph Valois =

Canadian politician

Joseph Valois (French pronunciation: [ʒozɛf valwa]; 1767 – January 3, 1835) was a businessman, farmer and political figure in Lower Canada. He represented Montréal in the Legislative Assembly of Lower Canada from 1820 to 1834.

He was born in Pointe-Claire, Quebec, the son of Jean Valois and Marie-Josèphe Dubois. In 1790, he married Catherine Leduc Saint-Omer. Valois generally supported the Parti patriote and voted in support of the Ninety-Two Resolutions. He died in Montreal at the age of 67.

His nephew Michel-François Valois later served in the legislative assembly for the Province of Canada.
