= Hugues Heney =

Canadian politician

Hugues Heney (September 9, 1789 – January 13, 1844) was a lawyer and political figure in Lower Canada.

He was born in Montreal in 1789, the grandson of Pierre Foretier, and studied at the Collège Saint-Raphaël. Heney articled with Joseph Bédard in Montreal, was called to the bar in 1811 and set up practice in Montreal. He served in the local militia during the War of 1812 as lieutenant and then adjutant. In 1815, he was named justice of the peace. In 1817, Heney married his cousin Marie-Léocadie, daughter of Louis-Charles Foucher and Marie-Élizabeth Foretier.

In April 1820, he was elected to the Legislative Assembly of Lower Canada for Montreal East. He was part of the opposition to a plan to unite Upper and Lower Canada in 1822. Heney served in the assembly until 1832, generally voting with the parti canadien; following his resignation, he was named clerk for the assembly. Also in 1832, he was named chief road commissioner for Trois-Rivières district. In 1833, he was named to the Executive Council for the province. He was named commissioner for the trial of small causes in 1836. In 1842, Heney was named to a commission to revise the statutes of Lower Canada.

He died at Trois-Rivières in 1844.
