= Étienne Duchesnois =

Canadian politician

Étienne Duchesnois (July 9, 1765 – December 16, 1826) was a merchant and political figure in Lower Canada. He represented Surrey in the Legislative Assembly of Lower Canada from 1814 to 1824.

He was born in Berthier, the son of Étienne Duchesnois and Catherine-Françoise Leroux. Duchesnois established himself in business at Varennes. He was also a justice of the peace and a major in the militia. In 1797, he married Josette Massue, the daughter of the seigneur of Varennes, Gaspard Massue, and the sister of Aignan-Aimé Massue and Louis Massue. Duchesnois did not run for reelection in 1824. He died two years later in Varennes at the age of 61.
