= François Quirouet =

Canadian politician

François Quirouet (February 28, 1776 – September 27, 1844) was a businessman and political figure in Lower Canada.

He was born Pierre-François Quirouet in the town of Quebec in 1776. He served in the militia, later becoming lieutenant-colonel. He was a merchant and was also licensed as an auctioneer. With his brother Olivier and Martin Chinic, he operated an importing business. Quirouet was also a member of the Quebec Benevolent Society, serving as its president for several years. He served as a director for the Bank of Montreal at Quebec and was later vice-president of the Quebec Savings Bank. He was a justice of the peace and served as president of the Quebec Fire Society. Quirouet was elected to the Legislative Assembly of Lower Canada for Orléans in April 1820 and served until 1833, when he was named to the Legislative Council. He opposed the proposed union of Upper and Lower Canada in 1822. He supported Louis-Joseph Papineau in the assembly but opposed motions introduced which criticized the usefulness of the legislative council and did not support the armed rebellion which followed. His niece married Charles Drolet in 1830; in 1838, he had Drolet arrested by the militia when Drolet stopped at the Quirouet home on his way to the United States.

Quirouet died at Saint-Gervais in 1844.
