= Robert Jones (Lower Canada politician) =

Lower Canada politician, born 1770

Robert Jones (c. 1770 – September 24, 1844) was a political figure in Lower Canada. He represented William Henry in the Legislative Assembly of Lower Canada from 1814 to 1824.

He was probably born in New York state, the son of John Jones, a quartermaster of Welsh origin in the British army. In 1793, he replaced his father as guardian of the barracks at William Henry. Jones was administrator for the seigneury of Sorel from 1798 to 1806. He served as an officer in the militia, later becoming battalion commander, and also served as a justice of the peace. Jones was defeated when he ran for reelection to the assembly in 1824 and again in 1830. He died in William Henry, later known as Sorel.

His brother John Jones also served in the Lower Canada assembly and his nephew Robert Jones served in the assembly for the Province of Canada.
