= John Davidson (Lower Canada politician) =

Canadian politician

John Davidson (before 1794 – 1838 or later) was a merchant, civil servant and political figure in Lower Canada. He represented Dorchester in the Legislative Assembly of Lower Canada from 1814 to 1827.

He was a militia officer, first serving in the Quebec division as a major in 1812 and then moving to the Lotbinière division in 1813. He established himself in business at Quebec City. Davidson served as a member of the board of examination for flour inspectors, as a justice of the peace, as inspector of forests, as Clerk of the Crown in Chancery and as commissioner with respect to the department of crown lands. He was opposed to the proposed union of Upper and Lower Canada in 1822. Davidson did not run for reelection to the assembly in 1827.
