= Jacques Trullier, dit Lacombe =

Canadian politician

Jacques Trullier, dit Lacombe (c. 1763 – December 5, 1821) was a businessman and politician in Lower Canada. He represented Leinster in 1814 and then from 1816 to 1821 as a member of the Parti canadien.

He was born, probably in Boucherville, the son of Jacques Trullier, dit Lacombe and Marie-Anne Levasseur, and studied in Montreal. In 1788, he married Angélique Laurent. Sometime between then and 1794, he established himself as a merchant in L'Assomption, involved in the grain trade and potash production. He also constructed several houses there and operated an inn. Trullier, dit Lacombe was a justice of the peace and served as a major in the militia during the War of 1812. His election in 1814 was appealed on the grounds that he had bought votes and put pressure on voters who owed him money; he was disqualified following an investigation. Michel Prévost won the subsequent by-election. Trullier, dit Lacombe died in office at L'Assomption at the age of 56.
