= François Huot =

Canadian politician (1756–1822)

François Huot (August 23, 1756 – January 29, 1822) was a businessman and political figure in Lower Canada.

He was born Pierre-François Huot at Sainte-Foy in 1756, the son of a farmer. He is thought to have been employed as a servant before setting up a shop at Quebec City. Huot sold fabrics, clothing and other household goods. He was elected to the Legislative Assembly of Lower Canada in Hampshire in 1796 and except for the period 1804 to 1808, when he stood aside to allow Joseph-Bernard Planté to be elected, served until his death at Quebec City in 1822. He also invested in real estate and served as a director of the Quebec Fire Society. Huot was a share-holder in the Union Company of Quebec, which operated the Union Hotel.

He married Françoise Villers, the widow of Jean Bergevin, dit Langevin in 1801, becoming the stepfather of Charles Langevin, who also represented Hampshire in the legislative assembly. Huot and Villers' son Hector-Simon became a lawyer and also served in the legislative assembly.
