= Louis Lagueux =

Canadian politician

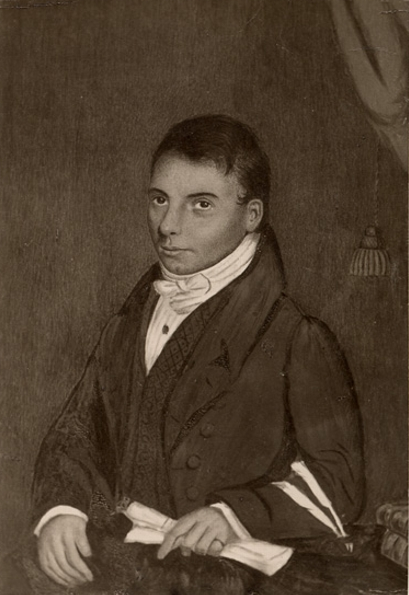

Member of the Legislative Assembly of Lower Canada for Dorchester

Personal details
- Born: November 20, 1793 Quebec City, Lower Canada
- Died: June 15, 1832 (aged 38) Quebec City, Lower Canada

Louis Lagueux (November 20, 1793 – June 15, 1832) was a lawyer and political figure in Lower Canada.

He was born in the town of Quebec in 1793, the son of merchant Louis Lagueux and Louise Bégin, whose father Charles Bégin served in the legislative assembly. Lagueux studied at the Petit Séminaire de Québec, articled in law with Joseph-Rémi Vallières de Saint-Réal and qualified to practice in 1817. That same year, he entered the importing business with a partner; after that business failed the following year, he returned to the practice of law. In 1820, he was elected to the Legislative Assembly of Lower Canada for Dorchester; he represented the riding until his death at Quebec from cholera in 1832. During his time in the assembly, he supported the Parti canadien. In 1830, he introduced a bill incorporating the city of Quebec.

His uncle Étienne-Claude Lagueux also served in the legislative assembly.
