= Joseph Robitaille =

Canadian politician

Joseph Robitaille (November 15, 1766 – April 29, 1854) was a miller, farmer, and political figure in Lower Canada. He represented Cornwallis in the Legislative Assembly of Lower Canada from 1808 to 1830, initially as a supporter of the Parti canadien and later of the Parti patriote.

He was born in Ancienne-Lorette to Romain Robitaille and Marie-Josephte Drolet. Robitaille lived in the Saint-Louis parish of Kamouraska, before later moving to Saint-Pascal. He was married twice: first to Marie-Rosalie Gagnon in 1799, and then later to Élisabeth Falardeau. He did not seek reelection to the assembly in 1830. Robitaille died at Saint-Pascal at the age of 87.
