= Nicolas-Eustache Lambert Dumont =

Canadian politician

Nicolas-Eustache Lambert Dumont (September 25, 1767 – April 25, 1835) was a seigneur, judge and political figure in Lower Canada.

He was born in Trois-Rivières in 1767, the son of the seigneur of Mille-Îles. He served as a major in the local militia and became lieutenant-colonel in 1807. He purchased the seigneury of Île-à-la-Fourche and inherited the seigneury of Nicolet from an aunt. Lambert Dumont's residence was at Saint-Eustache. In 1800, he was named justice of the peace. In 1804, he was elected to the Legislative Assembly of Lower Canada for York County; he was reelected in 1814 and served until 1827. During his time in office, he generally tended to support the British authorities but sometimes supported the Parti canadien when it suited his interests. In 1810, he established a settlement on the Du Nord River which later became Saint-Jérôme. Lambert Dumont was apparently qualified as an engineer and surveyor and is believed to have constructed several bridges in the region. In 1821, he was named judge for the trial of small causes in York County.

Nicolas-Eustache Lambert Dumont was married for the first time to Marie-narcisse Lemaire St-Germain, and for the second time to Sophie Ménéclier de Montrochon.

He died at Saint-Eustache in 1835.

His grandson, Godefroy Laviolette, was the first mayor of Saint-Jérôme from 1856 to 1874, and he was reelected from 1879 to 1881, and from 1888 to 1889.
