= Pierre Amiot =

Canadian politician

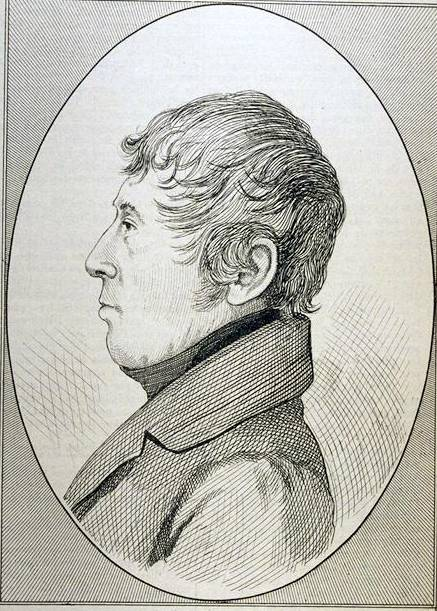

Pierre Amiot (French: [pjɛʁ amjo]; March 9, 1781 – January 31, 1839) was a farmer, businessman and political figure in Lower Canada. He represented Surrey from 1813 to 1830 and then Verchères from 1830 to 1838 in the Legislative Assembly of Lower Canada.

He was born in Verchères, Quebec, the son of Joseph Amiot and Archange Brousseau. He was married twice: to Charlotte Brin in 1804 and to Marie-Archange Chagnon dit Larose in 1807. Amiot was a captain in the militia; he was removed from that post in 1827 because of his opposition to Governor George Ramsay, then reinstated in 1830 and removed again in 1837. In the legislative assembly, he supported the Parti canadien and then the Parti patriote and voted in favour of the Ninety-Two Resolutions. Amiot took part in the Battle of Saint-Charles in 1837 and was arrested in December of that year; he was released in July 1838 as part of a general amnesty. He died at Verchères at the age of 57.
