= Louis Gauvreau =

Canadian politician

Member of the Legislative Assembly of Lower Canada Assembly for Quebec County, Quebec
- In office 1810–1822

Personal details
- Born: May 11, 1761 Petite-Rivière-Saint-Charles, Quebec, Lower Canada
- Died: August 16, 1822 (aged 61) Quebec City, Lower Canada
- Party: Parti canadien
- Spouses: Marie-Louise Beleau (m. 1783; died 1805) Josette Vanfelson (m. 1805)

Louis Gauvreau (May 11, 1761 – August 16, 1822) was a businessman and political figure in Lower Canada.

== Biography ==
He was born in Petite-Rivière-Saint-Charles near Quebec City in 1761 and studied at Quebec. He owned a general store and was also involved in lumber, wholesale trade, real estate and money-lending. In 1815, he purchased the fief of Grosse-Île and, in 1817, a large part of the seigneury of Rivière-du-Sud. Gauvreau was also a member of the Quebec Fire Society. In 1783, he had married Marie-Louise Beleau. In 1805, after her death, he married Josette Vanfelson, the sister of lawyer George Vanfelson. He was elected to the Legislative Assembly of Lower Canada for Quebec County in 1810; he represented that region in the assembly until his death at Quebec City in 1822. In the assembly, he often supported the parti canadien but held his own views and voted accordingly.

His daughter Adélaïde married Claude Dénéchau, who also served in the legislative assembly, and his daughter Marie-Reine-Josephte married Sir Narcisse-Fortunat Belleau, who became a premier of the Province of Canada and Lieutenant-Governor of Quebec.
