= François Blanchet (physician) =

Canadian physician and politician

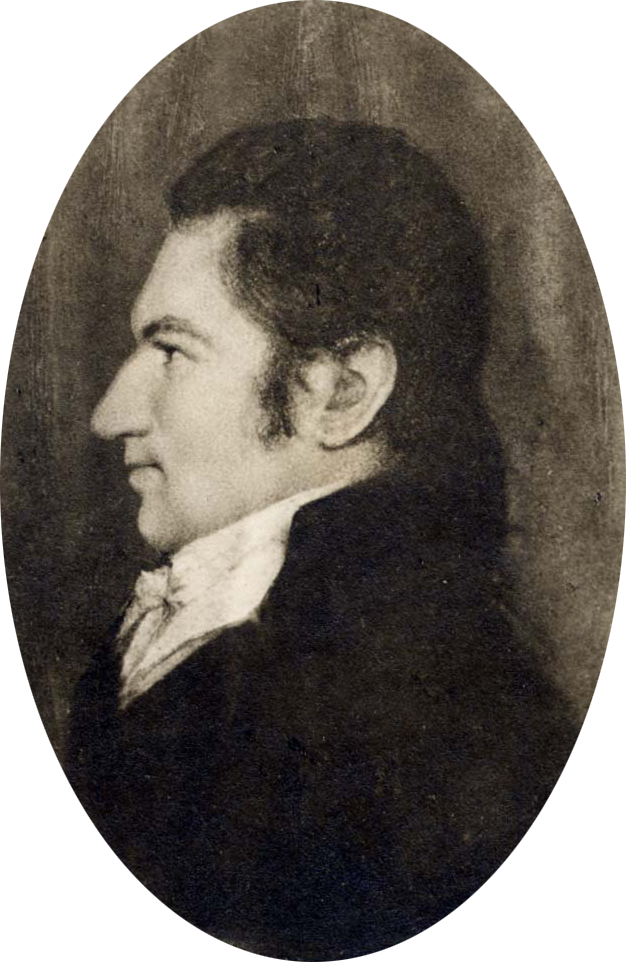
François Blanchet Portrait

François Blanchet (April 3, 1776 – June 24, 1830) was a medical doctor, businessman, seigneur and political figure in Lower Canada.

He was born in Saint-Pierre-de-la-Rivière-du-Sud in 1776 and studied at the Petit Séminaire of Quebec. He went on to study medicine with James Fisher and then at Columbia College, where he received a Bachelor of Medicine. In 1801, he was elected as a member to the American Philosophical Society. Later that year, he returned to Lower Canada and passed an exam to allow him to practice as a physician and surgeon. He married Catherine-Henriette, the daughter of seigneur Antoine Juchereau Duchesnay, in 1802 and set up practice in Quebec City. He was named as a surgeon for the militia in 1805. In 1806, he was one of the founders of Le Canadien. Because the newspaper was often critical of the authorities, Blanchet was removed from his post in the militia in 1808.

In 1809, he was elected to the Legislative Assembly of Lower Canada for Hertford County. Governor James Henry Craig jailed him for sedition in 1810. However, Blanchet was re-elected in that year and continued to hold a seat in the assembly until he was defeated in March 1816. Blanchet was re-elected in a subsequent by-election and served until his death in Quebec City in 1830. He was a supporter and speaker for the Parti canadien in the assembly. He was named as a justice of the peace for Quebec district in 1815.

During the War of 1812, Blanchet served as superintendent for military hospitals in Lower Canada. He served on the medical staff and helped manage the Emigrant Hospital. He was a contributor to Quebec Medical Journal/Journal de médecine de Québec, the first medical journal published in Canada and promoted the development of medical education in the province, both as a physician and as a member of the legislative assembly. In 1830, he was named to the board of medical examiners for Quebec district.

Blanchet had inherited property when his father-in-law died; he also purchased additional property from the other heirs and had acquired other land on his own.

His nephew, Jean Blanchet, was also a doctor involved in politics, and his grandson, William Henry Chaffers, served in the Canadian Senate.
