= Jean-Moïse Raymond =

Businessman and politician in Lower Canada (1787–1943)

Member of the Legislative Assembly of Lower Canada for Huntingdon County (two-member constituency)
- In office 1824 – 1830 (two elections) Serving with Austin Cuvillier
- Preceded by: Austin Cuvillier and Michael O'Sullivan
- Succeeded by: District abolished – redistribution

Member of the Legislative Assembly of Lower Canada for La Prairie County (two-member constituency)
- In office 1830 – 1838 (two elections) Serving with: Austin Cuvillier (1830–1834); Joseph-Narcisse Cardinal (1835–1838)
- Preceded by: New district – redistribution
- Succeeded by: None; Constitution suspended

Member of the Legislative Assembly of the Province of Canada for Leinster
- In office 1841–1842
- Preceded by: New position

Personal details
- Born: January 5, 1787
- Died: February 8, 1843 (aged 56)
- Party: Lower Canada: Parti patriote (pre-1837); Province of Canada: Anti-unionist; Groupe canadien-français
- Spouse(s): (1) Archange Denaut (1810–1813 (her death) (2) Angélique Leroux
- Relations: Jean-Baptiste Raymond (father); Laurent Leroux (father-in-law); Tancrède Sauvageau (son-in-law); Jean-Baptiste Varin (son-in-law); Joseph Masson(brother-in-law); Louis-Rodrigue Masson (nephew); Édouard Masson (nephew)
- Children: 13
- Occupation: Businessman

Military service
- Allegiance: Britain
- Branch/service: Lower Canada militia
- Rank: Major
- Battles/wars: War of 1812: Battle of the Châteauguay

Jean-Moïse Raymond (January 5, 1787 – February 8, 1843) was a businessman, militia officer and political figure in Lower Canada, and briefly in Canada East (now Quebec), in the Province of Canada. He was active in a family business inherited from his father, and also served in the Lower Canada militia during the War of 1812, at the Battle of the Châteauguay. As a member of the Legislative Assembly of Lower Canada, he was critical of British government of the province, voting in favour of the Ninety-Two Resolutions, which set out a detailed list of problems with the government. He opposed the union of Lower Canada with Upper Canada. Following the union of those two provinces into the Province of Canada, he was elected to the Legislative Assembly of the new province, but resigned his seat after only one year to take a government appointment. He died in 1843.

== Family and early life ==
Raymond was born in La Tortue (later Saint-Mathieu) in 1787, the son of Jean-Baptiste Raymond, who was likely of Huguenot ancestry. The Raymond family later moved to La Prairie. Jean-Moïse studied at the Collège Saint-Raphaël in Montreal. In 1810, he married Archange Denaut, daughter of a local merchant in La Prairie, but their infant daughter died in 1812 and his wife Archange in 1813. In 1815, he married a second time, to Angélique Leroux, the daughter of Laurent Leroux, who was a very wealthy businessman. The couple had thirteen children, of whom nine lived to adulthood.

His family was active in politics:

- His father was a member of the Legislative Assembly of Lower Canada, for Huntingdon county;
- His father-in-law, Laurent Leroux, was also a member of the Lower Canada Assembly, for Leinster county;
- His daughter Marie-Clotilde married Tancrède Sauvageau, who was the member of the Legislative Assembly of the Province of Canada for Huntingdon from 1848 to 1851;
- Another daughter, Hermine, married Jean-Baptiste Varin, who followed Sauvageau as the member for Huntingdon from 1851 to 1854;
- His brother-in-law, Joseph Masson, was a member of the Legislative Council of Lower Canada;
- His nephew, Louis-François-Rodrigue Masson, served in the Canadian House of Commons, the Senate, and the Legislative Council of Quebec, and was lieutenant-governor of Quebec.
- Another nephew, Édouard Masson, was a member of the Legislative Council of the Province of Canada.

== Business career ==
By 1810, Raymond had entered his father's business in manufacturing and the sale of goods. His father was disabled from injuries sustained as a young boy on a fur-trading expedition, and became chronically ill. Raymond became more and more responsible for the daily operation of the business, now called Jean-Baptiste Raymond et Fils. They were involved in processing potash, sawmilling, and the sale of household and manufactured goods to local farmers in return for wheat. He was also involved in real estate. Raymond took full control of the business on his father's death in 1825 and was a prosperous businessman. That changed in the late 1830s, when a combination of wheat blights, an economic downturn, and property damage as a result of the Lower Canada Rebellion interrupted his business. In 1838 he sold the business and moved to L'Assomption. He opened a whisky distillery, but continued to have financial difficulties.

== Militia service ==
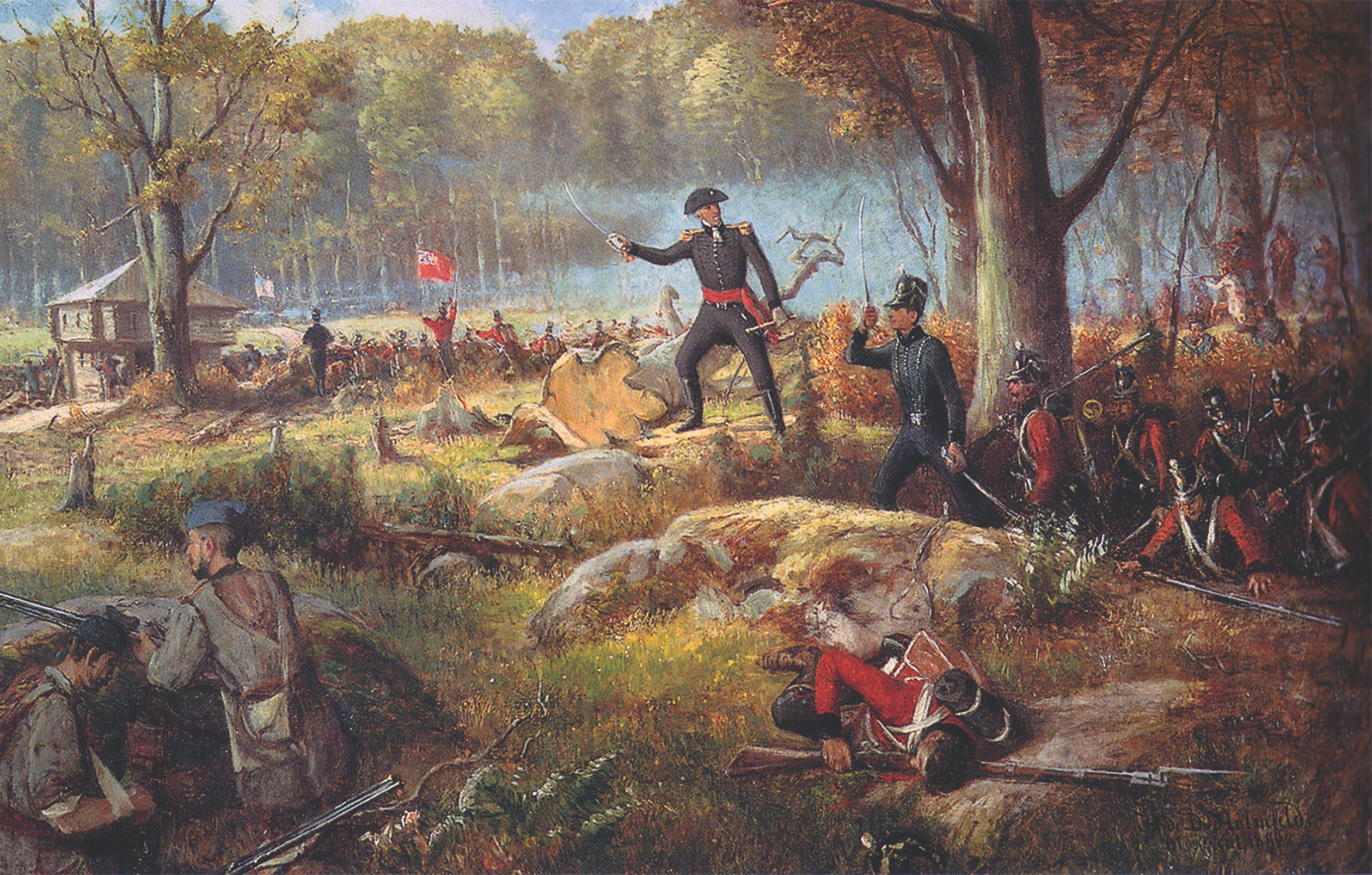
Battle of the Châteauguay

In October 1813, Raymond was appointed a major in the Lower Canada militia, commanding two companies of the Boucherville militia battalion. His units were called into service later that month, as part of the Canadian and First Nations forces at the Battle of the Châteauguay, which prevented an invading American army from capturing Montreal.

== Political career ==
=== Lower Canada ===
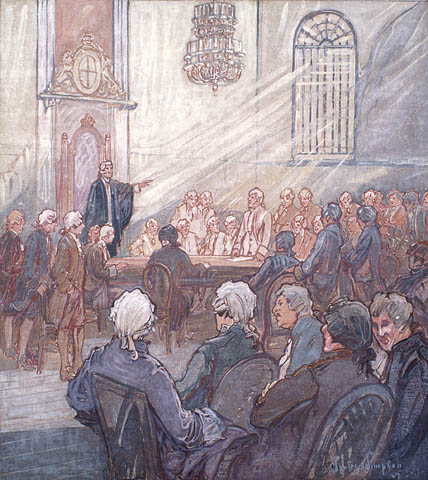
Parliament of Lower Canada meeting in the Bishop's chapel, Quebec

In 1822, Raymond was part of a group, organised in part by Louis-Joseph Papineau, which opposed a proposal to unite Lower Canada with Upper Canada (now Ontario). His father, Jean-Baptiste Raymond, was the chair of a meeting in Huntingdon, called in opposition to the union; Jean-Moïse acted as the secretary. In the general election of 1824, Jean-Moïse was elected to the Legislative Assembly for Huntingdon county, the same seat his father had held twenty years earlier, and re-elected in 1927. Following a redistribution of seats, he represented La Prairie County, formerly part of Huntingdon, from 1830 to 1838, in two general elections. He held the seat until the dissolution of the provincial constitution in 1838.

In the Assembly, Raymond was a regular supporter of Papineau and the Parti canadien, known as the Parti patriote from 1926 onwards. He voted in support of the Ninety-Two Resolutions, a Papineau initiative, setting out their opposition of the Lower Canada government set up by the British government, and demanding more popular control, such as replacing the appointed Legislative Council (the upper house in the provincial Parliament) with an elected body. He was named justice of the peace for Montreal district and also served as school inspector. Raymond was not a radical, however, and does not appear to have supported those who took up arms against the provincial government in the Lower Canada Rebellion.

=== Province of Canada ===
Following the rebellion in Lower Canada, and the similar rebellion in 1837 in Upper Canada (now Ontario), the British government decided to merge the two provinces into a single province, as recommended by Lord Durham in the Durham Report. The Union Act, 1840, passed by the British Parliament, abolished the two provinces and their separate parliaments, and created the Province of Canada, with a single parliament for the entire province, composed of an elected Legislative Assembly and an appointed Legislative Council. The Governor General retained a strong position in the government.

The Union Act came into force in early 1841. The first general election was held that spring and Raymond stood for election in the Leinster electoral district in the new Legislative Assembly. He was elected unopposed. In the first session, Raymond voted against the union of the Canadas and generally opposed the Governor General, Lord Sydenham. He was part of the informal Groupe canadien-français.

== Resignation and death ==
Raymond did not sit in the subsequent sessions of the first Parliament. He resigned his seat effective January 1, 1842 to become District Registrar for Leinster County, possibly for financial reasons. In 1843, he suffered a short but violent illness and died in Saint-Jacques-de-l'Achigan.

== See also ==
1st Parliament of the Province of Canada
