= Michael O'Sullivan (politician) =

Irish-born lawyer, militia officer and politician

Member of the Legislative Assembly of Lower Canada for Huntingdon county (two‑member constituency)
- In office 1814 – 1824 (4 elections) Serving with Austin Cuvillier
- Preceded by: Jean-Antoine Panet / Edme Henry
- Succeeded by: Austin Cuvillier / Jean-Moïse Raymond

Solicitor General for Lower Canada
- In office 1833–1838

Chief Justice of the Court of Queen's Bench for the district of Montreal
- In office 1838–1839

Personal details
- Born: May 4, 1784 Clonmel, Ireland
- Died: March 7, 1839 (aged 54) Montreal, Lower Canada
- Resting place: Notre-Dame Basilica, Montreal
- Party: Parti canadien
- Spouses: Cécile Berthelet (m. 1809; died 1811); Jeanne-Marie-Catherine Bruyères (m. 1831)
- Relations: Pierre Berthelet (father-in-law); Antoine-Olivier Berthelet (brother-in-law); René-Joseph Kimber (brother-in-law)
- Education: Collège Saint-Raphaël
- Profession: Lawyer

Military service
- Allegiance: Lower Canada
- Branch/service: Canadian Militia
- Rank: Lieutenant and aide-de-camp to Lieutenant-Colonel Charles-Michel d'Irumberry de Salaberry (1813); Major (1830)
- Unit: 2nd Battalion, Beauharnois Sedentary Militia; 1st Militia Battalion, Montreal
- Battles/wars: War of 1812; Battle of the Châteauguay
- Awards: Mentioned in dispatches for bravery

Michael O'Sullivan (May 4, 1784 – March 7, 1839) was an Irish-born lawyer, militia officer, politician and judge who spent most of his life in Lower Canada. Born in Clonmel, Ireland, he emigrated to Lower Canada as a child and was educated at the Collège Saint-Raphaël, where he began a life-long association with the Roman Catholic Sulpician order. He became a prominent member of the bar of Lower Canada, as well as a member of the Legislative Assembly of Lower Canada and Solicitor-general for Lower Canada.

O'Sullivan was an officer in the Lower Canada militia during the War of 1812. He participated in the Battle of the Châteauguay as aide-de-camp to Lieutenant-Colonel Charles de Salaberry, the commander of the Canadian and Mohawk forces who were defending Lower Canada from an invading American force. O'Sullivan was mentioned in dispatches for bravery after the battle, and subsequently wrote a contemporary account of the battle which has become the basis for understanding the battle.

O’Sullivan was elected to the Legislative Assembly of Lower Canada in 1814 and remained in office until 1824. He generally supported the Parti canadien, but gradually moved away from it as it became more nationalist. During his time as a member of the Legislative Assembly, O'Sullivan was vocal in his opposition to building a new, non-denominational, hospital in Montreal; his outspokenness on the matter culminated in his fighting a duel with a Montreal doctor, William Caldwell, who supported the proposal. The hospital was ultimately built.

In November 1838, O'Sullivan was appointed the Chief Justice of the Court of Queen's Bench in Montreal, but died in March 1839 at the age of 54.

== Family and early life ==
O'Sullivan was born in Clonmel, Ireland, to John O'Sullivan and Eleonora O'Donel, who were related to prominent figures in County Tipperary. He emigrated to Lower Canada as a child, and was enrolled in the Collège Saint-Raphaël in Montreal from 1799 to 1806. The Collège was run by the Sulpician order, and his attendance began a life-long connection with the Sulpicians. He was recognised as a gifted student and finished at the top of his class. Other students in the class also went on to play leading roles in the nationalist politics of Lower Canada, such as Hugues Heney, André Jobin, and Jean-Moïse Raymond.

O'Sullivan was married twice. His first marriage, on June 1, 1809, was to Cécile Berthelet, daughter of the prosperous merchant and real estate owner, Pierre Berthelet, and his wife Marguerite Viger. One brother-in-law from his first marriage, Antoine-Olivier Berthelet, was briefly a member of the Legislative Assembly, from 1832 to 1834. Another brother-in-law, René-Joseph Kimber, was also a member of the Legislative Assembly. However, that marriage was short, ending with Cécile's death in 1811. He did not marry again for twenty years, until his second marriage to Jeanne-Marie-Catherine Bruyères, a widow, on May 17, 1831. Both marriages linked O'Sullivan to well-established members of the French-speaking community in Montreal.

== Militia service: Battle of the Châteauguay ==
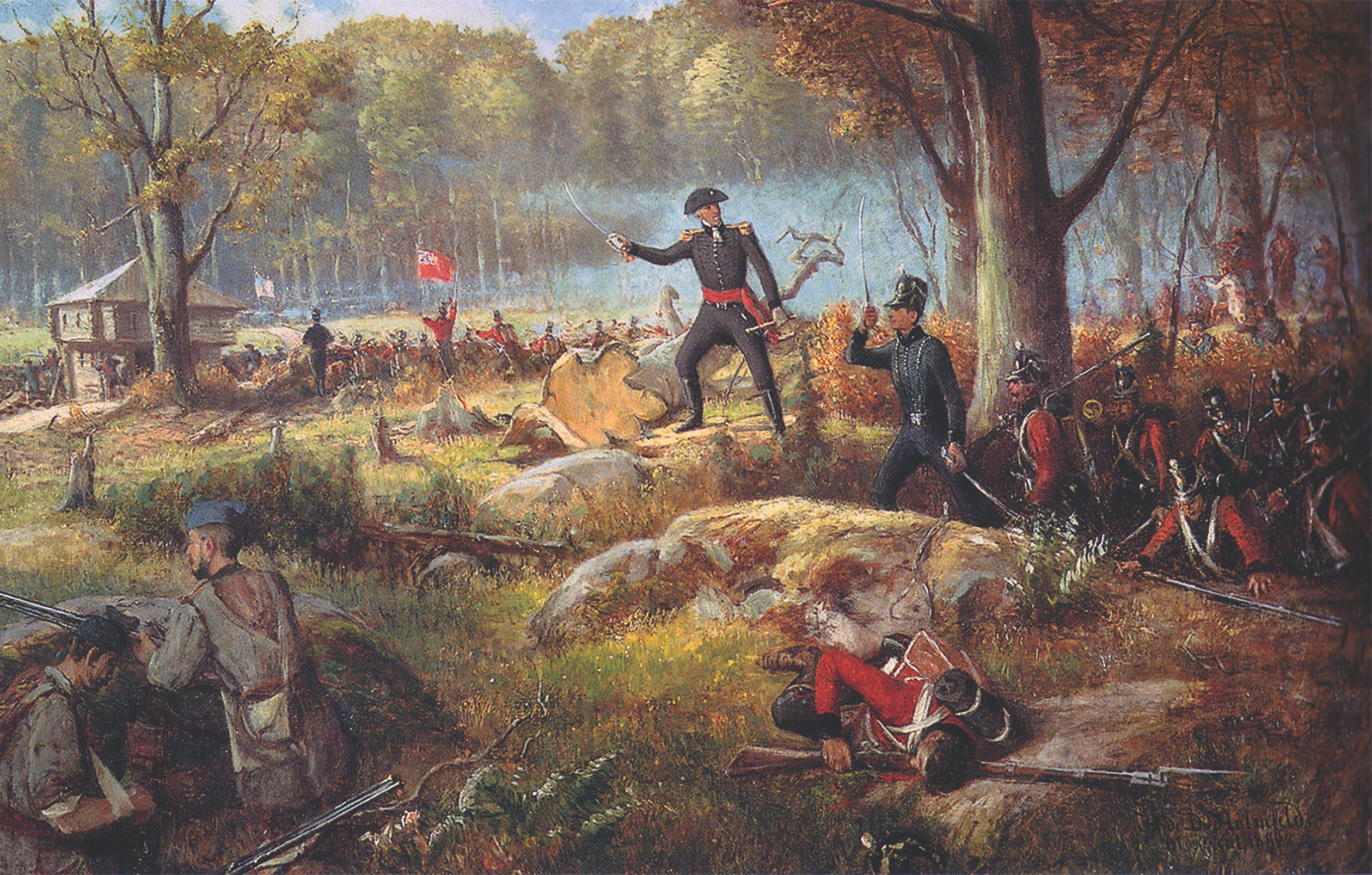
Battle of the Châteauguay

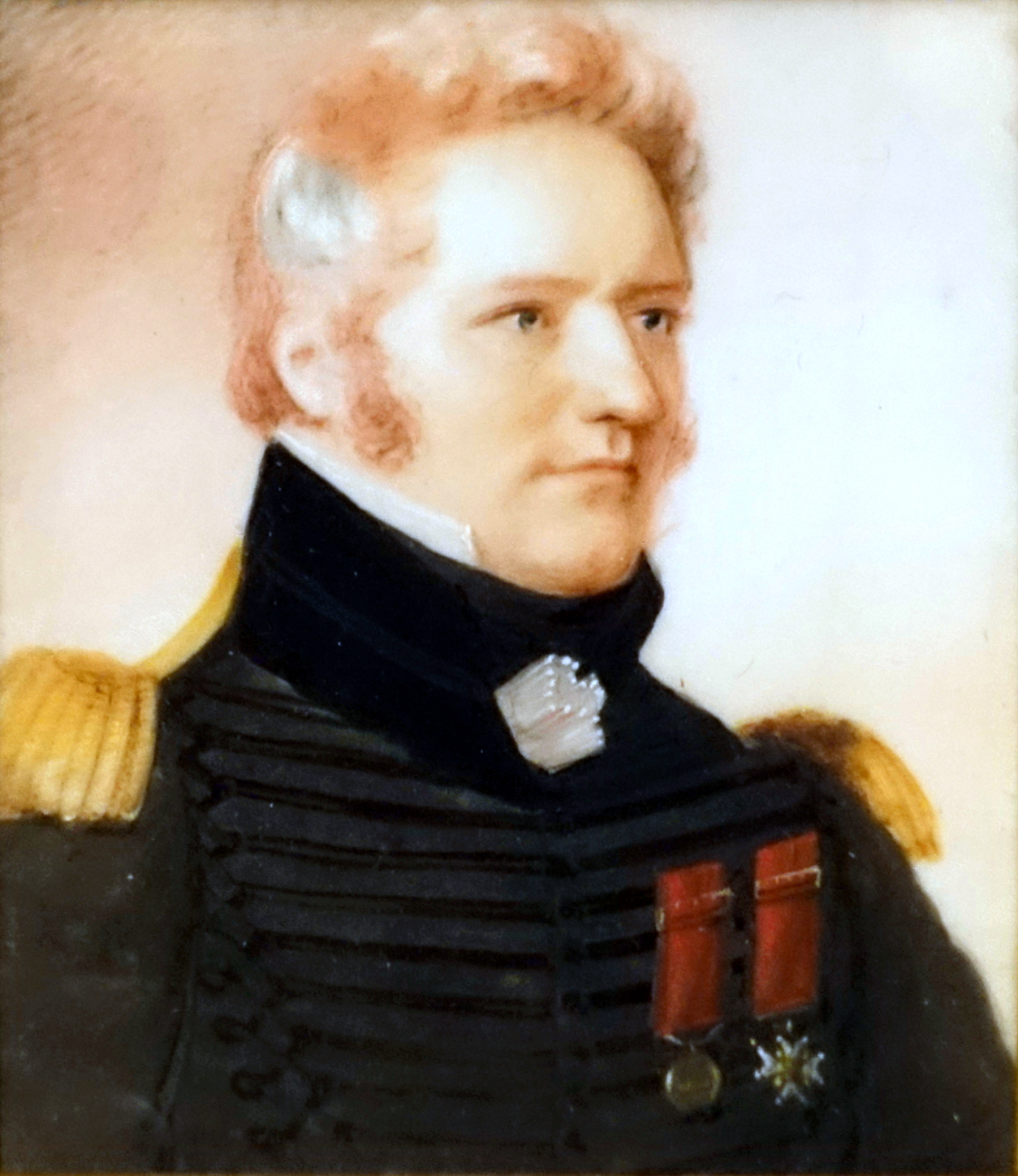
Lieutenant Colonel de Salaberry, commander of the Canadian forces

During the War of 1812, O'Sullivan participated in the Battle of the Châteauguay, which saved Montreal from an invading American force. The battle took place at the junction of the Châteauguay River and the English River. The Canadian regular and militia units and Mohawk warriors were under the command of Lieutenant Colonel de Salaberry. They were outnumbered, but de Salaberry built up defensive positions with his forces protected by the dense woods, and trees and brushwood which they cut down. In a short battle, the Americans gave way and retreated, preserving Montreal from capture. The outcome of the battle had great strategic significance, since the capture of Montreal would have cut off Upper Canada from supply and communications with Lower Canada and Great Britain.

O'Sullivan was a lieutenant in a Beauharnois battalion of the Lower Canada militia, and served as aide-de-camp to de Salaberry. The Beauharnois battalions were heavily engaged in the battle. De Salaberry mentioned him in dispatches following the battle, praising O'Sullivan's bravery.

After the battle, a dispute arose about the role played by the Governor General, Sir George Prevost, and Major-General Louis de Watteville. Neither Prevost nor de Watteville had been present at the battle, but stories began to spread that the victory was due to their leadership. Lieutenant Colonel George Macdonell, who had been in command of the reserve at Châteauguay, also began to claim credit. In response, a pseudonymous letter appeared in the Montreal Gazette on November 9, 1813, written by a "témoin oculaire" ("eye-witness"), confirming the impressive role and command decisions played by de Salaberry, and asserting that the victory was due entirely to the Canadians. Subsequent research has indicated that the témoin oculaire was O'Sullivan. Some years later, Étienne-Paschal Taché, also a veteran of the battle, confirmed that O'Sullivan had written the letter. There was also an exchange of correspondence between O'Sullivan and de Salaberry shortly after the letter was published, which showed that he was the author. O'Sullivan's account of de Salaberry's role has become the accepted understanding of the battle.

O'Sullivan stayed in the militia after the War of 1812 was over. In 1830, he was promoted to major, on transferring to 1st Militia Battalion of Montreal.

== Legal career ==
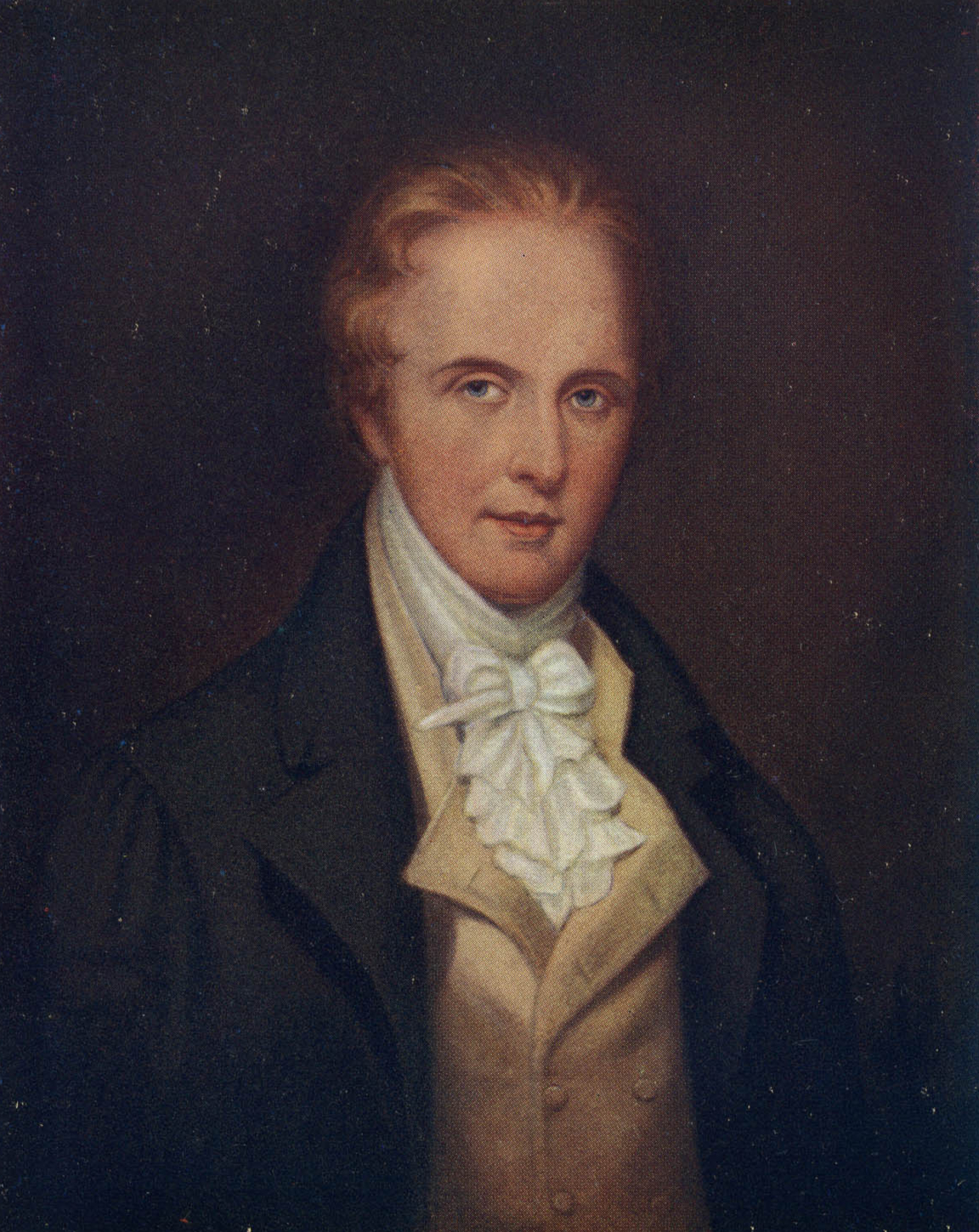
Lord Selkirk, whom O'Sullivan defended on charges resulting from the Pemmican War

After completing his courses at the Collège St-Raphaël, in 1805 O'Sullivan began his legal studies as an articled clerk with Denis-Benjamin Viger, a brilliant young lawyer and future joint-premier of the Province of Canada. He left Viger in 1808 and finished his articles under Stephen Sewell, another leading lawyer in Montreal. O'Sullivan may have made the switch to ensure he was trained in both the civil law under Viger, and the common law under Sewell. Knowing both systems would be an advantage for a lawyer in private practice in Montreal. He was called to the bar of Lower Canada in 1811.

O'Sullivan built a large practice in Montreal and became known as an authority on the law. He began to take in articling students, some of whom went on to distinguished legal careers themselves. In 1818, he was one of a team of lawyers retained to defend Lord Selkirk on charges in relation to the Pemmican War between the Hudson's Bay Company and the North-West Company. Between 1829 and 1831, O'Sullivan had received several public appointments, including the role of commissioner for receiving evidence, and as justice of the peace and King's Counsel. In 1831 and 1832, he served as president of the Advocates Library and Law Institute of Montreal, and gave lectures on topics such as the history of Roman law.

== Political career ==
=== Parti canadien supporter ===
O'Sullivan's first principal, Viger, was a nationalist who supported the Parti canadien, which represented the interests of French-speaking Canadiens. The Parti canadien members of the Assembly opposed the policies of the British governors, who generally favoured the English-speaking merchants and landholders. During his time with Viger, O'Sullivan began writing articles for Le Canadien, a newspaper which supported the nationalist position.

In 1814, O'Sullivan was elected to the two-member constituency of Huntingdon county, south of Montreal, alongside Austin Cuvillier, who would go on to be the first Speaker of the Legislative Assembly of the Province of Canada. O'Sullivan was re-elected in the election of 1817 and the two elections of 1820, but did not stand for re-election in 1824.

In the Assembly, O'Sullivan tended to support the Parti canadien and his friend, James Stuart, which suited his reformist tendencies at that time. However, he was more interested in issues of government administration and judicial matters than the battles over constitutional principles which increasingly occupied the Parti canadien. His decision to leave politics at the 1824 election may have reflected his movement away from the increasingly nationalist tone of the Parti canadien, which became known as the Parti patriote a few years later. A classmate from the Collège St-Raphaël, Jean-Moïse Raymond, was elected in his place in 1824.

=== Sulpician supporter ===
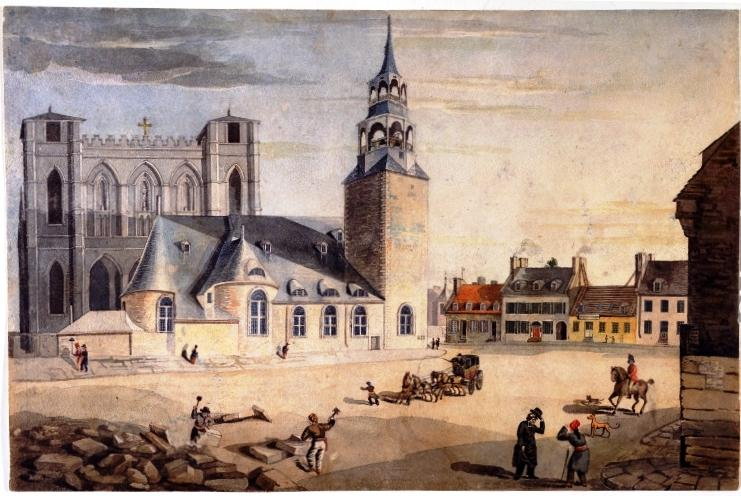
Old Notre-Dame, with the new Notre-Dame Basilica being built behind

O'Sullivan had a lifelong connection with the French Sulpician order of Catholic priests, who had taught him at Collège St-Raphaël. He acted as their lawyer on a number of matters, and also became involved in a dispute over the 1821 appointment of Jean-Jacques Lartigue as the auxiliary and suffragan Bishop of Montreal, acting for the Archbishop of Quebec, Joseph-Octave Plessis. Although Lartigue was also a Sulpician and graduate of Collège St-Raphaël, he was a native canadien. The predominantly French Sulpicians viewed his appointment as an encroachment on their dominance in Montreal, and made life unpleasant for the new suffragan bishop, including one challenge in 1823–1824 to the canonical validity of his appointment. O'Sullivan gave advice on the civil and canon law aspects of the dispute to the person who brought the challenge. He also toured Europe, supposedly on vacation, but in actuality to lobby against the appointment of Lartigue. O'Sullivan may have been involved in the movement to construct the new Notre-Dame Basilica, replacing the old Notre-Dame church, which prevented building a cathedral for the new bishop.

The whole affair also had political implications, as Lartigue was the cousin of both Louis-Joseph Papineau and Viger. Both were ardent nationalists and leading members of the Parti canadien. They supported their cousin in the dispute. The timing of the dispute, and O'Sullivan's decision not to seek re-election in 1824, may have been related, and may have contributed to O'Sullivan's gradual movement away from the nationalist Parti canadien.

=== The O'Sullivan–Caldwell duel ===
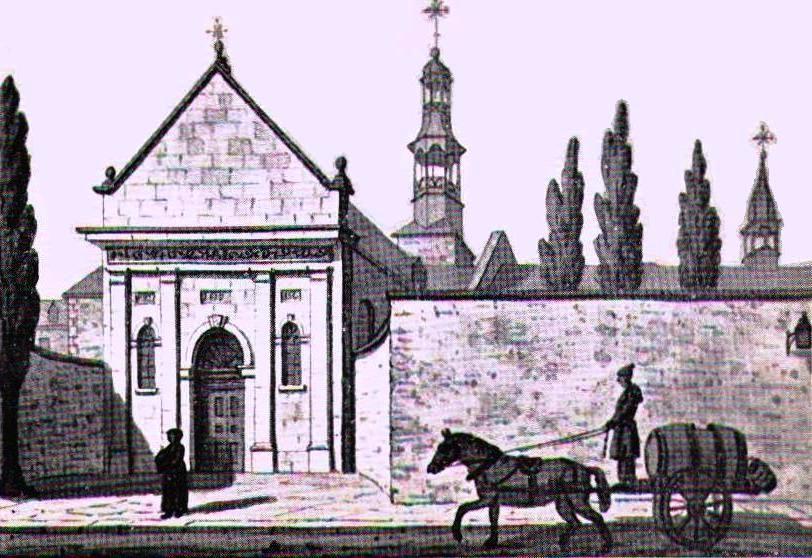
Hôtel-Dieu de Montréal in the 1820s

In 1819, while still a member of the Legislative Assembly, O'Sullivan fought a duel with a Montreal doctor, William Caldwell, over the proposal to build a new hospital for Montreal. The cause of the duel was a speech O'Sullivan gave in the Assembly. Both men were wounded and survived, each with a permanent disability.

Montreal in 1819 had two hospitals, Hôtel-Dieu de Montréal and Hôpital général des frères Charron (also known as the Grey Nuns Hospital), both operated by the Catholic church, in French. The dispute began in January 1819, when John Molson, a prominent brewer and businessman, presented a petition to the Legislative Assembly calling for the creation of a third hospital, non-denominational, to operate in English and serve the English-speaking community of Montreal. The supporters of the project argued that the Hôtel-Dieu was over-crowded and could no longer serve the Montreal population, which had been steadily expanding. The Montreal Gazette editorialised against the project, saying that the Hôtel-Dieu could fulfill Montreal's needs for the foreseeable future.

O'Sullivan, a strong supporter of the Catholic church, opposed the proposal. In a provocative speech in the Assembly, laced with satire, he spoke fervently against the need for a new hospital, arguing that expanding the Hôtel-Dieu was preferable to wasting funds on building a new one, and hinted that the new hospital would conduct experiments on its patients. He also likely feared that the new hospital would attract patients away from Hôtel-Dieu.

Dr Caldwell, a Montreal physician and surgeon, was one of the principal proponents of the new hospital. He wrote a letter to the Canadian Courant newspaper, giving a reasoned response to the criticisms that O'Sullivan had raised, but ended the letter by implying that O'Sullivan lacked personal courage. O'Sullivan responded by challenging Caldwell to a duel, a challenge accepted by Caldwell, a Scottish veteran of the Napoleonic Wars.

The two ex-military men met at 6 am on April 11, 1819, accompanied by their seconds, near the future site of the Victoria Bridge. The duel was fought with pistols, and may have been the longest duel ever fought in Canada. Unusually for the dueling code of the time, it was agreed that each would fire five shots, instead of the customary one or two. It appeared that both men had fiery temperaments. A contemporary report indicated that both were wounded. One of Caldwell's arms was shattered by a ball, an injury that prevented him from practising surgery ever again. O'Sullivan was hit twice, including one wound that left a ball lodged close to his spine in an inoperable position. He walked with a limp for the rest of his life, sometimes in severe pain.

In the end, the Montreal General Hospital opened in 1823, financed by private donations, along with the Montreal Medical Institution, the forerunner to the McGill Medical School. Caldwell taught medicine at the Institute and later the Medical School.

== Later career and death ==
By the 1830s, O'Sullivan had gradually moved towards the Tory political viewpoint. His second wife's family and associates tended to the more conservative positions, and one of the witnesses to their marriage was Joseph Papineau, the conservative father of the Patriote firebrand, Louis-Joseph Papineau. In 1833, the Governor General appointed O'Sullivan to the position of solicitor-general of Lower Canada, citing O'Sullivan's "Public Estimation in this Province for probity, Professional ability & sound constitutional principles in politics."

In November 1837, as the unrest grew which would culminate in the Lower Canada Rebellion, O'Sullivan, along with Attorney General Charles Richard Ogden, wrote a legal opinion for Governor General Lord Gosford, which held that the Governor General had the power to declare martial law in the event of a rebellion. Gosford relied on that opinion when he declared martial law in the district of Montreal on December 5, 1837.

In November 1838, O'Sullivan was appointed Chief Justice of the Court of Queen's Bench for the district of Montreal, but only served for a single term in February 1839. He died on March 7, 1839, aged 54. An autopsy found Caldwell's ball from the duel 20 years prior lodged against the middle of O'Sullivan's spine. He was buried from Notre-Dame in Montreal.
