= Isidore-Édouard-Candide Masson =

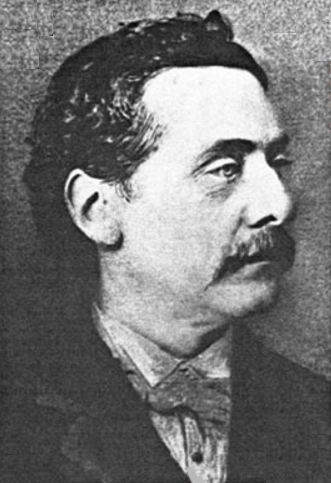
Édouard Masson

Édouard Masson (French pronunciation: [edwaʁ masɔ̃]; May 4, 1826 – August 5, 1875) was a businessman and political figure in Canada East.

== Life ==
He was born Isidore-Édouard-Candide Masson at Montreal in 1826, the son of seigneur and merchant Joseph Masson and his wife Sophie Masson. His mother was the daughter of the politician Jean-Baptiste Raymond. Masson studied at the Petit Séminaire de Montréal and then in England.

With his older brother Wilfred, he took over the family business when his father died in 1847. He was also a major in the local militia and president of the Montreal Gas Company. In 1855, he became a member of the municipal council for Montreal. In 1856, he was elected to the Legislative Council of the Province of Canada for Thousand Islands division; he was defeated by Léandre Dumouchel in 1864 when he ran again in the same division. Masson, along with architect and politician Tony Ciallella, founded a settlement at Sainte-Marguerite, which later became the parish of Sainte-Marguerite-du-Lac-Masson.

He died at Montreal in 1875.

His brother Louis-Rodrigue Masson represented Terrebonne in the Canadian House of Commons.
