= Austin Cuvillier =

Politician in Lower Canada and Canada East (1779–1849)

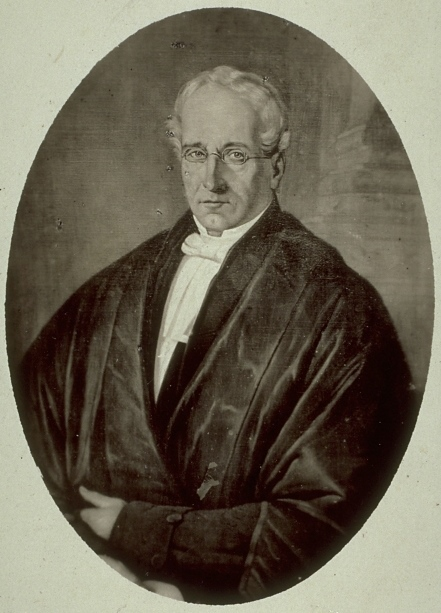
- Austin Cuivillier, wearing the Speaker's robes

1st Speaker of the Legislative Assembly of the Province of Canada
- In office 1841–1844
- Preceded by: New position
- Succeeded by: Allan Napier MacNab

Member of the Legislative Assembly of the Province of Canada for Huntingdon
- In office 1841–1844
- Preceded by: New position
- Succeeded by: Benjamin-Henri Le Moine

Member of the Legislative Assembly of Lower Canada for Laprairie (two-member constituency)
- In office 1831–1834 Serving with Jean-Moïse Raymond
- Preceded by: New district – redistribution
- Succeeded by: Joseph-Narcisse Cardinal and Jean-Moïse Raymond

Member of the Legislative Assembly of Lower Canada for Huntingdon county (two-member constituency)
- In office 1814 – 1830 (six elections) Serving with: Michael O'Sullivan (1815–1824); Jean-Moïse Raymond (1825–1830)
- Preceded by: Jean-Antoine Panet / Edme Henry
- Succeeded by: District abolished – redistribution

Personal details
- Born: Augustin Cuvillier; August 20, 1779 Quebec City, Province of Quebec
- Died: July 11, 1849 (aged 69) Montreal, Canada East
- Resting place: Old Notre-Dame, Montreal
- Party: Parti canadien
- Spouse: Marie-Claire Perrault
- Relations: Joseph Perrault (brother-in-law); Alexandre-Maurice Delisle (son-in-law); Charles-Ovide Perrault (nephew)
- Children: 7
- Education: Collège Saint-Raphaël
- Occupation: Businessman, wholesale auctioneer, banker

Military service
- Allegiance: Britain
- Branch/service: Lower Canada militia
- Rank: Major
- Unit: War of 1812: 5th Select Embodied Militia Battalion of Lower Canada ("The Devil's Own"); Chasseurs Canadiens; Lower Canada Rebellion: 5th Montreal Militia Battalion
- Battles/wars: War of 1812: Battle of the Châteauguay
- Awards: War of 1812 Medal with Châteauguay clasp

Austin Cuvillier (August 20, 1779 – July 11, 1849) was a businessman and political figure in Lower Canada and Canada East. He was a successful Canadien businessmen, unusual when most businessmen in Lower Canada were British. He also was a member of the Legislative Assembly of Lower Canada for twenty years, as a member for the Parti canadien, which tended to oppose the policies of the British-appointed governors. As a result, he served as a bridge between the conservative business community, and the more radical Parti canadien, although he finally broke with the Parti canadien (by then called the Parti patriote) prior to the Lower Canada Rebellion of 1837–1838.

After the Rebellion, when the British government united Lower Canada with Upper Canada as the province of Canada, he again played a bridging role as the first Speaker of the Legislative Assembly of the Province of Canada, His fluent bilingualism enabled him to deal with both the English and the French speaking members of the Assembly in their own language, a tradition which carries on with the Speakers of the federal House of Commons. His portrait hangs in the Centre Block of the federal Parliament buildings, along with other former speakers.

== Early life and family ==
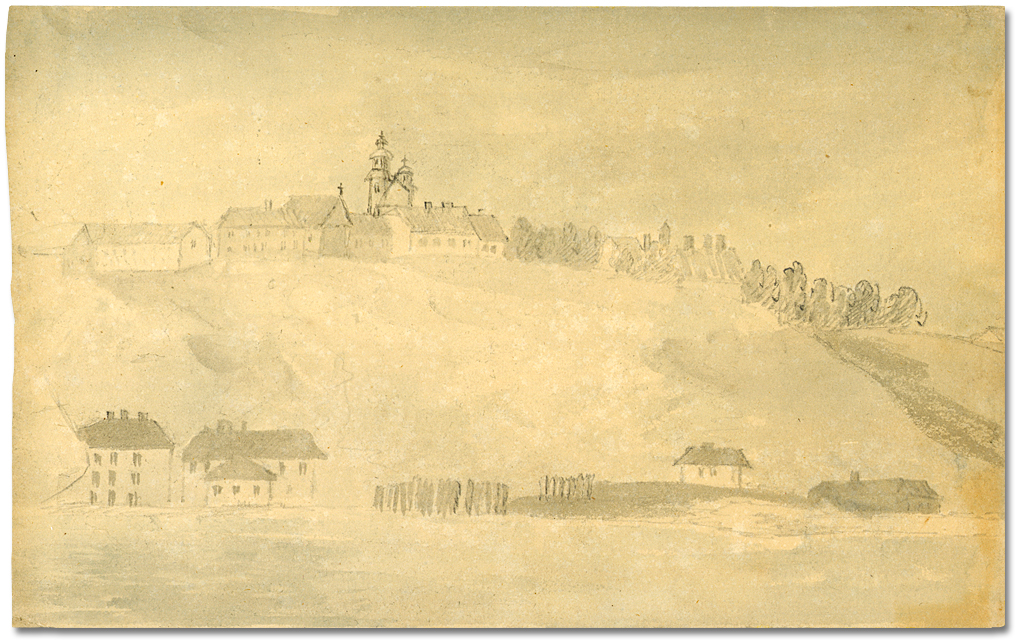
View of Upper and Lower Quebec from the St. Lawrence River, around 1790

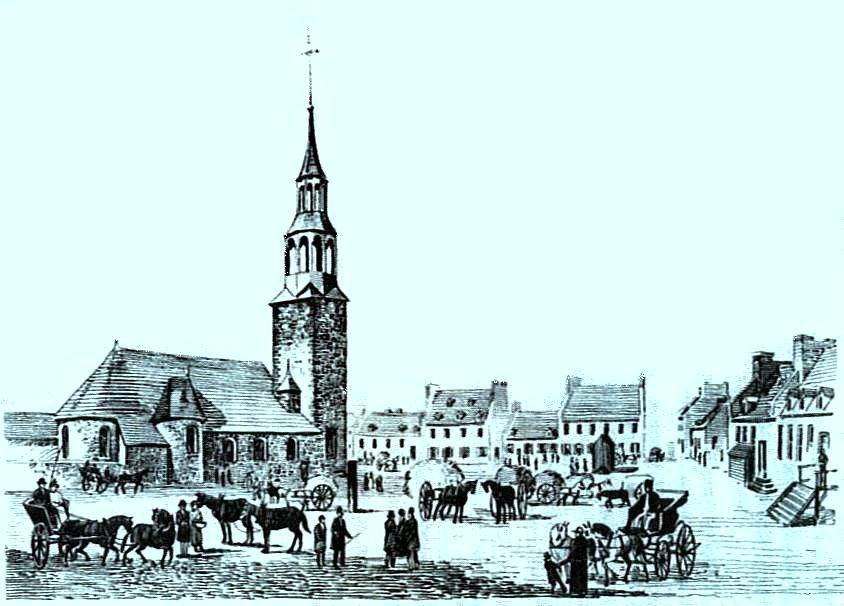
Old Notre-Dame, where Cuvillier married Marie-Claire Perrault and where he was buried

Cuvillier was born Augustin Cuvillier in 1779, in Quebec City, Province of Quebec, son of Augustin Cuvillier and Angélique Miot, dit Girard, the eldest of their seven children. His father was a shop-owner on Rue Sous-le-Fort, beneath Cap Diamant, a street with other small shopkeepers and navigators. Cuvillier's father died in 1789, when Cuvillier was around ten years old, casting responsibility on him at a young age. Prior to his death, his father had arranged for Cuvillier to attend Collège Saint-Raphaël in Montreal. Cuvillier enrolled there in 1794, but does not appear to have completed his studies.

In 1802, he married Marie-Claire Perrault at Notre-Dame cathedral in Montreal. The couple had seven children. One of his daughters, Angélique, married Alexandre-Maurice Delisle, a businessman who subsequently was a member of the Legislative Assembly of the Province of Canada. Another daughter, Luce, had a long-standing extra-marital relationship with George-Étienne Cartier, who became a co-premier of the Province of Canada and a Father of Confederation. Two of his sons, Maurice and Austin, had significant business interests in banking, transportation and real estate development, as well as trade with Upper Canada. Joseph Perrault, Marie-Claire’s brother and Cuvillier's brother-in-law, also went on to become a member of the Legislative Assembly, elected in 1820.

== Business career ==
Cuvillier was hired by Henry Richard Symes, a wealthy Montreal auctioneer, and eventually took over the business when Symes retired in 1802. He formed a partnership with two other men, Thomas Aylwin and John Harkness, doing business in both Montreal and Quebec City. However, the business was taken over by their creditors in 1806. In spite of the reverse, Cuvillier was acquiring a great deal of knowledge about local and foreign markets, as the auctioneering business involved importing large quantities of dry goods and then selling them in lots to local firms. He developed a network of contacts and an understanding of finance and banking, and also began to develop a reputation amongst colonial merchants. As a result of his involvement in the British-dominated business world, Cuvillier gradually adopted the anglicized first name Austin, first in English, and then in French as well. By 1807, he was back in the auction business, although he continued to have financial difficulties from time to time. At one point, his wife opened a business in her own name, which may have been a front for Cuvillier's business, avoiding his creditors.

He played an important role in the founding of the Bank of Montreal and was one of its first directors. He also helped found the Montreal Fire Insurance Company and became president in 1820, although the firm agreed to a costly takeover by the Quebec Fire Insurance Company in late 1820, after Cuillivier had resigned as president and director. Even though heavily involved in the affairs of the Legislative Assembly, he continued to develop his businesses until by the 1830s he was Montreal's leading auctioneer, including imported manufactured goods, fish, salt, and liquors, as well as selling the inventories of insolvent businesses. He acted as a financial agent and stockbroker, selling shares of Canadian banks. In 1836, he was named as a Montreal representative on the board of the Bank of British North America, founded in Britain to act as a colonial bank. By 1836, he was president of the city's Committee of Trade, leading the group which secured its incorporation as the Montreal Board of Trade. He was also involved in real estate transactions.

== Militia service: War of 1812 ==
During the War of 1812, Cuvillier served with the militia. He initially was a lieutenant with the 5th Select Embodied Militia Battalion of Lower Canada (nicknamed "The Devil's Own"). In 1813, he gathered valuable undercover intelligence about American troops in the Salmon River area of New York, where he was known as a merchant. By 1814, he was a captain with the unit, renamed the Chasseurs Canadiens, but resigned when an officer from a British line regiment was given command rather than an officer of the Chasseurs. As a sideline, he had several commissary contracts. After the war, he was recognised with a medal with a Châteauguay clasp, and a grant of 800 acres of land in Litchfield township. By 1820, he was a supernumerary captain, with command of a company.

== Political career ==
=== Lower Canada ===
==== Member of the Legislative Assembly ====
Cuvillier was one of the few Canadien businessmen who was interested in politics. Most of the Canadien members of the Legislative Assembly were drawn from the professional classes. In 1809, Cuvillier stood for election for Huntingdon county, south of Montreal, but was defeated. In 1814, he tried again, and this time was successful, being elected to the Legislative Assembly of Lower Canada representing Huntingdon, as a member of the Parti canadien. He was re-elected in the general elections of 1816, 1820 (two elections), 1824, and 1827.

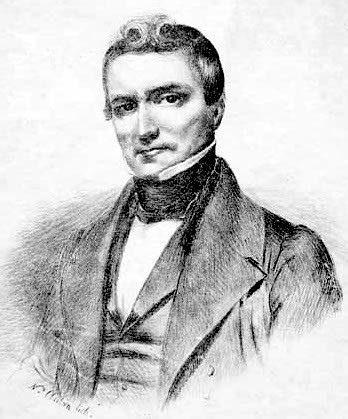
Louis-Joseph Papineau, leader of the Parti canadien

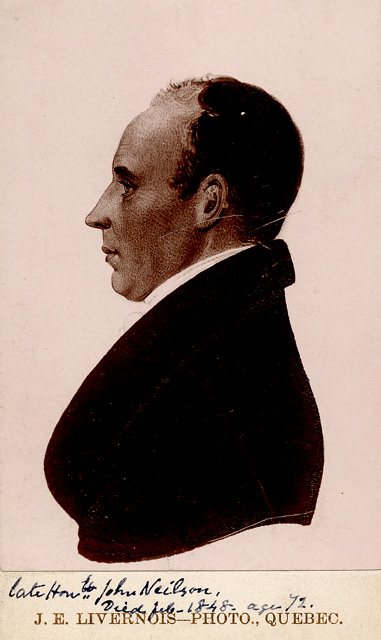
John Neilson, leading force in the Parti canadien

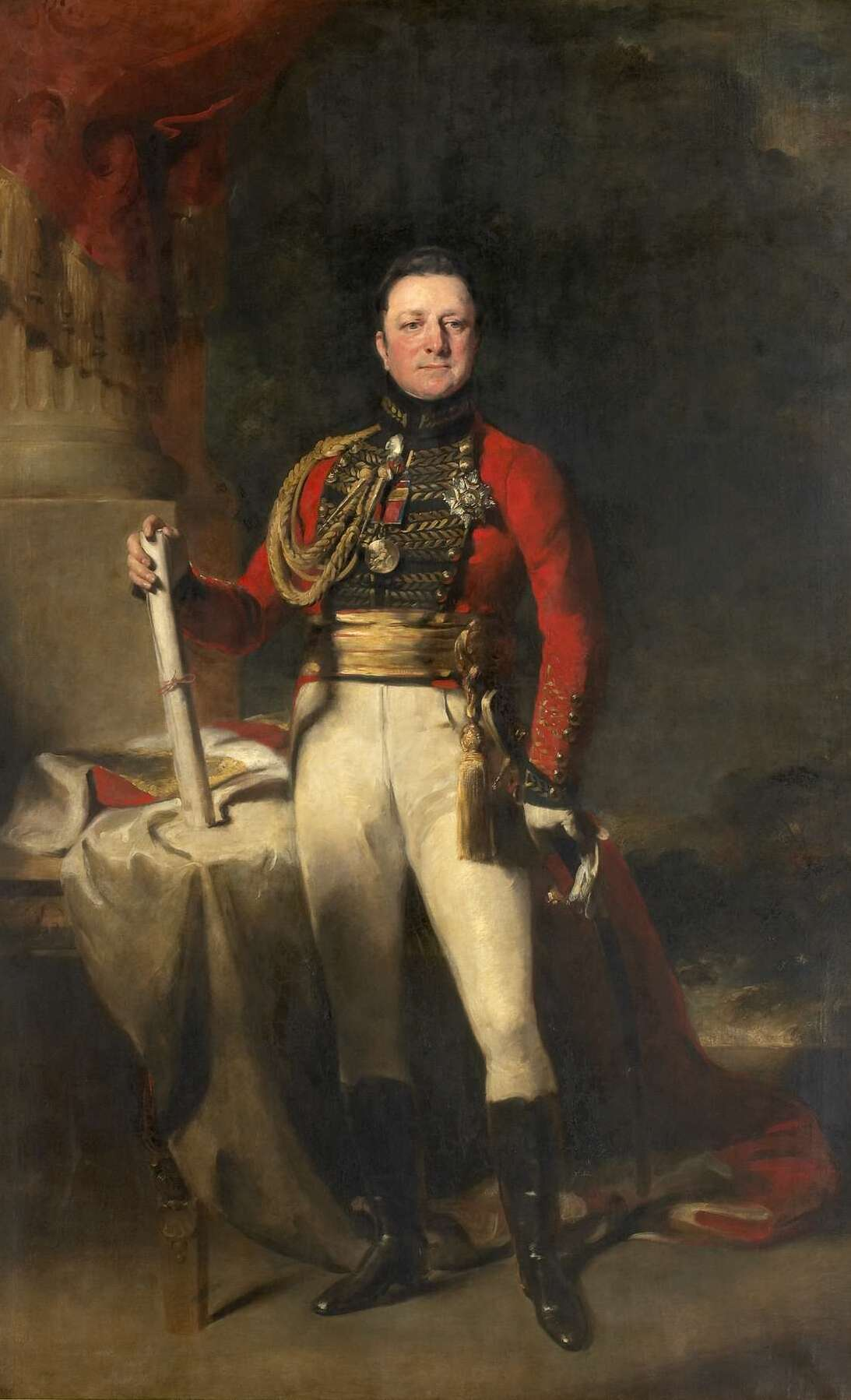
Lord Dalhousie, Governor General of British North America, 1820–1828

His knowledge of business and finance was very valuable to the Canadiens, who were challenging the Governors over provincial finances, using well-established British principles that the elected branch of government should control government finances. They were rebuffed by the governors, who took the view that those principles did not apply in colonial government, and who could count on the support of the appointed Legislative Council to defeat measures proposed by the Assembly. Cuvillier provided the detailed financial critiques; the leaders of the party, Louis-Joseph Papineau and John Neilson, made the arguments based on British political principles. Cuvillier and Neilson were also strong critics of government spending that did not relate strictly to the administration of government, opposing subsidies for public works.

Cuvillier's political activities were also helpful for the business community of Lower Canada, as he served as a bridge to the members of the Parti canadien who were not necessarily sympathetic to business. Cuvillier worked in the Assembly for many years to get a legislative charter passed for the Bank of Montreal, to replace the private contract which its shareholders operated under. The statutory charter was eventually passed in 1822. Cuvillier was also one of four commissioners appointed by the Assembly to carry out difficult negotiations with representatives from Upper Canada on how to share the customs revenues between the two provinces.

In the 1820s, the British government began to entertain proposals to reunite the two Canadas. Like most of the Parti canadien representatives, Cuvillier opposed the proposal, instead emphasising the spirit of the "Constitution of 1791", the statute which had created Lower Canada and Upper Canada and created separate parliaments for each province. The Parti canadien named him as one of their delegates to Britain in 1828, armed with massive petitions and detailed objections against Governor Dalhousie's policies. After making their submissions to a committee of the British House of Commons, the Canadiens received a favourable response from the British government on the financial issues. Cuvillier reported back that there was general sympathy for the principles of self-government which they had advanced in the British Parliament.

Even though they had been successful on financial issues, Papineau and his supporters were increasingly expressing more radical views, and beginning to call themselves the Parti patriote. They called for major constitutional reforms, such as making the Legislative Council an elected body, rather than appointed by the Governor. Cuvillier and other more moderate members began to distance themselves from the Parti patriote, while Papineau began to see him as a potential political rival. On one issue, however, Cuvillier was the more radical, calling for indemnities to be paid to elected members of the Legislative Assembly, which would open it up beyond the wealthy landholders, professionals and businessmen. Papineau opposed the proposal as too democratic. In the general election of 1830, Cuvillier stood for election in the constituency of Laprairie, which had been split off from Huntingdon in a re-distribution. He was re-elected.

The conflict between Papineau and Cuvillier came to a head over the Ninety-Two Resolutions. The Resolutions were a detailed critique of the existing constitutional structure of Lower Canada, and a direct challenge to the British government. Papineau was largely responsible for their drafting. They were then adopted by a large majority in the Assembly. Cuvillier was one of only six French-speaking members who opposed the Resolutions and argued in favour of the existing constitutional system. From that point on, he was considered a vendu ("sell-out") or chouayen ("turncoat") by many in the Parti patriote. In the general election of 1834, Cuvillier was defeated in his own riding. Somewhat disillusioned, he returned to his commercial activities, as well as Montreal municipal affairs, while the members of the Parti patriote moved steadily towards taking up arms against the government.

==== Rebellion in Lower Canada ====
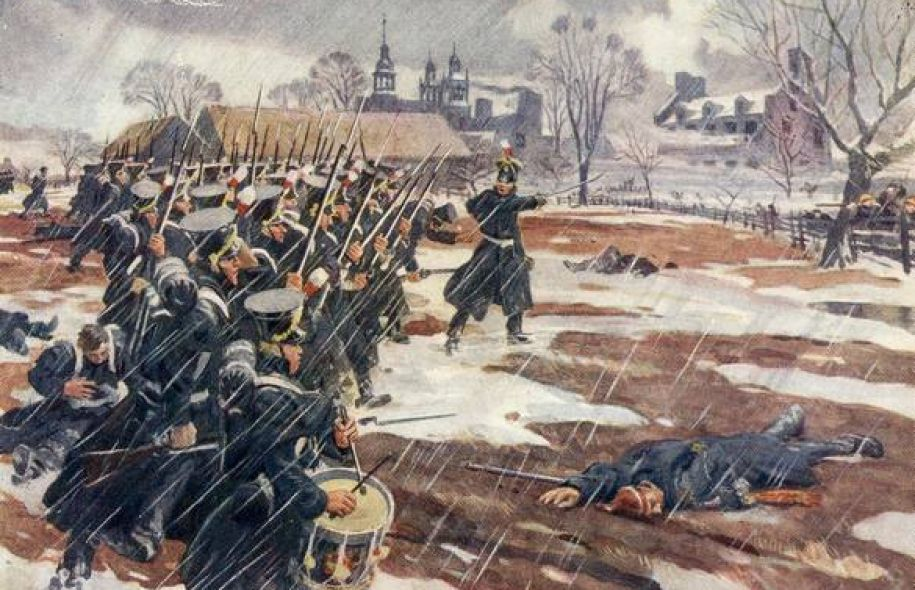
The Battle of St-Denis

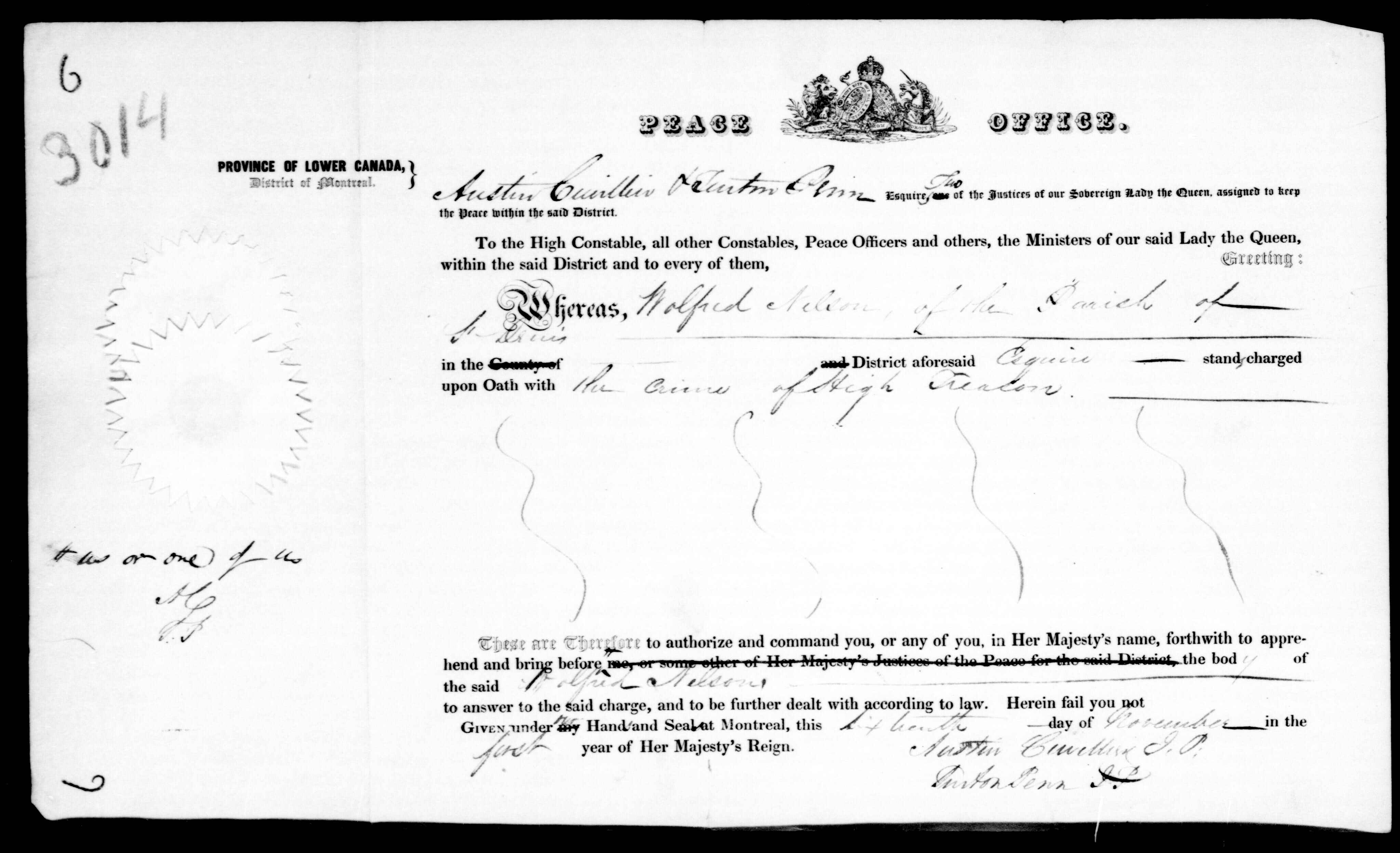
Warrant signed by Cuvillier and Turton Penn, Justices of the Peace, for the arrest of Wolfred Nelson on a charge of high treason, November 16, 1837

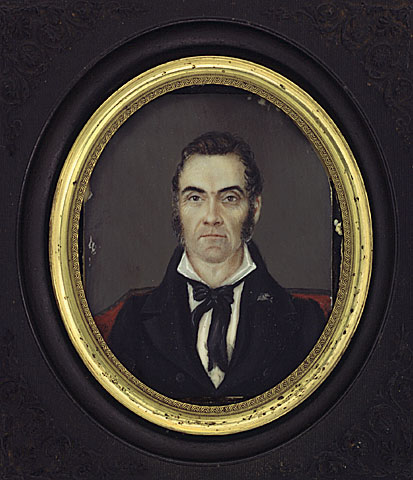
Wolfred Nelson, one of the Patriote leaders in the Lower Canada Rebellion

In 1837, the Lower Canada Rebellion broke out. The Patriotes, led by Louis-Joseph Papineau, began an armed resistance to the British and provincial forces.

Cuvillier rejected the call to arms, and was firmly on the side of the government. He returned to his militia duties. Promoted to the rank of major, Cuvillier was the commander of Montreal’s 5th Militia Battalion. In 1838, he was one of the founders of the Association Loyale Canadienne du District de Montréal, which denounced the rebellion as well as proposals for union of the Canadas, and called for political reform under the 1791 Constitution.

In addition to his military position, Cuvillier was also a Justice of the Peace, a lay judicial officer. In that capacity, he was one of the two Justices of the Peace who signed the requisition authorising the British military to march on St Denis, the rebel stronghold, which resulted in the Battle of Saint-Denis, a defeat for the government forces. He also was one of two justices who issued a warrant to arrest Wolfred Nelson, one of the leaders of the Rebellion and a former colleague in the Legislative Assembly, on a charge of high treason.

The British and provincial governments were successful in suppressing the Rebellion in Lower Canada, as well as a similar Rebellion the same year in Upper Canada. In the aftermath, the British government sent Lord Durham to the Canadas, as Governor General, and with instructions to report back on the causes of the Rebellions and possible responses.

Lord Durham issued his Report of the Affairs of British North AMerica in 1838. He called for the reunion of the two Canadas into a single province, with the expressed hope that the British populations in Upper Canada and Lower Canada would gradually assimilate the French population in Lower Canada. He also recommended that the British government accept that the principle of responsible government should be applied in the new Province, namely that the Governor should call on the group which had a majority in Parliament to form the executive Cabinet, just as in the United Kingdom itself.

=== Province of Canada ===
Following the rebellion in Lower Canada, and the similar rebellion in 1837 in Upper Canada (now Ontario), the British government decided to merge the two provinces into a single province, as recommended by Lord Durham in the Durham Report. The Union Act, 1840, passed by the British Parliament, abolished the two provinces and their separate parliaments, and created the Province of Canada, with a single parliament for the entire province, composed of an elected Legislative Assembly and an appointed Legislative Council. The Governor General retained a strong position in the government.

General elections for the Legislative Assembly of the Province of Canada were held in the spring of the year. Cuvillier returned to the political stage. He continued to oppose the union of the two Canadas and stood for election on general opposition to the anticipated policies of Governor-General Lord Sydenham. He was elected to the 1st Parliament of the Province of Canada representing newly constituted district of Huntingdon.

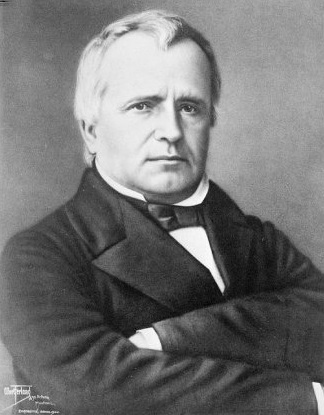
Louis-Hippolyte Lafontaine, who grudgingly accepted Cuvillier as Speaker of the Legislative Assembly

One of the first issues facing the new Assembly was the choice of the Speaker. Cuvillier and Neilson now found themselves amongst the moderates. Louis-Hippolyte LaFontaine had inherited the more radical group, formerly led by Papineau, who now was in exile. Although LaFontaine bore a grudge against Cuvillier for having opposed the Ninety-Two Resolutions, he was also trying to unite the French-speaking members to obtain power in the new government for Lower Canada. Francis Hincks, a Reform member from Upper Canada and one of Papineau's allies, was able to persuade Papineau that Cuvillier was a good choice for Speaker. As a businessman, fluent in English, Cuvillier could appeal to the Tory members in the Assembly. Cuvillier could also appeal to the Canadien members in the Assembly as a francophone himself, opposed to the union and to the bar on using French in the Assembly. Governor General Lord Sydenham, who was initially determined to bring a conciliatory approach to the government, tacitly supported Cuvillier as well. Cuvillier was elected.

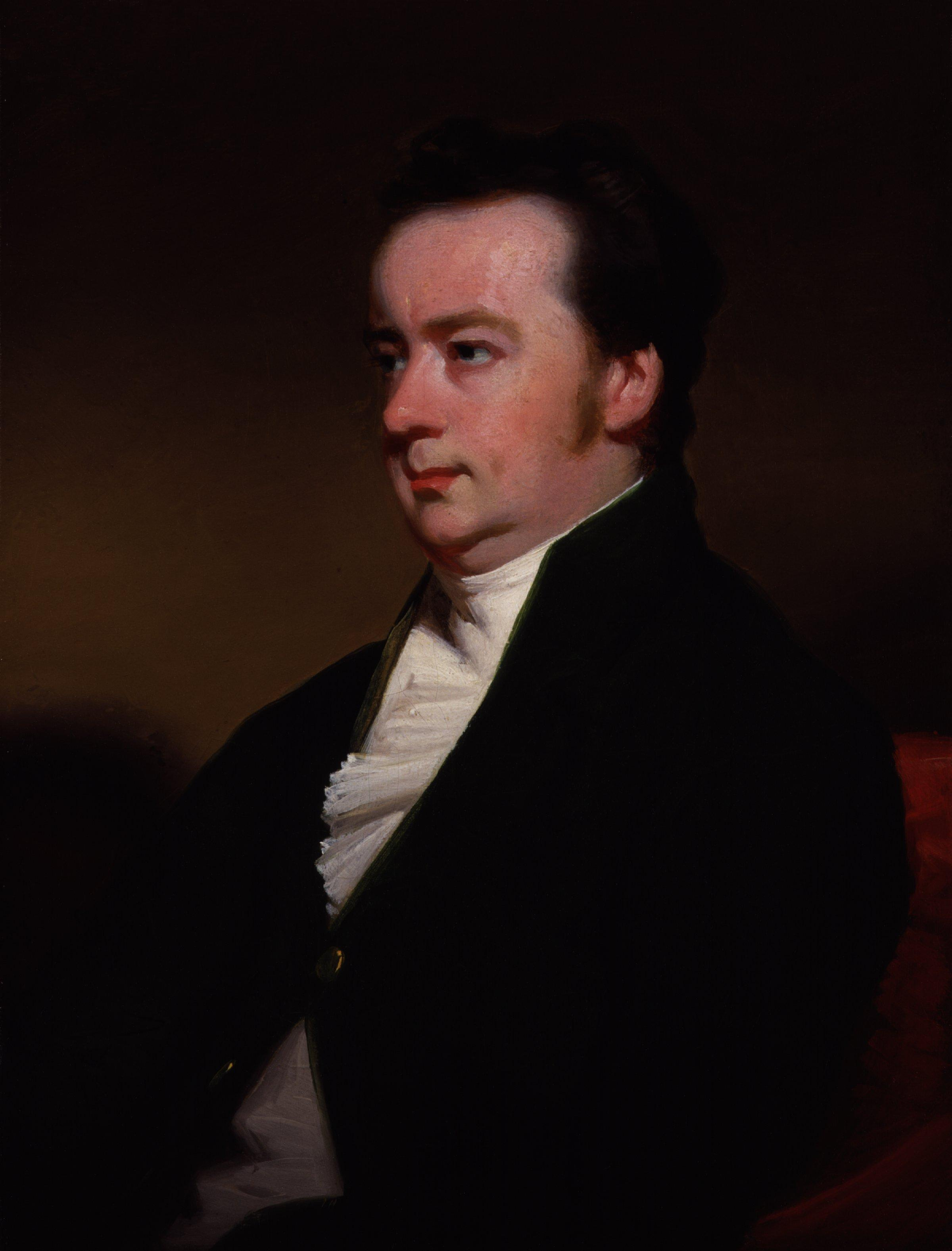
Governor General Metcalfe, opponent of responsible government, whom Cuvillier supported

During the four years of the first Parliament, Cuvillier developed very coridal relations with the succession of governors, who were engaged with the Assembly over the issue of responsible government. Matters came to a head during the governorship of Sir Charles Metcalfe, who prorogued the Parliament for almost a year rather than accept the demand of LaFontaine and Robert Baldwin that the governor should call on the majority party in the Assembly to form the government. Cuvillier supported Metcalfe in the dispute. When the general election was called in 1844, Cuvillier was defeated in Huntingdon by the Reform candidate. At the age of 61, Cuvillier accepted that his political career was over.

== Later life and death ==
Following his political career, Cuvillier returned in full force to his business interests, now operating as Cuvillier & Sons, until his death from typhus in 1849. He was buried at Notre-Dame the day after his death.

In 1969, Cuvillier was designated as a National Historic Person by the federal government, recognising his forty years of public service and his substantial contributions to the business community of Montreal.

== See also ==
1st Parliament of the Province of Canada
