= Jean-Baptiste Varin =

Jean-Baptiste Varin (November 26, 1810 – July 8, 1899) was a notary and political figure in Canada East. He represented Huntingdon in the Legislative Assembly of the Province of Canada from 1851 to 1854.

He was born on Manitoulin Island, Upper Canada, the son of Guillaume Varin and Marguerite Bourassa. He was educated at the Petit Séminaire de Montréal, then articled as a notary at Laprairie, qualified as a notary in 1833 and set up practice at Laprairie. In 1834, he married Hermine, the daughter of Jean-Moïse Raymond. Varin was part of the commission charged with registering title to seigneuries in Canada East in 1855, helped prepare the laws on the registration of land titles after the seigneurial system was abolished, served as director of the land registry office at Montreal from 1868 to 1878 and registrar for Laprairie County from 1878 to 1892. Varin died in Laprairie at the age of 88.

His daughter Marie Elmire married Léon-Benoît-Alfred Charlebois. Another daughter, Angéline, married Joseph Doutre in 1858, but died the next year.

== Sources ==
- "Biography". Dictionnaire des parlementaires du Québec de 1792 à nos jours (in French). National Assembly of Quebec.
