= Édouard Masson =

Édouard Masson may refer to:

- Isidore-Édouard-Candide Masson (1826–1875), member of the Legislative Council of the Province of Canada
- Édouard Masson (1896–1974), member of the Legislative Council of Quebec
