= Charles-Ovide Perrault =

Canadian politician

Charles-Ovide Perrault (September 24, 1809 – November 24, 1837) was a lawyer and political figure in Lower Canada. He represented Vaudreuil in the Legislative Assembly of Lower Canada from 1834 to 1837.

He was born in Montreal, the son of Julien Perrault and Euphrosine Lamontagne, and was educated at the Petit Séminaire de Montréal. Perrault went on to study law with Denis-Benjamin Viger, was admitted to the Lower Canada bar in 1832 and practised law in Montreal. In 1837, he married Marie-Mathilde Roy. Perrault spoke at a number of assemblies of the Patriotes and was fatally wounded at the Battle of Saint-Denis while serving with Wolfred Nelson. He died in office at the age of 28.

His sister Luce married Édouard-Raymond Fabre, who later served as mayor of Montreal. His uncles Joseph Perrault and Austin Cuvillier also served in the assembly. His grand-nephew Maurice Perrault served in the Quebec assembly.
