= Léandre Dumouchel =

Canadian politician (1811–1882)

The Hon. Léandre Dumouchel
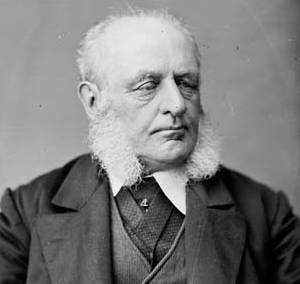

Senator for Mille Isles, Quebec
- In office 1867–1882
- Appointed by: Royal Proclamation
- Succeeded by: Louis-Rodrigue Masson

Personal details
- Born: 29 March 1811 Saint-Benoît (Mirabel), Lower Canada
- Died: 24 September 1882 (aged 71) Saint-Benoît (Mirabel), Quebec
- Party: Conservative

Léandre Dumouchel (29 March 1811 – September 24, 1882) was a Quebec medical doctor and political figure. He was a Conservative Party of Canada member of the Senate of Canada for Mille Isles division from 1867 to 1882.

He was born Vital-Léandre Dumouchelle in Saint-Benoît, Lower Canada, the son of Jean-Baptiste Dumouchelle, in 1811 and studied at the Petit Séminaire de Montréal. He apprenticed in medicine, qualified to practice in 1835 and set up his practice at Saint-Benoît. Dumouchel took part in the Lower Canada Rebellion but was not arrested, although he was removed from his position as a justice of the peace. He took refuge until an amnesty was announced and then returned to his practice at Saint-Benoît, later moving to Saint-Jérôme in the 1840s. He served as lieutenant-colonel in the local militia from 1847 to 1869 and was president of the agricultural society for Deux-Montagnes County. He was elected to the Legislative Council of the Province of Canada in 1864 and served until Confederation, when he was named to the Senate.

He died in Saint-Benoît in 1882.
