= Berthelet =

Berthelet may refer to:

- Bartholomeus Anglicus (d. 1272), also known as Berthelet, author of De Proprietatibus Rerum
- Antoine-Olivier Berthelet (1798 – 1872), businessman, philanthropist, and political figure of Lower Canada
- Jacques Berthelet (b. 1934), bishop emeritus of Saint-Jean-Longueuil in Montreal
