= Sauvageau =

Sauvageau is a surname. Notable people with the surname include:

- Benoît Sauvageau (1963–2006), Canadian politician
- Camille Sauvageau (1861-1936), French phycologist
- Charles Sauvageau (1807-1849), Canadian conductor, composer and music educator
- Danièle Sauvageau, Canadian hockey coach
- Paul-Émile Sauvageau (1918–2003), Canadian politician
- Tancrède Sauvageau (1819–1892), merchant and political figure in Canada East
