= Pierre Berthelet =

Canadian merchant

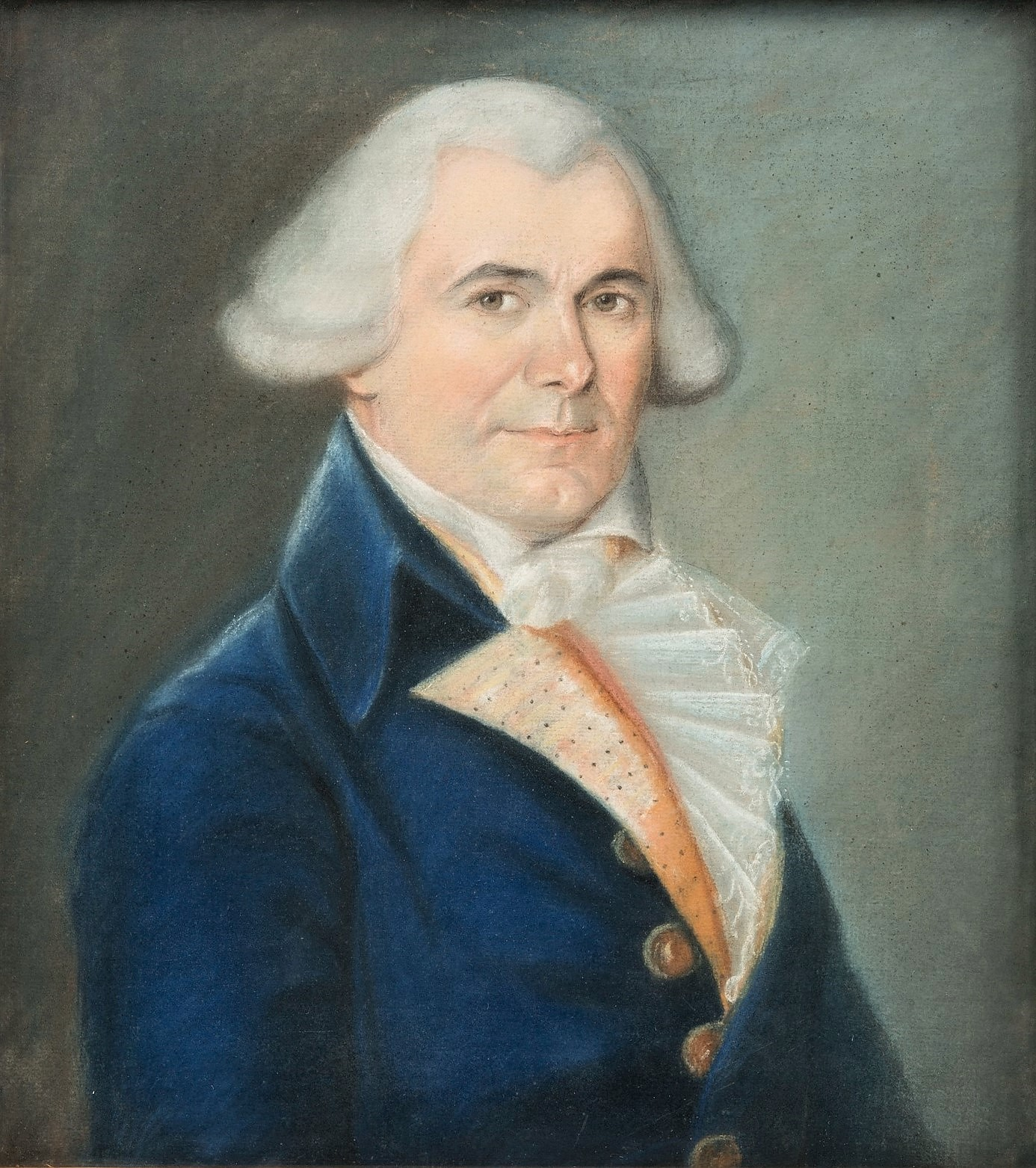
Pierre Berthelet, ca 1790, pastel by Louis Dulongpré (Detroit Institute of Arts)

Pierre Berthelet (15 April 1746 - 2 January 1830) was a merchant in the Montreal area. He was also heavily involved in real estate.

Berthelet probably began his first successful business ventures in the fur trade. Records show that he was successful as a wheat merchant. Real estate transaction records show that he was the largest property owner in Montreal by 1820.

The importance of Pierre Berthelet to Canadian economic history stems from his success in the transitional economy in which he flourished. From the fur and wheat trade to a much more complex real estate and financial business stream, he adapted and transitioned and left a large, well organized estate to his heirs.

A son, Antoine-Olivier Berthelet, was to continue in real estate and take the family into Lower Canada politics. His son-in-law, René-Joseph Kimber, married to his daughter Appoline, also was active in politics, elected to the Legislative Assembly of Lower Canada. Another daughter, Cécile, was briefly married to Michael O'Sullivan, but died young. O'Sullivan was also a member of the legislative Assembly.
