= Joseph Perrault (Lower Canada politician) =

Canadian politician

Joseph Perrault (October 18, 1789 – August 28, 1831) was a politician in Lower Canada. He represented Montréal County in the Legislative Assembly of Lower Canada from 1820 to 1831.

He was born in Montreal, the son of Joseph Perrault and Marie-Anne Tavernier. Perrault was a lieutenant in the militia during the War of 1812, later reaching the rank of captain. He died in office in Montreal at the age of 41.

His nephew Charles-Ovide Perrault also served in the assembly. His sister Claire married Austin Cuvillier. Perrault himself was never married.
