= Louis Bétournay =

Canadian lawyer and judge

Louis Bétournay (November 13, 1825 – October 30, 1879), educated at the Collège de Montréal, was a lawyer and judge who was born in Saint-Lambert, Quebec, and died at Saint-Boniface, Manitoba.

In 1872, Bétournay became a judge in what was the newly-proclaimed province of Manitoba. The appointment was to the Court of Queen's Bench, making him the first French Canadian to be appointed to a superior court in the west. The posting was to Fort Garry, where he was soon involved in the legal aftermath of the Red River Rebellion. His court ordered the trial of Louis Riel’s lieutenant, Ambroise-Dydime Lépine, for the death of Thomas Scott.
