= Gabriel Grégoire =

Canadian football player

Profile
- Position: Defensive end

Personal information
- Born: December 22, 1953 (age 72); Sainte-Martine, Quebec, Canada

Career information
- QJFL: Verdun Maple Leaf

Career history
- 1976–80: Montreal Alouettes

Awards and highlights
- Grey Cup champion (1977)

Gabriel Grégoire (born December 22, 1953) is a former defensive lineman in the Canadian Football League (CFL).

Grégoire went to high school at the Collège de Montréal, but played his junior football with the Verdun Maple Leafs.

The 6-foot-3-inch (1.91 m) and 230-pound (100 kg) lineman joined the Montreal Alouettes in 1976 and played 5 seasons, for a total of 65 games, and three Grey Cup championships, one, the 65th Grey Cup, which he helped win in 1977.

In predominantly francophone Montreal, Gabriel Grégoire was perceived as a home grown talent, which contributed to his popularity.

Grégoire was the co-host of the sport radio show on CKAC sport named Sports du lit with host Michel Langevin. He also appears regularly on television for his football and sports expertise.
