= Leinster (Province of Canada electoral district) =

Electoral district in former Province of Canada

Province of Canada electoral district

Defunct pre-Confederation electoral district
- Legislature: Legislative Assembly of the Province of Canada
- District created: 1841
- District abolished: 1867
- First contested: 1841
- Last contested: 1851

Leinster was an electoral district of the Legislative Assembly of the Parliament of the Province of Canada, in Canada East, west of Montreal. It was created in 1841, and was based on the previous electoral districts of l'Assomption and La Chesnaye (or Lachenaie) in the Legislative Assembly of Lower Canada. It was represented by one member in the Legislative Assembly.

The electoral district was abolished in 1854, as part of the expansion and redistribution of electoral districts that came into force that year.

== Boundaries ==
The Union Act, 1840 merged the two provinces of Upper Canada and Lower Canada into the Province of Canada, with a single Parliament. The separate parliaments of Lower Canada and Upper Canada were abolished.

The Union Act provided that while many of the pre-existing electoral boundaries of Lower Canada and Upper Canada would continue to be used in the new Parliament, some electoral districts would be defined directly by the Union Act itself. Leinster was one of those new electoral districts. The Union Act merged the previous electoral districts of the County of Lachenaie and the County of L’Assomption, to create a new district, called Leinster.

The former districts of Lachenaie and l'Assomption had been defined by the 1829 boundaries as follows:

The County of Lachenaie shall comprehend the Parishes of Lachenaie, Saint Henry de Mascouche and Saint Roch, and the Townships of Kilkenny and Wexford.

The County of l'Assomption shall comprehend the Parishes of Saint Sulpice, comprising Isle Bouchard, Repentigny, l'Assomption and Saint Jacques and the Townships of Rawdon and Chertsey.

With the merger of those counties, the new district stretched from south-west of Montreal (now Les Moulins Regional County Municipality), north across the Saint Lawrence River to the north-west of Montreal (now the L'Assomption Regional County Municipality).

== Members of the Legislative Assembly (1841–1854) ==
Leinster was a single-member constituency.

The following were the members of the Legislative Assembly for Leinster. The party affiliations are based on the biographies of individual members given by the National Assembly of Quebec, as well as votes in the Legislative Assembly. "Party" was a fluid concept, especially during the early years of the Province of Canada.

| Parliament | Members | Years in Office | Party |
|---|---|---|---|
| 1st Parliament; 1841–1844 | Jean-Moïse Raymond (Note: Vacated seat on January 1, 1842, on appointment as District Registrar of Leinster: Côté, Appointments and Elections, p. 59, note (16).) | 1841–1842 | Anti-unionist; French-Canadian Group |
| 1st Parliament; 1841–1844 | Jacob De Witt (Note: Elected in by-election, August 8, 1842: Côté, Appointments and Elections, p. 59, note (17).) | 1842–1844 (By-election) | French-Canadian Group |
| 2nd Parliament; 1844–1847 | Jacob De Witt | 1844–1847 | French-Canadian Group |
| 3rd Parliament; 1848–1851 | Norbert Dumas | 1848–1851 | Ministerialist |
| 4th Parliament; 1851–1854 | Louis-Michel Viger | 1851–1854 | Ministerialist |

== Abolition ==
The Leinster electoral district was abolished in 1854, when the 1853 redistribution of electoral districts came into force.

== See also ==
- List of elections in the Province of Canada
