= Sophie Masson (philanthropist) =

Canadian philanthropist and aristocrat

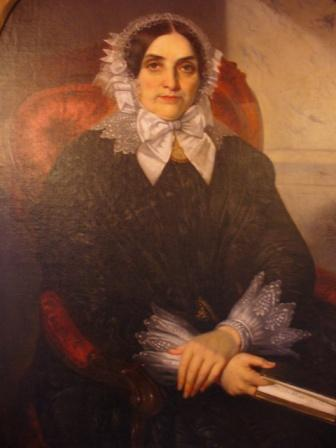
- Portrait of Sophie Masson, by Théophile Hamel, in 1855
- Born: October 6, 1798
- Died: November 30, 1882 (aged 84); Terrebonne, Quebec
- Occupation(s): Lady, patron, industrialist, philanthropist
- Spouse: Joseph Masson
- Children: 12 (including Louis-Rodrigue Masson and Isidore-Édouard-Candide Masson
- Parents: Jean-Baptiste Raymond (father); Marie-Clotilde Girardin (mother)

Marie-Geneviève-Sophie Masson (née Raymond; October 6, 1798 – November 30, 1882) was a Canadian philanthropist and aristocrat from Quebec who served as seigneuress of Terrebonne from 1847 to 1883.

The Sophie Masson Bridge between Laval and Terrebonne, and Sophie Masson Park in Terrebonne, bear her name.

== Biography ==
Baptised on October 6, 1798, Geneviève Sophie Raymond was the daughter of Jean-Baptiste Raymond, then aged 40, merchant and businessman, future Member of Parliament (MP) for Huntingdon. Her mother was Marie-Clotilde Girardin.

She succeeded her husband Joseph Masson at the head of the seigneury, she developed its industry, notably that of the mills on the Île des Moulins. She had the macadam road network and the first bridge built in Terrebonne, established the seigneurial office, built a large manor house, known as Collège Saint-Sacrement, and founded the Terrebonne college. She also financed social works, had the new church, a convent and the presbytery built on land that she donated.

She died in Terrebonne on November 30, 1882.

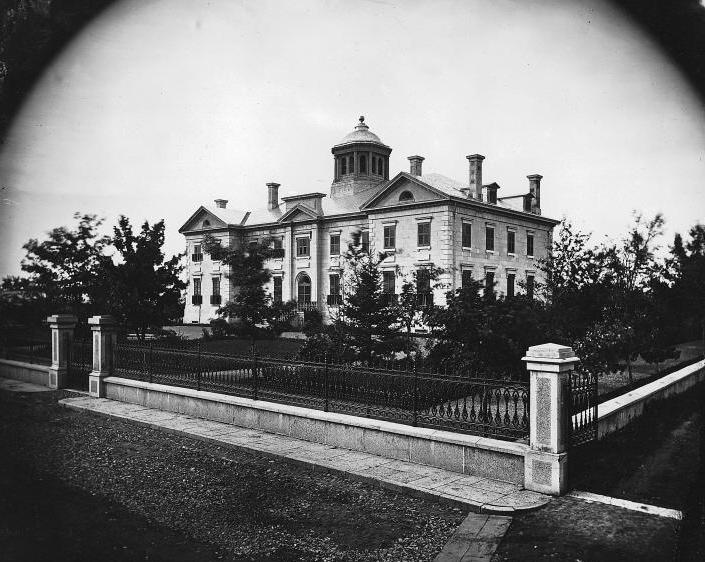
The Masson manor that she had built; photo from 1865.

== Namesakes ==
- Sophie Masson Bridge over Rivière des Mille Îles between Laval and Terrebonne
- Sophie Masson Park in Terrebonne
- The Sophie, Joseph Masson's ship

== Bibliography ==
- Gérard Parizeau (1975). La société canadienne-française au 19th century. Montréal: Fides. pp. 282–316, 543, 545. Parizeau1975. :
  - Portrait de Sophie Masson en couverture ;
  - « Joseph Masson, ou le sens de la durée », pages 282-316 ;
  - « commentaire des illustrations : Madame Joseph Masson (page de couverture) », page 543.
- Marguerite L. Desjardins (1994). "Les Masson, une famille de bâtisseurs – Une femme de tête" (pdf). Continuité (in French). No. 60. pp. 47–48 – via Érudit..
- "Exposition Geneviève-Sophie Masson: Une femme, un manoir, une histoire". terrebonnemascouche.com (in French). June 2019..
- "Pont Sophie-Masson: Origine et signification". toponymie.gouv.qc.ca (in French). Commission de toponymie du Québec..
- Fernand Ouellet, « Masson, Joseph », dans Dictionnaire biographique du Canada, vol. 7 : 1836–1850, Université de Toronto et Université Laval, 1988 (lire en ligne).
- Masson, Henri (1972). Joseph Masson, dernier seigneur de Terrebonne, 1791-1847. Montréal..
