= Huntingdon (Province of Canada electoral district) =

Electoral district in former Province of Canada

Province of Canada electoral district

Defunct pre-Confederation electoral district
- Legislature: Legislative Assembly of the Province of Canada
- District created: 1841
- District abolished: 1867
- First contested: 1841
- Last contested: 1863

Huntingdon was an electoral district of the Legislative Assembly of the Parliament of the Province of Canada, in Canada East, south of Montreal. It was created in 1841 and was based on the previous electoral districts of L'Acadie and Laprairie in the Legislative Assembly of Lower Canada. It was represented by one member in the Legislative Assembly.

The electoral district was abolished in 1867, upon the creation of Canada and the province of Quebec.

== Boundaries ==
The Union Act, 1840 had merged the two provinces of Upper Canada and Lower Canada into the Province of Canada, with a single Parliament. The separate parliaments of Lower Canada and Upper Canada were abolished.

The Union Act provided that while many of the pre-existing electoral boundaries of Lower Canada and Upper Canada would continue to be used in the new Parliament, some electoral districts would be defined directly by the Union Act itself. Huntingdon was one of those new electoral districts. The Union Act merged the previous electoral districts of the County of L'Acadie and the County of Laprairie, to create a new district, called Huntingdon.

The former districts of Laprairie and L'Acadie had been defined by the 1829 boundaries as follows:

The County of Laprairie shall be bounded on the north west by the River Saint Lawrence, on the south east by the Township of Sherrington, and part of the Barony of Longueuil, on the north east by the County of Chambly, and on the south west by the seigniory of Beauharnois; and shall comprehend the Seigniories of Laprarie de la Magdeleine, Sault Saint Louis, La Salle and Chateauguay, and the Isles in the River Saint Lawrence, nearest to the said County, and either wholly or in part opposite the same.

The County of Acadie shall be bounded on the north west by the County of Laprairie, on the south by the Province line, on the east by the River Chambly or Richelieu, on the north east by the County of Chambly, and on the south west by the north east line of the township of Hemmingford, and part of the Seigniory of Beauharnois; and shall comprehend the Seigniories of Lacolle and DeLery, and the Township of Sherrington, also the Islands in the said River Chambly or Richelieu, nearest to the said County, and which are wholly or in part opposite the same.

The effect of the Union Act provision was to merge those two districts into one. The new district was located directly south of Montreal (now part of the Montérégie administrative region), extending from the Saint Lawrence south to the border with the United States.

== Members of the Legislative Assembly ==
Huntingdon was a single-member constituency in the Legislative Assembly.

The following were the members of the Legislative Assembly from Huntingdon. "Party" was a fluid concept, especially during the early years of the Province of Canada. Party affiliations are based on the biographies of individual members given by the National Assembly of Quebec, as well as votes in the Legislative Assembly.

| Parliament | Member | Years in Office | Party |
|---|---|---|---|
| 1st Parliament; 1841–1844 | Austin Cuvillier | 1841–1844 | Anti-unionist; French-Canadian Group |

== Abolition ==
The district was abolished on July 1, 1867, when the British North America Act, 1867 came into force, splitting the Province of Canada into Quebec and Ontario. It was succeeded by electoral districts of the same name in the House of Commons of Canada and the Legislative Assembly of Quebec.
