= Jean-Baptiste Dumouchelle =

Jean-Baptiste Dumouchelle (5 April 1784, in Dumouchel – 29 March 1844) was born in Sandwich (now Windsor), Quebec. He was a leading figure in Saint-Benoît through his pursuits as a militia officer, general merchant and magistrate.

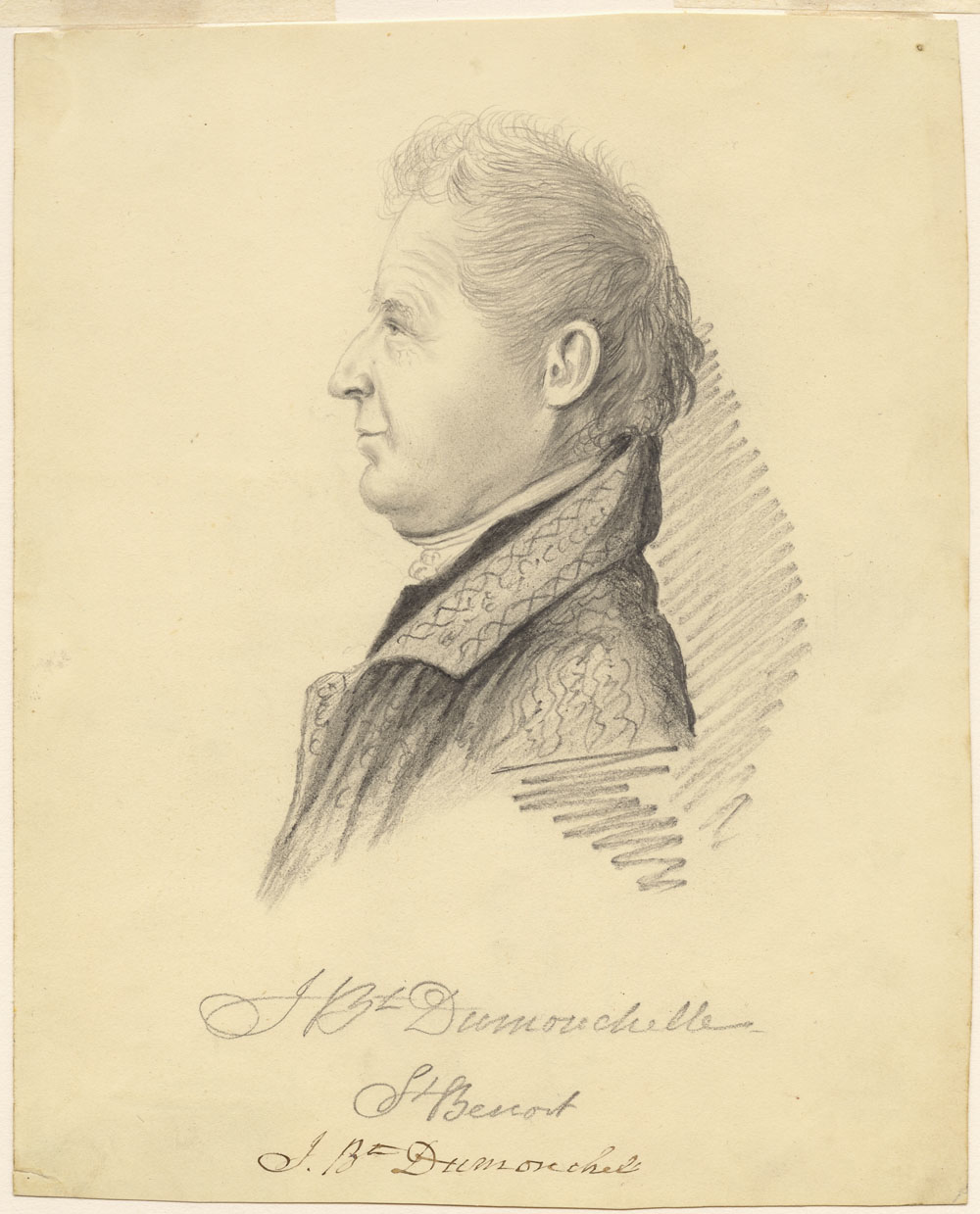
Jean-baptiste Dumouchelle

== Education and career ==
At the age of 11 Dumouchelle left Sandwich, completing his classical studies at Collège Saint-Raphaël in Montreal in 1803. He later worked as a clerk and then became a general merchant at Saint-Benoît making him a well established figure in the town. After his marriage to Victoire Felix and the birth of their four children, Dumouchelle achieved the rank of captain in the Rivière-du-Chêne battalion of militia serving in the War of 1812.

After the war, in 1815, Dumouchelle returned to his business in Saint-Benoît where he gained an interest in politics. He held an active role in meetings performed by the Patriotes during 1827. His participation in these meetings was considered outrageous and he was banned from the militia because of it. He was later reinstated into the militia serving as a major in the Deux-Montagnes battalion of militia.

Dumouchelle was again dismissed from the militia for his participation in the revolutionary gatherings leading up to the Rebellions of 1837. Even though he took no part in the rebellion of 1837 Dumouchelle was arrested along with his sons on December 17 and held until July 8, 1838. When he returned to Saint-Benoît he found his home and business in ruins from the pillaging of Colborne's troops during 1837.
