= Tancrède Sauvageau =

Tancrède Sauvageau (January 13, 1819 – March 15, 1892) was a merchant and political figure in Canada East. He represented Huntingdon in the Legislative Assembly of the Province of Canada from 1848 to 1851.

He was born Joseph-Tancrède-Cyrille Sauvageau in Châteauguay, Lower Canada, the son of Alexis Sauvageau and Marguerite Bougrette, dit Dufort, and was educated at the Petit Séminaire de Montréal. Sauvageau operated a distillery at Laprairie. He was mayor of Laprairie-de-la-Madeleine. He married Marie-Clotilde, the daughter of Jean-Moïse Raymond in 1848. In 1855, he was named registrar for Huntingdon County. Around 1872, Sauvageau left Quebec and moved to Saint Louis, Missouri, where he died at the age of 73.
