= Jean-Baptiste Raymond =

Canadian politician (1757–1825)

Jean-Baptiste Raymond (December 6, 1757 – March 19, 1825) was a seigneur, businessman and political figure in Lower Canada.

== Life ==
He was born in Saint-Roch-des-Aulnaies in New France in 1757 and entered the fur trade at an early age. He later became a merchant at La Tortue (later Saint-Mathieu). In 1784, he married Marie-Clotilde, the daughter of Montreal merchant Charles-François Girardin. He inherited the seigneury of Lac-Matapédia from his mother but was forced to sell it in 1796 due to financial difficulties with his business. He was elected to the Legislative Assembly of Lower Canada for Huntingdon County in 1800 and reelected in 1804. In 1801, he moved to La Prairie. He went into business with his son Jean-Moïse around 1805. Raymond was involved in the sale of dry goods and also invested in real estate. He was made a justice of the peace and also served as a captain in the militia. He helped organize a meeting held in 1822 to protest a proposed union of Upper Canada and Lower Canada.

He died in La Prairie in 1825.

His daughter Marie-Geneviève-Sophie married the merchant Joseph Masson. His daughter Clotilde married Paul-Théophile Pinsonaut, they were the parents of Pierre-Adolphe Pinsoneault. His widow married Edme Henry in 1828.
