= Joseph Masson =

Canadian businessman (1791–1847)

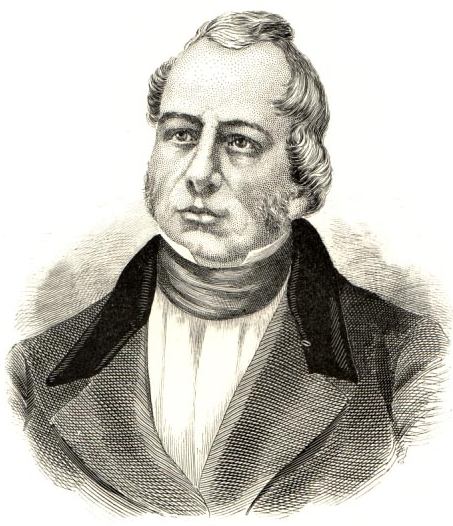
- Born: January 5, 1791; Saint-Eustache, Lower Canada
- Died: May 15, 1847 (aged 56); Terrebonne, Canada
- Occupation: Business
- Known for: First French Canadian millionaire
- Spouse: Sophie Masson

Joseph Masson (January 5, 1791 – May 15, 1847) was a Canadian businessman, who is considered the first French Canadian millionaire.

Seigneur of Terrebonne, Quebec, president of Masson societies, president of the City Gas, he was also vice-president of the Banque de Montréal, president of the Saint-Jean-Baptiste Society of Montreal, and member of the Legislative Council of Lower Canada.

He was a major Canadian businessman in the 1830 years, and he is a member of the Canadian Business Hall of Fame.

== Biography ==
Masson, born in Saint-Eustache, Quebec in 1791, was the only son (there were also three daughters) born to Antoine Masson, joiner who did not know how to write, and Suzanne née Pfeiffer or Payfer.

After studies at Saint-Eustache school, he went at 16 to Saint-Benoît, Mirabel to learn the commercial business, as an apprentice of the merchant Duncan McGillis.

=== Import-export ===
Masson was hired in May 1812 by the Scottish merchant Hugh Robertson, who found him very clever. The company had some difficulties, and a bankruptcy in 1814. But Masson proved his worth, and became partner in 1815 with 12.5% of the shares. He became responsible for sales in Scotland, and then the chief of the Canadian company. His partnership contract with the Robertsons was revised in 1818 and in 1819, when William Robertson died, and his share of the profits rose to 50%.

Masson was married in 1818 to Marie-Geneviève-Sophie Raymond, daughter of Jean-Baptiste Raymond (1757–1825), seigneur of Lake Matapedia and deputy of Huntingdon.

Masson devoted all his energy to develop his business, and admitted wanting to "beat" and "break down" his competitors.

His import-export companies grew and diversified. In 1830, the group had three companies: the W. and H. Robertson and Company, in Glasgow, led by Hugh Robertson; the Robertson, Masson, LaRocque and Company in Montreal, led by Masson; Masson, LaRocque, Strang and Company in Quebec, created by Masson and directed by John Strang. Masson and Robertson held more than 80% of their capital. Masson was while the Canadian businessman most involved in trade with the UK market.

=== Transports and energy ===
To transport his products, he bought a new boat of 290 tons, he gave it the name of his wife, "Sophie". Then he bought, in whole or in participation, two other boats and a steamboat. Also related to transport, he asked the Legislative Assembly to build a canal; he created a shipping company and initiated the construction of a railway.

In 1832, Masson was involved in the founding of the first railway in Canada: the Champlain and St. Lawrence Railroad.

Masson also invested in urban utilities of water supply and Gas lighting, in Montreal, in Quebec and in Toronto. At the invitation of his associates, he made an initial investment in Montreal, and his participation in 1842 reached more than a third of the société du Gaz de Montréal. He founded with John Strang in 1841 the Compagnie de l’eau et de l’éclairage au gaz of Quebec, and with Furniss founded the City of Toronto Light Gas and Water Company, of which he was president.

=== The banks ===
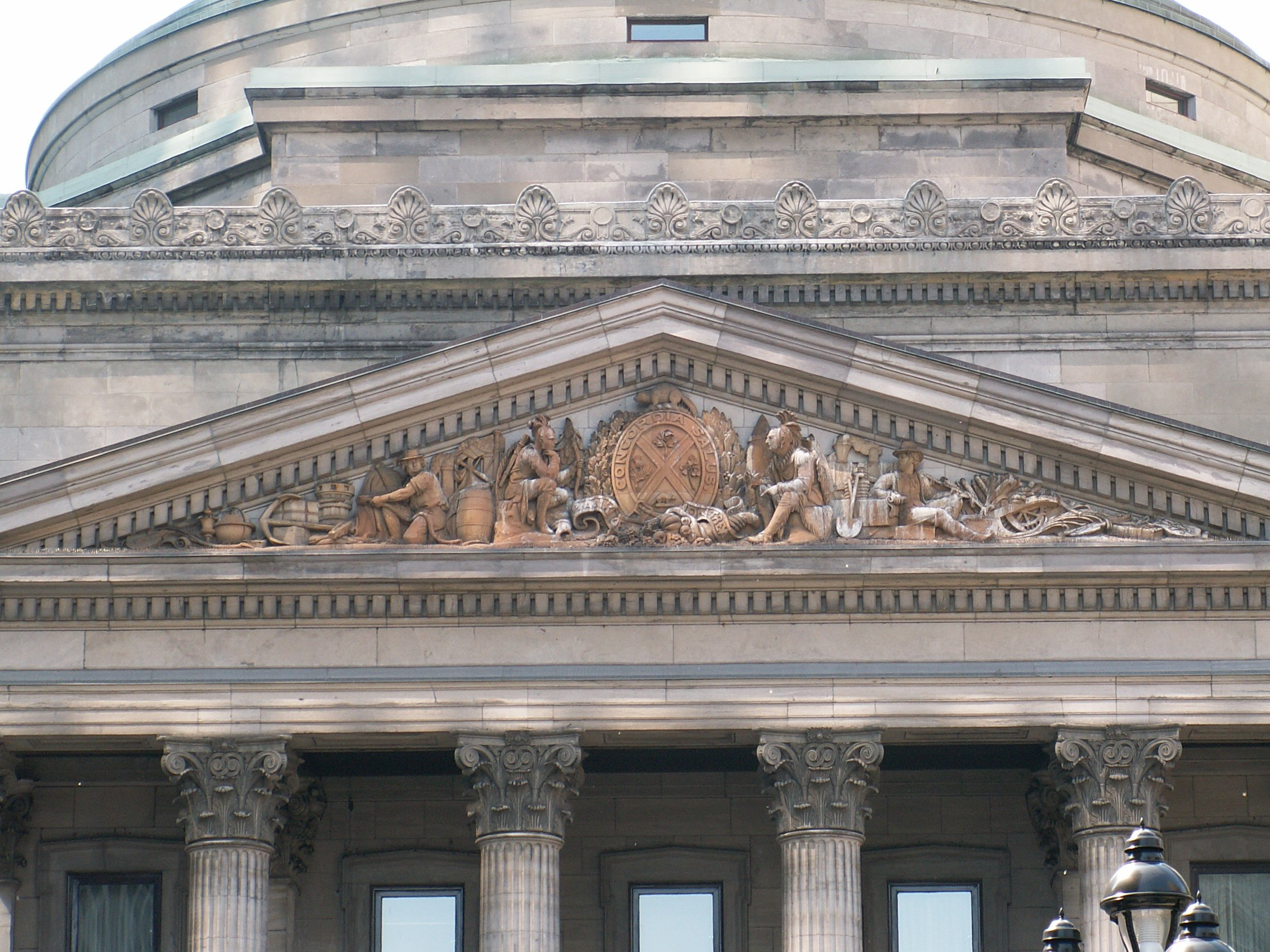
The Bank of Montreal (Banque de Montréal) in 1845.

==== Vice chairman of Bank of Montreal ====
The Banque de Montréal (Bank of Montreal) acted as Canada's central bank. Already a shareholder of the Bank of Canada, Masson bought shares of Bank of Montreal in 1824, and joined its board of directors in 1826. In 1830, Masson increased his shareholding, and reached his goal to increase his influence in the region. In 1834, Masson was appointed vice chairman of Bank of Montreal. He was also linked with the Bank of the City, Montreal, the Gore Bank and the Commercial Bank of Midland District.

==== Systematic use of credit ====
Masson was one of the few businessmen in this time to make substantial profits using credit to develop his business. He managed to double his business volume systematically using credit; but he had trouble to convince his Scottish partner to do the same.

=== Masson companies ===
Masson became the main manager of the companies of the group; he was also their major shareholder, and their names were changed to include his name: Joseph Masson, Sons and Company (Montreal); Masson, Langevin, Sons and Company (Quebec); Masson, Sons and Company (Glasgow). The last was devoted to managing the purchasing.

He was the major Canadian businessman in the 1830 years.

=== Seigneur de Terrebonne ===
In 1832, Masson acquired the seigneurie de Terrebonne, a holdover from seigneurial system of New France. It was mostly for the prestige, but Masson worked to rapidly gain a large return on this investment. He developed trade and industry, with forges and mills, offering new processes. As a result, his revenues increased to $3,000 and more.

=== Politician ===
==== Montreal and the Legislative Council of Lower Canada ====
Masson was Member of the Legislative Council of Lower Canada from 1834 to 1838.

He was also member of the Montreal City Council from December 1842. He was invited to become the Mayor of Montreal in December 1842, but declined. He was militia captain from 1823, member of the Board of Trade of Montreal, first churchwarden of Notre-Dame parish and judge of the peace.

==== Loyalist and patriot ====
Masson focused on his business above all else, and he was generally loyalist. In 1837 he was the Commissioner to administer loyalty oaths in Montreal. But he was a patriot when he hid Louis-Joseph Papineau, who had a bounty on his head in 1837, and in 1845 when he agreed to be elected the third president of the Association Saint-Jean-Baptiste.

=== Death; Family ===
Masson died in 1847 at Terrebonne. He is considered to be the first French-Canadian millionaire.

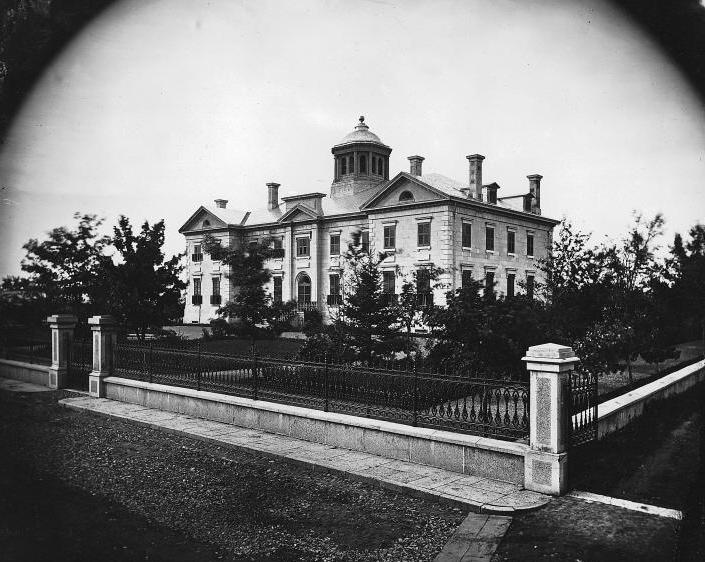
The Masson Manor, circa 1865

After his death, his wife, Marie-Geneviève-Sophie Masson (daughter of Jean-Baptiste Raymond) and her eldest sons continued Masson's companies and the managing of the seigneurie.

She created the seigneurial bureau in 1850, constructed the Masson manor from 1848 to 1854, developed the industry and the mills, and founded the Collège Masson à Terrebonne.

They had twelve children. Amongst them:

- Isidore-Édouard-Candide Masson (1826–1875), businessman and political figure, founder of Sainte-Marguerite-du-Lac-Masson, Quebec.
- Louis-Rodrigue Masson, PC (1833–1903), Lieutenant-Governor of Quebec, Minister of Militia and Defence, President of the Privy Council.

== Honours ==
- Masson was elected one of the members of the Canadian Business Hall of Fame.
- A commemorative plaque, placed in 1975 by The Commission des monuments historiques on the former Masson Manor, states that Masson served as an example to all Canadian people.
- His name was given to:
  - Masson (electoral district), a provincial electoral district in Quebec.
  - An avenue, a street, a promenade, a park in Montréal, Quebec.
- The name of his widow was given to the new Pont Sophie-Masson across the Riviere des Mille Iles.

== Bibliography ==
- "Joseph Masson". Dictionary of Canadian Biography (online ed.). University of Toronto Press. 1979–2016.
- Gérard Parizeau, "Joseph Masson, ou le sens de la durée", in La société canadienne-française au XIXè siècle, Montreal, Fides, 1975.
- Joseph Masson, dernier seigneur de Terrebonne, 1791-1847, Montréal, 1972.
- R. Rumilly, Histoire de Montréal, Fides, 1970.

== See also ==
- Canadian Business Hall of Fame
- Isidore-Édouard-Candide Masson (1826–1875), businessman and political figure, his son.
- Jean-Baptiste Raymond, his father-in-law.
- Legislative Council of Lower Canada
- Louis-Rodrigue Masson (1833–1903), Lieutenant-Governor of Quebec, another son.
- Masson (electoral district)
- Terrebonne (provincial electoral district)
- Terrebonne, Quebec
