= Antoine-Olivier Berthelet =

Canadian politician

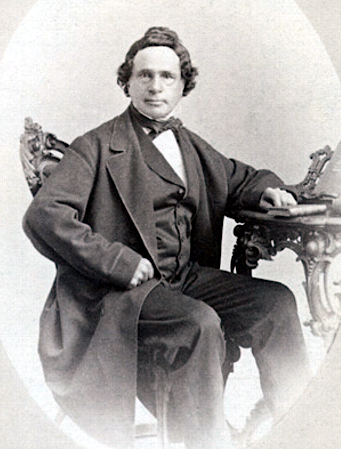
Antoine-Olivier Berthelet circa 1860

Antoine-Olivier Berthelet (May 25, 1798 – September 25, 1872) was a businessman, philanthropist and political figure in Lower Canada.

He was born in Montreal in 1798, the son of Pierre Berthelet, and studied at the Petit Séminaire de Montréal. He invested in land in the Montreal area, selling some at a profit and donating other parts to charities.

His charitable donations included the provision of property to Émilie Gamelin for use as a shelter for sick and elderly women, and the provision of food, money, and building assistance to the Misericordia Sisters.

He was elected to the Legislative Assembly of Lower Canada for Montreal East in an 1832 by-election; he opposed the Ninety-Two Resolutions. Berthelet was a member of the Fils de la Liberté, but opposed the use of force. He served on the municipal council for Montreal from 1840 to 1842. He was named to the Legislative Council of the Province of Canada in 1841 but did not accept his nomination. He was a member of the Institut canadien de Montréal, leaving the organization when it was condemned by Bishop Ignace Bourget in 1858.

He died in Montreal in 1872.
