= Edme Henry =

Canadian politician

Edmund "Edme" Henry (November 15, 1760 – September 14, 1841) was a notary and political figure in Lower Canada.

He was born in Longueuil, the son of a surgeon-major in the Régiment Royal Roussillon who settled on Saint-Pierre and Miquelon leaving his wife and family in Quebec. Henry attended the Collège Saint-Raphaël, studied law with Simon Sanguinet, received his commission as a notary in 1783 and set up practice in Montreal. In 1794, he moved to La Prairie. He was elected to the Legislative Assembly of Lower Canada for Huntingdon County in 1810. Henry served as a major in the militia during the War of 1812, taking part in the Battle of Châteauguay, and was promoted to lieutenant-colonel in 1822. Henry acted as seigneurial agent for Napier Christie Burton, the son of Gabriel Christie; he was also crown land agent for the seigneury of Prairie-de-la-Madeleine and served as commissioner for roads and bridges. In 1815, he established the villages of Christieville (later Iberville), Napierville, and Henryville. Henry was also part owner of the steamboat Edmund Henry. In 1828, he married Marie-Clotilde Girardin, the widow of Jean-Baptiste Raymond, after the death of his first wife Eunice Parker. In 1837, he founded Henry's Bank, with branches at La Prairie and Montreal; he was temporarily forced into bankruptcy after his bank manager absconded with the cash.

He died in La Prairie.
