= Louis-Rodrigue Masson =

Canadian politician (1833–1903)

The Honourable Louis-Rodrigue Masson PC
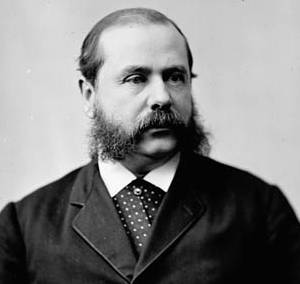

Member of the Canadian Parliament for Terrebonne
- In office September 20, 1867 – June 20, 1882
- Succeeded by: Guillaume-Alphonse Nantel

Senator for Mille Isles
- In office September 29, 1882 – November 6, 1884
- Nominated by: John A. Macdonald
- Preceded by: Léandre Dumouchel
- Succeeded by: Louis-Adélard Senécal
- In office February 3, 1890 – June 11, 1903
- Nominated by: John A. Macdonald
- Preceded by: Charles-Séraphin Rodier Jr
- Succeeded by: Laurent-Olivier David

5th Lieutenant Governor of Quebec
- In office October 4, 1884 – October 4, 1887
- Monarch: Victoria
- Governor General: The Marquess of Lansdowne
- Premier: John Jones Ross; Louis-Olivier Taillon; Honoré Mercier
- Preceded by: Théodore Robitaille
- Succeeded by: Auguste-Réal Angers

Personal details
- Born: 6 November 1833 Terrebonne, Lower Canada
- Died: 8 November 1903 (aged 70) Montreal, Quebec, Canada
- Party: Conservative
- Spouses: Louise-Rachel McKenzie (m. 1856) Cecile Burroughs (m. 1883)
- Parent(s): Joseph Masson (father); Sophie Masson (mother)
- Education: Georgetown College; College of the Holy Cross
- Cabinet: Minister of Militia and Defence (1878-1880); President of the Privy Council (1880)

Louis-Rodrigue Masson, PC (baptized Louis-François-Roderick Masson) (6 November 1833 – 8 November 1903) was a Canadian Member of Parliament, Senator, and the fifth Lieutenant Governor of Quebec. He represented Terrebonne in the House of Commons of Canada from 1867 to 1882.

== Life ==
Masson was born in Terrebonne, Lower Canada, in 1833, the son of Joseph Masson and his wife Sophie Masson. He studied at Georgetown College in Washington, D.C., and the College of the Holy Cross in Worcester, Massachusetts. He went on to study law with George-Étienne Cartier and was called to the bar in 1859 but decided not to practice law. A Conservative, from 1878 to 1880 he served under Sir John A. Macdonald as Minister of Militia and Defence, and in 1880 he was the President of the Privy Council.

From March to October 1884, he was a member of the Legislative Council of Quebec. From 1884 to 1887, he was the Lieutenant-Governor of Quebec. He published Les bourgeois de la compagnie du Nord-Ouest (1889).New International Encyclopedia

He had been named to the Senate for Mille Isles division in 1882; he resigned his seat when he was named Lieutenant-Governor. He was reappointed to the Senate in 1890 and served until June 1903. He died later that year in Montreal, Quebec.

He was the father-in-law of Liberal MP, Emmanuel Berchmans Devlin.

== Electoral record ==
By-election on 6 November 1878 Masson was appointed Minister of Militia and Defence, 19 October 1878
Party	Candidate	Votes
Conservative	Louis-Rodrigue Masson	acclaimed

1878 Canadian federal election: Terrebonne
Party	Candidate	Votes	%
Conservative	Louis-Rodrigue Masson	1,194	86.8
Unknown	B. Longpré A	181	13.2
Total valid votes		1,375	100.0

1874 Canadian federal election: Terrebonne
Party	Candidate	Votes
Conservative	Louis-Rodrigue Masson	acclaimed
Source: lop.parl.ca

1872 Canadian federal election: Terrebonne
Party	Candidate	Votes
Conservative	Louis-Rodrigue Masson	acclaimed
Source: Canadian Elections Database

1867 Canadian federal election: Terrebonne
Party	Candidate	Votes
Conservative	Louis-Rodrigue Masson	acclaimed
Source: Canadian Elections Database
