= Collège de Montréal =

Location
- 1931, Sherbrooke Street West; Montreal, Quebec; Canada
- 45.4941°N 73.5855°W

Information
- School type: Private
- Religious affiliation: Roman Catholic
- Established: 1767; 259 years ago
- Director Gen.: Patricia Steben
- Grades: 7–11
- Enrollment: +1500
- Language: French
- Website: college-montreal.qc.ca

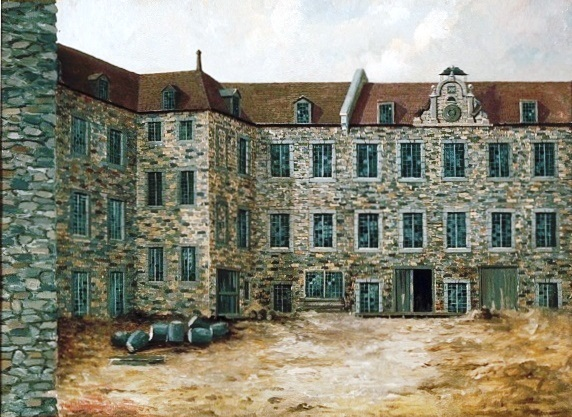
College de Montréal, Collège Street

The Collège de Montréal (French pronunciation: [kɔlɛʒ də mɔ̃ʁeal]) is a subsidized private high school for students attending grades 7–11 located in downtown Montreal, Quebec, Canada. A former Roman Catholic minor seminary, it was founded on June 1, 1767, as the Petit Séminaire of Montreal by the Sulpician Fathers. From 1773 to 1803, it was known as Collège Saint-Raphaël.

In the mid-19th century a number of former students went on to become activists for First Nations and Métis rights. They included Mohawk chief Joseph Onasakenrat and Métis leader Louis Riel.

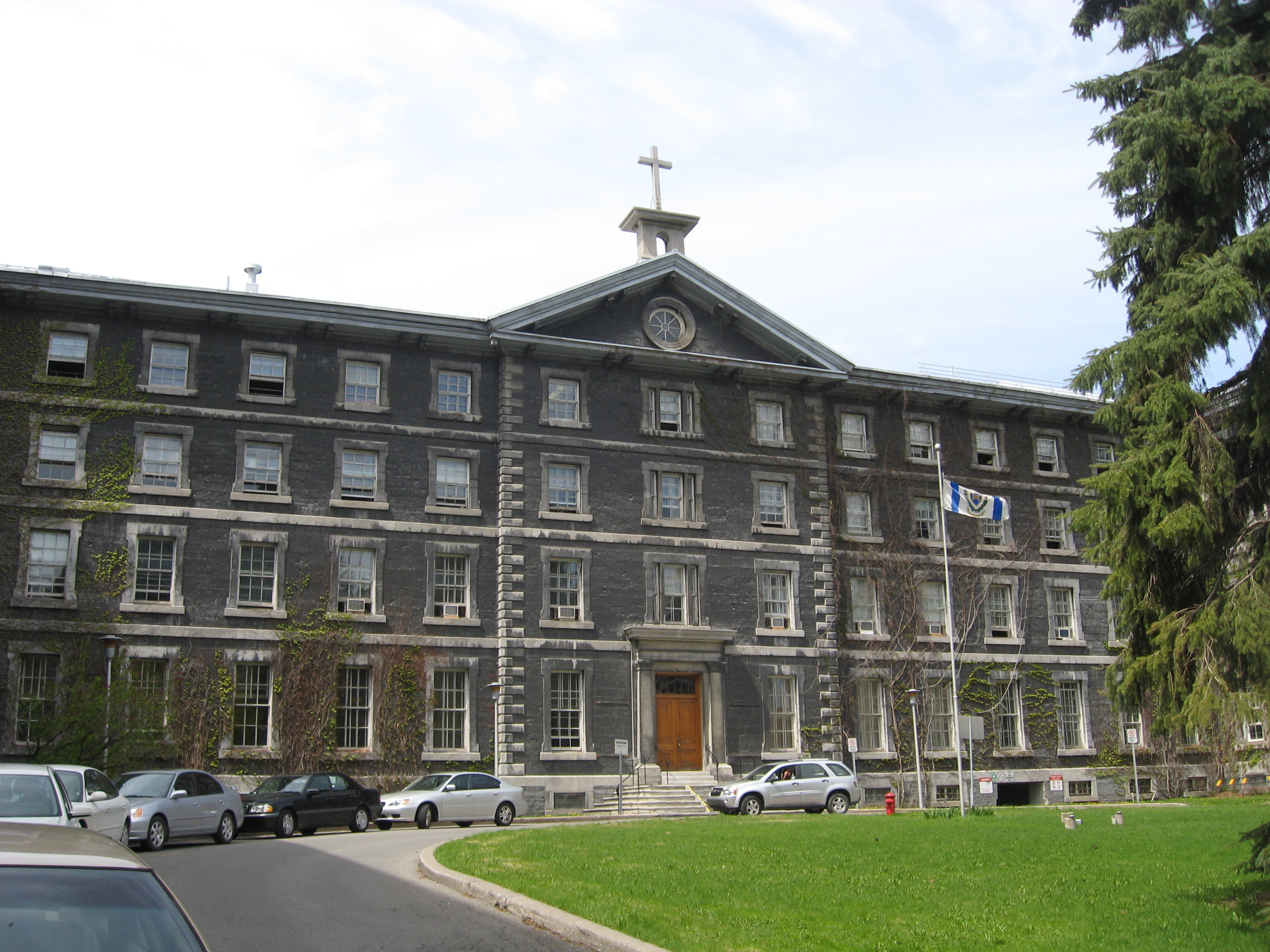
Collège de Montréal

It was the first high school in Montreal and is still considered one of the best in the province. It was particularly well regarded for its "accelerated immersion" program, in which students from English schools who were in French immersion programs could, within two years, be brought up to the same level as students who came from francophone schools. Although enrollment was previously limited to boys, the school has been co-educational since 1997. The school's performance hall, the Ermitage, was an important venue for public concerts in Montreal from its establishment in 1914 up into the 1960s.

In a widely reported article in 2008, Le Journal de Montréal found that school administrators and in particular its director-general, Jacques Giguère, had expensed many non-school related items, including high-priced furniture, a luxury hotel suite for a Christmas party, and the services of a personal trainer. Both the school's teachers union and staff union called for Giguère's resignation.

On October 31, 2017, previous director, Jocelyn Roy, dressed as Bob Marley and used blackface for Halloween. This caused controversy at the school however, this has had little effect to the school's overall reputation. Many of the Black students at the school expressed anger towards the director even though he claimed he was simply paying tribute to the singer.

== Notable alumni ==
Examples include:

- Louis Bétournay – lawyer and judge
- Guy Boucher – NHL Hockey coach.
- George-Étienne Cartier – Canadian statesman and Father of Confederation.
- Jean-Marc Fournier – Former Quebec Justice Minister.
- Gabriel Grégoire – Montreal Alouette and Grey Cup champion.
- Louis Lacoste (1798–1878), Patriote and Senator
- Louis-Hippolyte Lafontaine – the first Canadian to become Prime Minister of the United Province of Canada and the first head of a responsible government in Canada.
- Martin Lapointe – a Canadian former professional ice hockey player.
- André Lussier – physician, rheumatologist, and Professor Emeritus of the School of Medicine of the Université de Sherbrooke.
- Jean-Marie Mondelet, notary and political figure in Lower Canada
- Émile Nelligan – a francophone poet from Quebec.
- Louis-Joseph Papineau – politician, lawyer, landlord, and leader of the reformist Patriote movement before the Lower Canada Rebellion of 1837–1838.
- Jules-Maurice Quesnel, companion of Simon Fraser, Quesnel city, lake, and river bear his name in British-Columbia.
- Louis Riel (1844–1885) Canadian politician, founder of the province of Manitoba, and political and spiritual leader of the Métis people of the Canadian prairies
- David Saint-Jacques – Astronaut.
- Thomas Joseph Shahan – Rector of the Catholic University of America 1909–1928, and Auxiliary bishop of Baltimore 1914–1932.
- Denis-Benjamin Viger – Joint premier of the Province of Canada, 1843–1846

== Notable faculty ==
- J.-J. Gagnier
- Jean-Baptiste Labelle
- Benoît Poirier
- Alexis Contant
