= 2020 York Centre federal by-election =

Canadian by-election

- October 26, 2020

Riding of York Centre
- Turnout: 25.64% (▼25.64pp)
	First party	Second party	Third party
	LPC	CPC	NDP
Candidate	Ya'ara Saks	Julius Tiangson	Andrea Vásquez Jiménez
Party	Liberal	Conservative	New Democratic
Popular vote	8,253	7,552	1,046
Percentage	45.70%	41.82%	5.79%
Swing	▼4.50pp	▲5.11pp	▼4.05pp
MP before election
Michael Levitt
Liberal
Elected MP
Ya'ara Saks
Liberal

A by-election was held in the federal riding of York Centre in Ontario on October 26, 2020 following the resignation of incumbent Liberal MP Michael Levitt after 5 years in Parliament. The seat was held for the Liberals by businesswoman Ya'ara Saks, albeit on a much reduced majority. People's Party of Canada leader Maxime Bernier ran in this election to attempt to gain his party's first seat in Parliament (after having lost his seat in Beauce - the party's only seat - to the Conservatives in the 2019 election), to little success, winning just several hundred votes.

It was held on the same day as the by-election in nearby Toronto Centre.

== Background ==
=== Constituency ===
York Centre is a suburban constituency in Toronto. It contains the neighbourhoods of Westminster–Branson, Bathurst Manor, Wilson Heights, Downsview, and a small part of York University Heights.

As per the 2016 Census, 17.0% of York Centre residents are of Filipino ethnic origin and 16.0% belong to the Filipino visible minority, which are the highest such figures among all City of Toronto ridings. At the same time, the York Centre riding has the highest percentage of residents of Russian (9.5%) and Jewish (5.6%) ethnic origins (in the 2011 National Household Survey, 13.6% of York Centre residents had entered a Jewish ethnic origin).

=== Representation ===
The riding was previously considered one of the safest Liberal Party seats in Canada; electing liberal MPs near consistently since 1962.

Conservative Mark Adler won the seat in 2011, but lost it to Michael Levitt in 2015. In recent years, York Centre has been considered a marginal seat. Levitt was re-elected on an increased majority in 2019.

On August 4, 2020, Levitt announced he would be resigning as an MP, effective September 1, 2020, to become the president and CEO of the Canadian Friends of Simon Wiesenthal Centre for Holocaust Studies.

== Campaign ==
By September 7, five candidates had launched their campaigns for the Liberal nomination including 2019 Thornhill candidate Gary Gladstone, former chief fundraiser of the provincial Ontario Liberal Fund, Bobby Walman, as well as former Canadian Jewish News editor Yoni Goldstein. It was announced on September 17 that communications specialist Ya'ara Saks would be appointed as the Liberal candidate.

Rumoured candidates for the Conservative nomination included 2019 candidate Rachel Willson, York Centre MPP Roman Baber, and former parliamentary staffer Melissa Lantsman; they all declined. Wilson announced on September 18 that she would not be running. The Conservatives ultimately nominated Julius Tiangson, who previously ran for the party in Mississauga Centre in 2015.

NDP candidate Andrea Vásquez Jiménez previously ran for the seat in the 2019 election.

People's Party of Canada leader Maxime Bernier said he intended to run in either the Toronto Centre or York Centre by-election. Bernier decided he would run in York Centre when the by-elections were announced.

Perennial candidate John "The Engineer" Turmel registered as an independent candidate.

The Speaker's warrant regarding the vacancy was received on September 1, 2020; under the Parliament of Canada Act the writ for a by-election had to be dropped no later than February 28, 2021, 180 days after the Chief Electoral Officer was officially notified of the vacancy via a warrant issued by the Speaker. Under the Canada Elections Act, the minimum length of a campaign is 36 days between dropping the writ and election day.

== Results ==
Canadian federal by-election, October 26, 2020: York Centre Resignation of Michael Levitt
Party	Candidate	Votes	%	±%	Expenditures
Liberal	Ya'ara Saks	8,253	45.70	−4.50	$96,612.31
Conservative	Julius Tiangson	7,552	41.82	+5.11	
New Democratic	Andrea Vásquez Jiménez	1,046	5.79	−4.05	$2,462.86
People's	Maxime Bernier	642	3.56	–	$27,917.42
Green	Sasha Zavarella	461	2.55	−0.70	$463.46
Independent	John "The Engineer" Turmel	104	0.58	–	—
Total valid votes/expense limit		18,058	100.00	–	$105,734.74
Total rejected ballots		166	0.91	−0.61	
Turnout		18,224	25.64	−36.12	
Eligible voters		70,434			
Liberal hold		Swing		−4.81	
Source:Elections Canada

== 2019 result ==
2019 Canadian federal election: York Centre
Party	Candidate	Votes	%	±%	Expenditures
Liberal	Michael Levitt	21,680	50.20	+3.32	$93,151.84
Conservative	Rachel Willson	15,852	36.71	−7.29	$89,344.00
New Democratic	Andrea Vásquez Jiménez	4,251	9.84	+2.51	none listed
Green	Rebecca Wood	1,403	3.25	+1.45	$0.00
Total valid votes/expense limit		43,186	98.48		
Total rejected ballots		665	1.52	+0.78	
Turnout		43,851	61.76	-3.96	
Eligible voters		71,000			
Liberal hold		Swing		+5.31	
Source: Elections Canada

== See also ==
- By-elections to the 43rd Canadian Parliament
