= By-elections to the 43rd Canadian Parliament =

2019–2021 elections for vacant seats

- December 5, 2019 – August 15, 2021

2 seats in the House of Commons
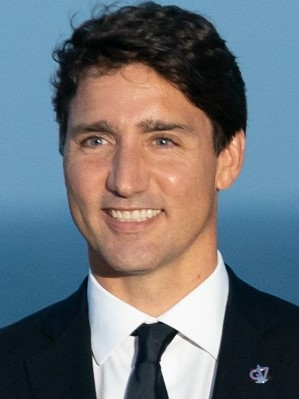

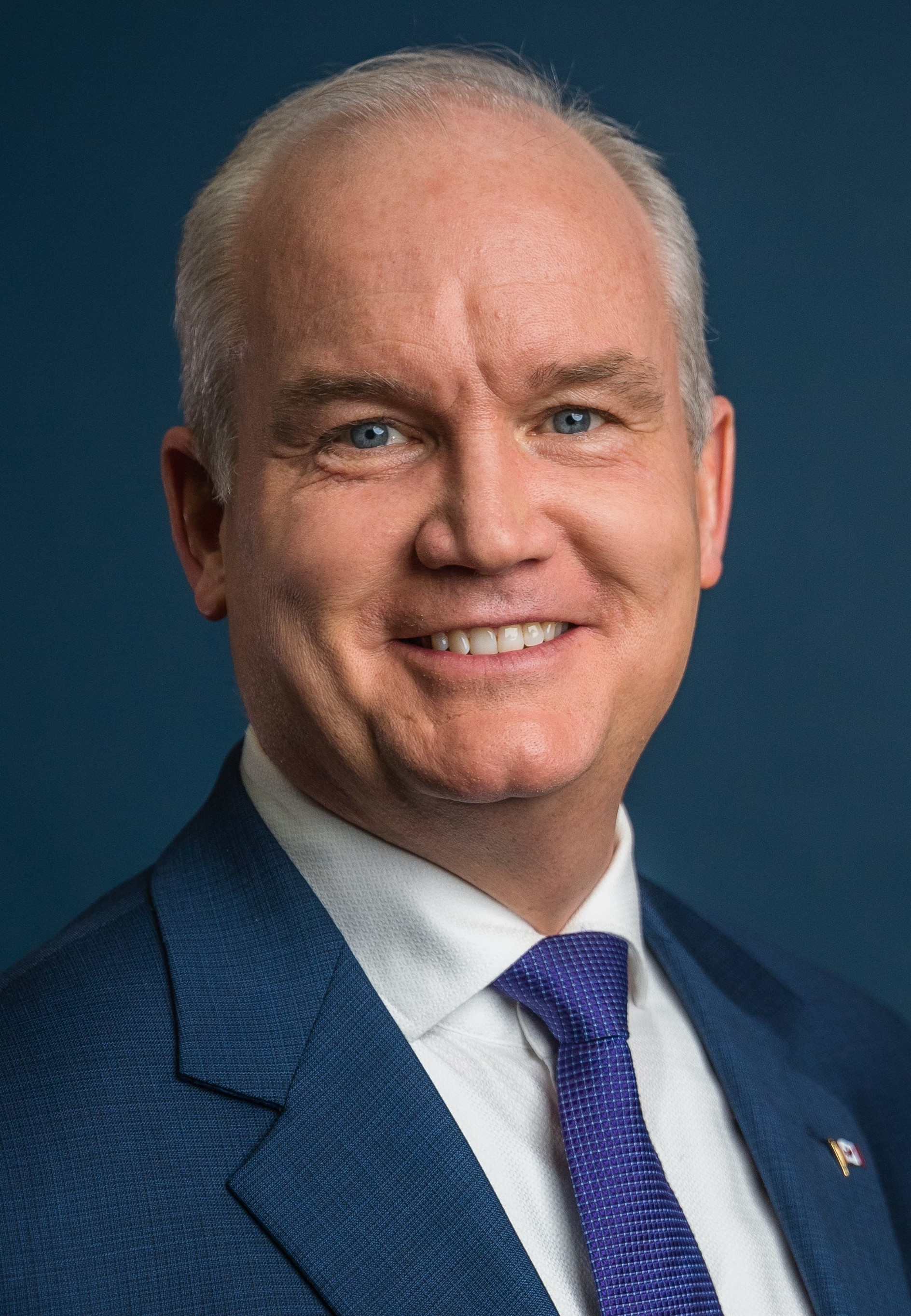

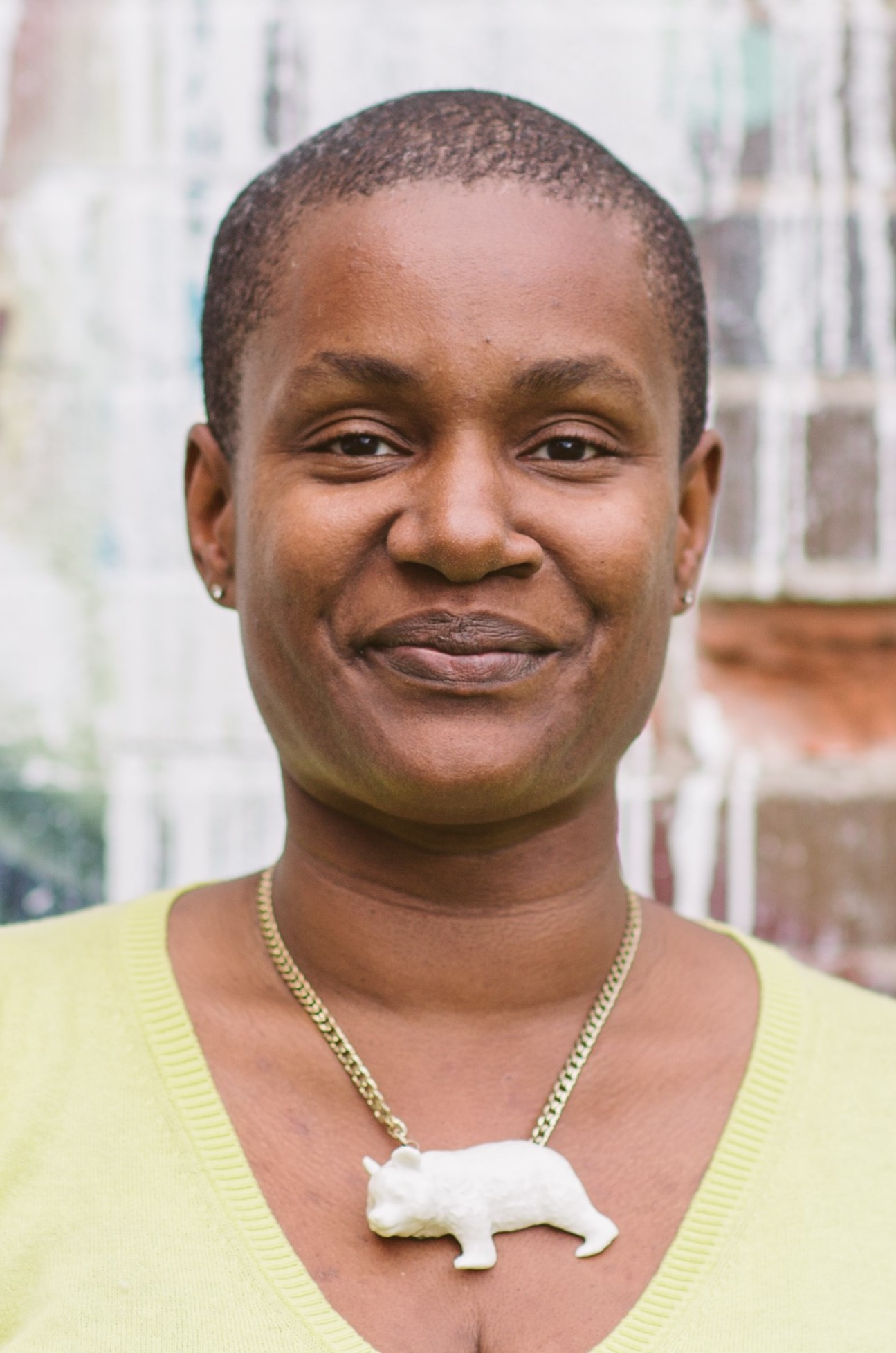

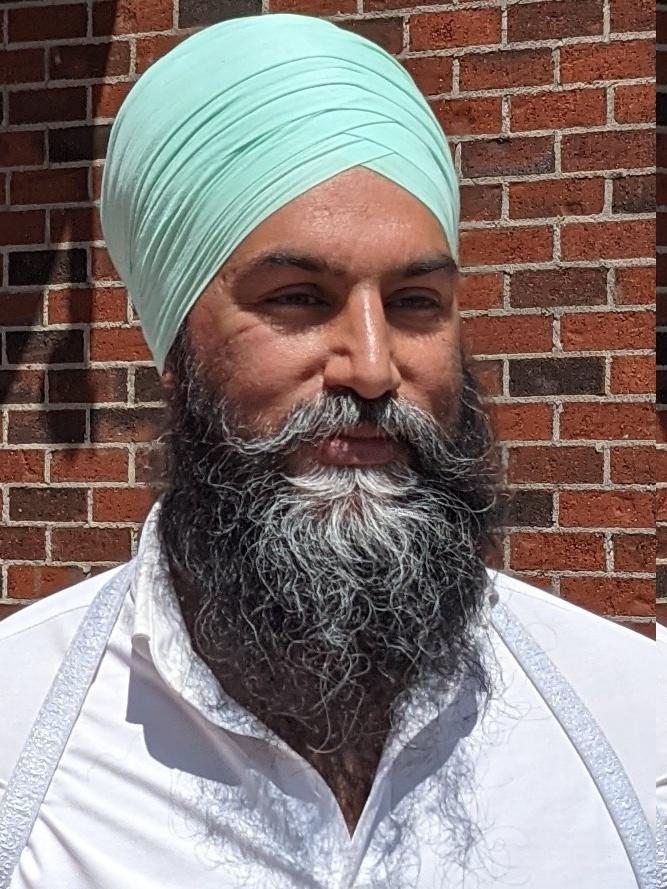
	First party	Second party
Leader	Justin Trudeau	Erin O'Toole
Party	Liberal	Conservative
Leader since	April 14, 2013	August 24, 2020
Seats up	2	0
Seats won	2	0
Seat change	Steady	Steady
Popular vote	18,832	8,987
Percentage	43.53%	20.77%
Swing	▼10.67pp	▼2.22pp
	Third party	Fourth party
Leader	Annamie Paul	Jagmeet Singh
Party	Green	New Democratic
Leader since	October 3, 2020	October 1, 2017
Seats up	0	0
Seats won	0	0
Seat change	Steady	Steady
Popular vote	8,711	5,326
Percentage	20.14%	12.31%
Swing	▲14.76pp	▼4.47pp

By-elections to the 43rd Canadian Parliament were held to fill vacancies in the House of Commons of Canada between the 2019 federal election and the 2021 federal election. The 43rd Canadian Parliament has existed since 2019 with the membership of its House of Commons having been determined by the results of the Canadian federal election held on October 21, 2019. The Liberal Party of Canada had a minority government during this Parliament.

Two by-elections were held on October 26, 2020 due to the resignation of Finance Minister Bill Morneau (Liberal, Toronto Centre) on August 17, 2020 to run for Secretary-General of the OECD, and the resignation of Michael Levitt (Liberal, York Centre) effective September 1, 2020 to become the president and CEO of the Canadian Friends of Simon Wiesenthal Centre for Holocaust Studies.

A third by-election was pending in the riding of Haldimand—Norfolk following the resignation of Conservative MP Diane Finley on May 20, 2021, but was cancelled due to the 2021 Canadian federal election being called for September 20, 2021.

The writ for a by-election must be dropped no sooner than 11 days and no later than 180 days after the Chief Electoral Officer is officially notified of a vacancy via a warrant issued by the Speaker. Under the Canada Elections Act, the minimum length of a campaign is 36 days between dropping the writ and election day.

== Summary ==
Analysis of byelections by turnout and vote share for winning candidate (vs 2019)
Riding and winning party			Turnout		Vote share for winning candidate	
Riding and winning party			%	Change (pp)	%	Change (pp)
Toronto Centre	█ Liberal	Hold	30.96	-35.12	41.98	-15.39
York Centre	█ Liberal	Hold	25.64	-36.12	45.70	-4.50

== Overview ==
By-election	Date	Incumbent	Party	Winner	Party	Cause	Retained
Toronto Centre	October 26, 2020	Bill Morneau	Liberal	Marci Ien	Liberal	Resigned to run for Secretary-General of the OECD	Yes
York Centre	October 26, 2020	Michael Levitt	Liberal	Ya'ara Saks	Liberal	Resigned to become CEO of the Canadian Friends of Simon Wiesenthal Centre for Holocaust Studies	Yes

== October 26, 2020 by-elections ==
=== Scheduling ===
Prime Minister Justin Trudeau announced both by-elections on Friday September 18, along with Liberal candidates for each riding. Annamie Paul, the newly elected leader of the Green Party and Green candidate for Toronto Centre, called on the government to delay the by-elections, citing increased restrictions on movement and activity in Toronto in light of rising cases of COVID-19. Trudeau rejected changing the schedule, saying that the by-elections have to be held within a certain time period of the seats becoming vacant, and that the pandemic may be worse later in the year. Any changes to by-election dates would be approved by the cabinet, but would have to first be proposed by the independent Chief Electoral Officer. Paul responded by calling on parliament to pass new legislation – proposed by Elections Canada – that would give the agency more flexibility to respond to the pandemic.

=== Toronto Centre ===
The riding of Toronto Centre was vacated on August 17, 2020 following the resignation of Liberal MP and Minister of Finance Bill Morneau to seek election as Secretary General of the OECD Morneau had represented the riding since 2015, while the Liberals have held the riding since 1988.

Note: Candidates' names are as registered with Elections Canada.

Canadian federal by-election, October 26, 2020: Toronto Centre Resignation of Bill Morneau
Party	Candidate	Votes	%	±%
Liberal	Marci Ien	10,579	41.98	–15.39
Green	Annamie Paul	8,250	32.73	+25.66
New Democratic	Brian Chang	4,280	16.98	–5.29
Conservative	Benjamin Gauri Sharma	1,435	5.69	–6.44
People's	Baljit Bawa	271	1.08	–
Libertarian	Keith Komar	135	0.54	–
Independent	Kevin Clarke	123	0.49	–
Free Party Canada	Dwayne Cappelletti	74	0.29	–
No affiliation	Above Znoneofthe	56	0.22	–
Total valid votes/Expense limit		25,203		
Total rejected ballots				
Turnout		25,203	30.96	-35.12
Eligible voters		81,400		
Liberal hold		Swing		-20.53

=== York Centre ===
The riding of York Centre became vacant on September 1, 2020, when Liberal MP Michael Levitt resigned to become the president and CEO of the Canadian Friends of Simon Wiesenthal Centre for Holocaust Studies. The riding had been held by Levitt since 2015, when he won the riding from Conservative incumbent Mark Adler.

By September 7, five candidates had launched their campaigns for the Liberal nomination including 2019 Thornhill candidate Gary Gladstone, former chief fundraiser of the provincial Ontario Liberal Fund, Bobby Walman, as well as former Canadian Jewish News editor Yoni Goldstein. It was announced on September 17 that communications specialist Ya'ara Saks would be appointed as the Liberal candidate.

Rumoured candidates for the Conservative nomination included 2019 candidate Rachel Willson, York Centre MPP Roman Baber, and former parliamentary staffer Melissa Lantsman; they all declined. Wilson announced on September 18 that she would not be running. The Conservatives ultimately nominated Julius Tiangson, who previously ran for the party in Mississauga Centre in 2015.

The NDP candidate, Andrea Vásquez Jiménez, previously ran for the seat in the 2019 election.

People's Party of Canada leader Maxime Bernier said he intended to run in either the Toronto Centre or York Centre by-election. Bernier decided he would run in York Centre when the by-elections were announced.

Perennial candidate John "The Engineer" Turmel registered as an independent candidate.

The Speaker's warrant regarding the vacancy was received on September 1, 2020; under the Parliament of Canada Act the writ for a by-election had to be dropped no later than February 28, 2021, 180 days after the Chief Electoral Officer was officially notified of the vacancy via a warrant issued by the Speaker. Under the Canada Elections Act, the minimum length of a campaign is 36 days between dropping the writ and election day.

Note: Candidates' names are as registered with Elections Canada.

Canadian federal by-election, October 26, 2020: York Centre Resignation of Michael Levitt
Party	Candidate	Votes	%	±%
Liberal	Ya'ara Saks	8,253	45.70	−4.50
Conservative	Julius Tiangson	7,552	41.82	+5.11
New Democratic	Andrea Vásquez Jiménez	1,046	5.79	−4.05
People's	Max Bernier	642	3.56	–
Green	Sasha Zavarella	461	2.55	−0.7
Independent	John The Engineer Turmel	104	0.58	–
Total valid votes/Expense limit		18,058		
Total rejected ballots				
Turnout		18,058	25.64	−36.12
Eligible voters		70,434		
Liberal hold		Swing		−4.81

== Cancelled by-election ==
=== Haldimand—Norfolk ===
The riding of Haldimand—Norfolk had been vacant effective May 20, 2021 following the resignation of Conservative MP Diane Finley announced on May 11, 2021. The riding had been held by Finley since it was created in 2004.

The date of the by-election had to be announced between May 31, 2021 and November 16, 2021. However, the by-election was cancelled and replaced by the federal election which was called on August 15 to be held on September 20.

Prior to Finley's resignation, lawyer and 2020 Conservative leadership candidate Leslyn Lewis had been nominated as the party's candidate in the constituency for the next federal election, while Karen Matthews had been nominated as the Liberal candidate.

== See also ==
- List of federal by-elections in Canada
