= Michael Kerzner =

Canadian politician

The Honourable Michael Kerzner ECO MPP
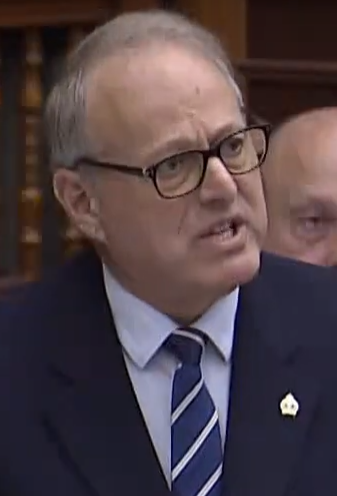
- Kerzner in 2024

Solicitor General of Ontario
- Incumbent
- Assumed office June 24, 2022
- Premier: Doug Ford
- Preceded by: Sylvia Jones

Member of the Ontario Provincial Parliament for York Centre
- Incumbent
- Assumed office June 2, 2022
- Preceded by: Roman Baber

Personal details
- Born: Michael Shawn Kerzner
- Party: Progressive Conservative
- Spouse: Rochelle Kerzner
- Education: York University
- Profession: Politician, Businessman

Michael Shawn Kerzner ECO MPP is a Canadian politician who was in June 2022 named Solicitor General of Ontario. He was elected to the Legislative Assembly of Ontario in the 2022 provincial election. He represents the riding of York Centre as a member of the Progressive Conservative Party of Ontario.

== Biography ==
Kerzner is Jewish. His parents are Max and Dolly Kerzner. His father was a chartered accountant. His father's parents, Sam and Sarah Kerzner, emigrated to Canada in 1930 from Stopnica, Poland. Everyone in his grandfather's family was killed during the Holocaust. His maternal grandfather, Murray Penwick, was born in Toronto where he opened a pharmacy. His maternal grandmother, Tilly Penwick, is from England, and emigrated to Canada in her youth.

Kerzner attended York University, graduating with a B.A. (Hons.) in 1986. After university he worked in the construction business, building commercial buildings, and then in 2015 started doing genetic testing at DNALabs Canada. He is a bioscience and technology entrepreneur. He lives in York Centre.

Kerzner succeeded to the seat of independent MPP Roman Baber. Baber had been elected as a Progressive Conservative but was expelled from the PC caucus on January 15, 2021, for his COVID-19 lockdown stances. It was expected that Baber would run against Kerzner in the general election, but Baber instead opted to run in the 2022 Conservative Party of Canada leadership race.

On June 24, 2022, Kerzner was named Solicitor General of Ontario by Premier Doug Ford.

== Politics ==
Kerzner faced criticism in February 2023 when a member of his staff posted a series of joyful selfies in a provincial jail. Criticism centred on the lack of professionalism, trivialization of incarceration and questions on how a member of Kerzner's staff was able to access a photography-restricted area and take photos.

In April 2026, Kerzner drew criticism after it was revealed that 157 inmates had been improperly released from Ontario correctional facilities between 2021 and 2025 during his tenure as solicitor general. After incorrectly telling the legislature that all had been immediately re-apprehended, despite records showing some remained at large for months, Kerzner apologized and claimed he had meant that police were notified immediately. Opposition parties accused him of misleading the legislature and called for his resignation.

In April 2026, Kerzner came under scrutiny after government records revealed that his office had sought a taxpayer-funded replacement for his government SUV after it was stolen and damaged, insisting on a three-row vehicle SUV with staff rejected smaller and more affordable options. Interim Ontario Liberal leader John Fraser accused Kerzner of focusing on "his personal needs for his government vehicle" instead of addressing failures within the correctional system.

In May 2026 Kerzner tabled an omnibus bill that would grant him the power direct police boards. Opposition parties and civil liberties advocates raised serious concerns that the legislation blurred the separation between elected officials and police oversight bodies, warning that government-directed priorities could undermine public confidence in police accountability.

== Electoral history ==
2025 Ontario general election
Party	Candidate	Votes	%	±%
Progressive Conservative	Michael Kerzner	16,416	54.06	+8.03
Liberal	Sam Nestico	10,823	35.64	+3.70
New Democratic	Natalie Van Halteren	1,700	5.60	–8.39
Green	Courtney Martin	658	2.17	–0.67
New Blue	Johnny Blythe	309	1.02	–0.44
Special Needs	Lionel Poizner	212	0.70	+0.26
Populist	Jeffrey Anisman	140	0.46	N/A
Moderate	Parviz Isgandadrov	111	0.37	+0.09
Total valid votes		30,369	98.88	+0.07
Total rejected, unmarked and declined ballots		345	1.12	–0.07
Turnout		30,714	39.67	+0.73
Eligible voters		76,546		
Progressive Conservative hold		Swing		+2.17
Source: Elections Ontario

2022 Ontario general election: York Centre
Party	Candidate	Votes	%	±%	Expenditures
Progressive Conservative	Michael Kerzner	12,947	46.03	−4.12	$79,866
Liberal	Shelley Brown	8,984	31.94	+10.54	$74,566
New Democratic	Frank Chu	3,935	13.99	−9.45	$16,511
Green	Alison Lowney	799	2.84	+0.55	$0
Ontario Party	Nick Balaskas	679	2.41		$988
New Blue	Don Pincivero	411	1.46		$0
None of the Above	Mark Dewdney	169	0.60	−0.67	$0
Special Needs	Lionel Wayne Poizner	124	0.44		$0
Moderate	Parviz Isgandarov	80	0.28	−0.09	$780
Total valid votes/expense limit		28,128	98.81	+0.30	$102,341
Total rejected, unmarked, and declined ballots		339	1.19	-0.30	
Turnout		28,467	38.94	-13.98	
Eligible voters		72,576			
Progressive Conservative gain from Independent		Swing		−7.33	
Source(s): "Summary of Valid Votes Cast for Each Candidate" (PDF). Elections Ontario. 2022. Archived from the original on May 18, 2023.; "Statistical Summary by Electoral District" (PDF). Elections Ontario. 2022. Archived from the original on May 21, 2023.
