= Economic Club of Canada =

Canadian non-partisan forum

Coordinates: 43°39′3.74″N 79°22′57.13″W

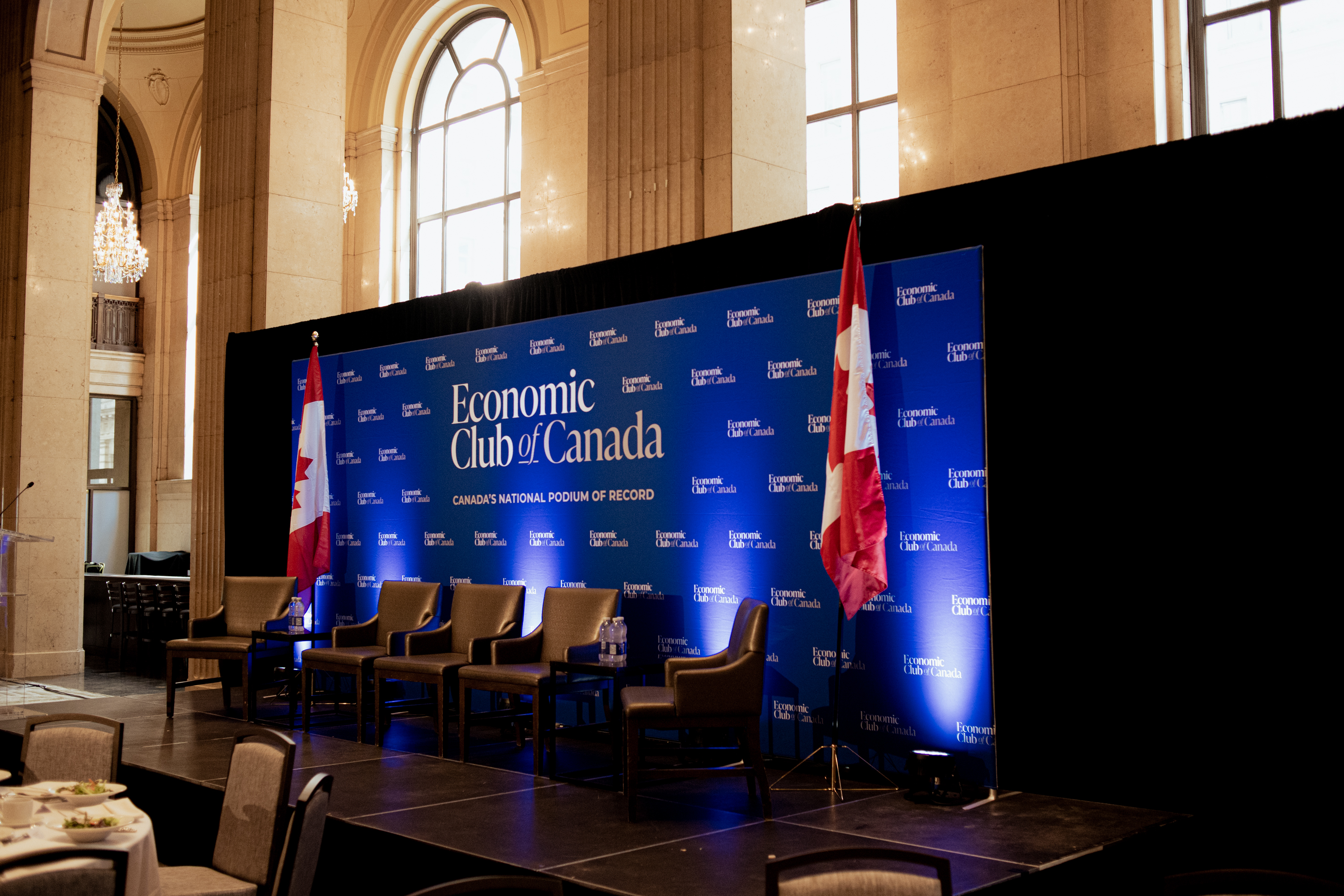
Stage before an event in June 2023

The Economic Club of Canada is a non-partisan speaker’s forum based in Canada, and modelled on American societies such as the Economic Club of New York, or the Economic Club of Pittsburgh, although the latter organizations are not-for-profit. The Canadian organization meets three times a week and provides a platform for policy makers and business leaders. Notable former speakers have included John Tory, Bill Clinton, Kathleen Wynne, Mike Savage and John McCallum. It markets itself as a business elite organization that can turn events around quickly, thus making its events more timely and newsworthy. Members are drawn from the business, industry and finance sectors. Speeches are typically held in the modern hotels in various cities over the lunch hour. Tickets to the events can be individually sold or by table to the companies, organizations or private members.

== History ==
The Economic Club of Toronto was established by Mark Adler (politician) in Toronto, Ontario, Canada in 2003.

In 2008, the Club was re-launched as the Economic Club of Canada and has hosted events in Calgary, Montreal, Ottawa and Vancouver.

Rhiannon Traill was the president and CEO of the Economic Club of Canada, and Natasha Morano was the vice president, as of February 2016. Notably, the organization boasts an all-female executive as of 2016.

In 2021 The Economic Club of Canada was acquired by Big Picture Conferences. The day-to-day operations is now run by Stephanie Gadbois, Managing Director, alongside her leadership team of event professionals.

== Notable members ==
Notable members of the Economic Club of Canada include:

- Justin Trudeau
- Roger Martin
