= Ya'ara Saks =

Canadian politician

The Honourable Ya'ara Saks PC
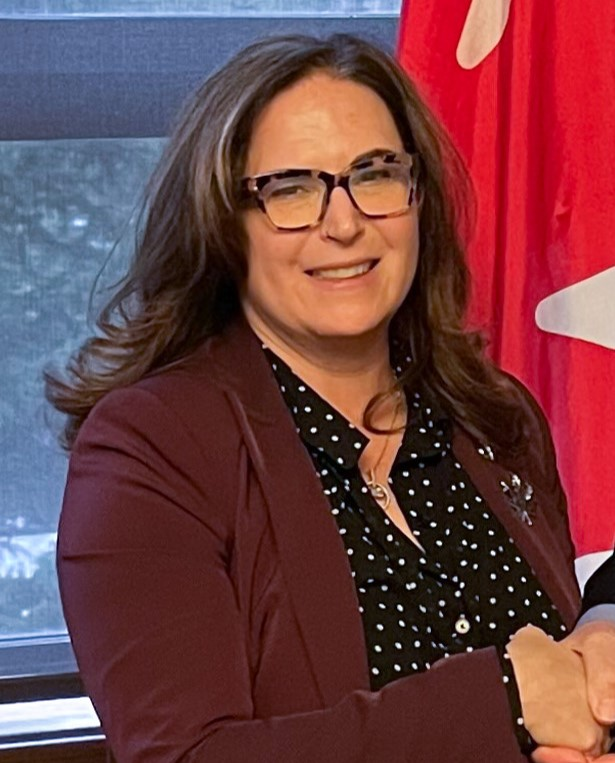

Minister of Mental Health and Addictions Associate Minister of Health
- In office July 26, 2023 – March 14, 2025
- Prime Minister: Justin Trudeau
- Preceded by: Carolyn Bennett
- Succeeded by: Position abolished

Member of Parliament for York Centre
- In office October 26, 2020 – March 23, 2025
- Preceded by: Michael Levitt
- Succeeded by: Roman Baber

Personal details
- Born: March 9, 1973 (age 53) Toronto, Ontario, Canada
- Citizenship: Canada, Israel
- Party: Liberal
- Education: McGill University, Hebrew University

Ya'ara Saks (Hebrew: יערה זקס; born March 9, 1973) is a Canadian politician who served as the Minister of Mental Health and Addictions and Associate Minister of Health. She was elected to the House of Commons of Canada in a by-election on October 26, 2020, following the resignation of Michael Levitt, and later re-elected on September 20, 2021. She represented the riding of York Centre as a member of the Liberal Party of Canada until her defeat in the 2025 Canadian federal election, the only sitting Liberal MP in Toronto defeated in that election.

== Early life ==
A dual citizen of Canada and of Israel, Saks was born in Toronto to an Israeli father, and a Canadian Jewish mother. She is Ashkenazi. She has lived in both Israel (1995 to 2006) and Canada. She graduated from McGill University with a BA in Middle East Studies and Political Science in 1995, and then completed her Master's degree in International relations and Diplomacy at the Hebrew University of Jerusalem, at the same time working in Jerusalem's City Hall's foreign relations under Ehud Olmert who was mayor at the time. Before entering politics, Saks owned a yoga studio in York Centre (in the north end of Toronto) and was the director of Trauma Practice for Healthy Communities, a charity that focuses on mental health.

== Political career ==
Saks won the 2020 York Centre federal by-election as a member of the Liberal Party of Canada.

Upon being sworn in as a member of Canada's House of Commons (along with fellow rookie parliamentarian Marci Ien) it took the number of female MPs in Canada to 100, which, at 30%, is the highest proportion of women in that chamber in its history.

In December 2021 she was appointed Parliamentary Secretary to the Minister of Families, Children and Social Development.

In July 2023 she was appointed Minister of Mental Health and Addictions and Associate Minister of Health. After Mark Carney became Prime Minister, Saks was shuffled out of Cabinet.

== Political views ==
=== Views on antisemitism and Israeli politics ===
Saks has been deeply critical of the direction of the Netanyahu government in Israel for its treatment of its Israeli Arab citizens and the 2018 Nation-State law and has expressed the concern that it is leading Israel to be "deeply racist towards its minorities and ... not to see itself as a light and shelter or future home to asylum seekers fleeing war," as well as its elevation of leadership at the expense of the justice system.

Saks has stated that she is "an unapologetic Zionist who believes passionately in the State of Israel" and that she condemns the BDS Movement (boycott, divestment and sanctions against Israel), considering it antisemitic.

Saks has spoken publicly and repeatedly about antisemitism and online hate, including remarks during parliamentary debate on the 2022 Freedom Convoy protests that referenced concerns raised by researchers about extremist symbolism and coded language.

In February 2022, when speaking in the House about confirming the Emergencies Act in response to the "Freedom Convoy" protest, Saks referenced concerns about antisemitic symbolism associated with the phrase "Honk Honk" (a phrase used by convoy supporters in reference to truck horns). Saks noted that while the phrase was widely used by protestors to mimic truck horns, some observers and researchers had previously identified it as a coded slogan used by white supremicists and neo-Nazi communities as a Dog whistle (politics) for "Heil Hitler". (often abbreviated "HH") She asked how much further evidence of such vitriol was necessary to address online hate and extremist content. Saks provided evidence for her claim on Twitter, citing antifascist researcher and organizer Gwen Snyder, who posted a 4chan post that promoted using the claim as a prank—similar to the site's previous hoax that the "OK" hand gesture was code for "white power".

The Canadian Anti-Hate Network, in reporting on Saks's comments and related context, noted that "Honk Honk" had been circulated in extremist online spaces prior to the convoy and that Saks's remarks highlighted concerns about subtle forms of antisemitism and hate speech in contemporary protest movements.

=== Ministerial work and policy initiatives ===
As Minister of Mental Health and Addictions and Associate Minister of Health, Ya'ara Saks advanced federal initiatives focused on mental health, substance use, family safety, and health equity. She announced $6 million in funding through the Youth Substance Use Prevention Program to support community-based prevention initiatives aimed at reducing substance-use related harms among young people. Saks also announced investments under the Promoting Health Equity: Mental Health of Black Canadians Fund, supporting projects to improve access to culturally responsive mental health services for Black communities. She further announced additional federal funding to expand community mental health supports in Nova Scotia, including grief and emotional wellness services, and funding for recovery and harm-reduction services in the Tłı̨chǫ region of the Northwest Territories through the Substance Use and Addictions Program.

Saks supported national suicide prevention efforts, including the implementation of the 988 Suicide Crisis Helpline, and the establishment of the Youth Mental Health Fund. In 2025, she supported the development and federal launch of Canada's first Clinical Practice Guideline for the Management of Perinatal Mood, Anxiety and Related Disorders, which provides evidence-based guidance for the identification and treatment of perinatal mental health conditions during pregnancy and the postpartum period, accompanied by a national clinician implementation guide.

Her work as Associate Minister of Health included contributions to women's health initiatives, including policy development related to breast cancer screening guidelines.

=== Family safety and gender-based violence ===
In the area of family safety, Saks announced more than $17.5 million in federal funding over five years to support projects aimed at preventing family and gender-based violence across Canada."Government of Canada funds new initiatives to prevent family and gender-based violence". Women and Gender Equality Canada. She also contributed to legislative development related to Keira's Law, which addresses coercive control in intimate partner relationships.

=== Public safety and countering hate ===
Saks has advocated within government for measures addressing national security and hate-motivated activity, including support for the listing of the Islamic Revolutionary Guard Corps (IRGC) and Samidoun as terrorist entities and for closing associated financial and corporate loopholes. She also contributed to federal policy development related to combating antisemitism, including work associated with the IHRA Handbook, which supports implementation of the International Holocaust Remembrance Alliance definition of antisemitism across federal institutions.

== Electoral record ==
2025 Canadian federal election: York Centre
** Preliminary results — Not yet official **
Party	Candidate	Votes	%	±%	Expenditures
Conservative	Roman Baber	26,082	54.82	+16.97	
Liberal	Ya'ara Saks	20,303	42.68	–4.61	
New Democratic	Yusuf Ulukanligil	1,189	2.50	–7.68	
Total valid votes/expense limit					
Total rejected ballots					
Turnout		47,574	63.63		
Eligible voters		74,764			
Conservative gain from Liberal		Swing		+10.79	
Source: Elections Canada

2021 Canadian federal election: York Centre
Party	Candidate	Votes	%	±%	Expenditures
Liberal	Ya'ara Saks	17,430	47.3	+1.6	$106,060.49
Conservative	Joel Yakov Etienne	13,949	37.8	-4.0	$98,838.17
New Democratic	Kemal Ahmed	3,753	10.2	+4.4	$5,586.43
People's	Nixon Nguyen	1,726	4.7	+1.1	$1,816.68
Total valid votes/expense limit		36,858	98.6	–	$106,565.66
Total rejected ballots		507	1.4		
Turnout		37,365	53.4		
Eligible voters		69,971			
Liberal hold		Swing		+2.8	
Source: Elections Canada

Canadian federal by-election, October 26, 2020: York Centre Resignation of Michael Levitt
Party	Candidate	Votes	%	±%	Expenditures
Liberal	Ya'ara Saks	8,253	45.70	−4.50	$96,612.31
Conservative	Julius Tiangson	7,552	41.82	+5.11	
New Democratic	Andrea Vásquez Jiménez	1,046	5.79	−4.05	$2,462.86
People's	Maxime Bernier	642	3.56	–	$27,917.42
Green	Sasha Zavarella	461	2.55	−0.70	$463.46
Independent	John "The Engineer" Turmel	104	0.58	–	—
Total valid votes/expense limit		18,058	100.00	–	$105,734.74
Total rejected ballots		166	0.91	−0.61	
Turnout		18,224	25.64	−36.12	
Eligible voters		70,434			
Liberal hold		Swing		−4.81	
Source:Elections Canada
