= Bathurst Manor =

- Neighbourhood
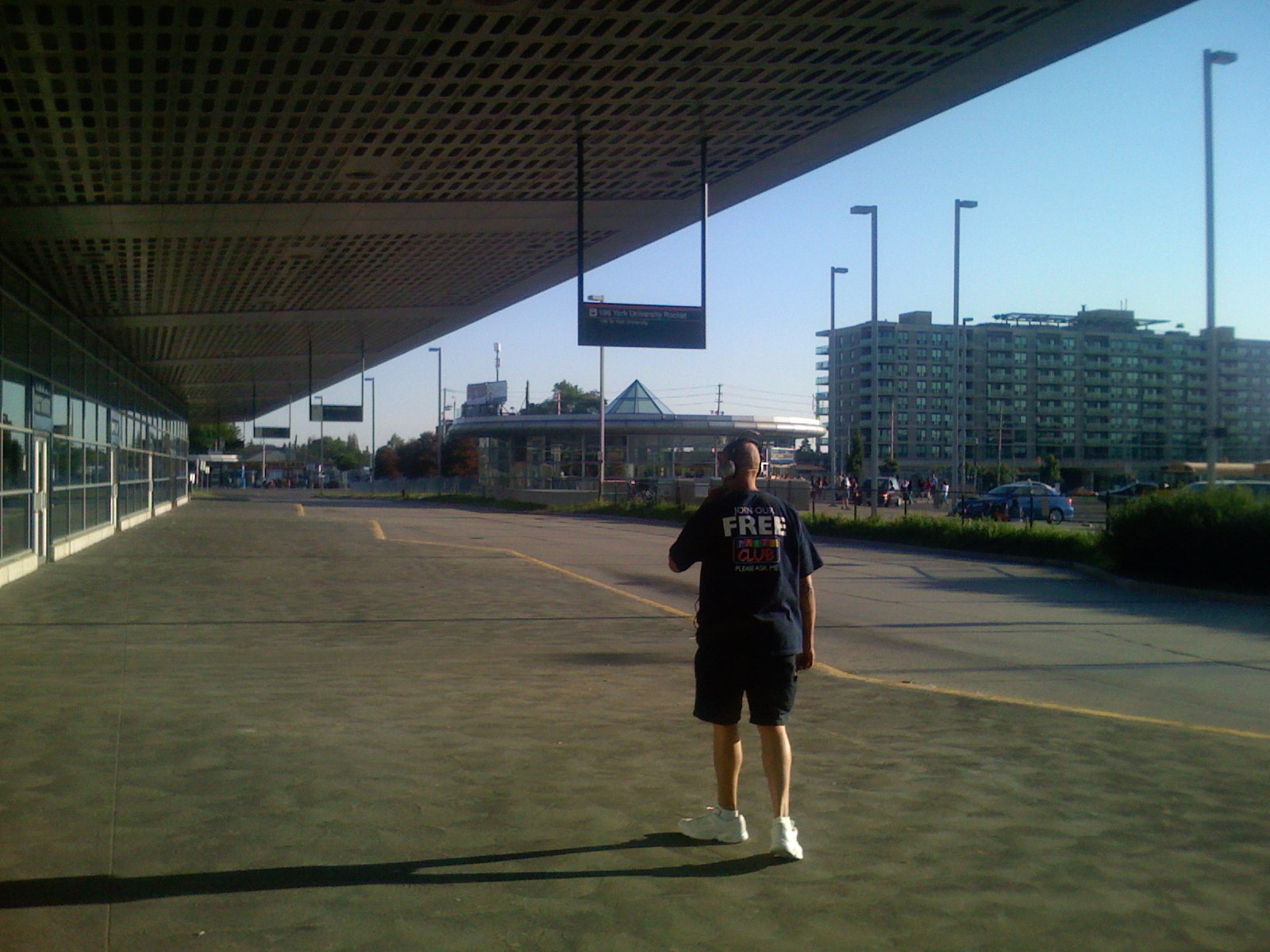
- View of Bathurst Manor from Sheppard West station

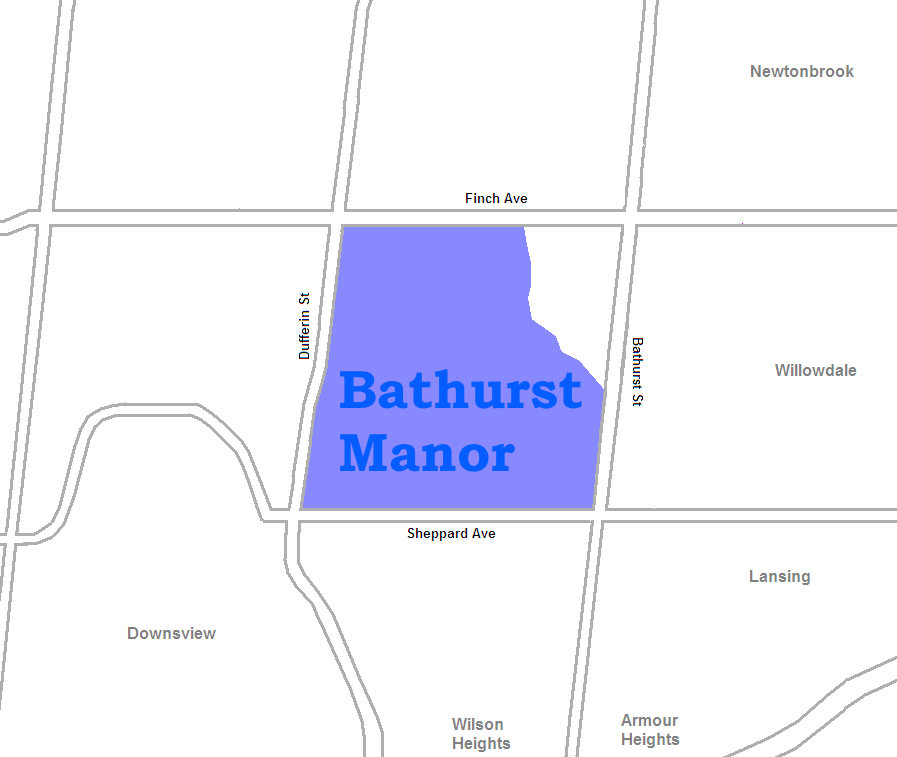

- Location in Toronto
- Coordinates: 43°45′46″N 79°27′25″W
- Country: Canada
- Province: Ontario
- City: Toronto
- Municipality established: 1850 York Township
- Changed municipality: 1922 North York from York Township
- Changed municipality: 1998 Toronto from North York

Government
  - Toronto City Council: James Pasternak (Ward 6 York Centre)
  - MPs: Roman Baber
  - MPPs: Michael Kerzner

Population (2006)
  - Total: 14,945
- Time zone: UTC−5 (EST)
  - Summer (DST): UTC−4 (EDT)
- Postal code: M3H
- Area codes: 416, 647

Bathurst Manor is a neighbourhood of Toronto, Ontario, Canada, located in northern Toronto in the former suburb of North York. It sits on a plateau bounded on the north by Finch Avenue West, on the west by Dufferin Street, on the east by the Don River (west branch), and on the south by Sheppard Avenue West. The area is also regarded as part of the Downsview postal area as designated by Canada Post. It is part of the former city of North York, which merged with five other municipalities and a regional government to form the new "City of Toronto" in 1998. It is part of the federal and provincial electoral district York Centre, and Toronto electoral ward 10: York Centre (East). In 2006, it had a population of 14,615.

== History ==
Bathurst Manor is one of several Jewish-populated neighbourhoods on Bathurst Street. It is a suburban community built between 1954 and the early 1960s. While most of the population was originally Jewish, and several synagogue congregations are located in the neighbourhood, there are also significant Italian, Russian and Filipino populations.

In 1996, the Toronto Transit Commission extended subway service to the area with the opening of the Sheppard West station, at Allen Road and Sheppard Avenue, allowing a thirty-minute train ride to Union Station at the southern cusp of downtown Toronto.

== Demographics ==
The community is home to the Canadian headquarters of B'nai Brith at 15 Hove St, the Bathurst Jewish Community Centre (BJCC), the Lipa Green Building at 4588 Bathurst St is for Jewish Community Services. Bathurst Manor's Top ten ethnic and cultural groups (by ancestry) in 2016:

- 13% - Filipino
- 13% - Russian
- 11% - Italian
- 11% - Polish
- 9% - Canadian
- 6% - Jews
- 6% - Chinese
- 5% - English
- 5% - Ukrainian
- 4% - Greek

The percentage of population below the poverty line dropped from 22% (in 1996) to 18% (in 2001).

== Education ==
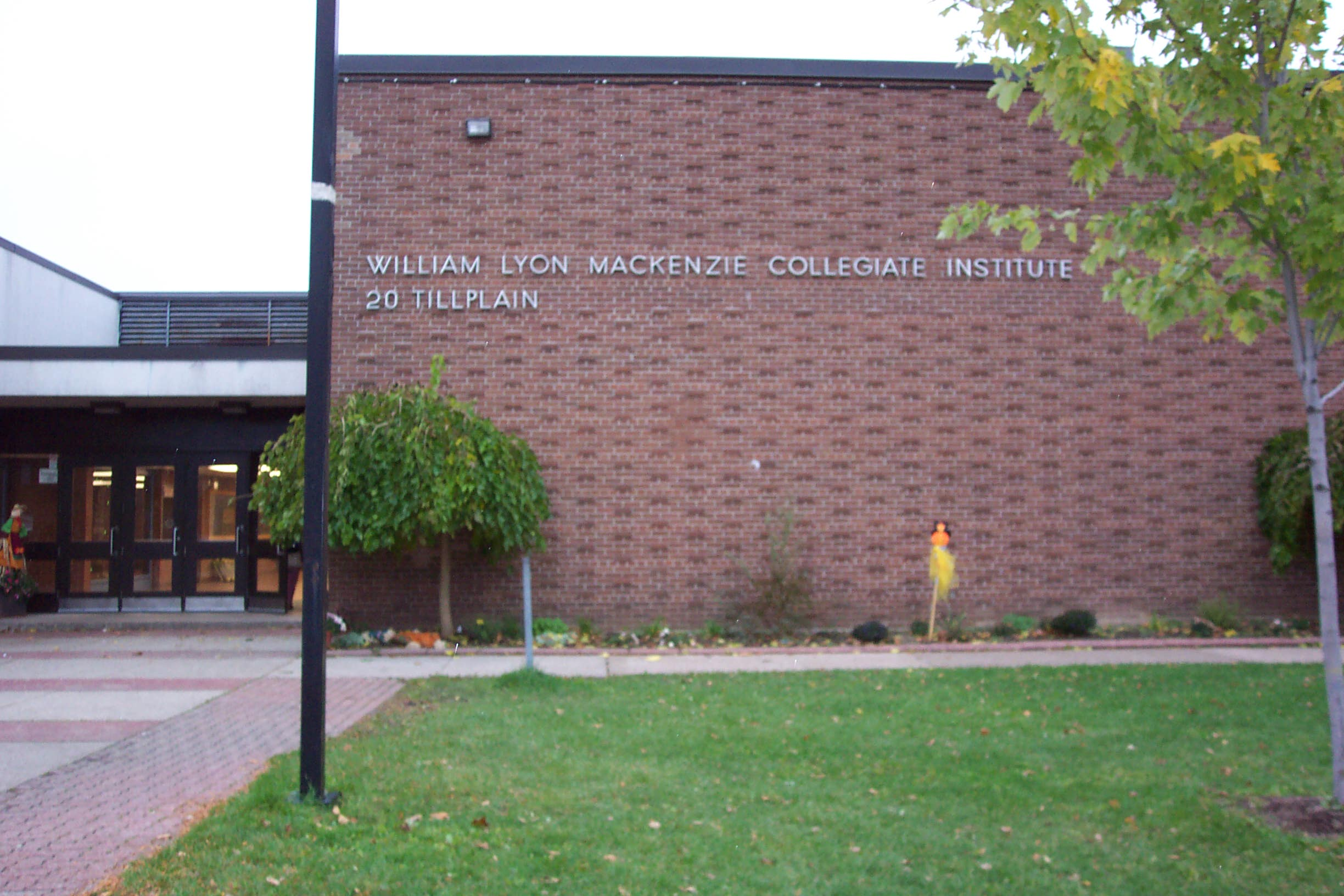
William Lyon Mackenzie Collegiate Institute is a public secondary school located in Bathurst Manor.

The Toronto District School Board (TDSB) is an English first language public secular school board that operates several schools in the neighbourhood.:

- Cedar Grove Public School opened in 1958 as a Kindergarten to Grade 8 school before the construction of Dufferin Heights. This school was renamed to Charles H. Best West Elementary School in 1978 operating from Kindergarten to Grade 5, before being separated in 2002 as a K-4 school and renamed to Wilmington Elementary School in 2004.
- Charles H. Best Junior Middle School was built in 1960 as Dufferin Heights Junior High School operating Grades 7 to 9. In 1978, this school became Charles H. Best East Middle School operating from Grades 6 to 8, before becoming its own school in 2002 as a grades 5-8 school and renamed to Charles H. Best Middle School in 2004 and again in 2018. In 2018, it changed again from grades 4-8.
- Wilmington Public School is located on 200 Wilmington Avenue and opened in 1954. This school was closed in 1978 and amalgamated with Cedar Grove and Dufferin Grove to form Charles H. Best. Community Hebrew Academy of Toronto, a private Jewish high school, moved to this building in 1979. The Wilmington name was reused for the old Cedar Grove building in 2004.
- William Lyon Mackenzie Collegiate Institute

Three other public school boards also provide schooling to applicable students in Bathurst Manor, the Conseil scolaire Viamonde (CSV), Conseil scolaire catholique MonAvenir (CSCM), and the Toronto Catholic District School Board (TCDSB). CSV is a French first language secular school board, whereas CSCM and TCDSB are public separate school boards, the former being a French first language school board, the latter being an English first language school board. Neither CSCM, CSV, and TCDSB operates a school in Bathurst Manor, with their students attending schools situated in other neighbourhoods in Toronto.

The public post-secondary institution, the University of Toronto, also operates the Institute for Aerospace Studies in the northern portions of the neighbourhood.

== Governance ==
Bathurst Manor is part of the Federal and Provincial riding of York Centre, represented by M.P. Roman Baber and M.P.P. Michael Kerzner, the former being a member of the Conservative Party of Canada and the latter being a member of the Progressive Conservative Party of Ontario. Municipally, the constituency is also known as Ward 6, which is represented by Councilor James Pasternak.

Bathurst Manor is located within 32 Division of the Toronto Police Service and is most often serviced by Station 143 of the Toronto Fire Services.

== Recreation ==
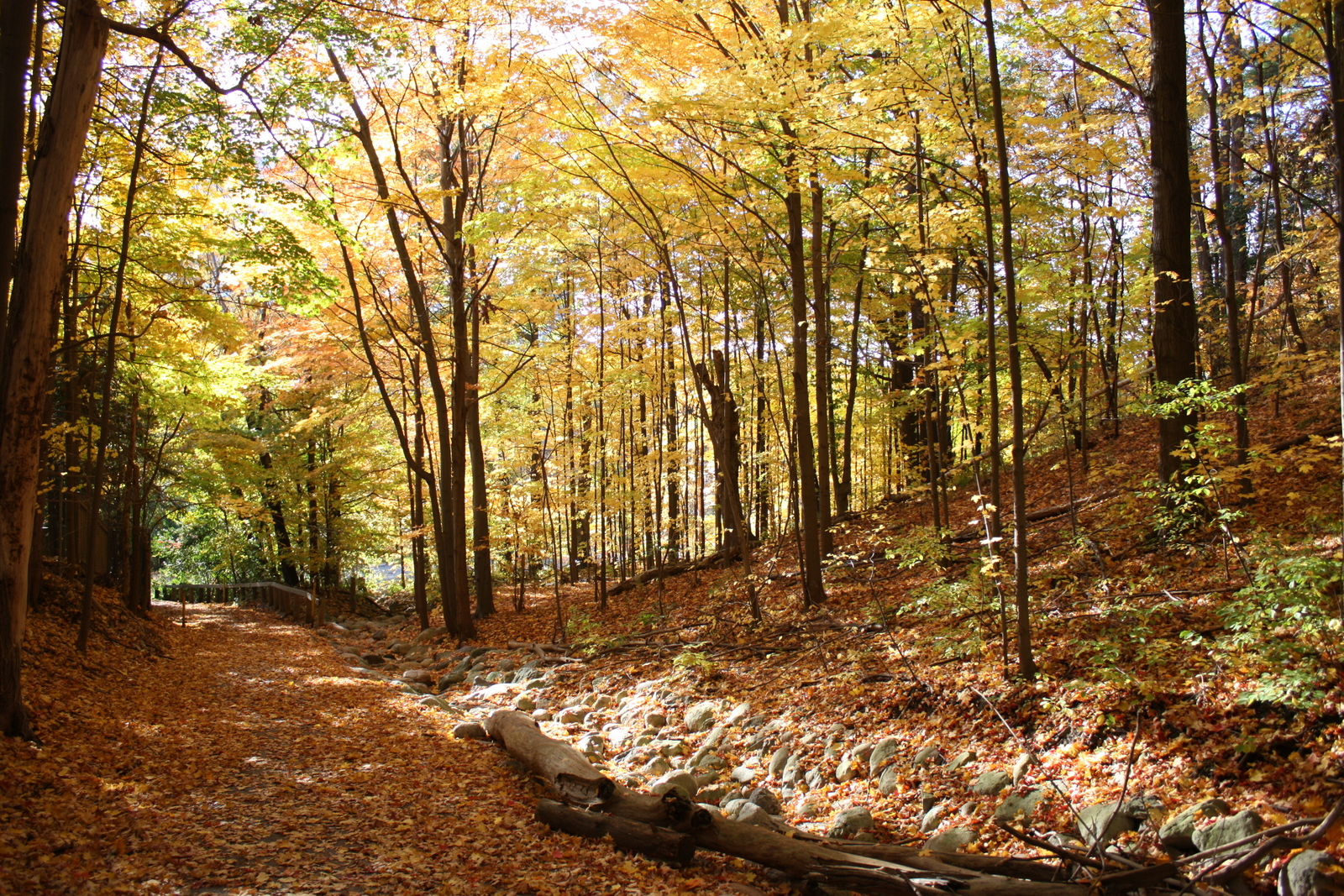
West Don Parkland is one of several municipal parks located around Bathurst Manor.

Several municipal parks are located in the Bathurst Manor including Garthdale Park, G. Ross Lord Park, Irving W. Chapley Park, and Maxwell Park, and the West Don Parklands. Municipal parks in Toronto are managed by the Toronto Parks, Forestry and Recreation Division. Several municipal parks in the neighbourhood are situated near the Don Valley, which forms a part of the Toronto ravine system.

The Toronto Parks, Forestry and Recreation Division also manages the Irving W. Chapley Community Centre (named after a local alderman) is located in Irving W. Chapley Park. This community centre features a tot's play area, meeting rooms and an outdoor pool and water play area. In addition to Irving W. Chaley Community Centre, the neighbourhood is also home to the Prosserman Jewish Community Centre (PJCC). PJCC is a multi purpose facility with cardiovascular conditioning equipment, indoor and outdoor pools, indoor and outdoor track, and tennis and basketball courts. This centre is also the home of the Leah Posluns Theatre and formerly the Koffler Gallery when the site was known as the Bathurst Jewish Community Centre.

Skiing was popular during the 1950s at a ski hill located adjacent to what is now Blue Forest Drive. In the summer of 1956, the valley below the ski hill was the site of Bathurst Manor Day Camp, later Forest Valley Day Camp, and now a part of the Forest Valley Outdoor Education Centre. At its peak, it was the largest privately owned summer day camp in Canada, with over 900 campers, and operated through 1993. In 1973 the grade ten students from Downsview Secondary School built a suspension bridge across the ravine as part of their workshop experience. The bridge was dismantled some years later when it was considered an insurance liability. Beginning in 1998, Camp NAORCA summer camp operated by Toronto Parks, Forestry and Recreation Division moved here from its previous location at Seneca College, King Campus, and the Toronto District School Board uses this space during the school year to educate 21,000 students per year.

=== Arts ===
Several works from the collection of the Koffler Centre of the Arts was housed at the BJCC's Koffler Gallery but now moved to their new home downtown at Artscape Youngplace. The centre also provided visual arts studios, music and dance schools, and the Leah Posluns Theatre which was then a 444-seat facility offering opera, theatre, dance, music and other cultural events. The Jewish Book Fair is held at the Centre annually.

Much of David Bezmozgis's 2004 short story collection Natasha and Other Stories takes place in the general vicinity of the Bathurst Manor in the late 1980s. In one story, "Roman Berman - Massage Therapist", the title character takes an office in the medical building at Bathurst Manor Plaza, which was torn down in 2017 and is slated for redevelopment into town homes. Bezmozgis's narrator refers to the plaza as "Sunnybrook Plaza", after its anchor store at the time. Author Stuart Ross, who grew up in Bathurst Manor, set most of his 2011 novel, Snowball, Dragonfly, Jew (ECW Press), in Bathurst Manor. The book centres on the fictional assassination of a neo-Nazi in Bathurst Manor Plaza. References are made to many streets in Bathurst Manor, as well as stores in the plaza.

=== Retail ===
The major strip mall, Sheppard Plaza, is located at the intersection of Sheppard Avenue and Bathurst Street.

There was also a smaller Bathurst Manor Plaza shopping centre at the intersection of Wilmington and Overbrook.

== Notable people ==
- Howie Mandel - comedian, actor, game show host
- Herbert L. Becker - author, magician, entertainer, TV producer
- Jeanne Beker - fashion industry broadcaster
- Alice Panikian - Miss Universe Canada 2006
- Michael Wex - author
- Yank Azman - actor
- Avery Saltzman - Canadian actor and theater director
- Martin Dobkin - first Mayor, City of Mississauga
- Mark S. Fox - Distinguished Professor, University of Toronto
