= Prosserman Jewish Community Centre =

Coordinates: 43.762884°N 79.44171°W

The Prosserman Jewish Community Centre is a Jewish Community Centre for the Toronto area. It is located along Bathurst Street in the Bathurst Manor neighborhood of Toronto.

== History ==
The Bathurst Jewish Community Centre has its origins in theYMHA (Young Men's Hebrew Association) founded in 1930 on Brunswick Street in downtown Toronto. In 1953 a new facility was built, the Bloor Street Y at Bloor Street and Spadina Avenue. It is still there today, but has been completely renovated and is now called the Miles Nadal Jewish Community Centre. In 1958, a new JCC campus was started to the north on Bathurst Street to meet demand from changing demographics in that corridor. The BJCC eventually contained a range of facilities and programs, including multiple athletic spaces, the Leah Posluns Theatre, Centre Camp, Kolel: The Adult Centre for Liberal Jewish Learning, the Family Resource Centre, and the Koffler Centre of the Arts.

In the late 2000s, the BJCC plans were made to replace the entire complex with new buildings, which is now the Prosserman JCC.

=== Koffler Centre of the Arts ===
Opened in 1977 inside the BJCC, the "Koffler Centre of the Arts" is a broad-based cultural institution that was established by Murray and Marvelle Koffler. The Koffler Centre teaches dance, music, and visual arts; presents exhibitions of cutting-edge contemporary Canadian art; and is home to the Helen and Stan Vine Canadian Jewish Book Awards, the Annual Jewish Book Fair, the Koffler Chamber Orchestra, and the Stars of the 21st Century Gala. It presents concerts, film screenings, poetry, spoken word, comedy, and discussions on world issues through the lens of culture.

=== Leah Posluns Theatre ===
The Leah Polsuns Theatre was founded in 1977 as a live performance venue at the then BJCC. The 444-seat theatre closed when the BJCC was being redeveloped in 2009 and reopened in 2020 at 300+ seats venue at the new Prosserman Jewish Community Centre. The theatre is named for Leah Polsuns (1901–1971), wife of Toronto businessman and philanthropist Louis Polsuns.

=== Centre Camp ===
The Camp (The Jack and Pat Kay Centre Camp) located in North York, Toronto, provides outdoor activities for children from 3 to 15 years with a connection to the Jewish community since 1990s.

=== Lipa Green Centre for Jewish Community Services ===
While not part of the JCC itself, the Lipa Green Centre for Jewish Community Services had a building on the same property as the BJCC. When the BJCC was redeveloped, plans called for the Lipa Green Centre, which had just undergone a major renovation, to connect various bridges and atriums to the main JCC complex.

=== Sherman Campus/Prosserman JCC ===
In 2007, the UJA of Greater Toronto announced plans to demolish the BJCC and build a newer, more advanced, larger complex on the same site. The name given to the lot and all of the proposed buildings therein was the "Sherman Campus".

In 2009, the BJCC was demolished and, in its place, construction began on the Prosserman Jewish Community Centre. The new JCC was named after businessman and philanthropist Martin Prosserman (1931–2019), who gifted $12 million towards its construction. The first phase, the Donald Gales Family Pavilion, was completed in 2010 and included a health and fitness centre, arts and cultural programming, and an early childhood education centre.

Construction of the second phase began in October 2017. The expanded Prosserman JCC officially opened in autumn 2021, following delays associated with the COVID-19 pandemic. The expansion included the 105,000-square-foot Sheff Family Building, housing the Cynamon/Sokolowski Sports Complex, the David and Esther Freiman Early Childhood Education Centre, and the reopened Leah Posluns Theatre, with seating for more than 300 people. The sports complex includes a gymnasium, fitness studios, an indoor running track, indoor and outdoor saltwater swimming pools, outdoor sports courts, saunas and steam rooms.

The expanded centre resumed year-round programming in 2022, including summer camps, supplementary Hebrew education and swimming lessons. The Prosserman JCC occupies the Sheff Family Building and Donald Gales Family Pavilion on the 27-acre Sherman Campus.
