= North York (electoral district) =

Federal electoral district in Ontario, Canada

Coordinates: 43.7627°N 79.4456°W

Ontario electoral district
- Interactive map of riding boundaries from the 2015 federal election

Federal electoral district
- Legislature: House of Commons
MP
Roman Baber
Conservative
- District created: 1952
- First contested: 1953
- Last contested: 2025
- District webpage: profile, map

Demographics
- Population (2021): 108,307
- Electors (2015): 63,682
- Area (km²): 37
- Pop. density (per km²): 2,927.2
- Census division: Toronto
- Census subdivision: Toronto (part)

North York, previously York Centre (French: York-Centre), is a federal electoral district in Ontario, Canada, that has been represented in the House of Commons of Canada from 1904 to 1917 and since 1953. It is currently represented by Conservative MP Roman Baber.

The electoral district was previously considered one of the safest Liberal Party seats in Canada, represented by prominent Liberal MPs with national significance such as Toronto's longest serving mayor Art Eggleton and the hockey legend Ken Dryden. However, this changed as the Conservative Party gained ground in the 2000s. The Conservative Party captured it in 2011 and were competitive in the three subsequent elections. It regained the seat in the 2025 election.

== Demographics ==
As per the 2016 Census, 17.0% of York Centre residents are of Filipino ethnic origin, which is the highest figure among all city of Toronto ridings. At the same time, the York Centre riding has the highest percentage of residents of Russian (9.5%) and Jewish (5.6%) ethnic origins (in the 2011 National Household Survey, 13.6% of York Centre residents had entered a Jewish ethnic origin). The riding has a large Jewish population, currently the fourth-largest in Canada at 14 percent behind Thornhill, Mount Royal and Eglinton—Lawrence.

According to the 2021 Canadian census

Ethnic groups: 46.9% White, 19.3% Filipino, 8.0% Black, 5.4% Latin American, 4.1% South Asian, 3.7% Southeast Asian, 3.3% Chinese, 2.5% West Asian, 1.6% Korean
Languages: 42.0% English, 9.5% Tagalog, 6.3% Russian, 5.2% Italian, 5.1% Spanish, 2.1% Vietnamese, 1.6% Portuguese, 1.5% Ilocano, 1.4% Korean, 1.3% Mandarin, 1.1% Cantonese, 1.1% Turkish, 1.1% Persian
Religions: 57.3% Christian (36.0% Catholic, 4.4% Christian Orthodox, 1.7% Pentecostal, 15.2% other), 14.3% Jewish, 5.0% Muslim, 2.5% Buddhist, 2.1% Hindu, 18.3% none
Median income: $36,400 (2020)
Average income: $50,440 (2020)

== Geography ==
North York consists of the part of the City of Toronto bounded on the north by the northern city limit, and on the east, south and west by a line drawn from the city limit south along Bathurst Street, southeast along the Don River West Branch, southwest and west along Highway 401, north along Jane Street, east along Sheppard Avenue West, northwest along Black Creek, east along Grandravine Drive, and north along Keele Street to the city limit.

It contains the neighbourhoods of Westminster–Branson, Bathurst Manor, Wilson Heights, Downsview, and York University Heights (a small section south of Grandravine Drive, east of Black Creek).

At the approximate centre of the district is Downsview Park, an urban park controlled by the federal government, on former grounds of Canadian Forces Base Toronto.

== History ==
=== Geographical evolution ===
York Centre was originally created in 1903 from parts of York East and York West ridings. It was created when the county of York (excluding the city of Toronto) was divided into three ridings: York Centre, York North and York South. The centre riding consisted of the townships of Etobicoke, Markham, Scarborough and Vaughan, and the villages of Markham, Richmond Hill, Weston and Woodbridge. The electoral district was abolished in 1914 when it was redistributed between York East, York South and York West. In 1952, York Centre was re-established with parts of the York North riding.

The new riding consisted initially of the part of the township of North York west of Yonge Street, the part of the township of Vaughan south of Highway Number 7, and the town of Woodbridge.

In 1966, it was redefined to consist of the part of Metropolitan Toronto bounded on the north by the northern limit, and on the west, south and east by a line drawn from that borough limit south along Highway 400, east along Sheppard Avenue West, south along Jane Street, southeast along Exbury Road, east along Calvington Drive, south along Keele Street, east along Highway 401, south along the Canadian National Railway line, east along Lawrence Avenue West, north along the Spadina Expressway, northeast along Highway 401, north along Bathurst Street, east along Sheppard Avenue West, south along Easton Street, east along Cameron Avenue, and north along Yonge Street to the Metro Toronto limit. It is unclear why the name York Centre was retained as the district was now predominantly in the Borough of North York rather than in the Region of York.

In 1976, it was redefined to consist of the part of the Borough of North York bounded on the north by the borough limit, and on the west, south and east by a line drawn from the borough limit south along Highway 400, east along Sheppard Avenue West, south along Keele Street, east along Highway 401, north along Bathurst Street, and northwest along the West Branch of the Don River to the borough limit, hence giving the parts of the original riding that is south of Highway 401 to the newly-created riding of Eglinton—Lawrence.

In 1987, it was redefined to consist of the part of the City of North York bounded on the north by the city limit, and on the east, south and west by a line drawn from the city limit southeast along the Don River West Branch, west along Highway 401, north along Jane Street, east along Grandravine Drive, and north along Black Creek to the northern city limit.

In 1996, it was redefined to consist of the part of the City of North York bounded on the north by the city limit, and on the east, south and west by a line drawn from the city limit south along Dufferin Street, west along Sheppard Avenue West, north along Keele Street, west along Grandravine Drive, south along Jane Street, east along Highway 401, northwest along the Don River West Branch, north along Bathurst Street, east along Drewry Avenue, north along Chelmsford Avenue, west along Greenwin Village Road, and north along Village Gate to the city limit.

In 2003, it was given its current boundaries as described above.

This riding lost territory to Willowdale during the 2012 electoral redistribution.

The riding did not undergo any boundary changes following the 2022 Canadian federal electoral redistribution.

The riding's name changed to North York in 2026 as part of Bill C-25 of the 45th Canadian Parliament.

==== Former boundaries ====
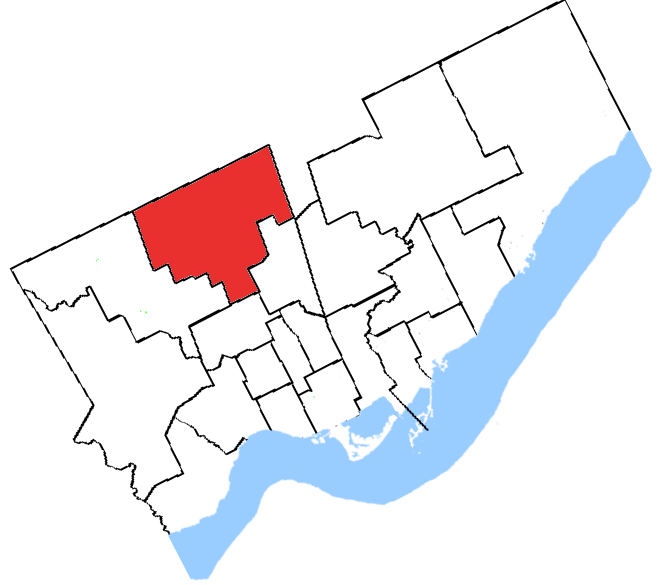
1966 to 1976

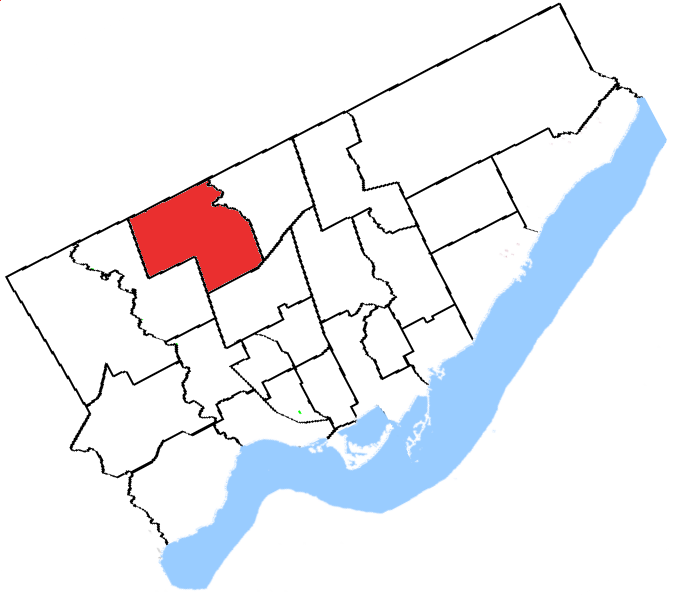
1976 to 1987

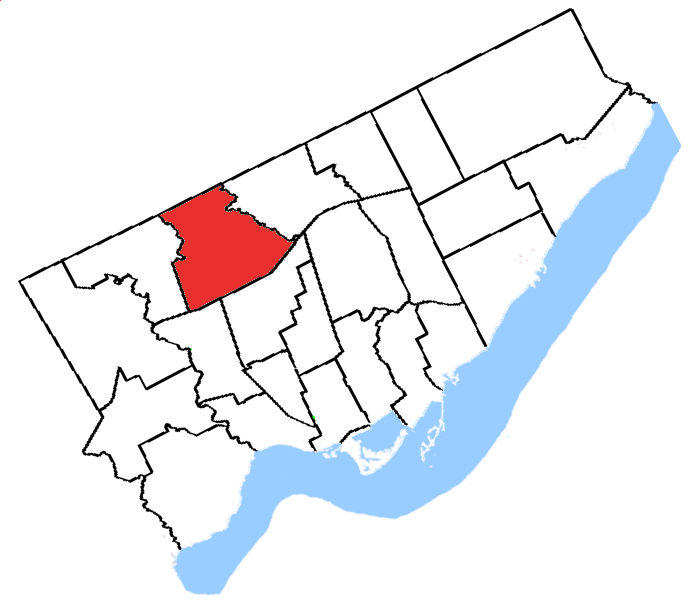
1987 to 1996

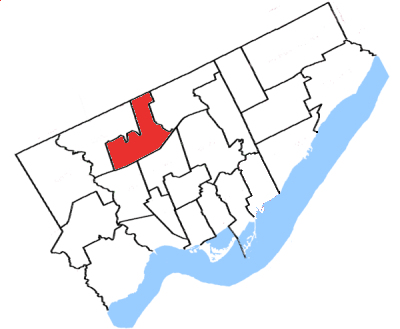
1996 to 2003

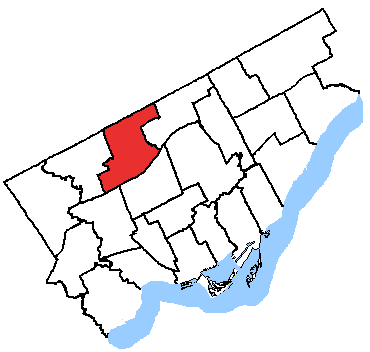
2003 to 2015

=== Political history ===
==== First incarnation, 1904–1917 ====
Liberal Archibald Campbell, incumbent MP for York West when the electoral district of York Centre was created, won the first York Centre contest by a margin of 76 votes (out of over 4,000), foreshadowing its future as a swing riding. A veteran of competitive contests, Campbell was first elected in 1887 as MP for Kent in southwestern Ontario by a margin just over 100, an election that was overturned, and was elected in the subsequent by-election with an even smaller margin. He moved to Toronto and sought re-election in York West in 1900, unsuccessfully challenging the six-term MP and former Controller of Customs Nathaniel Clarke Wallace. Campbell was elected MP for York West following Wallace's death, defeating Wallace's son Thomas George Wallace in a by-election, and continued to serve as MP for York Centre after redistricting until he was summoned to the Senate in 1907.

Peter Douglas McLean held the seat briefly, fending off the younger Wallace's second attempt at recapturing his father's seat by an even smaller margin of 26 voters in a by-election. The younger Wallace was finally successful on his third try, defeating McLean with a 45 vote margin (out of over 5,000), and continue to serve when the district was reconstitute as York West. Like his father, Thomas Wallace died while in office, in 1921 at age 41.

==== Recreation as suburban district ====
In the first election of the reconstituted York Centre in 1953, Liberal candidate Al Hollingworth defeated Roy Thomson, the founder of Canada's wealthiest family and the future 1st Baron Thomson of Fleet, who stood as a Progressive Conservative in his only bid for electoral office. Hollingworth was defeated after one term by Progressive Conservative candidate Fred C. Stinson, the then 34-year old chair of North York's board of education. Stinson was in turn defeated after two terms by James Edgar Walker, who went on to serve five terms, during which he served as Chief Government Whip and Parliamentary Secretary to the Prime Minister.

==== Launch pad for star candidates ====
Four of the five Liberals who represented York Centre in the last half century since Walker - Bob Kaplan, Art Eggleton, Ken Dryden, Ya'ara Saks - served in the cabinet (respectively in the Ministries of Trudeau Sr & Turner, Chretien, Martin, Trudeau Jr). Three of them - Eggleton, Dryden and Saks - were named candidates by the leader without facing competitive nomination contests, while Kaplan secured his return to parliament here after having been defeated in Don Valley.

==== A flank in the Liberal North York bastion ====
From the 1970s to 1990s, York Centre along with neighbouring York West (now Humber River—Black Creek), York South—Weston and Eglinton—Lawrence were considered among the safest Liberal Party seats in Canada. These electoral districts, located in the western half of the former borough of North York, withheld the Progressive Conservative 1984 landslide and 1988 re-election under Brian Mulroney thanks in no small part to their sizable and fast-growing Jewish Canadian and Italian Canadian communities. York Centre in particular had the highest percentage of Jewish population among Toronto ridings. For much of the second half of the 20th century, these two communities were reliable support base for the Liberals, routinely delivering solid margin for the Liberals both federally and provincially.

The creation of the York Centre provincial electoral district (with identical boundary) in 1999 combined the districts of two Liberal incumbents, the Jewish former minister Monte Kwinter and the Italian former leadership candidate Annamarie Castrilli, triggering one of Ontario Liberal Party's most heavily contested and acrimonious contest nomination for the newly created safe liberal seat.

However, the political leaning of the Jewish Canadian shifted rapidly away from the Liberals and toward the Conservatives in the early 21st century, making York Centre a prime target for Conservative gains. When the Liberal Party suffered its worst defeat in history in 2011, York Centre was among the 16 Toronto seats (out of 22) it lost, despite incumbent MP Ken Dryden, the hockey legend and a former cabinet minister, campaigning exclusively in the riding (he was one of the biggest draw stumping for other candidates in the two previous elections) and hosting the Liberals' final campaign rally, featuring former Prime Minister Jean Chrétien, in the riding.

The Liberals again swept Toronto in the 2015 election and regained York Centre with Michael Levitt. However, Levitt's victory margin of less than 3% was among the tightest for the Liberals in the city. Saks succeed Levitt in 2020 through a by-election

==== A breach in the Liberal Toronto fortress ====
In the 2025 election that returned the Liberal to power with a minority mandate, Conservative Roman Baber, who represented the district as a Progressive Conservative MPP from 2018 to 2022, secured the only Conservative victory within Toronto city boundary. Baber's election in York Centre is politically significant in the following ways:

- Baber is the first candidate not carrying a Liberal banner elected in Toronto during a general election since the 2011 election (when the Liberal Party suffered its worst defeat in its history, losing most of its Toronto seats including 8 to the Conservatives).
- With the exception of the 8 Conservatives elected in 2011, Baber is the first Conservative MP elected during a general election since the 1988 election.
- In 9 of the past 10 general elections (since 1993 with the exception of 2011), Toronto delivered close to clean sweeps of its approximately 20 seats to the Liberal Party. Baber followed independent MP John Nunziata (who won re-election in 1997 after being expelled from Liberal caucus), former NDP leader Jack Layton (first elected 2004), his spouse and current mayor Olivia Chow and former NDP leadership contender Peggy Nash (both first elected 2006) as the fifth Toronto MP to have successful breached such Liberal sweeps.

== Members of Parliament ==
This riding has elected the following members of Parliament:

Parliament	Years	Member	Party
York Centre; Riding created from York East and York West
10th	1904–1907	Archibald Campbell	Liberal
10th	1907–1908	Peter Douglas McLean	Liberal
11th	1908–1911	Thomas George Wallace	Conservative
12th	1911–1917	Thomas George Wallace	Conservative
Riding dissolved into York East, York South, and York West
Riding re-created from York North
22nd	1953–1957	Al Hollingworth	Liberal
23rd	1957–1958	Fred C. Stinson	Progressive Conservative
24th	1958–1962	Fred C. Stinson	Progressive Conservative
25th	1962–1963	James Edgar Walker	Liberal
26th	1963–1965	James Edgar Walker	Liberal
27th	1965–1968	James Edgar Walker	Liberal
28th	1968–1972	James Edgar Walker	Liberal
29th	1972–1974	James Edgar Walker	Liberal
30th	1974–1979	Bob Kaplan	Liberal
31st	1979–1980	Bob Kaplan	Liberal
32nd	1980–1984	Bob Kaplan	Liberal
33rd	1984–1988	Bob Kaplan	Liberal
34th	1988–1993	Bob Kaplan	Liberal
35th	1993–1997	Art Eggleton	Liberal
36th	1997–2000	Art Eggleton	Liberal
37th	2000–2004	Art Eggleton	Liberal
38th	2004–2006	Ken Dryden	Liberal
39th	2006–2008	Ken Dryden	Liberal
40th	2008–2011	Ken Dryden	Liberal
41st	2011–2015	Mark Adler	Conservative
42nd	2015–2019	Michael Levitt	Liberal
43rd	2019–2020	Michael Levitt	Liberal
43rd	2020–2021	Ya'ara Saks	Liberal
44th	2021–2025	Ya'ara Saks	Liberal
45th	2025–2026	Roman Baber	Conservative
North York
45th	2026–present	Roman Baber	Conservative

== Election results ==
Graph of election results in York Centre (1953–, minor parties that never got 2% of the vote or didn't run consistently are omitted) View source data.

=== 2020–present ===
2025 Canadian federal election: York Centre
** Preliminary results — Not yet official **
Party	Candidate	Votes	%	±%	Expenditures
Conservative	Roman Baber	26,082	54.82	+16.97	
Liberal	Ya'ara Saks	20,303	42.68	–4.61	
New Democratic	Yusuf Ulukanligil	1,189	2.50	–7.68	
Total valid votes/expense limit					
Total rejected ballots					
Turnout		47,574	63.63		
Eligible voters		74,764			
Conservative gain from Liberal		Swing		+10.79	
Source: Elections Canada

2021 Canadian federal election: York Centre
Party	Candidate	Votes	%	±%	Expenditures
Liberal	Ya'ara Saks	17,430	47.3	+1.6	$106,060.49
Conservative	Joel Yakov Etienne	13,949	37.8	-4.0	$98,838.17
New Democratic	Kemal Ahmed	3,753	10.2	+4.4	$5,586.43
People's	Nixon Nguyen	1,726	4.7	+1.1	$1,816.68
Total valid votes/expense limit		36,858	98.6	–	$106,565.66
Total rejected ballots		507	1.4		
Turnout		37,365	53.4		
Eligible voters		69,971			
Liberal hold		Swing		+2.8	
Source: Elections Canada

Canadian federal by-election, October 26, 2020: York Centre Resignation of Michael Levitt
Party	Candidate	Votes	%	±%	Expenditures
Liberal	Ya'ara Saks	8,253	45.70	−4.50	$96,612.31
Conservative	Julius Tiangson	7,552	41.82	+5.11	
New Democratic	Andrea Vásquez Jiménez	1,046	5.79	−4.05	$2,462.86
People's	Maxime Bernier	642	3.56	–	$27,917.42
Green	Sasha Zavarella	461	2.55	−0.70	$463.46
Independent	John "The Engineer" Turmel	104	0.58	–	—
Total valid votes/expense limit		18,058	100.00	–	$105,734.74
Total rejected ballots		166	0.91	−0.61	
Turnout		18,224	25.64	−36.12	
Eligible voters		70,434			
Liberal hold		Swing		−4.81	
Source:Elections Canada

=== 1953–2019 ===
2019 Canadian federal election: York Centre
Party	Candidate	Votes	%	±%	Expenditures
Liberal	Michael Levitt	21,680	50.20	+3.32	$93,151.84
Conservative	Rachel Willson	15,852	36.71	−7.29	$89,344.00
New Democratic	Andrea Vásquez Jiménez	4,251	9.84	+2.51	none listed
Green	Rebecca Wood	1,403	3.25	+1.45	$0.00
Total valid votes/expense limit		43,186	98.48		
Total rejected ballots		665	1.52	+0.78	
Turnout		43,851	61.76	-3.96	
Eligible voters		71,000			
Liberal hold		Swing		+5.31	
Source: Elections Canada

2015 Canadian federal election
Party	Candidate	Votes	%	±%	Expenditures
Liberal	Michael Levitt	20,131	46.88	+13.64	$108,171.17
Conservative	Mark Adler	18,893	43.99	−4.54	$139,711.85
New Democratic	Hal Berman	3,148	7.33	−8.56	$9,236.24
Green	Constantine Kritsonis	772	1.80	−0.54	$2,969.38
Total valid votes/expense limit		42,944	99.26		$198,977.91
Total rejected ballots		319	0.74	–	
Turnout		43,263	65.72	–	
Eligible voters		65,832			
Liberal gain from Conservative		Swing		+9.09	
Source: Elections Canada

2011 federal election redistributed results
Party	Vote	%
Conservative	17,249	48.53
Liberal	11,814	33.24
New Democratic	5,649	15.89
Green	831	2.34

2011 Canadian federal election
Party	Candidate	Votes	%	±%	Expenditures
Conservative	Mark Adler	20,356	48.5	+10.5	$79,794.56
Liberal	Ken Dryden	13,979	33.3	−10.2	$73,675.98
New Democratic	Nick Brownlee	6,656	15.9	+3.8	$409.63
Green	Rosemary Frei	979	2.3	−4.1	$342.41
Total valid votes/expense limit		41,970	100.0	$83,892.08	
Total rejected ballots		350	0.1	–	
Turnout		42,320	60.3	+7.6	
Eligible voters		70,216	–	–	
Conservative gain from Liberal		Swing		+10.35	

2008 Canadian federal election
Party	Candidate	Votes	%	±%	Expenditures
Liberal	Ken Dryden	16,164	43.5	−9.2	$70,386
Conservative	Rochelle Wilner	14,132	38.0	+7.9	$78,946
New Democratic	Kurtis Baily	4,503	12.1	−1.7	
Green	Rosemary Frei	2,390	6.4	+3.8	$3,440
Total valid votes/expense limit		37,189	100.0	$81,864	
Total rejected ballots		–			
Turnout		–	52.7		

2006 Canadian federal election
Party	Candidate	Votes	%	±%	Expenditures
Liberal	Ken Dryden	22,439	52.7	−2.1	$74,395.87
Conservative	Michael Mostyn	12,758	30.0	+3.7	$69,571.51
New Democratic	Marco Iacampo	5,834	13.7	0	$13,721.44
Green	Constantine Kritsonis	1,558	3.7	+0.5	$1,644.87
Total valid votes		42,589			

2004 Canadian federal election
Party	Candidate	Votes	%	±%	Expenditures
Liberal	Ken Dryden	21,520	54.8	−16.3	$64,620
Conservative	Michael Mostyn	10,318	26.3	+5.8	$72,837
New Democratic	Peter Flaherty	5,376	13.7	+7.7	$10,017
Green	Constantine Kritsonis	1,240	3.2	+1.7	
Independent	Max Royz	824	2.1	–	$23,589
Total valid votes		39,278			

2000 Canadian federal election
Party	Candidate	Votes	%	±%	Expenditures
Liberal	Art Eggleton	24,793	71.1	−1.0	$56,516
Alliance	Jeffrey Dorfman	4,630	13.3	–	$19,703
Progressive Conservative	Mark Tweyman	2,518	7.2	−1.4	$1,280
New Democratic	Maurice Coulter	2,104	6.0	−3.4	$8,831
Green	Constantine Kritsonis	532	1.5	+0.5	$2,401
Communist	Christopher Black	163	0.5	–	$202
Marxist–Leninist	Diane Johnston	142	0.4	0	$8
Total valid votes		34,882			

1997 Canadian federal election
Party	Candidate	Votes	%	±%
Liberal	Art Eggleton	27,864	72.1	+2.4
New Democratic	Mark Berardo	3,618	9.4	+5.4
Progressive Conservative	Anthony Figliano	3,323	8.6	+1.7
Reform	Anthony Chol	2,876	7.4	+1.9
Green	Constantine Kritsonis	389	1.0	+0.4
Natural Law	Mike Dubinsky	242	0.6	0
Canadian Action	Jozef Izsak	186	0.5	–
Marxist–Leninist	Diane Johnston	168	0.4	+0.2
Total valid votes		38,666		

1993 Canadian federal election
Party	Candidate	Votes	%	±%
Liberal	Art Eggleton	27,150	69.7	+9.2
Independent	Peter Li Preti	3,918	10.1	–
Progressive Conservative	George Tsiolis	2,688	6.9	−15.5
Reform	John Beck	2,141	5.5	–
New Democratic	Israel Ellis	1,557	4.0	−11.4
National	Kurt Loeb	734	1.9	–
Natural Law	Linda Dubé	253	0.6	–
Green	Alan Jones	216	0.6	–
Libertarian	Douglas Quinn	174	0.4	−1.3
Marxist–Leninist	Diane Johnston	83	0.2	–
Abolitionist	Randy Armour	60	0.2	–
Total valid votes		38,974		

1988 Canadian federal election
Party	Candidate	Votes	%	±%
Liberal	Bob Kaplan	24,962	60.5	+9.3
Progressive Conservative	Rocco Sebastiano	9,248	22.4	−5.0
New Democratic	Cathy Mele	6,350	15.4	−4.4
Libertarian	David Kenny	683	1.7	+1.1
Total valid votes		41,243		

1984 Canadian federal election
Party	Candidate	Votes	%	±%
Liberal	Bob Kaplan	20,810	51.2	-9.8
Progressive Conservative	Mike Cohen	11,138	27.4	+9.6
New Democratic	Van Newell	8,037	19.8	−0.5
Libertarian	Simon Srdarev	244	0.6	−0.1
Independent	Sol Roter	226	0.6	–
Independent	Bonnie J. Geddes	203	0.5	–
Total valid votes		40,658		

1980 Canadian federal election
Party	Candidate	Votes	%	±%
Liberal	Bob Kaplan	23,116	61.0	+9.7
New Democratic	Cris Liscio	7,696	20.3	−5.4
Progressive Conservative	Anne Silverman	6,736	17.8	−4.0
Libertarian	Sheldon Gold	284	0.7	+0.1
Marxist–Leninist	Jeffery Forest	86	0.2	0
Total valid votes		37,918		

1979 Canadian federal election
Party	Candidate	Votes	%	±%
Liberal	Bob Kaplan	20,859	51.3	+0.6
New Democratic	Vince Del Buono	10,464	25.7	+2.2
Progressive Conservative	Bill Schiavono	8,856	21.8	−3.1
Libertarian	Shannon Vale	229	0.6	–
Independent	Victor Heyn	97	0.2	–
Marxist–Leninist	Jeffery Forest	81	0.2	0
Communist	Gerrit van Houten	63	0.2	0
Total valid votes		40,649		

1974 Canadian federal election
Party	Candidate	Votes	%	±%
Liberal	Bob Kaplan	32,402	50.7	+8.8
Progressive Conservative	Barry Swadron	15,877	24.9	−4.9
New Democratic	Michael Copeland	14,992	23.5	−4.3
Independent	John J. de Niet	191	0.3	–
Social Credit	Roger Drouin	169	0.3	–
Marxist–Leninist	Rick Hundal	129	0.2	–
Communist	Tom Morris	123	0.2	–
Total valid votes		63,883		

1972 Canadian federal election
Party	Candidate	Votes	%	±%
Liberal	James E. Walker	26,912	41.9	−14.7
Progressive Conservative	Barry Swadron	19,097	29.8	+17.5
New Democratic	Michael Copeland	17,837	27.8	-3.3
Independent	Harold Sparks	189	0.3	–
Independent	George Paxton	153	0.2	–
Total valid votes		64,188		

1968 Canadian federal election
Party	Candidate	Votes	%	±%
Liberal	James E. Walker	26,758	56.6	+10.2
New Democratic	Douglas Fisher	14,714	31.1	−5.0
Progressive Conservative	Donald Stirling	5,804	12.3	−4.8
Total valid votes		47,276		

1965 Canadian federal election
Party	Candidate	Votes	%	±%
Liberal	James E. Walker	41,553	46.4	−3.7
New Democratic	Val Scott	32,352	36.1	+1.7
Progressive Conservative	Fred C. Stinson	15,301	17.1	+1.6
Independent	Malcolm Cairnduff	302	0.3	–
Total valid votes		89,508		

1963 Canadian federal election
Party	Candidate	Votes	%	±%
Liberal	James E. Walker	41,485	50.1	+12.0
New Democratic	Val Scott	28,505	34.4	+0.1
Progressive Conservative	Bill Durovic	12,807	15.5	−11.2
Total valid votes		82,797		

1962 Canadian federal election
Party	Candidate	Votes	%	±%
Liberal	James E. Walker	30,432	38.1	+5.1
New Democratic	Val Scott	27,369	34.3	+20.6
Progressive Conservative	Fred C. Stinson	21,343	26.7	−26.6
Social Credit	David H. Horwood	746	0.9	–
Total valid votes		79,890		

1958 Canadian federal election
Party	Candidate	Votes	%	±%
Progressive Conservative	Fred C. Stinson	30,764	53.3	+5.9
Liberal	Al Hollingworth	19,065	33.0	−1.4
Co-operative Commonwealth	Larry Sheffe	7,888	13.7	−2.9
Total valid votes		57,717		

1957 Canadian federal election
Party	Candidate	Votes	%	±%
Progressive Conservative	Fred C. Stinson	23,295	47.4	+11.9
Liberal	Al Hollingworth	16,925	34.4	−9.7
Co-operative Commonwealth	Roy Begley	8,164	16.6	−2.3
Social Credit	Rod Gorrill	777	1.6	–
Total valid votes		49,161		

1953 Canadian federal election
Party	Candidate	Votes	%	±%
Liberal	Al Hollingworth	13,903	44.1	–
Progressive Conservative	Roy Thomson	11,180	35.5	–
Co-operative Commonwealth	William Newcombe	5,960	18.9	–
Labor–Progressive	David Kashtan	483	1.5	–
Total valid votes		31,526		

=== 1904–1917 ===
Graph of election results in York Centre (1903–1914, minor parties that never got 2% of the vote or didn't run consistently are omitted) View source data.

1911 Canadian federal election
Party	Candidate	Votes	%	±%
Conservative	Thomas George Wallace	2,838	54.9	+4.5
Liberal	Herbert Hartly Dewart	2,328	45.1	-4.5
Total valid votes		5,166	100.0	

1908 Canadian federal election
Party	Candidate	Votes	%	±%
Conservative	Thomas George Wallace	2,614	50.4	+0.7
Liberal	Peter Douglas McLean	2,569	49.6	-0.7
Total valid votes		5,183	100.0	

Canadian federal by-election, 23 December 1907
Party	Candidate	Votes	%	±%
On Mr. Campbell being called to the Senate, 22 November 1907
Liberal	Peter Douglas McLean	2,282	50.3	-0.6
Conservative	T.G. Wallace	2,256	49.7	+0.6
Total valid votes		4,538	100.0	

1904 Canadian federal election
Party	Candidate	Votes	%
Liberal	Archibald Campbell	2,222	50.9
Conservative	W.H. Pugsley	2,146	49.1
Total valid votes		4,368	100.0

== See also ==
- List of Canadian electoral districts
- Historical federal electoral districts of Canada

== Notes ==
- "North York (electoral district) (Code 35103) Census Profile". 2011 census. Government of Canada - Statistics Canada.
