= Fred C. Stinson =

Canadian politician (1922–2007)

Frederick (Fred) Coles Stinson

Member of the Canadian Parliament for York Centre
- In office 1957–1962
- Preceded by: Al Hollingworth
- Succeeded by: James Edgar Walker

Personal details
- Born: 28 December 1922 Toronto, Ontario
- Died: 17 June 2007 (aged 84) Toronto, Ontario
- Party: Progressive Conservative

Frederick (Fred) Coles Stinson (28 December 1922 – 17 June 2007) was a Canadian lawyer, politician, and diplomat, and the Member of Parliament for the federal riding of York Centre from 1957 to 1962.

== Early life and education ==
Born in Toronto, Ontario, Stinson graduated from Trinity University in Toronto before joining the Royal Canadian Navy in 1940, serving on convoy duty. He returned to Canada after the war and graduated from law school, articling at the firm of Parkinson Gardiner, where he met his future political mentor, Fred Gardiner, the future chairman of Metropolitan Toronto.

== Career ==
Stinson became a school trustee in the early 1950s and soon afterwards was appointed chairman of the North York board of education. In the 1957 federal election, at the age of 34, he ran for federal office in the riding of York Centre for the Progressive Conservative Party, defeating the incumbent, Al Hollingworth, by over 10,000 votes. He was re-elected in the 1958 federal election, but his lack of support for Prime Minister John Diefenbaker in the 1956 Tory leadership convention meant that he had little support from party leadership. In addition, the scuttling of the Avro Arrow project and the closure of the plant near his riding made him unpopular in his riding; he blamed the Arrow decision for his loss in the 1962 federal election to James Edgar Walker, a Liberal.

During his time as a Member of Parliament, Stinson visited Mainland China, being the first sitting Canadian member of parliament to do so, and attended the United Nations as part of the Canadian delegation, witnessing Nikita Khrushchev's interruption of Harold Macmillan's speech. He later founded Canadian University Service Overseas and was honorary consul for Upper Volta (now Burkina Faso).

After his parliamentary career ended, Stinson criticized the Diefenbaker government for what he felt was its anti-American stance. He returned to private practise in Toronto and was one of the organizers of the Churchill Society for the Advancement of Parliamentary Democracy.

== Death ==
Frederick Coles Stinson died in Toronto on 17 June 2007.
