= Miles Nadal Jewish Community Centre =

Jewish community centre in Toronto, Canada

- Abbreviation: MNJCC
- Formation: 1953
- Type: Jewish community centre
- Legal status: Nonprofit organization
- Location: 750 Spadina Avenue, Toronto, Ontario, Canada
- Website: www.mnjcc.org
- Formerly called: Young Men's and Young Women's Hebrew Association; Bloor Jewish Community Centre

The Miles Nadal Jewish Community Centre (MNJCC) is a Jewish cultural, educational and recreational centre located at 750 Spadina Avenue, at the intersection of Bloor Street and Spadina Avenue in the Annex neighbourhood of Toronto, Ontario, Canada. Established in 1953 as a Young Men's and Young Women's Hebrew Association (YM–YWHA) facility, it was subsequently known as the Bloor Jewish Community Centre or Bloor Y. The centre offers recreational, educational and cultural programming rooted in Jewish traditions, while serving the broader community.

== History ==
The Toronto YMHA (Young Men's Hebrew Association) was founded in 1930. Its origins can be traced to Jewish athletic and social clubs established in Toronto during the early 20th century. In 1919, several of these organizations joined to form the Hebrew Association of Young Men's and Young Women's Clubs, which subsequently developed into the Young Men's–Young Women's Hebrew Association (YM–YWHA). Initially focused on sports and recreation, the association expanded to provide cultural, educational and social programmes for Toronto's Jewish community.

The YMHA initially operated from rented premises, including the Brunswick Avenue Talmud Torah, before opening a dedicated facility on Brunswick Avenue in 1937. The association offered athletic activities including basketball, swimming, boxing, weightlifting and wrestling. Its programmes subsequently expanded to accommodate a wider range of recreational and community activities.

In 1948, a fundraising campaign began to construct a larger community centre at the intersection of Bloor Street and Spadina Avenue. The campaign raised approximately $1.5 million, and the new YM–YWHA facility opened in 1953. Commonly known as the Bloor Street Y or Bloor Y, it became a centre for Jewish recreational, cultural and social activities in downtown Toronto. As Toronto's Jewish population expanded northward, an additional facility, the north campus, was established at Bathurst Street and Sheppard Avenue in 1961, later known as the Bathurst Jewish Community Centre. The association adopted the Jewish Community Centre (JCC) name in 1978.

The centre at Bloor and Spadina was established in 1953 following a fundraising campaign that began in 1948 and raised approximately $1.5 million for construction. The original building served as a recreational and social centre for Toronto's Jewish community.

The Toronto architectural firm Kaplan & Sprachman, which designed numerous theatres and Jewish community institutions across Canada, contributed to the original YM–YWHA building in collaboration with other architectural firms.

By the late 1990s, the building required substantial repairs, and closure was considered. Instead, a major renovation was undertaken in the early 2000s. The $14-million project was supported by a $2.5-million donation from Toronto businessman and philanthropist Miles Nadal, after whom the centre was renamed, and $5 million in funding from the UJA Federation of Greater Toronto. The renovated centre reopened in 2004.

The renovations included improvements to the swimming pool and fitness facilities, new meeting rooms, and the creation of the Al Green Theatre. The building's exterior was also redesigned with a glazed curtain wall, limestone cladding and a curved metal entrance feature.

== Facilities and programming ==
The centre contains a fitness centre, swimming pool, gymnasium, classrooms, childcare facilities and the 285-seat Al Green Theatre. It houses the Paul Penna Downtown Jewish Day School and offers programmes in the performing arts, Jewish culture, education and recreation.

Although rooted in Jewish traditions, the centre's programmes and services are open to people of all backgrounds.

== Recognition ==
In 2016, the centre received three honours from the JCC Association of North America, including awards recognizing its accessibility and inclusion initiatives and its Hebrew-language programming.

== See also ==
- Prosserman Jewish Community Centre (located in North York)
- History of the Jews in Toronto
- Jewish community center
- Miles Nadal
