= Al Hollingworth =

Canadian politician

Al Hollingworth QC

Member of the Canadian Parliament for York Centre
- In office 1953–1957
- Preceded by: Riding established
- Succeeded by: Fred C. Stinson

Personal details
- Born: Allan Henry Hollingworth; August 28, 1918 Brockville, Ontario, Canada
- Died: August 16, 2005 (aged 86)
- Party: Liberal
- Education: Queen's University
- Occupation: Lawyer

Allan Henry Hollingworth QC (August 28, 1918 – August 16, 2005) was a Canadian, lawyer, politician, and judge.

Born in Brockville, Ontario, he attended Brockville Collegiate Institute before receiving a Bachelor of Arts degree and a Bachelor of Commerce degree both from Queen's University in 1942. During World War II, he served as an intelligence officer in the Royal Canadian Air Force. Returning from the war, he graduated from Osgoode Hall Law School in 1948 and started practising law in North York, Ontario. He was called to the Ontario Bar in 1948 and was created a Queen's Counsel in 1958.

In the 1953 federal election, he defeated Roy Thomson, the Progressive Conservative Party candidate and newspaper publisher, and was elected to the House of Commons of Canada as the Liberal Party candidate for the riding of York Centre. He was given the honour of replying to the Speech from the Throne on behalf of the Government at the opening of Parliament. He was defeated in the 1957 election and again in the 1958 election, when the riding elected a Progressive Conservative candidate.

In 1973, he was appointed to Peel County court and became a Justice of the Supreme Court of Ontario in 1977. He served until 1997.

He was married to Veronica and had two daughters, Michelle and Roxanne.
