= People's Party of Canada =

Federal political party

People's Party of Canada Parti populaire du Canada
- Abbreviation: PPC
- Leader: Maxime Bernier
- Founder: Maxime Bernier
- Founded: September 14, 2018; 8 years ago
- Split from: Conservative Party of Canada
- Headquarters: 700-1 Nicholas Street; Ottawa, Ontario; K1N 7B7
- Youth wing: New Generation PPC
- Membership (2025): ▼17,720
- Ideology: Right-wing populism; Libertarian conservatism; Social conservatism
- Political position: Right-wing to far-right
- Colours: Purple
- Senate: 0 / 105
- House of Commons: 0 / 343

Website
- peoplespartyofcanada.ca

The People's Party of Canada (PPC; French: Parti populaire du Canada) is a federal political party in Canada. The party was formed by Maxime Bernier in September 2018, shortly after his resignation from the Conservative Party of Canada. It is placed from the right to the far-right on the political spectrum according to a variety of sources.

Bernier, a former candidate for the 2017 Conservative Party of Canada leadership election and cabinet minister, was the People's Party's only Member of Parliament (MP) from its founding in 2018 to his defeat in the 2019 Canadian federal election. In that election, the PPC formed electoral district associations in 326 ridings, and ran candidates in 315 of Canada's 338 ridings; however, no candidate was elected under its banner and Bernier lost his bid for personal re-election in Beauce. The party ran 312 candidates in the 2021 Canadian federal election; the party increased its share of the popular vote to nearly 5%, but again elected no MPs. In the 2025 Canadian federal election, it achieved its worst result yet, winning less than 1% of the popular vote.

The party has been described primarily as conservative with right-wing populist policies. Specific policies advocated by the party include reducing immigration to Canada to 150,000 entrants per year, scrapping the Canadian Multiculturalism Act, withdrawing from the Paris Agreement, ending corporate welfare, and ending supply management. In the 2021 federal election, the PPC also ran in opposition to COVID-19 lockdowns and restrictions, vaccine passports, and compulsory vaccinations.

== History ==
=== Formation ===
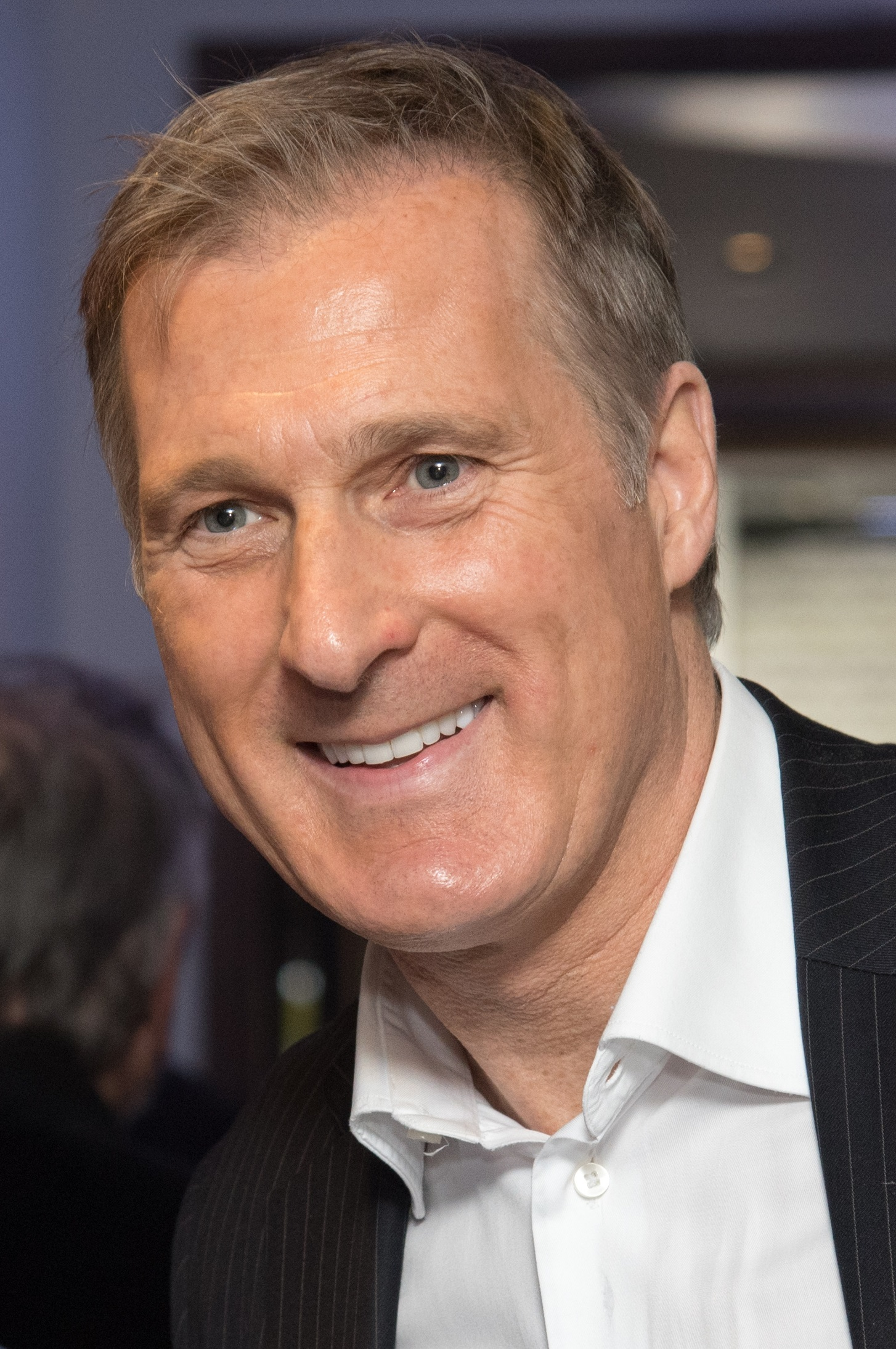
Bernier in 2017

The PPC was formed a few weeks after the resignation of Maxime Bernier, a candidate in the 2017 Conservative Party of Canada leadership election and former cabinet minister from the Conservative Party of Canada. In his resignation speech, Bernier stated that he was leaving because "I've come to realize ... this party is too intellectually and morally corrupt to be reformed." Bernier also stated that under opposition leader Andrew Scheer, to whom Bernier finished runner-up in the 2017 party leadership election, the Conservative Party had abandoned its principles on issues including political correctness, corporate welfare, equalization payments reform, and supply management. In a National Post op-ed, Bernier stated that his motive for forming the party was to reverse the public choice dynamic in the Canadian political system resulting in vote-buying and pandering by political parties. He reiterated his belief that the Conservative Party could not be reformed to end this practice, and that a new political party was required.

Bernier was accused by prominent Conservative politicians such as former prime ministers Stephen Harper and Brian Mulroney of trying to divide the political right. He responded on the CBC Television show Power & Politics that he wanted to focus on disaffected voters, and cited the political rise of French president Emmanuel Macron as an example. Bernier later cited the breakthrough of the People's Alliance of New Brunswick in the 2018 New Brunswick general election and the Coalition Avenir Québec win in the 2018 Quebec general election as examples of voters' disdain for traditional political parties and expressing their desire for change by voting for new parties.

Prior to his resignation from the Conservative Party, Bernier had begun reestablishing contact with individuals who had supported his 2017 Conservative leadership bid; they believed he had the necessary support to register a party with Elections Canada. Le Devoir reported that members of seven Conservative constituency associations defected to the party. A few days after announcing the party name, Libertarian Party of Canada leader Tim Moen, who had previously offered the leadership of that party to Bernier, stated that he was open to the idea of a merger with the People's Party. When asked by Global News, Bernier indicated he had no interest in a merger. In early September 2018, The Canadian Nationalist Party reached out to the People's Party "to see if there would be any interest in possibly co-operating with the Canadian Nationalist Party." Bernier declined any further discussions with Patron.

When asked about organizing by the party, Bernier mentioned that he would use tools that did not exist in the past, such as social media.

Bernier planned to run candidates in all of Canada's 338 federal ridings in the 2019 Canadian federal election. The party's registration documents were officially submitted to Elections Canada on October 10, 2018. In addition, he stated that electoral district associations (EDA) would be in place by December 31, 2018, and that the EDAs would start focusing on finding candidates starting in January 2019. On November 1, 2018, the party revealed that it had over 30,000 "founding members". News outlets later revealed that one of the PPC's founding members was a former American white nationalist, and that two others had ties to anti-immigration groups. The former white nationalist was removed from the party on August 29, 2019, after his past came to light. A spokesperson for the party stated that his past did not come up during the vetting process since he came from the United States. The two other members denied having racist views; the party later told Le Devoir that they did not have enough resources to vet them at the beginning of the PPC's formation.

In November 2018, The Minister of Democratic Institutions Karina Gould said that Bernier would qualify for debates hosted by the Leaders' Debates Commission if the party nominated candidates in 90% of ridings. The party held rallies in Vancouver, Calgary, Toronto, Ottawa–Gatineau, Winnipeg, Saskatoon, and Quebec City. In 2019, it held rallies in Hamilton, Saint John, and Halifax. On December 21, 2018, the party established EDAs in all 338 electoral districts.

=== Registration ===
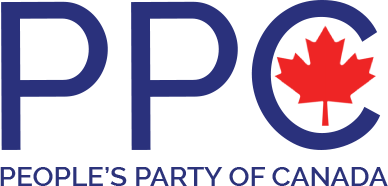
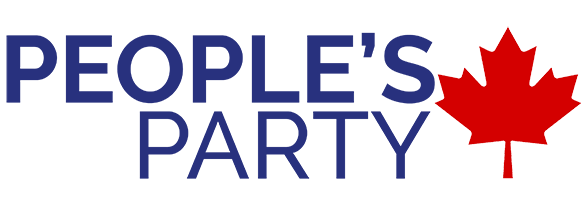
Previous party logos, 2018–2021

The party received its eligibility status on November 11, 2018. It was registered by Elections Canada on January 19, 2019, after nominating candidates for by-elections in Outremont, York—Simcoe, and Burnaby South, which were called for February 25, 2019, and Nanaimo—Ladysmith. In the February 25 by-elections, the party received 10.9% of the vote in Burnaby South and 1.5% in each of York—Simcoe and Outremont.

=== 2019 federal election ===
For the forthcoming 2019 Canadian federal election, Bernier told the National Post that the party would start candidate nominations after the 2019 by-elections. On March 25, 2019, Bernier announced in a press conference that the party had opened an online search for candidates until April 23, with candidate selection meetings to follow between May 7 and 13. In an interview on the CTV television show Power Play, he said that the party planned to have their first convention from June 1 to 2. The party held its conference from August 18 to 19, where "roughly 500 party officials took part in door knocking workshops, traditional media and social media training, debate training and mock debate."

The PPC underwent several controversies during the campaign. In April 2019, Angelo Isidorou, a party executive and the Vancouver Quadra district association president, resigned; he stated that the party was an "utter free-for-all" and had been "hijacked by egomaniacs". Isidorou was one of the earliest individuals to blow the whistle on internal racism within the party. More resignations followed Isidorou and echoed accusations that the party had been infiltrated by "racist, xenophobic, homophobic and downright hateful people". In July 2019, the entire People's Party of Canada board in Elmwood—Transcona publicly sent a resignation letter, claiming that "racists", "anti-Semites" and "conspiracy theorists" had taken over and were promoting "the closure of Canada's "physical and economic borders" and had "spread misinformation through personal and official channels". They cited disillusionment towards the party's increasingly xenophobic nature and lack of focus towards economic discussion as their core reasons for resigning. Steven Fletcher, PPC candidate for Charleswood—St. James—Assiniboia—Headingley, rejected the accusation, claiming the action is rooted in vindictiveness against Bernier. The manager of the Elmwood—Transcona Facebook page responded to the criticism by stating: "Our problem is not necessarily with Max [Bernier] himself, but the entire organization has deep-rooted problems." The Winnipeg South Centre EDA argued that it was normal for a party to have "people with crazy ideas and racists" and wanted to know how the party reacted to it. Fletcher disputed their statement, stating that "they'd be kicked out pretty fast" if they held any such viewpoints, and touted the diversity of the PPC's candidates. Fletcher claimed that "some elements of the NDP and the Green Party" have "anti-Semitic viewpoints" and that there was an "anti-Quebec vibe" in online forums from "people supporting [Conservative Party leader] Andrew Scheer." The PPC later told Global News that the removal of the white nationalist was an example of the party taking a stand against racism.

Ultimately, the party formed electoral district associations in 326 ridings, and ran candidates in 315 ridings, of Canada's total 338 ridings. In the 2019 federal election, Bernier lost his own seat to a Conservative, and no People's Party candidates were elected. Bernier was the only People's Party candidate to come close to winning; he won 28.4% of the vote (a 20-point drop from 2015), and no other candidate of the party won more than 4% of the vote. The party received approximately 1.6% of the popular vote nationwide. According to the Canadian Press, the PPC may have cost the Conservatives some ridings but did not garner enough votes to affect the overall result.

=== After the 2019 federal election ===
On February 24, 2020, Elections Canada deregistered 38 of the party's EDAs for failing to comply with reporting requirements. The deregistered EDAs would not be able to accept contributions or issue tax receipts unless they remedy their status with Elections Canada and become re-registered. Two candidates (including Maxime Bernier) ran for the Toronto Centre and York Centre by-election, following the resignations of Michael Levitt and Bill Morneau; however, both candidates were unsuccessful in their campaigns, garnering under 3.6% of the popular vote in each riding, and other EDAs have voluntarily deregistered.

=== 2021 federal election ===
The PPC announced it would contest the 2021 federal election with the same platform it used in 2019 and with Bernier running in his former riding of Beauce. The PPC also announced its opposition to further COVID-19 restrictions and lockdown measures, vaccine passports, and compulsory vaccinations as part of its campaign.

The PPC gained around 5% of the popular vote, an improvement on its 2019 result and surpassing the Green Party of Canada in terms of vote share, with some PPC candidates finishing a distant second in the ridings they contested. However, the party did not see any candidates elected with Bernier again losing to the Conservatives in Beauce.

Following the election, some political scientists and commentators debated whether the PPC's slightly stronger performance contributed to the Conservatives under Erin O'Toole losing to the Liberals. This view was endorsed by Mainstreet Research CEO Quito Maggi and University of Toronto political science professor Nelson Wiseman, who posited that the PPC may have cost the Conservatives at least ten ridings. It has also been described as not a simple generalization, as a significant amount of PPC support arose from non-Conservative voters.

=== After the 2021 federal election ===
The PPC organized a rally in Waterloo, Ontario, featuring Bernier and independent MPP Randy Hillier, to support the Freedom Convoy 2022's call to end COVID-19 mandates. The PPC candidate in the 2022 Mississauga—Lakeshore federal by-election garnered 1.2% of the vote. The PPC ran candidates in each of the 2023 federal by-elections, in the ridings of Winnipeg South Centre, Notre-Dame-de-Grâce—Westmount, Portage—Lisgar and Oxford. Party leader Maxime Bernier, who ran in Portage-Lisgar, won the party's highest vote share at 17% but still lost the election. The PPC's "Western Lieutenant" Kelly Lorencz ran in the Calgary Heritage July 24, 2023 by-election, and lost.

Patricia Conlin ran as the PPC candidate in the March 4, 2024 by-election in the riding of Durham, following the resignation of Erin O'Toole. She received 4.43% of the vote. In 2021, she received 5.50% of the vote. The party ran Dennis Wilson in the June 24 by-election in Toronto—St. Paul's earning 0.64% of the vote. In the September 16 LaSalle—Émard—Verdun by-election, the party ran Gregory Yablunovsky who earned 0.49% of the vote. Lastly, in the simultaneous Elmwood—Transcona by-election, the party stood Sarah Couture who earned 1.25% of the vote.

=== 2025 federal election ===
On October 18, 2024, Maxime Bernier stated that Hardeep Singh Nijjar was not a Canadian; Bernier further stated that Nijjar should never have held Canadian citizenship, and that Nijjar's murder by Indian intelligence was part of "tribal conflicts."

On January 28, 2025, former PPC candidate for Regina—Lewvan, Trevor Wowk, faced three new charges of violating the provincial Tobacco Tax Act, the federal Excise Act, and another violation of the Criminal Code of Canada. This is on top of two charges of improper storage of two different guns, and two charges for possessing the guns without being the holder of a licence.

The party centered most of its efforts on races in Alberta, due to that being the province where they saw the greatest increased vote share in 2021 compared to 2019. The party touted the independence of their candidates, stating if elected they would not be policed by a party whip and could vote as their constituents please. However, Trevor Harrison, a retired political sociologist at the University of Lethbridge, stated it was likely that PPC voters would strategically vote for the Conservatives due to the high stakes of the election. Bernier again ran in Beauce.

On March 24, 2025, the CTV erroneously displayed a visual claiming that PPC was polling in third place and on track to win 84 seats. All polls show the PPC winning zero seats.

The election resulted in a collapse in support for the PPC nationwide, winning less than 1% of the vote, with Bernier himself coming fourth in his riding of Beauce.

Bernier won a leadership review in July 2025, with 79.1% of the vote, a drop from his 2021 review numbers, when he garnered 95.6%. The voter participation rate was 32.7% compared to 57% in 2021.

== Principles and policies ==
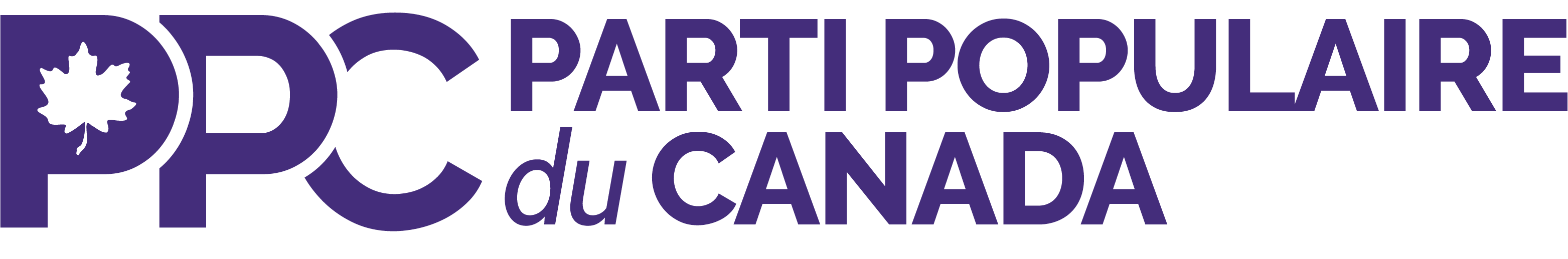
French party logo

The PPC has been described primarily as a conservative party with right-wing populist and libertarian policies. It is generally seen as being on the right to far-right of the left–right political spectrum. A number of political scientists have also described Bernier's rhetoric as reminiscent of classical liberalism.

The party describes its ideology as a mixture of "common sense, populism, classical conservatism, and libertarianism". Bernier stated that his party is "a coalition of people who are disenchanted with traditional politicians who say one thing one day, and another the next". He mentioned that his platform would be based around the principles of freedom, responsibility, fairness, and respect. Bernier stated that these principles are non-negotiable, but that members would have input on policies as they are refined, and that a candidate questionnaire asks potential candidates about which policies they want in the platform. In addition to these principles, the party would advocate for "smart populism", which Bernier defines as "populism without emotions", speaking for "all Canadians", and not appeasing "special interest groups". Bernier has described the party as a "grassroots party". He has also stated that the party is neither left wing nor right wing, preferring the difference between being free and not free. Bernier told Vassy Kapelos that the party would debate discussions that "the leadership and the caucus" did not want to have while he was a Conservative Party member, also stating that people who espouse antisemitic, racist, or xenophobic positions "are not welcome" in the party. A spokesperson has stated that the party does not debate the science of climate change.

At the time of its formation, the party indicated that its formal platform would be gradually unveiled, but it would generally follow the platform that Bernier ran on during his 2017 Conservative leadership campaign. Bernier stated that the platform "will be built on facts". He said that socially conservative issues such as abortion and gender identity would not be part of the party platform. The party supports removing trade barriers between Canada's provinces.

=== Economy ===
Prominent platform planks include ending corporate welfare and phasing out supply management over a number of years to allow farmers to adapt through compensation yet "save Canadians billions of dollars annually" through lower prices. Following the launch of the party, Bernier stated in a TV interview with BNN Bloomberg that the telecom industry deregulation, increasing airline competition, reducing tax brackets and having a discussion about the privatization of Canada Post, which were key components of his original 2017 Conservative leadership platform, are all areas that he has an interest in.

=== Environment ===
The party's platform states that "it is an undisputed fact that the world's climate has always changed and will continue to change" but rejects the scientific consensus on climate change, which it calls "climate change alarmism". The party plans to withdraw from the global warming fight, withdraw from the Paris Climate Accord, abolish subsidies for green technology, expand the oil and gas industries, scrap "the Liberal government's carbon tax", but allow the private sector and the provinces to address climate issues, and "invest [in] mitigation strategies" if negative effects result from climate change. The party's main focus would be on "implementing practical solutions to make Canada's air, water and soil cleaner".

=== Foreign affairs ===
The party platform says that foreign policies should be "focused on the security and prosperity of Canadians, not an ideological approach that compromises our interests". It supports multilateralism, non-interventionism, free trade, and humanitarianism; however, it plans to not get involved in foreign conflicts, "unless we have a compelling strategic interest in doing so", to reduce Canada's United Nations (UN) presence "to a minimum", withdraw from UN commitments the party sees as threatening "our sovereignty", to accept free trade agreements that protect Canada's economy "from the threat of potentially hostile foreign investors", and phase out development aid.

The party opposed Canadian military support for Ukraine during the Russo-Ukrainian War and criticized NATO expansion in Eastern Europe.

Bernier also took a neutral stance on the Gaza war, stating that he wanted to "keep Canada out of this conflict in the Middle East".

=== LGBTQ rights ===
The party has come out against Bill C-16, which added gender identity and expression as prohibited grounds of discrimination under the Canadian Human Rights Act and the Criminal Code, and expressed a desire to modify Bill C-6, which bans conversion therapy, to add an exemption for youth with gender dysphoria.

The official party policy on transgender people focuses on two areas: transgender women being present in women's spaces and "[radical activists who] teach children that their gender is determined by stereotypes and if they do not fit into the traditional male or female gender roles, encourage them to think they may have been born in the wrong body."

Their proposed measures are to make the medical transition of minors illegal, defund groups that promote "gender ideology" and sex change operations and ban transgender women from women's prisons, shelters, bathrooms, changing rooms and sports.

They also vowed to repeal Bill C-4 and Bill C-16 which bans conversion therapy and allows gender self-identification respectively.

The PPC claims that "cultural Marxists and radical activists in the media, government, and schools have made every effort to normalize toxic transgender ideology".

=== Health care ===
The party's platform states "it is up to the provinces to implement reforms in line with the more efficient and less costly mixed universal systems of other developed countries. Throwing more federal money at the problem is not the right approach." They plan to replace the Canada Health Transfer with a "transfer of tax points of equivalent value to the provinces and territories" by giving up the goods and services tax (GST) revenue collected by the federal government while creating a temporary program "to compensate poorer provinces" disadvantaged by the replacement. The party claims this would create the conditions for provincial and territorial governments to innovate, while maintaining the Canada Health Act. The party has shown vaccine hesitancy. Bernier and the PPC are opposed to vaccination mandates and support the lifting of pandemic restrictions.

=== Immigration ===
The party plans immigration reform, such as limiting immigration to no more than 150,000 people per year, by removing the parents and grandparents class from the family reunification program, focusing on economic immigration through the reform of the immigration point system, making temporary foreign workers noncompetitive with "Canadian workers", and banning birth tourism.

They intend that all immigrants would undergo in-person interviews with immigration officials to determine whether their values and ideas accord with Canadian "societal norms".

The party would declare the entire border a port of entry to make deportation easier, since new arrivals can be refused at ports of entry. They would build border fences at popular ports of entry crossings for migrants, rely on private sponsorship instead of government support for funding new refugees, but prioritize those "belonging to persecuted groups barred from neighbouring countries" and sexual minorities.

=== Multiculturalism ===
The party platform advocates for the cultural integration of immigrants, stating that it "enriches" Canadian society; in particular, the party criticized that the government "has pursued a policy of official multiculturalism that encourages immigrants to keep the values and culture they left behind instead of integrating into Canadian society and adopting Canadian values and culture." Some of the examples that they have listed as "distinct values of a contemporary Western civilization" are "equality between men and women", "separation of state and religion", "toleration and pluralism".

The party classified Prime Minister Justin Trudeau's comments referring to Canada as "the first post-national state, with no core identity" as a "cult of diversity". It opposes the Canadian Multiculturalism Act, remarking that Canada's government should not help immigrants preserve their cultural heritage. The party intends to "repeal the Multiculturalism Act and eliminate all funding to promote multiculturalism."

=== Veterans ===
On the topic of veterans, the party platform says that "The government of Canada has an obligation to honour the nation's sacred commitment to our military men and women and make sure our veterans receive the support they deserve." It also plans to "enshrine in legislation the country's obligations to our veterans in a Military Covenant", reinstate fair military disability pensions and reemphasize the legislative guarantee of the "benefit of doubt" standard in the Pension Act, review the New Veterans Charter to determine which policies and programs should be retained, simplify the system, and make it easier to navigate.

=== Self-defence ===
As part of Bernier's bid for the seat of Portage—Lisgar in 2023, the PPC published its "self-defence policy", stating it would remove pepper spray from the list of prohibited weapons and make it legal to possess and carry it for self-defence.

=== Abortion ===
The party opposes abortion. Bernier promised that if he is elected to Parliament, one of the first things he will do is "reopen the debate on abortion laws in Canada" and push for more restrictions on abortion.

== Election results ==
| Election | Leader | Candidates | Seats | +/− | Votes | % | Rank | Position | Notes |
|---|---|---|---|---|---|---|---|---|---|
| 2019 | Maxime Bernier | 315 | 0 / 338 (0%) | Steady | 294,092 | 1.6 | 6th | No seats | Liberal minority |
| 2021 | Maxime Bernier | 312 | 0 / 338 (0%) | Steady | 840,990 | 4.9 | 6th | No seats | Liberal minority |
| 2025 | Maxime Bernier | 247 | 0 / 343 (0%) | Steady | 141,210 | 0.7 | 6th | No seats | Liberal minority |

Alberta Senate nominee elections
| Election | Votes | % | Elected |
|---|---|---|---|
| 2021 | 315,389 | 15.0 | 0 / 3 |

== See also ==
- Canadian Alliance
- Populism in Canada
- Reform Party of Canada
