= Mark Adler (politician) =

Canadian politician (born 1962)

Member of Parliament for York Centre
- In office May 2, 2011 – August 4, 2015
- Preceded by: Ken Dryden
- Succeeded by: Michael Levitt

Personal details
- Born: March 17, 1962 (age 64) Toronto, Ontario, Canada
- Party: Conservative
- Spouse: Alison
- Children: 2
- Education: University of Toronto
- Profession: Businessman

Mark Adler (born March 17, 1962) is a former Canadian politician. He was a Conservative member of the House of Commons of Canada from 2011 to 2015. He represented the Toronto riding of York Centre.

== Background ==
Adler attended William Lyon Mackenzie Collegiate Institute, graduating in 1981. He graduated from the University of Toronto in 1984 and Carleton University Graduate School of Public Administration in Ottawa. He worked for Canadian Institute of International Affairs and was a trade representative in the Government of Ontario's office in Boston, Massachusetts. In 2003 he founded and chaired the Economic Club of Toronto.

== Politics ==
Adler was elected to the Canadian Parliament in the 2011 federal election, when he defeated the Liberal incumbent Ken Dryden. In January 2014, he travelled with Prime Minister Stephen Harper on a trip to Israel. During a visit to the wailing wall, he urged an aide to the prime minister to allow him to get a photograph with Harper. He said, "It's the re-election! This is the million-dollar shot." The aide declined his request.

Adler was criticized during the 2015 federal election campaign for putting "son of a Holocaust survivor" on an election poster. Adler has also claimed in biographical and campaign materials to be the first child of Holocaust survivors elected to the House of Commons. Former MP Raymonde Folco, who sat in the House of Commons as a Liberal from 1997 to 2011 and is also a child of survivors, challenged this claim. The claim was removed from Adler's campaign page in August 2015. Adler's campaign manager Georgeanne Burke said the claim was "an honest mistake," since Folco "never spoke publicly about her background." Asked about Adler's behaviour, Folco told the Canadian Jewish News that she found it "disgusting" for Adler "to use the Holocaust in this way, for personal ends."

In the 2015 federal election, Adler did not succeed in his bid for re-election, with Liberal candidate Michael Levitt winning.

== Electoral record ==
2015 Canadian federal election: York Centre
Party	Candidate	Votes	%	±%	Expenditures
Liberal	Michael Levitt	20,109	46.9	+13.7	–
Conservative	Mark Adler	18,893	44.0	-4.5	–
New Democratic	Hal Berman	3,148	7.3	-8.6	–
Green	Constantine Kritsonis	794	1.8	-0.5	–
Total valid votes/expense limit		42,944	100.0		$198,299.74
Total rejected ballots		319	–	–	
Turnout		43,263	–	–	
Eligible voters		64,297			
Source: Elections Canada

2011 Canadian federal election
Party	Candidate	Votes	%	±%	Expenditures
Conservative	Mark Adler	20,356	48.5	+10.5	$79,794.56
Liberal	Ken Dryden	13,979	33.3	-10.2	$73,675.98
New Democratic	Nick Brownlee	6,656	15.9	+3.8	$409.63
Green	Rosemary Frei	979	2.3	-4.1	$342.41
Total valid votes/Expense limit		41,970	100.0	$83,892.08	
Total rejected ballots		350	0.1	–	
Turnout		42,320	60.3	+7.6	
Eligible voters		70,216	–	–	
