= Roman Baber =

Canadian politician (born 1980)

Roman Baber MP
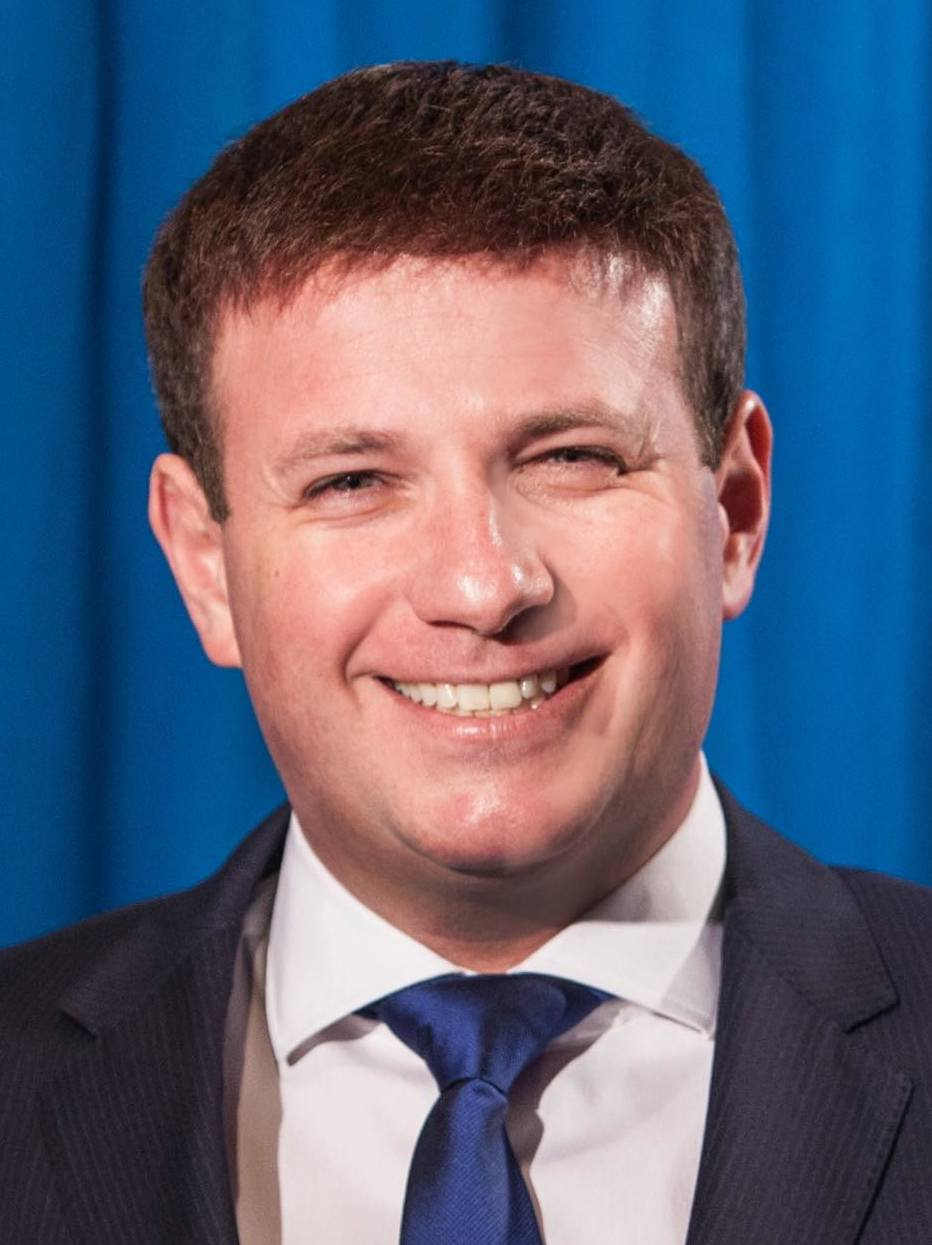
- Baber in 2016

Member of Parliament for North York (York Centre; 2025–2026)
- Incumbent
- Assumed office April 28, 2025
- Preceded by: Ya'ara Saks

Member of Provincial Parliament for York Centre
- In office June 7, 2018 – May 3, 2022
- Preceded by: Monte Kwinter
- Succeeded by: Michael Kerzner

Personal details
- Born: August 9, 1980 (age 46) Leningrad, Soviet Union
- Party: Conservative (federal)
- Other political affiliations: Progressive Conservative (provincial; until 2021)
- Occupation: Politician; lawyer
- Website: www.joinroman.ca

Roman Baber MP (born August 9, 1980) is a Canadian politician who has represented the riding of North York (formerly "York Centre") in the House of Commons of Canada since 2025 as a Member of Parliament for the Conservative Party.

Baber was the Member of Provincial Parliament (MPP) for York Centre from 2018 to 2022. He defeated Joe Oliver, Canada's former Minister of Finance, in the 2017 Progressive Conservative Party of Ontario Candidate nomination contest for York Centre. Baber was elected as a member of the Ontario PC Caucus in 2018 until he was removed by Premier Doug Ford, the party leader, in January 2021. He sat as an independent until the dissolution of the Legislative Assembly on May 3, 2022.

He was a candidate in the 2022 leadership election of the Conservative Party of Canada. In August 2023, Baber was announced as the federal Conservative candidate for York Centre, ultimately winning the seat in the 2025 election.

== Early life ==
Baber was born in Leningrad, Soviet Union, to a Jewish family. Two of his maternal great-grandparents were killed in The Holocaust in Odessa, Ukraine, in 1941. He and his family moved to Israel when he was eight, before immigrating to Canada in 1995, when he was 15.

Baber's family settled in Toronto in the Bathurst Street and Sheppard Avenue area, an area he represents. He is a lawyer by profession and attended William Lyon Mackenzie Collegiate Institute and York University, before earning his law degree at the University of Western Ontario.

== Political career ==
Baber was elected as the MPP for York Centre in the 2018 provincial election.

=== Autism file and Baber Report ===
In April 2019, Baber was asked by Premier Doug Ford to review the government's autism program. Baber's review, later termed the Baber Report, was provided anonymously to The Globe and Mail after it was shared with the government's Autism Advisory Panel. Parental groups and the Ontario Autism Coalition supported Baber's report. On July 29, 2019, the Ontario government apologized to the families of autistic children for the initial plan and acknowledged that the changes to the autism program announced earlier that year were poorly conceived.

=== Removal from Ontario PC Party ===
He was a member of the Progressive Conservative Party caucus until January 15, 2021 when Premier Doug Ford removed him from caucus over his opposition to the province's lockdown during the COVID-19 pandemic in Ontario, with Baber stating in an open letter to Premier Ford, "the lockdown is deadlier than COVID".

Baber was Chair of Parliament's Justice Policy Committee until his removal by a Government motion on February 16, 2021.

He did not run for re-election in the 2022 Ontario general election.

=== Federal Conservative leadership candidate ===
On March 9, 2022, Baber declared his intent to run in the 2022 Conservative Party of Canada leadership election. Baber ran on a platform of restoring Canada's democracy. Inspired by his ejection from Premier Doug Ford's PC caucus, Baber pledged to allow MPs to vote their conscience and express their personal views without fear of repercussions. He pledged to oppose Quebec's Bill 21 and Bill 96, repeal the Trudeau government's carbon tax, end Canada's equalization program, phase out supply management, and more. On September 10, it was announced that Pierre Poilievre won the leadership on the first ballot with 68.15% of the votes cast. Baber placed fourth, garnering 5.03% of the points and 5.4% of the votes cast.

=== Elected Member of Parliament in 2025 ===
On Monday, April 28, 2025, Roman Baber was elected as the Conservative Member of Parliament for York Centre. Following his election, Baber was immediately appointed to the Standing Committee on Justice and Human Rights. As a member of this committee, Baber has been outspoken in defending the rights and freedoms of Canadians. In July 2026, he was appointed to the Conservative Shadow Cabinet as the Shadow Minister for Civil Liberties.

=== Private Member's Legislation ===
On November 17, 2025, Baber introduced his first Private Member’s Bill in the House of Commons, Bill C-257, An Act to amend the Criminal Code (promotion of terrorist activity or group). If enacted, the Bill would make it an indictable offence (up to 5 years’ imprisonment) to willfully promote terrorist activity, a terrorist group, or any activity of a terrorist group through communicated statements. Baber has been an outspoken advocate on this and other issues affecting the Jewish community.

== Electoral record ==
=== Federal ===
2025 Canadian federal election: York Centre
** Preliminary results — Not yet official **
| Party | Candidate | Votes | % | ±% | Expenditures |
|---|---|---|---|---|---|
| Conservative | Roman Baber | 26,082 | 54.82 | +16.97 | |
| Liberal | Ya'ara Saks | 20,303 | 42.68 | –4.61 | |
| New Democratic | Yusuf Ulukanligil | 1,189 | 2.50 | –7.68 | |
| Total valid votes/expense limit | | | | | |
| Total rejected ballots | | | | | |
| Turnout | | 47,574 | 63.63 | | |
| Eligible voters | | 74,764 | | | |
| Conservative gain from Liberal | | Swing | | +10.79 | |
Source: Elections Canada

=== Conservative Party of Canada leadership ===
First round (points allocated)
| Poilievre | 68.15% |
| Charest | 16.07% |
| Lewis | 9.69% |
| Baber | 5.03% |
| Aitchison | 1.06% |

First round (votes cast)
| Poilievre | 70.7% |
| Charest | 11.6% |
| Lewis | 11.1% |
| Baber | 5.4% |
| Aitchison | 1.2% |

=== Ontario ===
2018 Ontario general election
| Party | Candidate | Votes | % | ±% |
|---|---|---|---|---|
| Progressive Conservative | Roman Baber | 18,434 | 50.15 | +19.29 |
| New Democratic | Andrea Vásquez Jiménez | 8,617 | 23.44 | +7.07 |
| Liberal | Ramon Estaris | 7,865 | 21.39 | -26.72 |
| Green | Roma Lyon | 843 | 2.29 | -0.96 |
| None of the Above | Cherie Ann Day | 467 | 1.27 | |
| Libertarian | Benjamin Kamminga | 398 | 1.08 | |
| Moderate | Alexander Leonov | 137 | 0.37 | |
| Total valid votes | | 36,761 | 98.51 | |
| Total rejected, unmarked and declined ballots | | 556 | 1.49 | |
| Turnout | | 37,317 | 52.92 | |
| Eligible voters | | 70,520 | | |
| Progressive Conservative notional gain from Liberal | | Swing | | +23.01 |
Source: Elections Ontario
