= Michael Levitt (politician) =

Canadian politician

Member of Parliament for York Centre
- In office October 19, 2015 – September 1, 2020
- Preceded by: Mark Adler
- Succeeded by: Ya'ara Saks

Personal details
- Born: May 9, 1970 (age 56) Edinburgh, Scotland
- Party: Liberal
- Education: McGill University

Michael Levitt is a former Canadian politician who represented the riding of York Centre in the House of Commons of Canada from 2015 to 2020 as a member of the Liberal Party.

== Background ==
Born and raised in Scotland, Levitt came with his family to Canada when he was 14. Levitt is Jewish.

Levitt served as Chair of the House of Commons Foreign Affairs Committee and Chair of the Canada-Israel Interparliamentary Group.

Before running for office, Levitt was a founding member of the Canadian Jewish Political Affairs Committee, co-chaired Liberal Friends of Israel, and served as a Partner and Vice-President of Business Development for the Benjamin Group in Toronto, a company providing lifecycle services to Toronto's Jewish community. He has also served on the boards of Mount Sinai Hospital and the Koffler Centre of the Arts, both located in Toronto.

Levitt was awarded with the King Charles III Coronation Medal on July 3, 2025 in recognition of his service and dedication to Canada. Levitt was nominated by former MP Marco Mendicino to receive the medal.

== Political career ==
Levitt was first elected to Parliament in the 2015 federal election, defeating the Conservative incumbent, Mark Adler. He was re-elected in the 2019 federal election.

On August 4, 2020, Levitt announced he would resign as an MP, effective September 1, 2020, to become the president and CEO of the Canadian regional office of the Friends of Simon Wiesenthal Center for Holocaust Studies.

== Electoral record ==
2019 Canadian federal election: York Centre
Party	Candidate	Votes	%	±%	Expenditures
Liberal	Michael Levitt	21,680	50.20	+3.32	$93,151.84
Conservative	Rachel Willson	15,852	36.71	−7.29	$89,344.00
New Democratic	Andrea Vásquez Jiménez	4,251	9.84	+2.51	none listed
Green	Rebecca Wood	1,403	3.25	+1.45	$0.00
Total valid votes/expense limit		43,186	98.48		
Total rejected ballots		665	1.52	+0.78	
Turnout		43,851	61.76	-3.96	
Eligible voters		71,000			
Liberal hold		Swing		+5.31	
Source: Elections Canada

2015 Canadian federal election: York Centre
Party	Candidate	Votes	%	±%	Expenditures
Liberal	Michael Levitt	20,109	46.9	+13.7	–
Conservative	Mark Adler	18,893	44.0	-4.5	–
New Democratic	Hal Berman	3,148	7.3	-8.6	–
Green	Constantine Kritsonis	794	1.8	-0.5	–
Total valid votes/expense limit		42,944	100.0		$198,299.74
Total rejected ballots		319	–	–	
Turnout		43,263	–	–	
Eligible voters		64,297			
Source: Elections Canada
