= Maxime Bernier =

Canadian politician (born 1963)

The Honourable Maxime Bernier PC
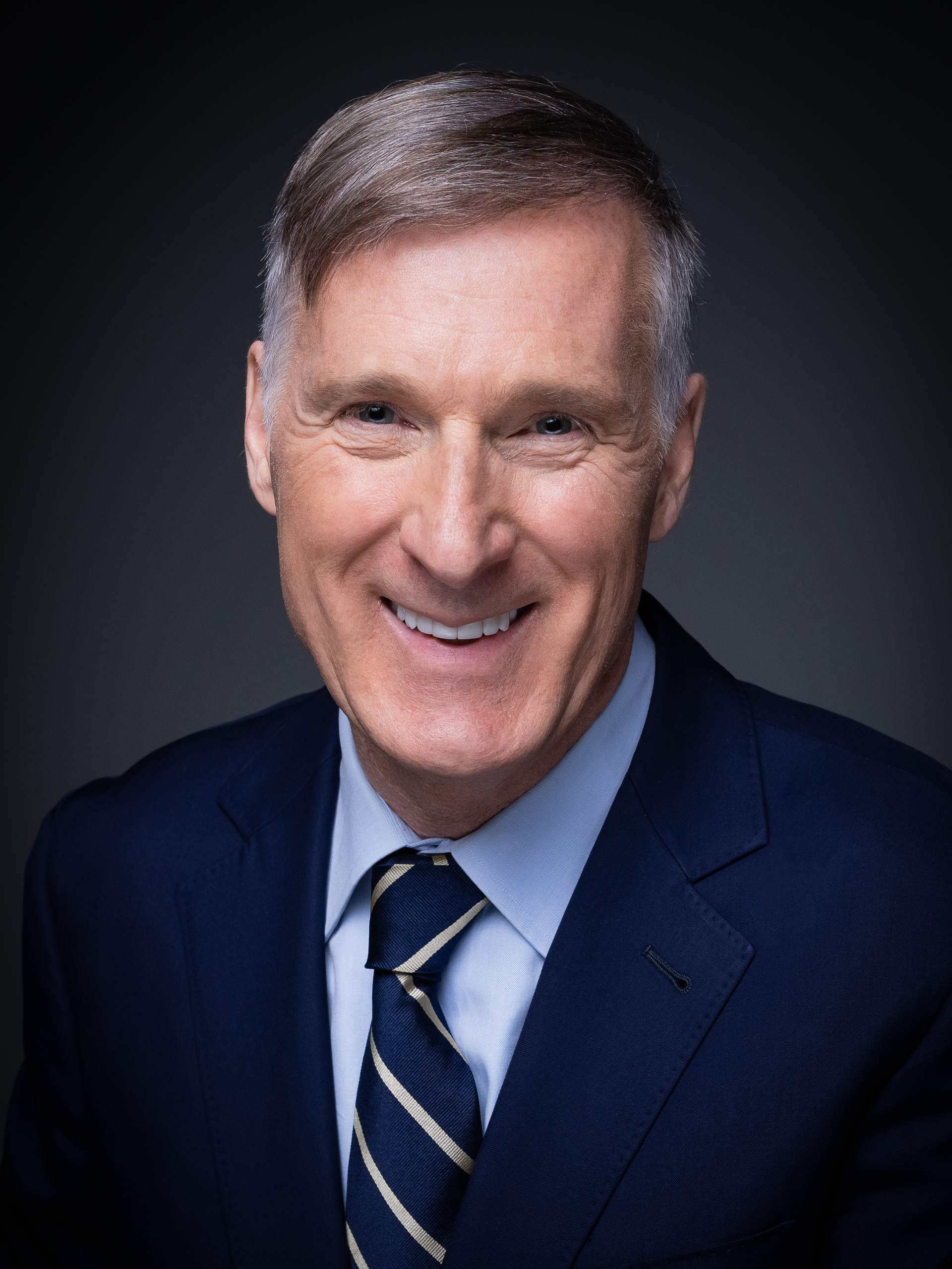
- Bernier in 2023

Leader of the People's Party
- Incumbent
- Assumed office September 14, 2018
- Preceded by: Office established

Minister of State (Small Business and Tourism, and Agriculture) (Note: Office became known as "Minister of State (Small Business and Tourism)" from 2008 to 2013.)
- In office May 18, 2011 – November 4, 2015
- Prime Minister: Stephen Harper
- Preceded by: Rob Moore
- Succeeded by: Bardish Chagger

Chair of the National Defence Select Committee
- In office March 9, 2009 – June 20, 2011
- Preceded by: Rick Casson
- Succeeded by: James Bezan

Minister of Foreign Affairs
- In office August 13, 2007 – May 26, 2008
- Prime Minister: Stephen Harper
- Preceded by: Peter MacKay
- Succeeded by: David Emerson

Minister of Industry Registrar General of Canada
- In office February 6, 2006 – August 13, 2007
- Prime Minister: Stephen Harper
- Preceded by: David Emerson
- Succeeded by: Jim Prentice

Member of Parliament for Beauce
- In office January 23, 2006 – October 21, 2019
- Preceded by: Claude Drouin
- Succeeded by: Richard Lehoux

Personal details
- Born: January 18, 1963 (age 63) Saint-Georges, Quebec, Canada
- Party: People's (since 2018)
- Other political affiliations: Conservative (until 2018)
- Spouses: Caroline Chauvin (m. 1991; div. 2005) Catherine Letarte (m. 2019)
- Children: 2
- Parent: Gilles Bernier (father)
- Education: Université du Québec à Montréal (BCom); University of Ottawa (LLB)
- Profession: Author, businessman, consultant, lawyer

Maxime Bernier PC (French pronunciation: [maksim bɛʁnje]; born January 18, 1963) is a Canadian politician who is the founder and leader of the People's Party of Canada (PPC). Formerly a member of the Conservative Party, Bernier left the caucus in 2018 to form the PPC. He was the member of Parliament (MP) for Beauce from 2006 to 2019 and served as a Cabinet minister in the Harper government.

Before entering politics, Bernier worked in law, finance and banking. He was first elected to the House of Commons as a Conservative in the 2006 election in the same riding his father, Gilles Bernier, had represented from 1984 to 1997. Bernier held a number of portfolios in Prime Minister Stephen Harper's Cabinet. He was industry minister from 2006 to 2007 before being promoted to foreign affairs minister until he stepped down in 2008 after failing to secure confidential documents. He continued to sit as a back-bench MP until 2011, when he was appointed as Minister of State for small business and tourism. Following the 2015 election, while the Conservatives were no longer in power, Bernier was re-elected as an MP.

Bernier ran for the Conservative Party leadership in the 2017 leadership election. His campaign garnered significant media attention mainly due to its libertarian platform which promised to end corporate welfare, eliminate the capital gains tax, and abolish supply management in the Canadian dairy industry. After leading eventual winner Andrew Scheer through 12 rounds of voting, he came second with over 49 per cent in the 13th round. Fifteen months later, in August 2018, Bernier resigned from the Conservative Party to create his own party, the People's Party of Canada, citing disagreements with Scheer's leadership. He lost his parliamentary seat in the 2019 election to Conservative Richard Lehoux, ending parliamentary representation of the PPC. Since then, he has unsuccessfully run for election in several ridings, including Beauce in 2021 and 2025.

In addition to taking economic libertarian positions, he opposes mass immigration to Canada, proposes repealing the Multiculturalism Act, supports more restrictions on abortion, and rejects the scientific consensus on climate change. During the COVID-19 pandemic in Canada, he opposed mandatory vaccinations, public health measures, and attended many anti-lockdown protests; he was arrested for violating public health orders at a gathering in Manitoba.

== Early life and education ==
Bernier was born in Saint-Georges, Quebec, the son of Doris (Rodrigue) and Gilles Bernier, a well known radio host, who represented the riding of Beauce from 1984 to 1997, first as a Progressive Conservative and then as an independent. In a 2010 interview with John Geddes, Bernier said he respects his father as a Mulroney-era politician, but tries not to emulate his style. Bernier has stated that his views were shaped from his upbringing in Beauce to his life experiences. He is the second oldest child and has two sisters, Brigitte and Caroline, and a brother, Gilles Jr. In his teens, Bernier played football as a member of the Condors, the team of the Séminaire St-Georges, that won the Bol d'Or in 1980 at the Olympic Stadium.

Bernier obtained a Bachelor of Commerce degree from the Université du Québec à Montréal, completed his law degree at the University of Ottawa and was called to the Quebec Bar in 1990, of which he is still a member.

== Early career ==
For 19 years, Bernier held positions in law, several financial and banking fields, such as working as a lawyer at McCarthy Tétrault, rising up to become branch manager at the National Bank, the office of the Securities Commission of Québec as Director of Corporate and International Relations, an adviser (handling fiscal reform) from 1996 to 1998 in the office of Bernard Landry—Quebec's finance minister and Deputy Premier of Quebec at the time—and Standard Life of Canada as the Vice-President of Corporate Affairs and Communication. He also served as Executive Vice-President of the Montreal Economic Institute, a Quebec free-market think tank, where he authored a book on tax reform.

== Political career ==
In 2005, Bernier became the Conservative candidate for Beauce in the 2006 federal election. Stephen Harper had asked Bernier's father to re-enter politics, and the latter suggested that his son should run instead. Bernier won 67 per cent of the vote, the largest majority for a Conservative politician outside Alberta. His ties to Beauce and his support for provincial jurisdictions (which was endorsed by former Social Credit party leader Fabien Roy) were factors in his win. Some political pundits believed Bernier's ideas led to the unexpected Conservative breakthrough in Quebec during the election.

=== In government (2006–2015) ===
==== Minister of Industry (2006–2007) ====
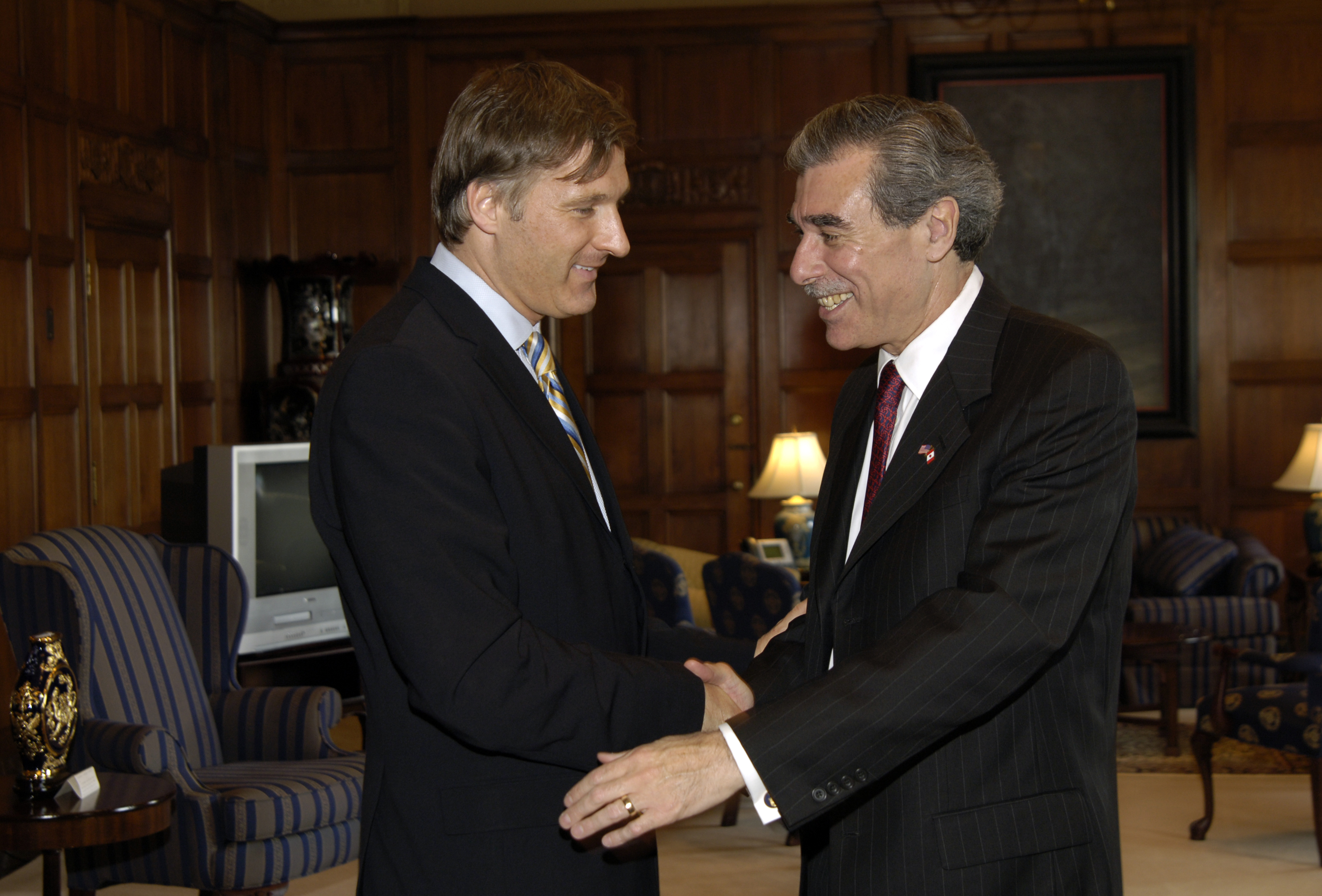
Bernier, serving as Canada's minister of industry, meets with US secretary of commerce, Carlos Gutierrez, June 2006

Bernier was a high-profile new MP from Quebec; on February 6, 2006, he was appointed Minister of Industry and minister responsible for Statistics Canada. As the Minister of Industry, he also served as the Registrar General. During his time as Industry Minister, Bernier started reformation of the telecommunications industry, particularly on local phone service. Professor Richard J. Schultz from McGill University lauded his attempt to deregulate the telecommunications industry, calling him "the best Industry Minister in 30 years, without challenge". James Cowan from Canadian Business, called Bernier's tenure "a golden age" for Canadian business policy.

==== Minister of Foreign Affairs (2007–2008) ====
On August 14, 2007, Bernier was appointed as Minister of Foreign Affairs, replacing Peter MacKay, who became the Minister of National Defence. During the beginning of his tenure, Bernier's personality and charm received praise among foreign dignitaries.

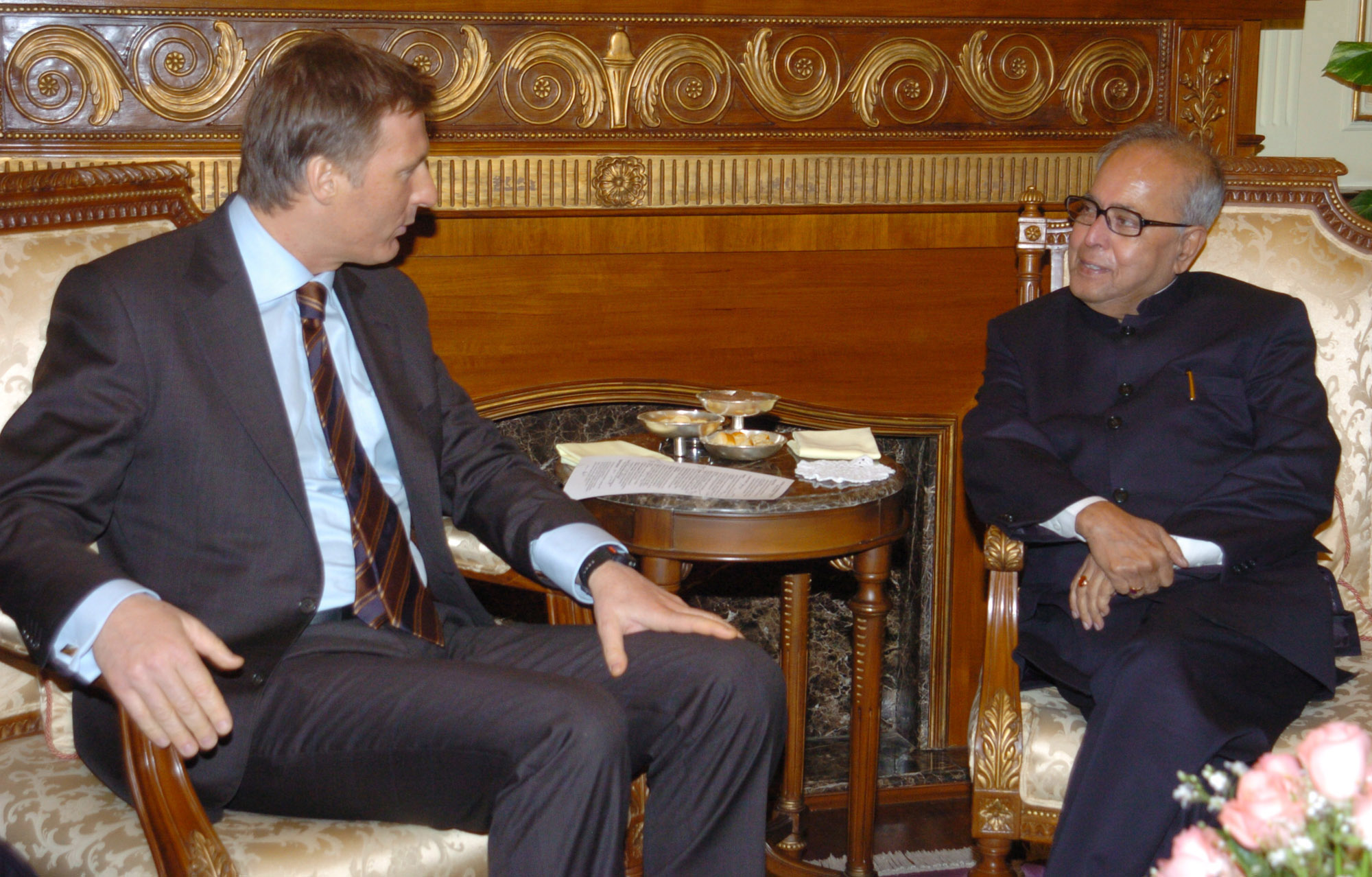
Bernier as Minister of Foreign Affairs with Pranab Mukherjee, Minister of External Affairs for India, 2008

In May 2008, news stories indicated that had Bernier had inadvertently left a confidential briefing book at the home of his girlfriend, Julie Couillard. While Prime Minister Stephen Harper originally defended Bernier, he ultimately accepted Bernier's resignation on May 26, 2008, saying, "It's only this error. It's a very serious error for any minister. The minister immediately recognized the gravity of that error." The incident made Bernier rethink his political career and he decided to avoid taking government information out of his parliamentary office in future.

Recalling his tenure as foreign minister, Bernier felt unsatisfied due to the Prime Minister's Office controlling the portfolio, making it harder for him to implement his views on Canadian foreign policy.

==== Backbench (2008–2011) ====
Six days before the 2008 election, Couillard released a book which was supposed to reveal Bernier's confidential opinions such as his personal objection to Canadian involvement in the Iraq War. The English version peaked at No. 6 on La Presse's bestseller list while the French version reached No. 5. However, the book was viewed negatively by some of Bernier's constituents. He was re-elected with 62 per cent of votes, and was made chair for the National Defense Select Committee.

In 2009, Bernier started a blog and spent the next four years travelling across Canada to discuss political issues. Bernier's speeches were criticized by Jean-Pierre Blackburn, Raymond Blanchard and Tom Mulcair, but praised by Andrew Coyne, Warren Kinsella, and André Pratte.

In September 2010, after Bernier's Quebec colleagues pushed for the federal government to invest $175 million in the Centre Vidéotron in Quebec City, Bernier opposed the proposed project and a feasibility study by Ernst & Young. He stated the proposal made little financial sense. The government later decided against the investment. He later stated that his colleagues were furious because they wanted to use the investment to "Buy votes".

It was rumoured that Conservative Party insiders wanted Bernier to become leader of the Action démocratique du Québec (ADQ) party if Stephen Harper's preferred choice, Mario Dumont, became Quebec lieutenant, and that Bernier was considering a leadership run. In 2009 there was a movement to draft Bernier for ADQ leadership. Bernier called the attention flattering, but declined to run.

==== Minister of State (2011–2015) ====
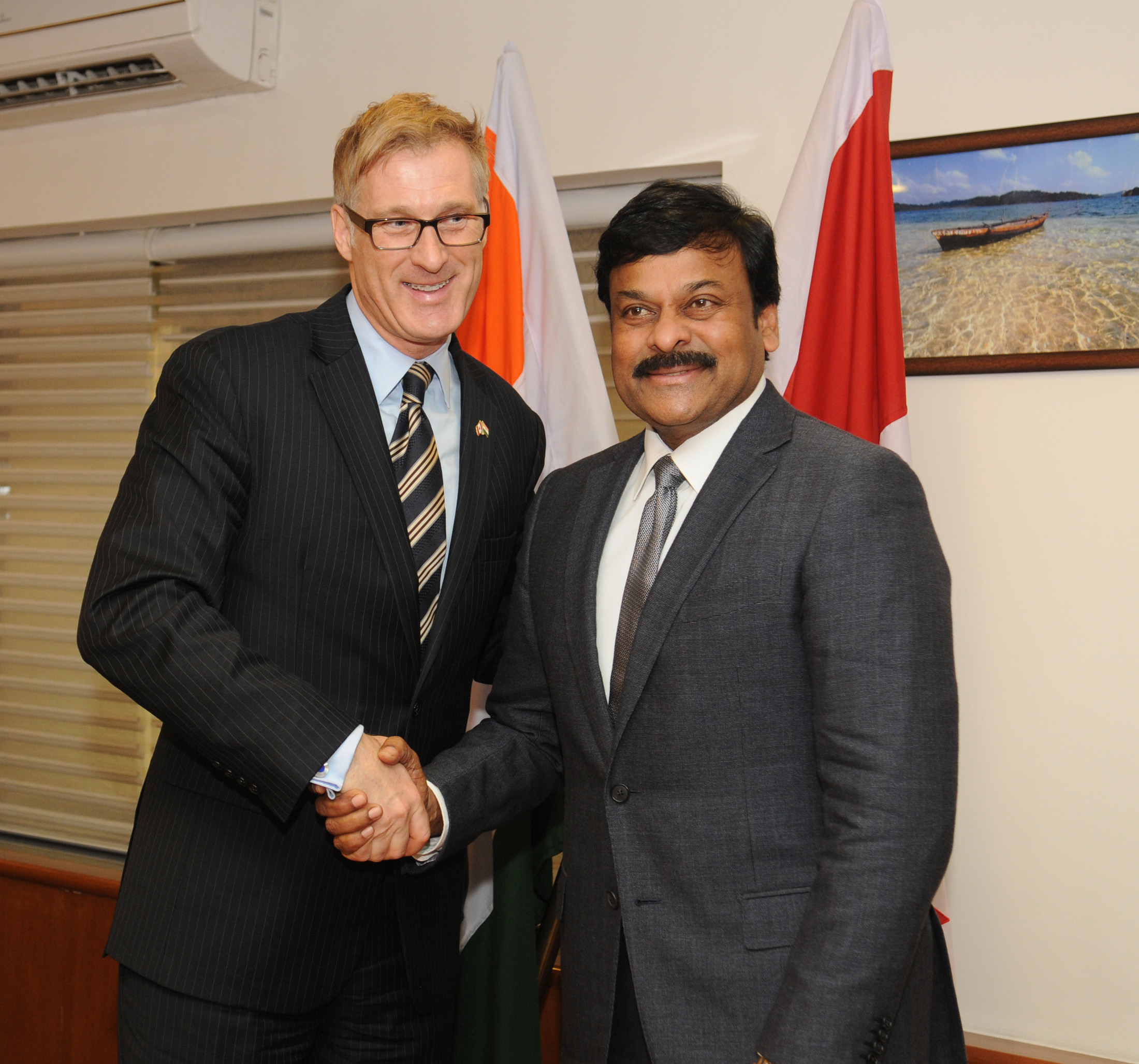
Bernier, serving as Canada's minister of state for tourism, meets his Indian counterpart, Chiranjeevi in New Delhi, February 2013

On May 18, 2011, Bernier was appointed as Minister of State (Small Business and Tourism), a junior ministerial post. Bernier did not enjoy being bound by the principle of cabinet solidarity, and disliked being named to a minor department, but accepted the role out of deference to his colleagues and to regain credibility via a return to the cabinet. Bernier later said he also accepted the position because he felt he did not accomplish enough in his career and expressed a desire to end the budget deficit.

His responsibilities were expanded with his appointment on July 15, 2013, as Minister of State (Small Business, Tourism, and Agriculture). During this time, he led the Red Tape Reduction Commission, which created a rule that for every regulation added another one has to be cut.

=== In opposition (2015–2016) ===
On November 20, 2015, Bernier was appointed by interim Conservative Leader Rona Ambrose as Critic for Economic Development and Innovation. He resigned on April 7, 2016, to run in the Conservative Party's leadership election.

In March 2016 Bernier introduced a motion to require Bombardier executives to explain, to the Industry Committee, the reasoning for the federal government to bail them out. Bernier argued Bombardier should restructure itself rather than seek public funds. Justin Trudeau's Liberal government blocked Bernier's motion.

At a conservative conference in March 2016, Bernier said that China has "less government and more freedom" than Canada; a video of the speech was later circulated by the Broadbent Institute's Press Progress. Bernier said that he was referring to economic freedom, not political freedom, and said that his remarks should not be construed to suggest that he supported Chinese dictatorship.

=== Conservative leadership campaign (2016–2017) ===
On April 7, 2016, Bernier filed his nomination to be a candidate in the 2017 Conservative Party of Canada leadership election, saying that he was running to promote his views and ideas on four principles: freedom, responsibility, fairness, and respect.

In May 2016, Bernier broke from his Conservative colleagues on supply management, the Canadian agricultural system in which a form of insurance is granted to farmers. He said that there was no way to reconcile the Canadian system with his "free-market principles".

After the Conservative Party decided to remove the traditional definition of marriage from their constitution, Bernier was one of few leadership contenders to march in the Toronto Pride Parade.

==== Policies ====
Bernier campaigned on smaller government, lower taxes, paying down the national debt, increasing investments, increase pipeline developments, and opening up markets. He proposed balancing the budget within two years, reduce the number of tax brackets from five to three, and increase basic exemption from $11,474 to $15,000 being paid by "boutique" tax credits. He proposed abolishing capital gains taxes, and lowering corporate taxes to 10% by getting rid of corporate welfare. Bernier also campaigned on phasing control of the Canada Health Transfer to the provinces for health care by replacing it with a health transfer point system.

He supported the decriminalization/legalization of marijuana, wants to allow MPs to vote their conscience, and get rid of omnibus bills. He opposed a "Canadian values" test on the basis that it is logistically ineffective to fight terrorism. He proposed abolishing the Canadian Radio-television Telecommunications Commission, privatizing Canada Post Corporation, phasing out supply management on dairy and poultry, and expanding free trade. He also proposed ending inter-provincial trade barriers.

He also wanted to "break" Quebec's maple syrup cartel and wanted to allow foreign ownership for the airline industry. He wants to "streamline the process for hiring specialized workers abroad", put more emphasis on economic immigration, "slightly reduce" family reunification class immigration, put more emphasis on privately sponsored refugees and fewer government sponsored, and reform temporary foreign worker programs. Bernier believes first nation communities need to be consulted before the Indian Act needs to be "abolished, or changed." He opposed federal control overreaching into other jurisdictions. He also campaigned on stricter foreign aid standards and phase out development aid.

==== Reactions from pundits ====
Nathan Giede of the Prince George Citizen wrote that Bernier was "the living reincarnation of all Laurier's good ideas and Dief the Chief's pan-Canadian optimism". In the Times Colonist, Bernier stated, "They can call me a fiscal conservative, they can call me a conservative who believes in freedom, they can call me reasonable libertarian, call me anything you want—call me Max, call me Maxime, call me 'Mad Max'." Occasionally, he displayed a sense of humour which helped him gain voters' attention. William Watson argued in the National Post that although some of Bernier's policies were reflective of the role "rugged individualism" played in Canada's past, and may have played a role in his loss, they could also affect Canada's future. Stanley Hartt, who was chief of staff to Prime Minister Brian Mulroney, found Scheer's victory not "stirring" and suggested that Scheer should have taken ideas from Bernier's economic platform, which Hartt praised.

==== Results ====
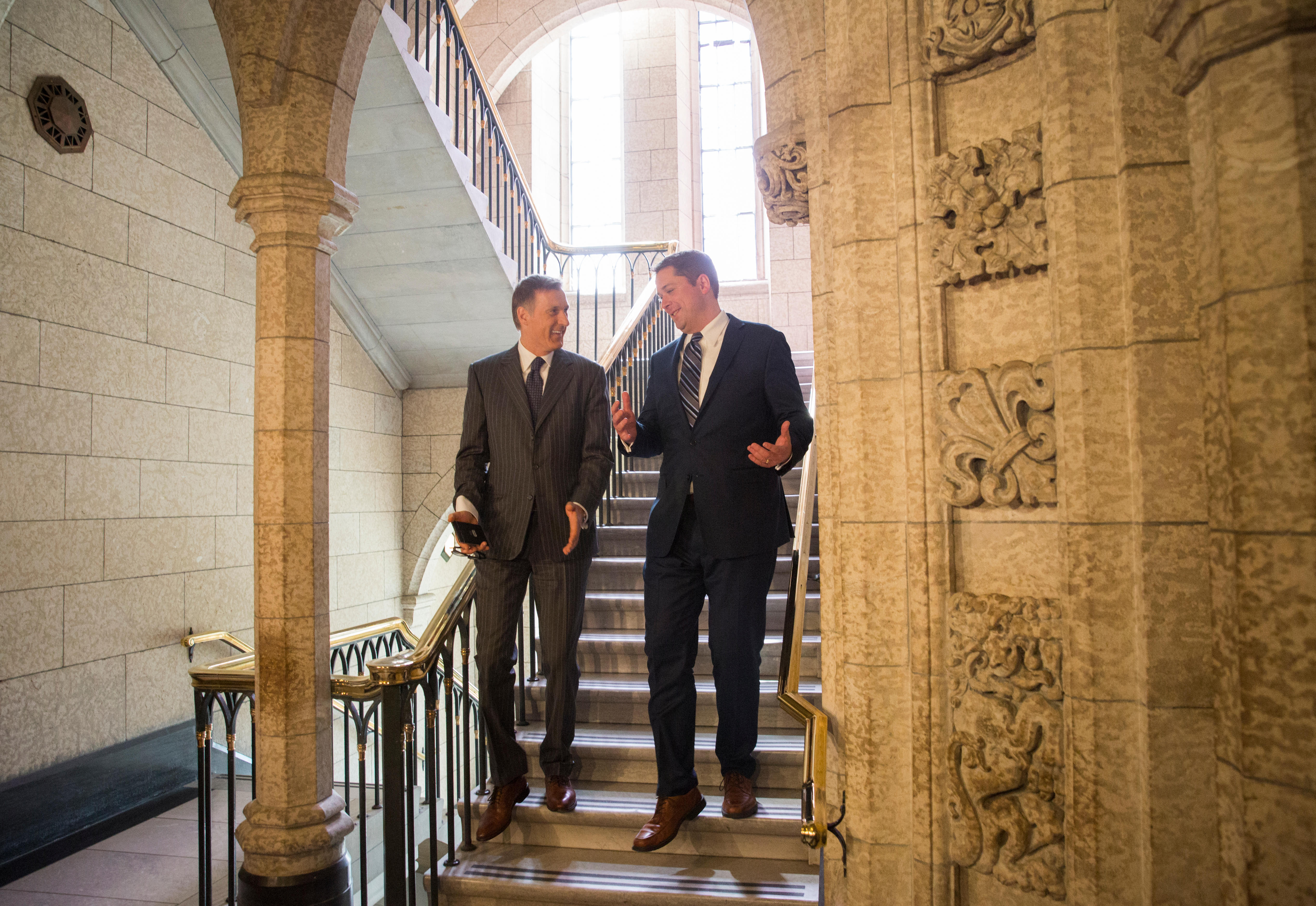
Bernier with Andrew Scheer in Ottawa, several days after the Conservative leadership election concluded, May 2017

Bernier achieved unexpectedly high levels of support, finishing a close second in the 13th and final round of voting on May 27, 2017, taking 49.05 per cent of the vote to Andrew Scheer's 50.95 per cent. A few days after the results, Michael Chong, another leadership candidate, argued that both his and Bernier's campaigns represented "real change, significant change" to the party but felt they wanted the status quo.

=== Post-leadership campaign (2017–2018) ===
On August 31, 2017, Bernier was re-appointed critic for Innovation, Science and Economic Development Canada by Andrew Scheer.

In 2018, media stories indicated that the 2015 Conservative campaign team knew about sexual assault allegations against former Conservative MP Rick Dykstra, on January 31, 2018, Bernier publicly demanded answers as he was heading towards a caucus meeting into the handling of the nomination as did Conservative MP Brad Trost, who tweeted in favour of Bernier statement. After the meetings, Scheer reversed his previous decision. and called for a third-party investigation.

Bernier intended to publish a book, Doing Politics Differently: My Vision for Canada. In April 2018, he pre-released a chapter on his publisher's website explaining why he made the abolition of Canada's supply management system an issue during the leadership campaign. The chapter referred to Quebec's dairy farmer lobby as "fake Conservatives" because they opposed his abolition of the supply management policy and supported Scheer's candidacy. However, in deference to his Conservative colleagues who saw the chapter as an attack on Scheer, Bernier agreed to postpone publication of the book indefinitely for the sake of party unity, while also saying that the book was not about his leadership campaign, but about important ideas. He later told the Toronto Star in an email that he defended his comments and that the book would someday be published.

On June 12, 2018, Scheer dismissed Bernier from the Official Opposition shadow cabinet, saying that Bernier had violated his pledge to delay publication of the book by posting the chapter on his website on June 5, after it had been removed from the publisher's website. Bernier denied that he broke the pledge, saying that the published excerpts had previously been publicly released on his publisher's website. During an At Issue panel after Bernier's demotion, Chantal Hebert was critical of Bernier decision to publish the chapter, Coyne found Bernier to be a victim of "a political setup" and Paul Wells thought Scheer was being "paranoid". On June 15, Bernier stated in an interview that he believed his stance on supply management was the real reason behind his dismissal, not his decision to post the chapter.

In a series of Twitter posts in August 2018, Bernier garnered attention for criticizing Prime Minister Trudeau's comments about "diversity is our strength". He later tweeted that naming a park in Winnipeg after Muhammad Ali Jinnah, was an example of "extreme multiculturalism". The tweets were broadly seen as divisive and inflammatory with calls for him to be reprimanded or removed from caucus such as John Ivison. However, Conservative leader Andrew Scheer stated Bernier "speaks for himself" amid calls for Bernier to be expelled from the party's caucus. Scheer later claimed that he did not use identity politics to gain support; which Bernier issued a series of tweets counter-arguing the point. Others such as Mathieu Bock-Côté, Lise Ravary and Neil Macdonald defended his comments by writing op-eds to counter arguing critics. While, Tom Walkom, Deborah Levy and Andre Valiquette found his critique common within mainstream Quebec. In his resignation speech, Bernier, had an issues with Scheer's response, and later clarified that he wanted to have a conversation about "ethnic division". When asked about his tweets by Question Period, he responded by stating "Instead of always promoting the diversity in our country, why not promote what unites us. That's the most important." Commentator Colby Cosh later wrote that Bernier had previously praised ethnic diversity, while also "objecting to its elevation to cult status".

=== Formation of People's Party of Canada (2018–2019) ===
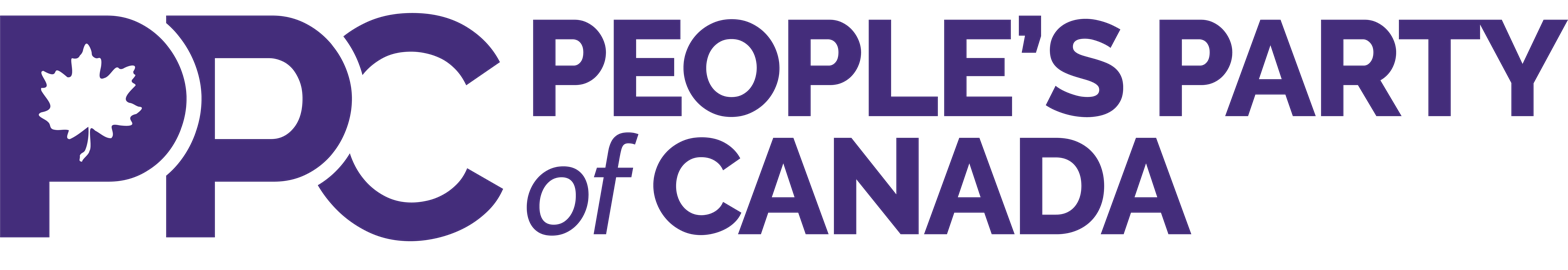
Logo of the PPC

On August 23, 2018, Bernier announced that he was leaving the Conservative Party with the intention of founding a new political party. He held a press conference at which he declared that the Conservative Party was "too intellectually and morally corrupt to be reformed", and was afraid to address important issues or articulate a coherent philosophy. Former Conservative prime ministers Stephen Harper and Brian Mulroney criticized his departure. Harper suggested that Bernier was a sore loser, while Mulroney said that Bernier's creation of a new party would split the vote and make it more likely that Trudeau's Liberals would win the 2019 election. Conversely, Bernier's decision was praised as courageous by columnist Christie Blatchford. In a National Post op-ed, Bernier stated that his establishment of a new party aimed to reverse what he called a "public choice dynamic" in Canadian politics, that led to vote-buying and "pandering" by the main political parties.

On September 14, 2018, Bernier announced the creation of the People's Party of Canada, saying the party would advocate for "smart populism", which he defined as policies based on principles of freedom, responsibility, fairness, and respect. Bernier positioned the People's Party to the right of the Conservative Party; the party has been variously described as conservative, libertarian, right-wing populist, classical liberal, far-right, and alt-right. In December 2018, some of its founding signatories were shown to have ties to American white nationalist and anti-immigrant groups. The party later told Le Devoir that they did not have enough resources to vet them at the beginning of the PPC's formation.

==== 2019 federal election ====
Campaigning in advance of the 2019 Canadian federal election, Bernier and his chief strategist, Martin Masse, aligned the People's Party with the anti-immigrant European New Right, calling for steep cuts to immigration to Canada and criticizing multiculturalism. His focus on issues like cutting immigration marked a change in his public profile that contrasted with his earlier focus (with the Conservative Party) on free-market economic libertarian stances such as telecom monopolies and deregulation. Bernier also proposed reductions in federal income tax, called for a reduction of the federal role in healthcare and the replacement of the Canada Health Transfer, and proposed the replacement of the Indian Act. He was the only leader of a party represented in the House of Commons to reject the scientific consensus on climate change. He said he would do "nothing" to deal with climate change, and that Canada should withdraw from the Paris Agreement on carbon emissions. On September 2, 2019, Bernier posted a series of tweets in which he called Swedish climate activist Greta Thunberg "mentally unstable". On September 4, after receiving widespread backlash, Bernier backpedaled.

Bernier and the PPC struggled in the election. Their affiliations with and support from the far-right were received negatively and the party never surpassed five per cent in national polls; Bernier himself fared poorly in debates and had the lowest net favourability rating among leaders, at −36. In his riding of Beauce, he faced Conservative candidate Richard Lehoux, a fourth-generation dairy farmer and past president of the Fédération Québécoise des Municipalités. He lost over 20 points compared to 2015, finishing with 28.3 per cent to Lehoux's 38.6 per cent, with the Bloc Québecois and Liberals finishing a distant third and fourth, respectively. Nationally, Bernier was the only PPC candidate to come within sight of being elected; no other candidate won more than six per cent of the vote, and the party as a whole won only 1.6 per cent of the popular vote. When Andrew Scheer resigned as Conservative Party leader in December, Bernier stated he would not be interested in returning.

After the election, he announced the YouTube series with the English title The Max Bernier Show and French title Les nouvelles de Maxime. In February 2020, he launched a lawsuit alleging defamation by Warren Kinsella for branding him a racist, on behalf of the Conservative Party, during the 2019 election. The lawsuit sought an admission of defamation and $325,000 in damages. In November 2021, the Ontario Superior Court of Justice dismissed the lawsuit, based on Ontario's Anti-SLAPP legislation, determining that it was not proven that the defamation concerns outweighed the importance of protecting free speech. Bernier was ordered in February 2022 to pay $132,000 in legal costs to Kinsella.

==== COVID-19 pandemic and 2021 election ====
Bernier announced his intention to run in a by-election when seats became vacant from the resignations of Bill Morneau and Michael Levitt over the summer of 2020. He confirmed his candidacy for Levitt's former Toronto riding of York Centre shortly after the date of the October 26, 2020, by-election was announced. He finished fourth with 642 votes (3.56 per cent).

Bernier was strongly critical of public health measures undertaken to combat the COVID-19 pandemic, having travelled to anti-lockdown protests throughout the country in 2021. On April 17, he spoke to several hundred people in Barrie, Ontario, despite being discouraged from doing so by the mayor and the area's city councillor. He and MPP Randy Hillier were both ticketed for their participation in a rally in Peterborough on April 24 for violating the Reopening Ontario Act. The day before, they had been told not to attend by mayor Dianne Therrien.

He attended a protest in Montreal on May 2. The crowd was large enough that it closed the mass vaccination clinic at the Olympic Stadium, where the protest began. He spoke along with Chris Sky in Regina, Saskatchewan, on May 8, and received a $2800 ticket. In Waterloo, Ontario, he and several other PPC candidates from neighbouring regions spoke at a rally on June 6. Waterloo's mayor, Dave Jaworsky, described their attendance as a political campaign rally that was "beyond shocking" during a pandemic. Bernier was arrested and ticketed by the Royal Canadian Mounted Police (RCMP) on June 11 in St-Pierre-Jolys, Manitoba, after attending a rally against COVID-19 restrictions, which was itself in violation of health restrictions. He paid $1000 bail, cancelled the remainder of his tour in Manitoba, and returned to Montreal the next day. In August, he said that he would not receive a COVID-19 vaccine.

Bernier led the PPC in the 2021 election and campaigned against vaccine mandates, vaccine passports and lockdowns. He ran in his old riding of Beauce for the election and again lost to Richard Lehoux. However, the PPC, despite not winning any seats, increased its share of the popular vote to nearly five per cent, triple of what it garnered in the 2019 election. The People's Party concluded its leadership review in December and he was confirmed and continued as leader.

==== Since the 2021 election ====
In July 2021, an affidavit filed in court alleged that People's Party of Canada leader Maxime Bernier made a racist remark about NDP leader Jagmeet Singh, saying Singh would "never get elected with that rag on his head." Bernier denied the accusation, stating that this was the only eyewitness account of him supposedly making a racist comment and accused political strategist Warren Kinsella of orchestrating a defamation campaign against him. In November 2021, Ontario Court dismissed Bernier's defamation lawsuit for failing an anti-SLAPP screening test.

Bernier supported the January–February 2022 Canada convoy protest in Ottawa and accused the federal and provincial governments of violating human rights as a result of their imposition of health measures during the pandemic. He also accused Prime Minister Justin Trudeau of 'colluding' with U.S. President Joe Biden on vaccine mandates.

Bernier announced on May 12, 2023, that he would run for MP in a by-election in Portage-Lisgar in Manitoba following the resignation of Candice Bergen. He finished in 2nd with 17.16% of the vote, losing the by-election to Conservative Party candidate Branden Leslie who won with 64.95% of the vote and a margin of almost 15,000 votes. Immediately following his defeat in the by-election, Bernier announced that he intended to run in Portage-Lisgar again at the next general election, before later announcing in 2025 that he would instead be a candidate in his old riding of Beauce. In the 2025 election, Bernier placed fourth in Beauce, winning only 3,628 votes (5.8%) and the PPC declined to less than 1% in the popular vote, with much of its support going to the Conservatives.

Bernier won a leadership review in July 2025, with 79.1% of the vote, a drop from his 2021 review numbers, when he garnered 95.6%. The Voter participation rate was 32.7% compared to 57% in 2021.

In August 2025, Bernier stated that he would support a third Quebec referendum, earlier stating his support for a Western independence referendum.

== Personal life ==
Bernier has two daughters. In 2010, he began a relationship with Catherine Letarte, a National Ballet School-trained ballerina, who worked for a women's shelter and as of 2017 runs a community centre for adults living with mental health issues. Bernier and Letarte married in the summer of 2019. Bernier is fond of quoting James M. Buchanan, Friedrich Hayek, and Henry Hazlitt and has been known as "Mad Max", the "Bloc-buster", or the "Albertan from Quebec" by his Ottawa colleagues.

In September 2013, Bernier trained for and ran an ultramarathon across his riding to raise funds for a local food bank. In 2014, Bernier participated in the Rodeo de Cochons after being challenged by a local mayor.

At the time of the 2025 Canadian federal election, he lived on Nuns' Island (L'Île-des-Sœurs).

== Works ==
- Bernier, Maxime (2003). Pour un taux d'imposition unique. VARIA. ISBN 978-2922245882.
- Doing Well and Doing Better: Health Services Provided to Canadian Forces Personnel with an Emphasis on Post-traumatic Stress Disorder : Report of the Standing Committee on National Defence
- Canada's Arctic Sovereignty: Report of the Standing Committee on National Defence
- Doing Politics Differently: My Vision for Canada – Chapter 5 "Live or die with supply management"

== Electoral history ==
2025 Canadian federal election: Beauce
Party	Candidate	Votes	%	±%	Expenditures
Conservative	Jason Groleau	37,604	59.71	+11.42	$56,895.72
Liberal	Maryelle-Henriette Doumbia	12,057	19.14	+6.83	$4,172.00
Bloc Québécois	Gaétan Mathieu	8,595	13.65	–1.52	$7,994.66
People's	Maxime Bernier	3,626	5.76	–12.43	$38,130.10
New Democratic	Annabelle Lafond-Poirier	1,100	1.75	–1.16	$3.75
Total valid votes/expense limit		62,982	98.49	+0.04	$134,948.19
Total rejected ballots		963	1.51	–0.04	
Turnout		63,945	71.94	+5.31	
Eligible voters (Note: Number of eligible voters does not include election day registrations.)		88,888			
Conservative hold		Swing		+2.30	
Source: Elections Canada

Canadian federal by-election, June 19, 2023: Portage—Lisgar Resignation of Candice Bergen
Party	Candidate	Votes	%	±%
Conservative	Branden Leslie	20,250	64.95	+12.43
People's	Max Bernier	5,352	17.16	−4.42
Liberal	Kerry Smith	2,666	8.55	−2.40
New Democratic	Lisa Tessier-Burch	2,208	7.08	−6.30
Green	Nicolas Geddert	704	2.26	–
Total valid votes		31,180	99.40	
Total rejected ballots		188	0.60	−0.15
Turnout		31,368	45.47	−20.77
Eligible voters		68,988		
Conservative hold		Swing		+8.42
Source: Elections Canada

2021 Canadian federal election: Beauce
Party	Candidate	Votes	%	±%	Expenditures
Conservative	Richard Lehoux	27,514	48.29	+9.70	$54,511.58
People's	Maxime Bernier	10,362	18.19	-10.18	$65,399.38
Bloc Québécois	Solange Thibodeau	8,644	15.17	+1.04	$4,385.30
Liberal	Philippe-Alexandre Langlois	7,018	12.32	+0.66	$5,569.50
New Democratic	François Jacques-Côté	1,654	2.90	-0.14	$24.86
Free	Chantale Giguère	1,096	1.92	–	$1,476.73
Green	Andrzej Wisniowski	486	0.85	-1.54	$0.00
Marijuana	Sébastien Tanguay	206	0.36	–	$0.00
Total valid votes/expense limit		56,980	98.45	–	$115,918.81
Total rejected ballots		895	1.55		
Turnout		57,875	66.63	-3.02	
Eligible voters		86,857			
Conservative hold		Swing		+9.94	
Source: Elections Canada

Canadian federal by-election, October 26, 2020: York Centre Resignation of Michael Levitt
Party	Candidate	Votes	%	±%	Expenditures
Liberal	Ya'ara Saks	8,253	45.70	−4.50	$96,612.31
Conservative	Julius Tiangson	7,552	41.82	+5.11	
New Democratic	Andrea Vásquez Jiménez	1,046	5.79	−4.05	$2,462.86
People's	Maxime Bernier	642	3.56	–	$27,917.42
Green	Sasha Zavarella	461	2.55	−0.70	$463.46
Independent	John "The Engineer" Turmel	104	0.58	–	—
Total valid votes/expense limit		18,058	100.00	–	$105,734.74
Total rejected ballots		166	0.91	−0.61	
Turnout		18,224	25.64	−36.12	
Eligible voters		70,434			
Liberal hold		Swing		−4.81	
Source:Elections Canada

2019 Canadian federal election: Beauce
Party	Candidate	Votes	%	±%	Expenditures
Conservative	Richard Lehoux	22,817	38.59	-20.39	$88,659.51
People's	Maxime Bernier	16,772	28.37	–	$92,268.96
Bloc Québécois	Guillaume Rodrigue	8,355	14.13	+6.68	$2,029.97
Liberal	Adam Veilleux	6,895	11.66	-10.56	$42,675.69
New Democratic	François Jacques-Côté	1,799	3.04	-6.64	$96.82
Green	Josiane Fortin	1,415	2.39	+0.7	none listed
Rhinoceros	Maxime Bernier	1,072	1.81	–	none listed
Total valid votes/expense limit		59,125	100.00		$112,590
Total rejected ballots		1,147	1.89	+0.64	
Turnout		59,125	68.48	+2.33	
Eligible voters		86,333			
Conservative hold		Swing		-24.38	
Maxime Bernier was the incumbent MP. After being elected as a Conservative in 2015, he founded the People's Party on September 14, 2018 and sat as their lone MP until dissolution.
Source: Elections Canada

2015 Canadian federal election
Party	Candidate	Votes	%	±%	Expenditures
Conservative	Maxime Bernier	32,910	58.89	+8.17	–
Liberal	Adam Veilleux	12,442	22.26	+11.27	–
New Democratic	Daniel Royer	5,443	9.74	−20.26	–
Bloc Québécois	Stéphane Trudel	4,144	7.42	+0.75	–
Green	Céline Brown MacDonald	943	1.69	+0.08	–
Total valid votes/Expense limit		55,882	100.0		$222,691.43
Total rejected ballots		712	1.25	0.02	
Turnout		56,594	66.15	+3.13	
Eligible voters		85,547			
Conservative hold		Swing		+14.22	
Source: Elections Canada

2011 Canadian federal election
Party	Candidate	Votes	%	±%	Expenditures
Conservative	Maxime Bernier	26,799	50.71	−11.70	$80,639.74
New Democratic	Serge Bergeron	15,831	29.95	+21.43	$1,165.17
Liberal	Claude Morin	5,833	11.04	+0.72	$53,133.79
Bloc Québécois	Sylvio Morin	3,535	6.69	−7.29	$19,711.99
Green	Etienne Doyon Lessard	852	1.61	−3.16	$2.00
Total valid votes/Expense limit		52,850	100.0		$90,992.37
Total rejected, unmarked and declined ballots		681	1.27	−0.30	
Turnout		53,531	63.02	+0.64	
Eligible voters		84,941			
Conservative hold		Swing		−16.56	

2008 Canadian federal election
Party	Candidate	Votes	%	±%	Expenditures
Conservative	Maxime Bernier	31,883	62.41	−4.61	$69,558.01
Bloc Québécois	André Côté	7,143	13.98	−5.99	$13,263,15
Liberal	René Roy	5,270	10.32	+2.40	$2,129.85
New Democratic	Véronique Poulin	4,352	8.52	+5.97	$2,575.32
Green	Nicolas Rochette	2,436	4.77	+2.23	none listed
Total valid votes/Expense limit		51,084	100.0		$87,470
Total rejected, unmarked and declined ballots		817	1.57	+0.75	
Turnout		51,901	62.38	−5.24	
Eligible voters		83,205			
Conservative hold		Swing		+0.69	

2006 Canadian federal election
Party	Candidate	Votes	%	±%	Expenditures
Conservative	Maxime Bernier	36,915	67.02	+49.93	$79,344.54
Bloc Québécois	Patrice Moore	10,997	19.97	−16.29	$66,069.90
Liberal	Jacques Lussier	4,364	7.92	−33.46	$54,809.07
New Democratic	Cléo Chartier	1,405	2.55	−0.50	$1,020.20
Green	Jean-Claude Roy	1,397	2.54	+0.31	$108.47
Total valid votes/Expense limit		55,078	100.0		$81,497
Total rejected, unmarked and declined ballots		454	0.82	−1.42	
Turnout		55,532	67.62	+8.12	
Eligible voters		82,123			
Conservative gain from Liberal		Swing		+33.11	

== Notes ==
Parliament of Canada
Preceded by Claude Drouin	Member of Parliament for Beauce; 2006–2019	Succeeded by Richard Lehoux
Political offices
Preceded by David Emerson	Minister of Industry; 2006–2007	Succeeded by Jim Prentice
Preceded by Peter MacKay	Minister of Foreign Affairs; 2007–2008	Succeeded by David Emerson
Preceded by Josée Verner	Minister responsible for La Francophonie; 2007–2008	Succeeded by Josée Verner
