= Jean-Paul Racine =

Canadian politician (1928–1988)

- Official 1966 portrait

Member of Parliament for Beauce
- In office March 1958 – June 1962
- Preceded by: Raoul Poulin
- Succeeded by: Gérard Perron

Member of Parliament for Beauce
- In office November 1965 – April 1968
- Preceded by: Gérard Perron
- Succeeded by: Romuald Rodrigue

Personal details
- Born: 8 February 1928 Saint-Honoré-de-Shenley, Quebec, Canada
- Died: 13 January 1988 (aged 59) Saint-Georges-Ouest, Quebec, Canada
- Party: Liberal
- Profession: Lumber merchant, manufacturer

Jean-Paul Racine (8 February 1928 – 13 January 1988) was a Liberal party member of the House of Commons of Canada. He was born in Saint-Honoré-de-Shenley, Quebec and became a lumber merchant and manufacturer by career.

He was first elected at the Beauce riding in the 1958 general election and served one term before being defeated there in 1962 by Gérard Perron of the Social Credit party. Racine was again defeated by Perron in 1963 but won the seat back in 1965 for one final Parliamentary term. In the 1968 election, he lost the seat to another Social Credit candidate, Romuald Rodrigue.
