= Christian Pozer =

Canadian politician

The Hon. Christian Henry Pozer
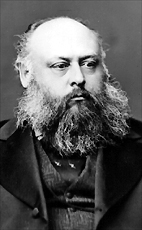

Senator for Lauzon, Quebec
- In office 20 September 1876 – 18 July 1884
- Appointed by: Alexander Mackenzie
- Preceded by: Alexandre-René Chaussegros de Léry
- Succeeded by: Joseph Bolduc

Member of the Canadian Parliament for Beauce
- In office 1867–1876
- Succeeded by: Joseph Bolduc

Member of the Legislative Assembly of Quebec for Beauce
- In office 1867–1874
- Succeeded by: François-Xavier Dulac

Personal details
- Born: 26 December 1835 manor-house in the seigneury of Aubert-Gallion in Beauce, Lower Canada
- Died: 18 July 1884 (aged 48) Saint-Georges, Quebec
- Party: Liberal
- Other political affiliations: Quebec Liberal Party

Christian Henry Pozer (26 December 1835 – 18 July 1884) was a Canadian lawyer and politician.

Born in St-Georges d'Aubert Gallion (now Saint-Georges), Beauce, Lower Canada (now Quebec), the son of William Pozer and Ann Milbourne, he was called to the Lower Canada bar in 1860.

In 1863, he ran as a Liberal for the Legislative Assembly of the Province of Canada in the riding of Beauce and was defeated. He was elected in 1867 and re-elected in 1871. He resigned in 1874.

At the same time, he was elected to the House of Commons of Canada for the riding of Beauce in 1867. A Liberal he was re-elected in 1872 and 1874.

He resigned from the House of Commons when he was appointed a senator in 1876 representing the senatorial division of Lauzon, Quebec. He died in office in 1884 and was buried in the Pozer Cemetery in St-Georges-de-Beauce.
