= Joseph Godbout =

Canadian politician

The Hon. Joseph Godbout
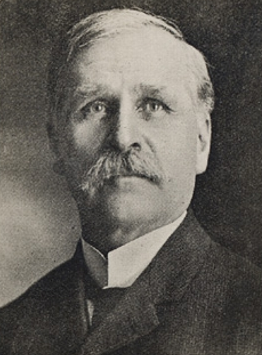

Senator for La Salle, Quebec
- In office April 4, 1901 – April 1, 1923
- Appointed by: Wilfrid Laurier
- Preceded by: Joseph Arthur Paquet
- Succeeded by: Jacques Bureau

Member of the Canadian Parliament for Beauce
- In office 1887–1901
- Preceded by: Thomas Linière Taschereau
- Succeeded by: Henri Sévérin Béland

Personal details
- Born: May 12, 1850 St-Vital de Lambton, Beauce County, Canada East
- Died: April 1, 1923 (aged 72)
- Party: Liberal
- Relations: Arthur Godbout, brother

Joseph Godbout (May 12, 1850 – April 1, 1923) was a physician and political figure in Quebec. He represented Beauce in the House of Commons of Canada from 1887 to 1901 as an independent Liberal and then Liberal member. He sat for La Salle division in the Senate of Canada from 1901 to 1923.

He was born in St-Vital de Lambton, Beauce County, Canada East, the son of Joseph Godbout. Godbout was educated at the Séminaire de Quebec and the Université Laval. He was married twice: to Rachel Audet in 1878 and, after his first wife's death, to Hermine Fauteux (née St-Pierre). Godbout was mayor of St-François in 1898. He was named to the Senate by Sir Wilfrid Laurier on April 4, 1901. Godbout died in office at the age of 72.

His step-grandson Gaspard Fauteux also served as a member of the House of Commons.
