= Raoul Poulin =

Canadian politician

MLA for Beauce
- In office October 7, 1936 – November 12, 1936
- Preceded by: Vital Cliche
- Succeeded by: Joseph-Émile Perron

Member of the Canadian Parliament for Beauce
- In office 1949–1958
- Preceded by: Ludger Dionne
- Succeeded by: Jean-Paul Racine

Personal details
- Born: February 8, 1900 Saint-Martin, Quebec
- Died: October 23, 1975 (aged 75)
- Party: Independent
- Occupation: Physician

Raoul Poulin (February 8, 1900 – October 23, 1975) was a Canadian politician, who represented the electoral district of Beauce in the House of Commons of Canada from 1949 to 1958. He was elected, and served the entirety of his term, as an independent MP.

He first entered politics as a Union Nationale member of the Legislative Assembly of Quebec, winning the provincial district of Beauce in the 1936 provincial election, but resigned less than two months into his term.

His brother, Georges-Octave Poulin, also later represented Beauce in the Legislative Assembly of Quebec.
