= Richard Lehoux =

Canadian politician

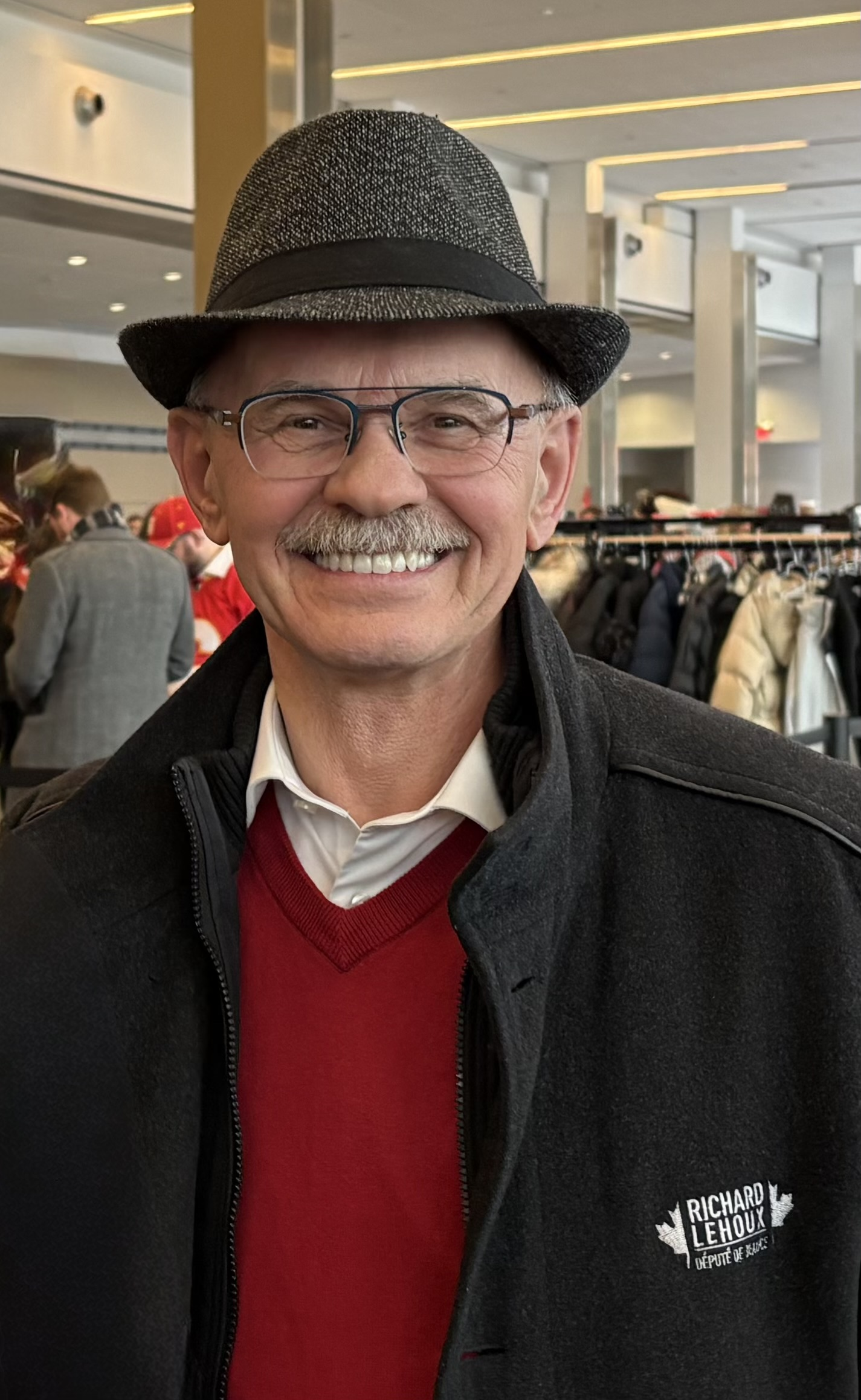
- Lehoux in 2025

Member of Parliament for Beauce
- In office October 21, 2019 – March 23, 2025
- Preceded by: Maxime Bernier
- Succeeded by: Jason Groleau

Mayor of Saint-Elzéar
- In office November 1, 1998 – November 4, 2017
- Succeeded by: Carl Marcoux

Personal details
- Born: 1956 (age 69–70)
- Party: Conservative
- Other political affiliations: Quebec Liberal (2008)
- Spouse: Ginette Lessard

Richard Lehoux (born 1956) is a Canadian politician who served as the member of Parliament (MP) for Beauce from 2019 until 2025, as a member of the Conservative Party. Prior to his election to the House of Commons, Lehoux was the mayor of Saint-Elzear from 1998 to 2017 and the reeve of Nouvelle-Beauce Regional County Municipality from 2000 to 2017.

== Personal and professional life ==
Lehoux was born in 1956. His family has been in Beauce for eight generations. His great-grandfather served as mayor of Saint-Elzear from 1898 to 1902, and he is a fourth-generation dairy farmer.

== Political career ==
=== Municipal politics ===
==== Mayor of Saint-Elzéar and Reeve of Nouvelle-Beauce RCM ====
Lehoux was the mayor of Saint-Elzéar, Quebec in the Chaudière-Appalaches region from 1998 to 2017, and the reeve of Nouvelle-Beauce RCM from 2000 to 2017.

==== Fédération québécoise des municipalités ====
Lehoux was a member of the Fédération québécoise des municipalités (FQM) from 2001 to 2017. He was the vice president from 2010 to 2014 and briefly served as interim president in 2012. He was elected as the FQM's president in 2014 and held the role until 2017.

When the FQM founded the Mutuelle des municipalités du Québec (MMQ) in 2003, Lehoux served as vice president. He would also serve as MMQ president from 2017 to 2018.

=== Federal politics ===
Lehoux retired from municipal politics in 2017 to return to his dairy farm, but returned to politics in November 2018 as the Conservative candidate for the 2019 Canadian federal election in the Beauce riding, with the support (amongst others) of party leader Andrew Scheer.

Lehoux was elected to Parliament following the 2019 election, unseating incumbent Maxime Bernier, who formerly held the seat for the Conservatives, but resigned to form the libertarian-right People's Party of Canada (PPC). He was re-elected in the 2021 election.

On March 21, 2025, Lehoux announced that he would not run for re-election in the 2025 Canadian federal election.

== Electoral record ==
2021 Canadian federal election: Beauce
Party	Candidate	Votes	%	±%	Expenditures
Conservative	Richard Lehoux	27,514	48.29	+9.70	$54,511.58
People's	Maxime Bernier	10,362	18.19	-10.18	$65,399.38
Bloc Québécois	Solange Thibodeau	8,644	15.17	+1.04	$4,385.30
Liberal	Philippe-Alexandre Langlois	7,018	12.32	+0.66	$5,569.50
New Democratic	François Jacques-Côté	1,654	2.90	-0.14	$24.86
Free	Chantale Giguère	1,096	1.92	–	$1,476.73
Green	Andrzej Wisniowski	486	0.85	-1.54	$0.00
Marijuana	Sébastien Tanguay	206	0.36	–	$0.00
Total valid votes/expense limit		56,980	98.45	–	$115,918.81
Total rejected ballots		895	1.55		
Turnout		57,875	66.63	-3.02	
Eligible voters		86,857			
Conservative hold		Swing		+9.94	
Source: Elections Canada

2019 Canadian federal election: Beauce
Party	Candidate	Votes	%	±%	Expenditures
Conservative	Richard Lehoux	22,817	38.59	-20.39	$88,659.51
People's	Maxime Bernier	16,772	28.37	–	$92,268.96
Bloc Québécois	Guillaume Rodrigue	8,355	14.13	+6.68	$2,029.97
Liberal	Adam Veilleux	6,895	11.66	-10.56	$42,675.69
New Democratic	François Jacques-Côté	1,799	3.04	-6.64	$96.82
Green	Josiane Fortin	1,415	2.39	+0.7	none listed
Rhinoceros	Maxime Bernier	1,072	1.81	–	none listed
Total valid votes/expense limit		59,125	100.00		$112,590
Total rejected ballots		1,147	1.89	+0.64	
Turnout		59,125	68.48	+2.33	
Eligible voters		86,333			
Conservative hold		Swing		–	
Maxime Bernier was the incumbent MP. After being elected as a Conservative in 2015, he founded the People's Party on September 14, 2018 and sat as their lone MP until dissolution.
Source: Elections Canada

2008 Quebec general election: Beauce-Nord
Party	Candidate	Votes	%	±%
Action démocratique	Janvier Grondin	12,633	49.92	
Liberal	Richard Lehoux	9,612	37.98	
Parti Québécois	Mireille Mercier-Roy	2,297	9.08	
Green	Francis Paré	384	1.52	–
Québec solidaire	Emilie Guimond-Bélanger	264	1.04	
Independent	Benoît Roy	117	0.46	
