= François-Xavier Dulac =

Canadian politician

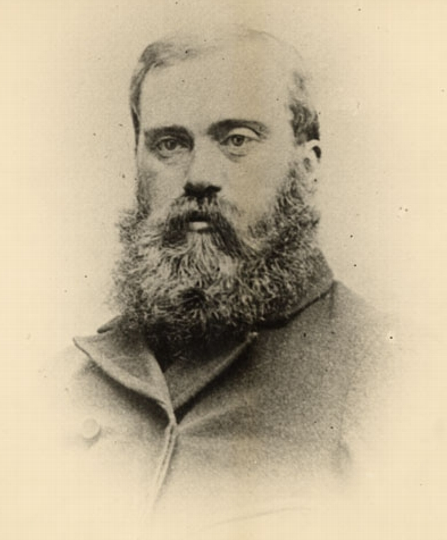

Member of the Legislative Assembly of Quebec for Beauce
- In office 1874–1878
- Preceded by: Christian Pozer
- Succeeded by: Joseph Poirier

Personal details
- Born: July 26, 1841 Saint-Georges de Beauce, Canada East
- Died: July 11, 1890 (aged 48) Saint-Georges de Beauce, Quebec
- Party: Conservative

François-Xavier Dulac (July 26, 1841 – July 11, 1890) was a farmer, merchant and political figure in Quebec. He represented Beauce in the Legislative Assembly of Quebec from 1874 to 1878 as a Conservative. His name also appears as François-Xavier Bonhomme dit Dulac.

He was born in Saint-Georges de Beauce, Canada East, the son of Augustin Bonhomme dit Dulac and Marie Caron. In 1864, he married Flavie Veilleux. Dulac was mayor of Aubert-Gallion (later Saint-Georges) from 1870 to 1872 and warden for Beauce County in 1870. He was first elected to the legislative assembly in an 1874 by-election held after Christian Pozer resigned after it became illegal to hold seats in both the House of Commons and the Quebec assembly. He was unsuccessful in bids for reelection in 1878 and 1886. Dulac also ran unsuccessfully as an independent candidate for a seat in the House of Commons in 1887. He died in Saint-Georges at the age of 48.
