= My Story (Couillard book) =

2008 memoir by Julie Couillard

- First edition cover
- Author: Julie Couillard
- Language: English, French
- Genre: Non-fiction, memoir
- Publisher: McClelland & Stewart, Editions de l'Homme
- Publication date: October 6, 2008
- Publication place: Canada
- Media type: Print (Hardcover, Trade Paperback)
- Pages: 320
- ISBN: 978-0-7710-2292-0

My Story (or Mon histoire) is a tell-all memoir by Canadian Julie Couillard. It was first written in French, then during summer 2008, translated into English. Both versions were published across Canada in October 2008.

Couillard first appeared in the national media when she then dated Maxime Bernier, who at that time was Minister of Foreign Affairs. The incident began in May 2008 over a NATO-related dossier which Bernier forgot at Couillard's house.

Intended to be released on October 14, 2008, the book's release date was moved forward when that same day was selected for the Canadian federal election. Bernier dismissed the allegations against him in the book as ridiculous and the book faced negative publicity in Beauce, Bernier's riding. The English version peaked at No. 6 on La Presse's bestseller list while the French version reached No. 5. Critics found Couillard's story self-righteous and sometimes conveniently vague, but noted that it provided a unique view into the government's inner circle. Others felt that Couillard was using the book to hurt Bernier. Though My Story was released eight days before the election, Bernier was re-elected.

== Background ==
Julie Couillard began dating Conservative Party of Canada Member of Parliament Maxime Bernier in April 2007. The media started covering her in August, when she wore a revealing dress to Bernier's swearing-in ceremony for his new position as Minister of Foreign Affairs. The couple had first met at a restaurant dinner with business associates. Couillard and Bernier dated until December 2007, but continued seeing each other until April 2008. Bernier later revealed to his constituents that he ended their relationship after the RCMP revealed Couillard's past to him, which he was unaware of. Historically, these types of incidents were not unique. However, their relationship became the subject of a political scandal, which brought about intense media attention. As the scandal unfolded, Couillard decided to write an autobiography to tell her side of the story. She formally signed a contract in July with publishers, McClelland & Stewart; and with the help of journalist, Serge Demers, a ghostwriter, she wrote My Story in French within a few months. The publisher translated the text into English.

== Bernier–Couillard affair ==
Bernier was elected as a Conservative candidate in Quebec and became the Minister of Industry before being reassigned to the Ministry of Foreign Affairs in August 2007. Though his relationship with Couillard had ended in December, they continued with occasional trysts. In April 2008, as Bernier departed Couillard's home, he left a briefing book from the 2008 Bucharest summit. Couillard put the briefcase containing the notes labelled confidential aside and forgot about them until May when she returned them to a foreign affairs office. Significant discussion about the affair was then voiced in both the House of Commons of Canada and the Standing Committee on Public Safety and National Security as to whether the affair was a threat to national security. However, Prime Minister of Canada, Stephen Harper stated that their relationship was a private matter and dismissed it as a security threat.

Journalist Chantal Hébert pointed out Couillard never had any criminal record and was not charged with criminal activity. Hébert decried Denis Coderre and Gilles Duceppe for political opportunism and challenged their genuineness, suggesting they were more focused on their poll numbers in Quebec. Jack Granatstein stated that some were "puzzled" about the incident since the secrets in the notes were considered the "run-of-the-mill kind". Bernier pointed out that the civil servant determines what parts of a document are classified and that releasing it would not cause any significant injury to national interest A former staffer for Bernier was critical of how the media handled Bernier's tenure with Foreign Affairs calling the reporting and Bernier's portrayal "over sensationalized". An internal government report dated 16 July 2008 conducted by the Department of Foreign Affairs found that disclosure of the notes would not have caused significant injury to Canadian interests.

The media revealed she had been convinced by a Kevlar Group to lobby Bernier in order to gain support for a $300-million lease by transferring 700 federal employees to a Kevlar building project in Quebec City.

It was expected that Bernier would be demoted, but he accepted blame for the incident and offered his resignation as Minister of Foreign Affairs to Prime Minister Stephen Harper, who accepted. A day later Couillard's interview aired on TVA. According to Couillard, Bernier's response to the subsequent media coverage made her feel betrayed and abandoned. However, a friend told Jane Taber that Bernier had plans to resign immediately but was told to wait it out by the government who did not want him step down just before the Prime Minister was about to go to Europe or, blow up while the Prime Minister was on the plane.

== Content ==
The book begins as an autobiography. Couillard was born in the late-1960s in the Montreal district of Ville-Émard; she then moved to the suburb of Lorraine when she was four. Her parents often fought as her mother believed that her husband was unfaithful; the family incurred financial problems when Couillard's father changed careers. At age 12, Couillard was diagnosed with epilepsy. At age 17, she bought several properties with a boyfriend. They lived together briefly before breaking up and selling the properties. Couillard became a friend, then lover, of Gilles Giguère, a money lender who was associated with the controversial motorcycle club Hells Angels. In 1996, after the police raided Giguère's apartment and (according to Couillard) threatened him, Giguère became sullen and withdrawn: the police had charged him with conspiracy to commit murder. But two months later, they let the charge drop. Giguère was soon murdered.

In 1997, Couillard met Stéphane Sirois, a reputed "enforcer", drug dealer and member of the Rockers, a Hells Angels affiliate club. They married. However, financial problems interfered with their relationship and Couillard cheated on Sirois with a man named Bruno. During their divorce, Sirois became an informant for the police and entered a witness protection program. Couillard became pregnant with Bruno's child, and had an abortion; they subsequently separated. Following further personal, financial problems, Couillard declared bankruptcy in 2002. She then began an affair with a married man who abandoned her while they visited Venice, Italy.

When she returned to Canada, Couillard launched an airport security firm, Integrated Global Solutions (it was reported that Canadian Air Transport Security Authority offered two services to them), along with an auto-leasing business. She began to date Bernard Coté, an aide to federal Minister of Public Works, Michael Fortier. Couillard then introduced Coté to Philippe Morin of the Kevlar Group, a real estate company which signed a deal with the federal government to acquire land from Kevlar. She also pointed to Morin, René Bellerive, and Éric Boyko, who set up a meeting with Bernier as a way to push a deal with the federal government and Kevlar.

In April 2007, while attending a Conservative Party of Canada fundraising affair, Couillard was asked to consider being a candidate for the party. Bernier registered Couillard as his designated traveling companion with the Ministry of Foreign Affairs in order for Couillard to accompany him on government business. Couillard pointed out that former President George W. Bush was impressed when he brought her around.

In her book, Couillard accused Bernier of being intellectually lazy, preoccupied with his appearance, and concerned that he appears gay. She writes that Bernier privately criticised Prime Minister Stephen Harper's eating habits, his physique, whispered negative comments to Couillard about members of his electoral district and that he did not own a laptop, frequently using her house and home computer as a second office . She adds that Bernier thought about making a leadership run after hearing rumours that the Prime Minister wasn't going to stay long and that Bernier opposed the invasion of Iraq contrary to his party's stance and had issues with the Afghanistan War. During his time as Industry Minister, she revealed that a loyal staffer to Bernier had disrespected the authority of the PMO, who wanted him to be removed. Couillard also mentions that she never talked to Bernier about the Kevlar deal, but that Bernier used his position in the Treasury Board to prevent the deal from happening over concerns of conflict of interests.

Couillard goes on to describe the NATO incident and the ensuing media coverage from her perspective.

== Publication and reception ==
The original publication date for the book was October 14, 2008. After the Canadian federal election was called and set for that day the book's release was rescheduled to October 6, eight days before the election, in which Bernier was seeking re-election. The English version was published as a hardcover by McClelland & Stewart while the French version was released by Montreal publishers, Les Editions de l'Homme, as a trade paperback. According to La Presse, 17,000 copies were printed; 5,000 sold in the first two weeks. In the Montreal market, the book was listed on the bestseller list at No. 6 for two weeks while the French version spent one week at No. 5.

In response to the book, Bernier dismissed the contents as "soap-opera politics and completely ridiculous". Writer William Johnson said the story unfolds like pulp fiction or a soap opera and compared Couillard to the abused heroine in Justine who does not learn from her calamities. Charlie Gillis from Macleans blogged his reading of the book and noted that it felt like Couillard had a desire to hurt Bernier.

The book faced negative publicity in Beauce, Bernier's riding. René Roy, a 26-year-old Liberal candidate in a debate suggested that Bernier is homosexual which faced backlash from Bernier's constituents.

Bernard Landry was critical of Couiilard over her accusation of Bernier's "intellectual laziness" stating, "He was kind, charming. He was not a friend, but he was a collaborator I liked".

=== Aftermath ===
Bernier apologised to family members who were negatively impacted by the incident. In addition, he explained that it made him rethink his political career and avoid taking government information out of his parliamentary office. Bernier went on to win his election in Beauce with 62% of the vote and the Conservatives won re-election. Bernier was not appointed to a cabinet position, even though it had been rumoured. Bernier eventually returned to the cabinet following the 2011 election, in which the Conservatives won a majority government, as Minister of State for Small Business and Tourism.

The Royal Canadian Mounted Police (RCMP) launched investigations into how Couillard obtained the secret documents, whether Couillard's mother was offered a patronage appointment by a Conservative Party official to the Immigration and Refugee Board of Canada, and whether there was influence peddling during the land sale between the Kevlar Group and Public Works. Coté resigned after the deal was considered a conflict of interest. Bernier continued to sit as an MP until 2019 and was runner up for the 2017 Conservative Party leadership.

In 2017, the Canadian Broadcasting Corporation reported that Bernier has plans to release a book about his political career. When asked about Couillard, he stated that she won't receive nearly as much attention in his book and that "It's all behind me. I'll have maybe a paragraph about that. Nothing new."
