= Jean Blanchet (Quebec politician) =

Canadian politician

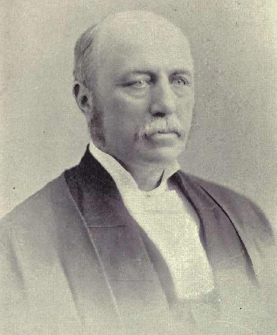

Member of the Legislative Assembly of Quebec for Beauce
- In office 1881–1892
- Preceded by: Joseph Poirier
- Succeeded by: Joseph Poirier

Personal details
- Born: February 10, 1843 Saint-François-de-Beauce, Canada East
- Died: December 11, 1908 (aged 65) Quebec City, Quebec

Hon. Jean Gervais Protais Blanchet (February 10, 1843 – December 11, 1908) was the second eldest of eleven children of Cyprien Blanchet, notary public of St. Francois, Beauce and his wife, Marie Gosselin. He was a descendant of one of Quebec’s oldest families who settled in Quebec in 1667. Born in St. Gervais, he was educated at Nicolet College. He entered Laval University to study law and was called to the Bar of Lower Canada in 1863. He practised law with the firm of Henri-Elzear Taschereau. He was created a Q.C. by the government of Quebec in 1876 and had the same honour conferred on him by the Canadian government in 1880. He was elected and served as batonnier of the Quebec section of the Bar from 1889-1891 and batonnier-general of the province 1890-1891.

He was defeated in his first try at politics losing the Beauce seat in the federal election of 1872. He represented the riding of Beauce from 1881 to 1892. Acclaimed as a Conservative member of the National Assembly in 1881, he resigned his position when we was appointed to the Cabinet on July 31, 1882. Acclaimed in a by-election of August 14, 1882, he was re-elected in 1886 and 1890. He held the office of Provincial Secretary and Registrar in the Mousseau, Ross and Taillon administrations. He served as Conservative leader of the Opposition in the Legislative Assembly of Quebec from 1890 to 1891. He became leader of the Opposition after Conservative leader Louis-Olivier Taillon failed to win a seat in losing the 1890 Quebec election. He took part in all the important debates, including the provincial autonomy question, the exercise of the veto power and the Riel affair. He was one of the commissioners selected in 1887 to revise the statute law of the province. He resigned his seat and the post of leader of the Opposition when he was appointed a judge of the Court of Queen's Bench on September 19, 1891. He received the honorary degree of LL.B from Laval University in 1891.

Later that same year, the Liberal government of Honoré Mercier was deposed by the Lieutenant Governor and the Conservative Charles-Eugène Boucher de Boucherville became Premier.

He was a member of the Roman Catholic Church. He married Jeanie, youngest daughter of Gen. Silas Seymour of New York, on August 5, 1878 at the Anglican Cathedral in Quebec. The couple had three children: Seymour, Florence (Mrs. Norman Craik Ogilvie, and by her second marriage, Mrs. Herbert A. Laurie), and Maurice.

He was an honorary member of the Historical Society of Montreal, of L'Athénée Louisianais and of the Geological Society of Bordeaux, France. He was for many years president of the Asbestos Mining and Manufacturing Society and of the Artisans’ Permanent Building Society. He was a member of the Garrison Club, the Union Club and the St. James Club. He is buried in the cemetery of Saint–Francois in Beauceville.

== See also ==
- Politics of Quebec
- List of Quebec general elections
- List of Quebec leaders of the Opposition
- Timeline of Quebec history

Political offices
Preceded by Étienne-Théodore Pâquet	Provincial Secretary of Quebec; 1882-1887	Succeeded by Charles-Antoine-Ernest Gagnon
Preceded by Louis-Olivier Taillon	Leader of the Official Opposition; 1890-1891	Succeeded by Félix-Gabriel Marchand
