= Claude Drouin =

Canadian politician

The Honourable Claude Drouin PC

Member of Parliament for Beauce
- In office June 2, 1997 – January 23, 2006
- Preceded by: Gilles Bernier
- Succeeded by: Maxime Bernier

Personal details
- Born: May 26, 1956 (age 69) Frampton, Quebec, Canada

Claude Drouin PC (born May 26, 1956) is a former Canadian politician. He was the member of Parliament representing the riding of Beauce from 1997 to 2006 and was also the Parliamentary Secretary to Prime Minister Paul Martin with special emphasis on Rural Communities.

Born in Frampton, Quebec, Canada, Drouin is a former foreman and political advisor. He was elected as an MP for the riding of Beauce as a candidate for the Liberal Party of Canada in the 1997 election. He is a former member of the Canadian Air Force.

26th Canadian Ministry (1993–2003) – Cabinet of Jean Chrétien
Sub-Cabinet Post
| Predecessor | Title | Successor |
|---|---|---|
| Martin Cauchon | Secretary of State (Economic Development Agency of Canada for the Regions of Quebec) (2002–2003) | |
Other offices
| Preceded by Gilles Bernier, Independent | Member of Parliament for Beauce; 1997-2006 | Succeeded by Maxime Bernier, Conservative |
