= Yves Caron =

Canadian politician (1937–2023)

Member of Parliament for Beauce
- In office October 1972 – March 1979

Personal details
- Born: September 27, 1937 Saint-Georges, Quebec, Canada
- Died: August 28, 2023 (aged 85)
- Party: Liberal
- Profession: accounting clerk, alcohol distributor, salesperson

Yves Caron (September 27, 1937 – August 28, 2023) was a Liberal party member of the House of Commons of Canada. He was an accounting clerk, alcohol distributor and salesperson by career.

Born in Saint-Georges, Quebec, Caron was first elected at the Beauce riding in the 1972 general election. He was re-elected in the 1974 federal election but was defeated in the 1979 election by Fabien Roy of the Social Credit party. He served in the 29th and 30th Parliaments.

After leaving the House of Commons, Caron was an interim War Veterans Allowances Board member. He also received two consecutive ten-year appointments to the Canadian Pension Commission in 1984.
