= Joseph-Émile Perron =

Canadian politician

Member of the Legislative Assembly of Quebec for Beauce
- In office 1937–1939
- Preceded by: Raoul Poulin
- Succeeded by: Henri-René Renault

Personal details
- Born: October 26, 1893 Sacré-Coeur-de-Jésus (East Broughton), Quebec
- Died: December 19, 1979 (aged 86) Montreal, Quebec
- Party: Union Nationale
- Children: Clément Perron

Joseph-Émile Perron (October 26, 1893 – December 19, 1979) was a Canadian provincial politician. He was the Union Nationale member of the Legislative Assembly of Quebec for Beauce from 1937 to 1939. He was also mayor of East Broughton Station from 1937 to 1939. He served in the Canadian Expeditionary Force during World War I and was awarded the Croix de Guerre.
