= Beauce (provincial electoral district) =

Coordinates: 46.192°N 70.771°W

Quebec electoral district

Defunct provincial electoral district
- Legislature: National Assembly of Quebec
- District created: 1867
- District abolished: 1972
- First contested: 1867
- Last contested: 1970

Beauce (French pronunciation: [bos]) was a former provincial electoral district in the Chaudière-Appalaches and Estrie regions of Quebec, Canada. It elected members to the National Assembly of Quebec (earlier known as the Legislative Assembly of Quebec).

It was created for the 1867 election, and electoral districts of that name existed even earlier: see Beauce (Province of Canada electoral district) and Beauce (Lower Canada). Its final election was in 1970. It disappeared in the 1973 election and its successor electoral districts were Beauce-Nord and Beauce-Sud.

== Members of the Legislative Assembly / National Assembly ==
- Christian Henry Pozer, Liberal (1867–1874)
- François-Xavier Dulac, Conservative Party (1874–1878)
- Joseph Poirier, Liberal (1878–1881)
- Jean Blanchet, Conservative Party (1881–1892)
- Joseph Poirier, Conservative Party (1892–1897)
- Henri Sévérin Béland, Liberal (1897–1902)
- Arthur Godbout, Liberal (1902–1921)
- Joseph-Hughes Fortier, Liberal (1921–1929)
- Joseph-Édouard Fortin, Liberal (1929–1935)
- Vital Cliche, Action liberale nationale (1935–1936)
- Raoul Poulin, Union Nationale (1936)
- Joseph-Émile Perron, Union Nationale (1937–1939)
- Henri-René Renault, Liberal (1939–1944)
- Édouard Lacroix, Bloc populaire canadien (1944–1945)
- Georges-Octave Poulin, Union Nationale (1945–1960)
- Fabien Poulin, Liberal (1960–1962)
- Paul-Émile Allard, Union Nationale (1962–1970)
- Fabien Roy, Ralliement créditiste du Québec, (1970–1973)
