= Fabien Poulin =

Canadian politician

Member of the Legislative Assembly of Quebec for Beauce
- In office 1960–1962
- Preceded by: Georges-Octave Poulin
- Succeeded by: Paul-Émile Allard

Personal details
- Born: January 3, 1928 Saint-Benoît-Labre, Quebec
- Died: March 7, 2005 (aged 77) Saint-Lambert, Quebec
- Party: Liberal

Fabien Poulin (January 3, 1928 – March 7, 2005) was a Canadian provincial politician and physician. He was the Liberal member of the Legislative Assembly of Quebec for Beauce from 1960 to 1962. He was also mayor of Lac-Poulin, Quebec from 1963 to 1964.
