= Thomas Linière Taschereau =

Canadian politician (1850–1901)

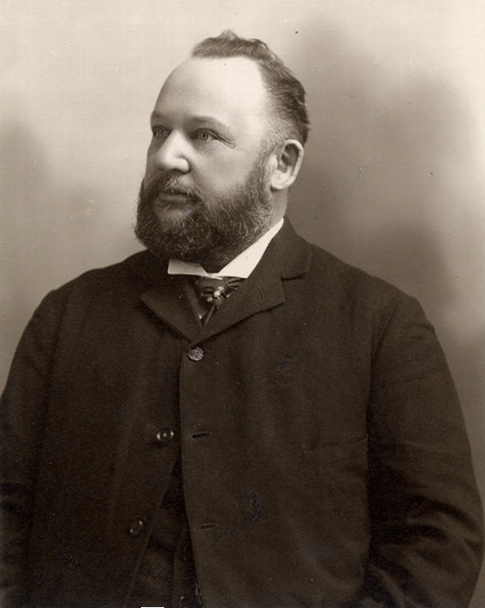

Member of the Canadian Parliament for Beauce
- In office 1884–1887
- Preceded by: Joseph Bolduc
- Succeeded by: Joseph Godbout

Personal details
- Born: October 8, 1850 Sainte-Marie, Canada East
- Died: May 29, 1901 (aged 50) Quebec City, Quebec, Canada
- Party: Conservative

Thomas Linière Taschereau (October 8, 1850 – May 29, 1901) was a lawyer and political figure in Quebec. He represented Beauce in the House of Commons of Canada from 1884 to 1887 as a Conservative Party of Canada member. His name appears in some sources as Jean-Thomas Linière Taschereau or Linière Taschereau.

He was born in Sainte-Marie, Canada East, the son of seigneur Thomas-Jacques Taschereau and Marie Anne Amable Fleury de la Gorgendière. Taschereau was educated at Ste. Anne de la Pocatiere, the Collège Sainte-Marie in Montreal and Université Laval. He entered the practice of law at Saint-Joseph-de-Beauce in 1873 and was named crown prosecutor for the Beauce district in 1881. He married Annie Breakey, the widow of William Berry, in 1874; she died the following year. In 1877, he married Mary, the daughter of Charles Joseph Alleyn. Taschereau was mayor of Saint-Joseph-de-Beauce from 1891 to 1893. He was first elected to the House of Commons in an 1884 by-election held after Joseph Bolduc was named to the Senate. Taschereau ran unsuccessfully in the federal riding of Kamouraska in 1896 and 1900. He died of heart disease in Quebec City at the age of 50.

His daughter Zoé-Mary Stella married Eugène Fiset who later served as lieutenant-governor of Quebec.
