= Joseph Bolduc =

Canadian politician (1847–1924)

The Honourable Joseph Bolduc PC
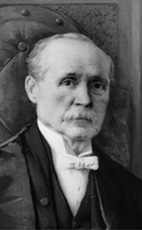

Member of the Canadian Parliament for Beauce
- In office 1876–1884
- Preceded by: Christian Pozer
- Succeeded by: Thomas Linière Taschereau

Senator for Lauzon, Quebec
- In office 1884–1924
- Appointed by: John A. Macdonald
- Preceded by: Christian Pozer
- Succeeded by: Henri Sévérin Béland

Personal details
- Born: June 22, 1847 St-Victor de Tring, Canada East
- Died: August 13, 1924 (aged 77)
- Party: Conservative (1876-1884); Nationalist Conservative (1884-1924)

Joseph Bolduc, PC (June 22, 1847 – August 13, 1924) was Speaker of the Senate of Canada from 1916 to 1922.

He was born in Beauce County, Canada East (Quebec) in 1847, the son of Augustin Bolduc, and was educated at College Sainte-Marie and Université Laval. He graduated as a public notary in 1874 but also earned his living as a farmer and businessman.

In 1874, Bolduc married M.A.G. Mathier. He became a leading member of his community and successfully promoted the construction of a railway connecting his home town of St. Victor de Tring with the rest of the province and the eastern seaboard. He was elected mayor of his town and then warden of Beauce.

In 1876 he was elected in a by-election to the House of Commons of Canada representing the riding of Beauce, Quebec for the Conservative Party. He was re-elected in 1878 and 1882.

He resigned his seat in the House of Commons upon being appointed to the Senate on October 3, 1884.

In 1910, he crossed party lines to support the controversial Laurier government's Naval Services Bill which created the Royal Canadian Navy.

He was appointed Speaker of the Senate by the Conservative government of Robert Borden in 1916 and presided over the upper chamber during the contentious debate on the Military Service Act of 1917, a bill that would introduce conscription. During the debate, he felt obliged to "name" Senator Philippe-Auguste Choquette who was attempting to delay passage of the bill.

Bolduc continued as Speaker until 1922 when he stepped down to the election of a Liberal government. He remained a Senator until his death in 1924 in St. Victor de Tring.
