= Paul-Émile Allard =

Canadian politician

Member of the Legislative Assembly of Quebec for Beauce
- In office 1962–1970
- Preceded by: Fabien Poulin
- Succeeded by: Fabien Roy

Personal details
- Born: July 15, 1920 Chandler, Quebec
- Died: January 6, 1995 (aged 74) Sainte-Foy, Quebec
- Party: Union Nationale

Paul-Émile Allard (July 15, 1920 – January 6, 1995) was a Canadian provincial politician. He was the Union Nationale member of the Legislative Assembly of Quebec for Beauce from 1962 to 1970. He was the Minister of Natural Resources from 1967 to 1970. He was also mayor of Saint-Joseph-de-Beauce, Quebec from 1959 to 1965.
