= Normand Lapointe =

Canadian politician (1939–2025)

Member of Parliament for Beauce
- In office 1980–1984
- Preceded by: Fabien Roy
- Succeeded by: Gilles Bernier

Personal details
- Born: 2 January 1939 Saint-Victor, Quebec, Canada
- Died: 22 October 2025 (aged 86)
- Party: Liberal
- Profession: Insurance agent

Normand Lapointe (2 January 1939 – 22 October 2025) was a Canadian businessman and politician. Lapointe was a Liberal party member of the House of Commons of Canada. He was an insurance agent by career.

== Life and career ==
Born in Saint-Victor, Quebec, Lapointe won Quebec's Beauce electoral district in the 1980 federal election and served in the 32nd Canadian Parliament. He left national politics after his defeat in the 1984 election by Gilles Bernier of the Progressive Conservative party. Lapointe died on 22 October 2025, at the age of 86.
