= Henri-René Renault =

Canadian politician

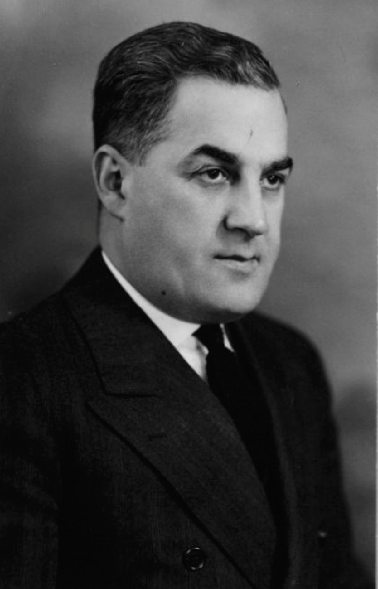

Member of the Legislative Assembly of Quebec for Beauce
- In office 1939–1944
- Preceded by: Joseph-Émile Perron
- Succeeded by: Édouard Lacroix

Personal details
- Born: June 6, 1891 Beauceville, Quebec, Canada
- Died: March 23, 1952 (aged 60) Lake Worth, Florida
- Party: Liberal

Henri-René Renault (June 6, 1891 – March 23, 1952) was a Canadian politician.

Born in Beauceville, Quebec, Renault was mayor of Beauceville-Est from 1930 to 1933.

He was elected to the Legislative Assembly of Quebec as a Liberal member for Beauce in 1939. He was a Minister without Portfolio from 1942 to 1944. In 1944, he was Minister of Municipal Affairs, Industry and Commerce. He was defeated in the 1944 election and again in a 1945 by-election.
