= Joseph Poirier =

Canadian politician

Member of the Legislative Assembly of Quebec for Beauce
- In office 1878–1881
- Preceded by: François-Xavier Dulac
- Succeeded by: Jean Blanchet
- In office 1892–1897
- Preceded by: Jean Blanchet
- Succeeded by: Henri Sévérin Béland

Personal details
- Born: December 21, 1839 Saint-Joseph-de-Beauce, Lower Canada
- Died: February 27, 1917 (aged 77) Saint-Joseph-de-Beauce, Quebec

Joseph Poirier (December 21, 1839 – February 27, 1917) was a farmer and politician in Quebec. He represented Beauce in the Legislative Assembly of Quebec from 1878 to 1881 as a Liberal and from 1892 to 1897 as a Conservative member.

He was born in Saint-Joseph-de-Beauce, Quebec, the son of Vital Poirier and Marie-des-Anges Thibodeau. Poirier studied at the college in Nicolet. In 1863, he married Marie-Agnès Poulin. In 1879, he married Lucie Dupuis after his first wife's death. Poirier ran unsuccessfully for a seat in the House of Commons in 1884 and 1887. He also served as secretary-treasurer for Saint-Joseph municipality. In 1897, he resigned his seat to accept the position of sheriff for Beauce district. Poirier died at Saint-Joseph-de-Beauce at the age of 77.
