= Ludger Dionne =

Canadian politician

Member of the Canadian Parliament for Beauce
- In office September 6, 1945 – April 30, 1949
- Preceded by: Édouard Lacroix
- Succeeded by: Raoul Poulin

Personal details
- Born: March 1, 1888 Sainte-Hélène-de-Chester, Quebec
- Died: June 4, 1962 (aged 74)
- Party: Liberal
- Occupation: Businessman

Ludger Dionne (March 1, 1888 – June 4, 1962) was a Canadian businessman and a politician, who represented the electoral district of Beauce in the House of Commons of Canada from 1945 to 1949.

As a businessman, he operated a shoe factory, a heel factory and a rayon mill in Saint-Georges.

He was first elected to the House of Commons in the 1945 election. When faced with a worker's strike in his rayon mill in 1947, Dionne went to Poland and "hired" 100 Polish Catholic women and emigrated them to Canada to work as either nuns or to work in his rayon mill. During his visit to Poland, he was interviewed by Will Lang Jr. of Life and discussed with Lang his intentions. When Dionne returned to Canada, the striking workers protested to the Canadian government about the immigrants stealing their jobs.

Outraged by Dionne's actions, the Canadian Parliament voted on June 21, 1947, to pass several laws regarding displaced foreign refugees. The controversy also contributed to his defeat in the 1949 election. He also ran in the 1957 election, but was not re-elected.
