= Gérard Perron =

Canadian politician (1920–1981)

Member of Parliament for Beauce
- In office June 1962 – September 1965

Personal details
- Born: 14 November 1920 Sainte-Thècle, Quebec
- Died: 2 April 1981 (aged 60) Quebec City, Quebec
- Party: Social Credit; Ralliement Créditiste
- Profession: Hotelier

Gérard Perron (14 November 1920 – 2 April 1981) was a Social Credit party member of the House of Commons of Canada. He was a hotel operator by career.

He was first elected at the Beauce riding in the 1962 general election and re-elected there in 1963. From 1963 until the end of his final term, the 26th Canadian Parliament, his party was known as the Ralliement créditiste.

Perron was defeated in the 1965 federal election at Beauce riding by Jean-Paul Racine of the Liberal party. In the 1972 election, Perron campaigned for a seat at the Labelle riding but was defeated by Maurice Dupras of the Liberal party.
