= Gilles Bernier (Quebec politician) =

Canadian politician (born 1934)

Ambassador Extraordinary and Plenipotentiary to Haiti
- In office 1997–2001
- Preceded by: J. Christopher Poole
- Succeeded by: Kenneth Murray Cook

Member of Parliament for Beauce
- In office November 5, 1984 – June 2, 1997
- Preceded by: Normand Lapointe
- Succeeded by: Claude Drouin

Personal details
- Born: July 15, 1934 (age 92) Montreal, Quebec, Canada
- Party: Progressive Conservative
- Other political affiliations: Independent (1993-1995)
- Spouse: Doris Rodrigue
- Children: 4, including Maxime
- Occupation: Broadcaster

Gilles Bernier (born July 15, 1934) is a former Canadian politician and diplomat. He was the Member of Parliament representing the riding of Beauce from 1984 to 1997, initially as a Progressive Conservative and later as an independent. He later served as Canada's ambassador to Haiti from 1997 to 2001.

== Life and career ==
Bernier was born in Montreal, Quebec, the son of Annette (Letourneau) and Amedee Bernier. Bernier moved to the Beauce in 1953 to pursue a radio career at CKRB in Saint-Georges-de-Beauce, and quickly became a local celebrity. Capitalizing on his popularity, he decided to go into politics in the 1984 election. He served two terms as a Tory but was forced to run as an independent in the 1993 election after Prime Minister Kim Campbell, the party's leader, barred him from running under the PC banner due to fraud charges. Bernier was later acquitted of the charges.

In 1997, Prime Minister Jean Chrétien named him ambassador to Haiti.

Bernier's son, Maxime Bernier, won Beauce in turn from Drouin in the 2006 federal election, as a candidate of the merged Conservative Party of Canada. Maxime Bernier would serve as Minister of Industry and Minister of Foreign Affairs in the government led by Stephen Harper before resigning from the cabinet in 2008. He would later leave the Conservative Party and form his own party, the People's Party of Canada, after placing second in the 2017 leadership race.

== Electoral record ==
1993 Canadian federal election
Party	Candidate	Votes
Independent	Gilles Bernier	20,238
Bloc Québécois	Jean-Guy Breton	18,271
Liberal	Pierre Gravel	7,336
Progressive Conservative	Jeannine Bourque	4,098
New Democratic	Tom Vouloumanos	364

1988 Canadian federal election
Party	Candidate	Votes
Progressive Conservative	Gilles Bernier	36,212
Liberal	Pierre-Maurice Vachon	13,641
New Democratic	Danielle Wolfe	2,856

1984 Canadian federal election
Party	Candidate	Votes
Progressive Conservative	Gilles Bernier	25,028
Liberal	Normand Lapointe	20,323
New Democratic	Serge L'Italien	1,217
Parti nationaliste	Paul-Emile Grondin	569
