= Patrice Moore =

Canadian politician and radio host

Personal details
- Profession: Journalist, radio host

Patrice Moore is a Canadian radio host. He was a political candidate for the House of Commons of Canada for the Bloc Québécois in the riding of Beauce in the 2006 Canadian federal election. He finished second behind the Conservative candidate, Maxime Bernier. He is currently the morning show host at CKRB-FM (COOL-FM) in Saint-Georges.
