= Beauce (federal electoral district) =

Federal electoral district in Quebec, Canada

Coordinates: 46.220°N 70.741°W

Quebec electoral district
- Interactive map of riding boundaries from the 2015 federal election

Federal electoral district
- Legislature: House of Commons
MP
Jason Groleau
Conservative
- District created: 1867
- First contested: 1867
- Last contested: 2025
- District webpage: profile, map

Demographics
- Population (2016): 108,746
- Electors (2019): 86,333
- Area (km²): 4,103.54
- Pop. density (per km²): 26.5
- Census division(s): Beauce-Sartigan RCM, Les Etchemins RCM, Le Granit RCM, La Nouvelle-Beauce RCM, Beauce-Centre RCM
- Census subdivision(s): Saint-Georges, Sainte-Marie, Beauceville, Saint-Joseph-de-Beauce, Saint-Prosper, Saint-Isidore, Saint-Côme-Linière, Saint-Martin, Scott, Saint-Bernard

Beauce (French pronunciation: [bos]) is a federal electoral district in Quebec, Canada. It had a population of 111,035 people as of the 2021 census. During the 2025 federal election, it had a voter roll of 88,888 eligible voters.

Beauce is one of only four electoral districts that has been continually represented in the House of Commons of Canada since Confederation in 1867 with the same electoral district name, the other three being :

- Shefford in the Eastern Townships, Quebec
- Simcoe North in central Ontario
- Halifax in Nova Scotia, a dual-member district in all elections up to 1965

== Demographics ==
According to the 2021 Canadian census, 2023 representation order

Racial groups: 96.4% White, 1.5% Indigenous
Languages: 97.7% French, 1.2% English
Religions: 83.3% Christian (75.4% Catholic, 7.8% Other), 16.1% None
Median income: $40,800 (2020)
Average income: $46,120 (2020)

As of the 2006 census, the Beauce riding had the highest percentage of people who answered "Canadian" as their ethnic origin in the 2006 Census (84.0%; multiple responses). It was also the riding with the highest percentage of White people of European descent (99.3%).

== Geography ==
The riding is located in Central Quebec, to the south of Quebec City and covers the centre of Beauce, straddling the Quebec region of Chaudière-Appalaches.

The electoral district has the regional county municipality of Beauce-Sartigan; the Regional County of Beauce-Centre, excepting the area of the former municipality of Courcelles; that part of the Regional County Municipality of Les Etchemins comprises the municipalities of Sainte-Aurélie, Saint-Benjamin, Saint-Prosper and Saint-Zacharie; the Regional County Municipality of La Nouvelle-Beauce, excepting the Parish Municipality of Saint-Lambert-de-Lauzon; and that part of the Regional County Municipality of Le Granit comprises the municipalities of Saint-Ludger and Saint-Robert-Bellarmin.

The neighbouring ridings are Mégantic—L'Érable—Lotbinière, Lévis—Lotbinière, and Bellechasse—Les Etchemins—Lévis.

== History ==
The riding was created by the British North America Act 1867, and still exists today without any name changes, although its boundaries have been redefined numerous times.

Following the 2012 federal electoral redistribution, this riding lost a small territory to Mégantic—L'Érable. It is one of a small minority of Quebecois ridings never to have elected a Bloc Quebecois MP, even in 1993.

== Members of Parliament ==
This riding has elected the following members of Parliament:

Parliament	Years	Member	Party
1st	1867–1872	Christian Pozer	Liberal
2nd	1872–1874	Christian Pozer	Liberal
3rd	1874–1876	Christian Pozer	Liberal
3rd	1876–1878	Joseph Bolduc	Conservative
4th	1878–1882	Joseph Bolduc	Conservative
5th	1882–1884	Joseph Bolduc	Conservative
5th	1884–1887	Thomas Linière Taschereau	Conservative
6th	1887–1891	Joseph Godbout	Liberal
7th	1891–1896	Joseph Godbout	Liberal
8th	1896–1900	Joseph Godbout	Liberal
9th	1900–1901	Joseph Godbout	Liberal
9th	1902–1904	Henri Sévérin Béland	Liberal
10th	1904–1908	Henri Sévérin Béland	Liberal
11th	1908–1911	Henri Sévérin Béland	Liberal
12th	1911–1917	Henri Sévérin Béland	Liberal
13th	1917–1921	Henri Sévérin Béland	Liberal
14th	1921–1925	Henri Sévérin Béland	Liberal
15th	1925–1926	Édouard Lacroix	Liberal
16th	1926–1930	Édouard Lacroix	Liberal
17th	1930–1935	Édouard Lacroix	Liberal
18th	1935–1940	Édouard Lacroix	Liberal
19th	1940–1945	Édouard Lacroix	Liberal
20th	1945–1949	Ludger Dionne	Liberal
21st	1949–1953	Raoul Poulin	Independent
22nd	1953–1957	Raoul Poulin	Independent
23rd	1957–1958	Raoul Poulin	Independent
24th	1958–1962	Jean-Paul Racine	Liberal
25th	1962–1963	Gérard Perron	Social Credit
26th	1963–1965	Gérard Perron	Social Credit
27th	1965–1968	Jean-Paul Racine	Liberal
28th	1968–1971	Romuald Rodrigue	Ralliement créditiste
28th	1971–1972	Romuald Rodrigue	Social Credit
29th	1972–1974	Yves Caron	Liberal
30th	1974–1979	Yves Caron	Liberal
31st	1979–1980	Fabien Roy	Social Credit
32nd	1980–1984	Normand Lapointe	Liberal
33rd	1984–1988	Gilles Bernier	Progressive Conservative
34th	1988–1993	Gilles Bernier	Progressive Conservative
35th	1993–1997	Gilles Bernier	Independent
36th	1997–2000	Claude Drouin	Liberal
37th	2000–2004	Claude Drouin	Liberal
38th	2004–2006	Claude Drouin	Liberal
39th	2006–2008	Maxime Bernier	Conservative
40th	2008–2011	Maxime Bernier	Conservative
41st	2011–2015	Maxime Bernier	Conservative
42nd	2015–2018	Maxime Bernier	Conservative
42nd	2018–2018	Maxime Bernier	Independent
42nd	2018–2019	Maxime Bernier	People's
43rd	2019–2021	Richard Lehoux	Conservative
44th	2021–2025	Richard Lehoux	Conservative
45th	2025–present	Jason Groleau	Conservative

== Electoral history ==
Election results in Beauce since 1867(minor parties that never got 2% of the vote or didn't run consistently are omitted) View source data.

=== Beauce, 2023 representation order ===
This riding had no boundary changes made prior to the 45th Canadian federal election:

2025 Canadian federal election: Beauce
Party	Candidate	Votes	%	±%	Expenditures
Conservative	Jason Groleau	37,604	59.71	+11.42	$56,895.72
Liberal	Maryelle-Henriette Doumbia	12,057	19.14	+6.83	$4,172.00
Bloc Québécois	Gaétan Mathieu	8,595	13.65	–1.52	$7,994.66
People's	Maxime Bernier	3,626	5.76	–12.43	$38,130.10
New Democratic	Annabelle Lafond-Poirier	1,100	1.75	–1.16	$3.75
Total valid votes/expense limit		62,982	98.49	+0.04	$134,948.19
Total rejected ballots		963	1.51	–0.04	
Turnout		63,945	71.94	+5.31	
Eligible voters (Note: Number of eligible voters does not include election day registrations.)		88,888			
Conservative hold		Swing		+2.30	
Source: Elections Canada

=== Beauce, 2013 representation order ===
2021 Canadian federal election: Beauce
Party	Candidate	Votes	%	±%	Expenditures
Conservative	Richard Lehoux	27,514	48.29	+9.70	$54,511.58
People's	Maxime Bernier	10,362	18.19	-10.18	$65,399.38
Bloc Québécois	Solange Thibodeau	8,644	15.17	+1.04	$4,385.30
Liberal	Philippe-Alexandre Langlois	7,018	12.32	+0.66	$5,569.50
New Democratic	François Jacques-Côté	1,654	2.90	-0.14	$24.86
Free	Chantale Giguère	1,096	1.92	–	$1,476.73
Green	Andrzej Wisniowski	486	0.85	-1.54	$0.00
Marijuana	Sébastien Tanguay	206	0.36	–	$0.00
Total valid votes/expense limit		56,980	98.45	–	$115,918.81
Total rejected ballots		895	1.55		
Turnout		57,875	66.63	-3.02	
Eligible voters		86,857			
Conservative hold		Swing		+9.94	
Source: Elections Canada

2019 Canadian federal election: Beauce
Party	Candidate	Votes	%	±%	Expenditures
Conservative	Richard Lehoux	22,817	38.59	-20.39	$88,659.51
People's	Maxime Bernier	16,772	28.37	–	$92,268.96
Bloc Québécois	Guillaume Rodrigue	8,355	14.13	+6.68	$2,029.97
Liberal	Adam Veilleux	6,895	11.66	-10.56	$42,675.69
New Democratic	François Jacques-Côté	1,799	3.04	-6.64	$96.82
Green	Josiane Fortin	1,415	2.39	+0.7	none listed
Rhinoceros	Maxime Bernier	1,072	1.81	–	none listed
Total valid votes/expense limit		59,125	100.00		$112,590
Total rejected ballots		1,147	1.89	+0.64	
Turnout		59,125	68.48	+2.33	
Eligible voters		86,333			
Conservative hold		Swing		–	
Maxime Bernier was the incumbent MP. After being elected as a Conservative in 2015, he founded the People's Party on September 14, 2018 and sat as their lone MP until dissolution.
Source: Elections Canada

This riding lost a small portion of its territory to Mégantic—L'Érable prior to the 42nd Canadian federal election:

2015 Canadian federal election: Beauce
Party	Candidate	Votes	%	±%	Expenditures
Conservative	Maxime Bernier	32,910	58.89	+8.17	$141,146.53
Liberal	Adam Veilleux	12,442	22.26	+11.27	$37,503.99
New Democratic	Daniel Royer	5,443	9.74	-20.26	$1,888.06
Bloc Québécois	Stéphane Trudel	4,144	7.42	+0.75	$1,993.05
Green	Céline Brown MacDonald	943	1.69	+0.08	–
Total valid votes/expense limit		55,882	100.0		$224,222.11
Total rejected ballots		712	1.25	0.02	
Turnout		56,594	66.15	–	
Eligible voters		85,547			
Conservative hold		Swing		+14.22	
Source: Elections Canada

2011 federal election redistributed results
Party	Vote	%
Conservative	26,400	50.72
New Democratic	15,613	30.0
Liberal	5,722	10.99
Bloc Québécois	3,472	6.67
Green	840	1.61

=== Beauce, 2003 representation order ===
2011 Canadian federal election: Beauce
Party	Candidate	Votes	%	±%	Expenditures
Conservative	Maxime Bernier	26,799	50.71	-11.70	$80,639.74
New Democratic	Serge Bergeron	15,831	29.95	+21.43	$1,165.17
Liberal	Claude Morin	5,833	11.04	+0.72	$53,133.79
Bloc Québécois	Sylvio Morin	3,535	6.69	-7.29	$19,711.99
Green	Etienne Doyon Lessard	852	1.61	-3.16	$2.00
Total valid votes/expense limit		52,850	100.0		$90,992.37
Total rejected, unmarked and declined ballots		681	1.27	-0.30	
Turnout		53,531	63.02	+0.64	
Eligible voters		84,941			
Conservative hold		Swing		-16.56	

2008 Canadian federal election
Party	Candidate	Votes	%	±%	Expenditures
Conservative	Maxime Bernier	31,883	62.41	-4.61	$69,558.01
Bloc Québécois	André Côté	7,143	13.98	-5.99	$13,263,15
Liberal	René Roy	5,270	10.32	+2.40	$2,129.85
New Democratic	Véronique Poulin	4,352	8.52	+5.97	$2,575.32
Green	Nicolas Rochette	2,436	4.77	+2.23	none listed
Total valid votes/expense limit		51,084	100.0		$87,470
Total rejected, unmarked and declined ballots		817	1.57	+0.75	
Turnout		51,901	62.38	-5.24	
Eligible voters		83,205			
Conservative hold		Swing		+0.69	

2006 Canadian federal election
Party	Candidate	Votes	%	±%	Expenditures
Conservative	Maxime Bernier	36,915	67.02	+49.93	$79,344.54
Bloc Québécois	Patrice Moore	10,997	19.97	-16.29	$66,069.90
Liberal	Jacques Lussier	4,364	7.92	-33.46	$54,809.07
New Democratic	Cléo Chartier	1,405	2.55	-0.50	$1,020.20
Green	Jean-Claude Roy	1,397	2.54	+0.31	$108.47
Total valid votes/expense limit		55,078	100.0		$81,497
Total rejected, unmarked and declined ballots		454	0.82	-1.42	
Turnout		55,532	67.62	+8.12	
Eligible voters		82,123			
Conservative gain from Liberal		Swing		+33.11	

2004 Canadian federal election
Party	Candidate	Votes	%	±%	Expenditures
Liberal	Claude Drouin	19,592	41.38	-14.58	$53,359.24
Bloc Québécois	Jean-François Barbe	17,168	36.26	+9.73	$14,212.14
Conservative	Alain Guay	8,091	17.09	+1.84	$7,117.54
New Democratic	Philippe Giguère	1,443	3.05	+2.11	$1,376.85
Green	Michel Binette	1,054	2.23	–	none listed
Total valid votes/expense limit		47,348	100.0		$79,683
Total rejected, unmarked and declined ballots		1,083	2.24		
Turnout		48,431	59.50	-1.90	
Eligible voters		81,392			
Liberal notional hold		Swing		-12.16	
Changes from 2000 are based on redistributed results. Change for the Conservative Party is based on the combined totals of the Canadian Alliance and Progressive Conservatives Party.

2000 federal election redistributed results
Party	Vote	%
Liberal	25,861	55.96
Bloc Québécois	12,261	26.53
Alliance	5,416	11.72
Progressive Conservative	1,631	3.53
Others	612	1.32
New Democratic	435	0.94

=== Beauce, previous elections ===
2000 Canadian federal election
Party	Candidate	Votes	%	±%
Liberal	Claude Drouin	26,033	56.0	+6.9
Bloc Québécois	Gary Morin	12,323	26.5	-0.1
Alliance	Alain Guay	5,452	11.7	
Progressive Conservative	Gérard Parent	1,628	3.5	-17.3
Natural Law	Louis Girard	611	1.3	
New Democratic	Pierre Malano	436	0.9	-0.7
Total valid votes		46,483	100.0	

1997 Canadian federal election
Party	Candidate	Votes	%	±%
Liberal	Claude Drouin	22,156	49.1	+34.5
Bloc Québécois	Lucie Dion	12,002	26.6	-9.7
Progressive Conservative	Lise Bernier	9,385	20.8	+12.7
Independent	Lili Weemen	843	1.9	
New Democratic	Joël Pinon	735	1.6	+0.9
Total valid votes		45,121	100.0	

1993 Canadian federal election
Party	Candidate	Votes	%	±%
Independent	Gilles Bernier	20,238	40.2	
Bloc Québécois	Jean-Guy Breton	18,271	36.3	
Liberal	Pierre Gravel	7,336	14.6	-11.3
Progressive Conservative	Jeannine Bourque	4,098	8.1	-60.6
New Democratic	Tom Vouloumanos	364	0.7	-4.7
Total valid votes		50,307	100.0	

1988 Canadian federal election
Party	Candidate	Votes	%	±%
Progressive Conservative	Gilles Bernier	36,212	68.7	+15.6
Liberal	Pierre-Maurice Vachon	13,641	25.9	-17.2
New Democratic	Danielle Wolfe	2,856	5.4	+2.8
Total valid votes		52,709	100.0	

1984 Canadian federal election
Party	Candidate	Votes	%	±%
Progressive Conservative	Gilles Bernier	25,028	53.1	+51.2
Liberal	Normand Lapointe	20,323	43.1	-7.8
New Democratic	Serge L'Italien	1,217	2.6	+1.6
Parti nationaliste	Paul-Emile Grondin	569	1.2	
Total valid votes		47,137	100.0	

1980 Canadian federal election
Party	Candidate	Votes	%	±%
Liberal	Normand Lapointe	21,647	50.9	+15.8
Social Credit	Fabien Roy	18,734	44.0	-13.1
Progressive Conservative	Michel Brochu	819	1.9	-4.3
Rhinoceros	Germain Lambert	624	1.5	+0.7
New Democratic	Luc Pepin	404	0.9	+0.5
Independent	Renaud Loubier	276	0.6	
Marxist–Leninist	Claude Moreau	38	0.1	
Total valid votes		42,542	100.0	

1979 Canadian federal election
Party	Candidate	Votes	%	±%
Social Credit	Fabien Roy	24,770	57.1	+27.7
Liberal	Yves Caron	15,193	35.0	-7.3
Progressive Conservative	Paul-André Busque	2,704	6.2	-19.4
Rhinoceros	Michel Chretien	344	0.8	
New Democratic	Raymond Philippe Roy	215	0.5	-0.8
Union populaire	Marcel Baron	128	0.3	
Total valid votes		43,354	100.0	

1974 Canadian federal election
Party	Candidate	Votes	%	±%
Liberal	Yves Caron	13,855	42.3	+1.2
Social Credit	Romuald Rodrigue	9,640	29.4	-10.2
Progressive Conservative	Paul-André Busque	8,385	25.6	+8.3
Independent	Claude Grenier	442	1.4	
New Democratic	Lucille Jacques	418	1.3	-0.7
Total valid votes		32,740	100.0	

1972 Canadian federal election
Party	Candidate	Votes	%	±%
Liberal	Yves Caron	13,170	41.1	+13.7
Social Credit	Romuald Rodrigue	12,686	39.6	-7.9
Progressive Conservative	Paul-André Busque	5,551	17.3	-4.6
New Democratic	Bertrand Gosselin	632	2.0	-0.3
Total valid votes		32,039	100.0	

Note: Social Credit vote is compared to Ralliement créditiste vote in the 1968 election.

1968 Canadian federal election
Party	Candidate	Votes	%	±%
Ralliement créditiste	Romuald Rodrigue	13,428	47.5	+19.5
Liberal	Jean-Paul Racine	7,752	27.4	-13.9
Progressive Conservative	Gilles Beaudoin	6,207	21.9	+20.6
New Democratic	Bertrand Gosselin	639	2.3	-27.2
Independent	André Mathieu	260	0.9	
Total valid votes		28,286	100.0	

1965 Canadian federal election
Party	Candidate	Votes	%	±%
Liberal	Jean-Paul Racine	10,530	41.3	-0.8
New Democratic	Robert Cliche	7,514	29.4	+26.5
Ralliement créditiste	Gérard Perron	7,138	28.0	-22.5
Progressive Conservative	Pierre Bardou	338	1.3	-3.2
Total valid votes		25,520	100.0	

Note: Ralliement créditiste vote is compared to Social Credit vote in the 1963 election.

1963 Canadian federal election
Party	Candidate	Votes	%	±%
Social Credit	Gérard Perron	12,627	50.4	-8.4
Liberal	Jean-Paul Racine	10,532	42.1	+4.3
Progressive Conservative	Serge Beaudoin	1,134	4.5	+1.1
New Democratic	Jean-Claude Morin	740	3.0	
Total valid votes		25,033	100.0	

1962 Canadian federal election
Party	Candidate	Votes	%	±%
Social Credit	Gérard Perron	15,230	58.8	
Liberal	Jean-Paul Racine	9,774	37.7	-4.6
Progressive Conservative	Georges Dubois	901	3.5	-13.7
Total valid votes		25,905	100.0	

1958 Canadian federal election
Party	Candidate	Votes	%	±%
Liberal	Jean-Paul Racine	10,417	42.3	-6.0
Independent	Raoul Poulin	9,984	40.6	-11.2
Progressive Conservative	Eddy Hall	4,217	17.1	
Total valid votes		24,618	100.0	

1957 Canadian federal election
Party	Candidate	Votes	%	±%
Independent	Raoul Poulin	12,384	51.7	-5.5
Liberal	Ludger Dionne	11,559	48.3	+5.5
Total valid votes		23,943	100.0	

1953 Canadian federal election
Party	Candidate	Votes	%	±%
Independent	Raoul Poulin	13,016	57.3	+10.9
Liberal	Louis Poulin	9,716	42.7	-2.6
Total valid votes		22,732	100.0	

1949 Canadian federal election
Party	Candidate	Votes	%	±%
Independent	Raoul Poulin	10,267	46.3	
Liberal	Ludger Dionne	10,045	45.3	+2.8
Social Credit	Rosaire Fortier	1,840	8.3	-16.9
Total valid votes		22,152	100.0	

1945 Canadian federal election
Party	Candidate	Votes	%	±%
Liberal	Ludger Dionne	9,612	42.6	-37.3
Independent	Charles Lacroix	7,264	32.2	
Social Credit	Eugène Fortin	5,701	25.3	

1940 Canadian federal election
Party	Candidate	Votes	%	±%
Liberal	Maurice-Ernest-Edouard Lacroix	12,482	79.9	-9.1
National Government	Josaphat Poulin	3,142	20.1	
Total valid votes		15,624	100.0	

1935 Canadian federal election
Party	Candidate	Votes	%	±%
Liberal	Edouard Lacroix	15,263	89.0	+24.1
Reconstruction	Paul-Henri Berube	1,896	11.0	
Total valid votes		17,159	100.0	

1930 Canadian federal election
Party	Candidate	Votes	%	±%
Liberal	Edouard Lacroix	12,093	64.8	-16.6
Conservative	J.-Linière Jacob	6,567	35.2	+16.6
Total valid votes		18,660	100.0	

1926 Canadian federal election
Party	Candidate	Votes	%	±%
Liberal	Edouard Lacroix	11,176	81.4	+3.8
Conservative	Wilfrid Duval	2,551	18.6	-3.8
Total valid votes		13,727	100.0	

1925 Canadian federal election
Party	Candidate	Votes	%	±%
Liberal	Edouard Lacroix	12,765	77.6	-12.4
Conservative	Louis Morin	3,684	22.4	+12.4
Total valid votes		16,449	100.0	

By-election on 19 January 1922 Béland accepted a government position
Party	Candidate	Votes
Liberal	Henri Sévérin Béland	acclaimed

1921 Canadian federal election
Party	Candidate	Votes	%
Liberal	Henri Sévérin Béland	12,030	90.0
Conservative	J. Ephrem Lambert	1,335	10.0
Total valid votes		13,365	100.0

1917 Canadian federal election
Party	Candidate	Votes
Liberal	Henri Sévérin Béland	acclaimed

1911 Canadian federal election
Party	Candidate	Votes	%	±%
Liberal	Henri Sévérin Béland	4,823	58.2	-37.5
Conservative	Georges Cloutier	3,459	41.8	+37.5
Total valid votes		8,282	100.0	

1908 Canadian federal election
Party	Candidate	Votes	%	±%
Liberal	Henri Sévérin Béland	4,083	95.7	+22.4
Conservative	Alphonse Poirier	183	4.3	-22.4
Total valid votes		4,266	100.0	

1904 Canadian federal election
Party	Candidate	Votes	%	±%
Liberal	Henri Sévérin Béland	3,601	73.3	+12.1
Conservative	E.M.A. Savard	1,311	26.7	-12.1
Total valid votes		4,912	100.0	

Note: results compared to results of 1900 general election.

By-election on 8 January 1902 Godbout appointed to the Senate
Party	Candidate	Votes
Liberal	Henri Sévérin Béland	acclaimed

1900 Canadian federal election
Party	Candidate	Votes	%	±%
Liberal	Joseph Godbout	3,432	61.2	+7.4
Conservative	Charles Bolduc	2,175	38.8	-7.4
Total valid votes		5,607	100.0	

1896 Canadian federal election
Party	Candidate	Votes	%	±%
Liberal	Joseph Godbout	3,003	53.8	-2.0
Conservative	G. Cloutier	2,576	46.2	+2.0
Total valid votes		5,579	100.0	

1891 Canadian federal election
Party	Candidate	Votes	%	±%
Liberal	Joseph Godbout	2,313	55.8	
Conservative	J.A. Morency	1,832	44.2	
Total valid votes		4,145	100.0	

1887 Canadian federal election
Party	Candidate	Votes	%	±%
Independent Liberal	Joseph Godbout	1,900	52.0	
Conservative	Joseph Poirier	1,268	34.7	-20.5
Independent	F.X. Dulac	483	13.6	
Total valid votes		3,651	100.0	

Canadian federal by-election, 31 October 1884
Party	Candidate	Votes	%	±%
On Mr. Bolduc being called to the Senate
Conservative	Thomas Linière Taschereau	1,649	55.2	-15.6
Unknown	J. Poirier	1,336	44.8	+15.6
Total valid votes		2,985	100.0	

1882 Canadian federal election
Party	Candidate	Votes	%	±%
Conservative	Joseph Bolduc	2,153	70.8	-8.4
Independent	F.X. Lemieux	889	29.2	
Total valid votes		3,042	100.0	

1878 Canadian federal election
Party	Candidate	Votes	%	±%
Conservative	Joseph Bolduc	1,523	79.2	+25.5
Independent	George Lesard	401	20.8	
Total valid votes		1,924	100.0	

Canadian federal by-election, 18 October 1876
Party	Candidate	Votes	%
Conservative	Joseph Bolduc	1,404	53.6
Independent	De Lery	1,215	46.4
Total valid votes		2,619	100.0
Called upon Pozer being appointed to the Senate.

1874 Canadian federal election
Party	Candidate	Votes
Liberal	Christian Henry Pozer	acclaimed

1872 Canadian federal election
Party	Candidate	Votes	%	±%
Liberal	Christian Henry Pozer	1,885	70.9	+5.7
Independent	J. Blanchet	772	29.1	
Total valid votes		2,657	100.0	

1867 Canadian federal election
Party	Candidate	Votes	%
Liberal	Christian Henry Pozer	1,180	65.2
Unknown	Henri Elzéar Taschereau	629	34.8
Total valid votes		1,809	100.0

== See also ==
- List of Canadian electoral districts
- Historical federal electoral districts of Canada
