= Vital Cliche =

Canadian politician

Member of the Legislative Assembly of Quebec for Beauce
- In office 1935–1936
- Preceded by: Joseph-Édouard Fortin
- Succeeded by: Raoul Poulin

Personal details
- Born: September 10, 1890 Saint-Joseph-de-Beauce, Quebec
- Died: February 23, 1976 (aged 85) Beauceville, Quebec
- Party: Action libérale nationale

Vital Cliche (September 10, 1890 – February 23, 1976) was a politician Quebec, Canada and a Member of the Legislative Assembly of Quebec (MLA).

== Early life ==
He was born on September 10, 1890, in Saint-Joseph-de-Beauce, Quebec and became an insurance broker. He was the father of politician Lucien Cliche.

== Local politics ==
Cliche served as a school board member in 1919 and as Mayor of Vallée-Jonction, Quebec from 1931 to 1932.

== Member of the legislature ==
He ran as an Action libérale nationale candidate in the district of Beauce in the 1935 provincial election and won. Cliche refused to join Maurice Duplessis's Union Nationale. Instead, he ran as an Independent Liberal in the 1936 election and lost to Raoul Poulin. He also ran as an Action libérale nationale candidate and lost a by-election that was called in 1937 as a result of Poulin's switch to federal politics.

== Death ==
He died on February 23, 1976.
