= Jason Groleau =

Canadian politician

Jason Groleau MP

Member of Parliament for Beauce
- Incumbent
- Assumed office April 28, 2025
- Preceded by: Richard Lehoux

Personal details
- Born: August 3, 1976 (age 50) Hartford, Connecticut, United States
- Party: Conservative
Ice hockey career
- Height: 178 cm (5 ft 10 in)
- Weight: 84 kg (185 lb; 13 st 3 lb)
- Position: Defence
- Played for: Verdun Collège Français; Hull Olympiques; Victoriaville Tigres; Saint-Georges Garaga; Ste. Marie Derek Structures; Quebec RadioX; St. Georges CRS Express

Jason Groleau MP (born August 3, 1976) is a Canadian politician from the Conservative Party of Canada. He was elected as a member of Parliament for Beauce in the 2025 Canadian federal election. Groleau is a businessman. He is also a former hockey player that played in the Quebec Major Junior Hockey League for six seasons.

== Electoral record ==
2025 Canadian federal election: Beauce
Party	Candidate	Votes	%	±%	Expenditures
Conservative	Jason Groleau	37,604	59.71	+11.42	$56,895.72
Liberal	Maryelle-Henriette Doumbia	12,057	19.14	+6.83	$4,172.00
Bloc Québécois	Gaétan Mathieu	8,595	13.65	–1.52	$7,994.66
People's	Maxime Bernier	3,626	5.76	–12.43	$38,130.10
New Democratic	Annabelle Lafond-Poirier	1,100	1.75	–1.16	$3.75
Total valid votes/expense limit		62,982	98.49	+0.04	$134,948.19
Total rejected ballots		963	1.51	–0.04	
Turnout		63,945	71.94	+5.31	
Eligible voters (Note: Number of eligible voters does not include election day registrations.)		88,888			
Conservative hold		Swing		+2.30	
Source: Elections Canada
