= Romuald Rodrigue =

Canadian politician (1929–2020)

Member of Parliament for Beauce
- In office June 1968 – October 1972

Personal details
- Born: June 5, 1929 Saint-Georges, Quebec
- Died: April 19, 2020 (aged 90)
- Party: Social Credit
- Spouse(s): Huguette Gilbert (m. 21 October 1967)
- Profession: Accountant, administrator, manager

Romuald Rodrigue (June 5, 1929 – April 19, 2020) was a Ralliement créditiste and Social Credit party member of the House of Commons of Canada. He was an accountant, administrator and manager by career.

Born in Saint-Georges, Quebec, Rodrigue attended the local high school and studied at Saint-Georges Seminary. He was elected at the Beauce riding in the 1968 general election and served one term, the 28th Canadian Parliament. Initially, his party was known as the Ralliement créditiste; in April 1971, it became known as Social Credit. Rodrigue left federal politics after he was defeated at Beauce in the 1972 and 1974 federal elections.
