= Georges-Octave Poulin =

Canadian politician

Member of the Legislative Assembly of Quebec for Beauce
- In office 1945–1960
- Preceded by: Édouard Lacroix
- Succeeded by: Fabien Poulin

Personal details
- Born: August 20, 1894 Saint-Martin, Beauce, Quebec
- Died: March 15, 1963 (aged 68) Saint-Martin, Quebec
- Party: Union Nationale

Georges-Octave Poulin (August 20, 1894 – March 15, 1963) was a Canadian provincial politician. He was the Union Nationale member of the Legislative Assembly of Quebec for Beauce from 1945 to 1960.
