= Édouard Lacroix =

Canadian politician (1889–1963)

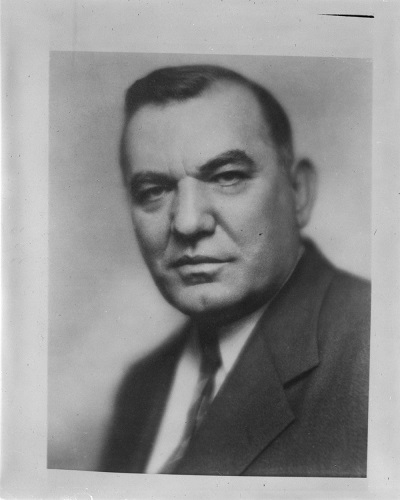

Member of the Canadian Parliament for Beauce
- In office 1925–1943
- Preceded by: Henri Sévérin Béland
- Succeeded by: Ludger Dionne

Member of the Legislative Assembly of Quebec for Beauce
- In office 1944–1945
- Preceded by: Henri-René Renault
- Succeeded by: Georges-Octave Poulin

Personal details
- Born: January 6, 1889 Sainte-Marie, Quebec
- Died: January 19, 1963 (aged 74) Saint-Georges, Quebec
- Party: Liberal
- Children: Robert Dutil, grandson

Édouard Lacroix (January 6, 1889 – January 19, 1963) was a politician and business person in Quebec, Canada.

== Background ==
He was born on January 6, 1889, in Sainte-Marie, Quebec. At the age of 12, he began working in United States lumber camps along the Maine border, where he learned the logging trade. He returned to Saint-Georges, Quebec, at the age of 16 and formed his own company in 1911. He made career in forestry and opened a lumber plant in Gaspésie–Îles-de-la-Madeleine.

== Member of Parliament ==
Lacroix ran as a Liberal candidate in the district of Beauce in the 1925 federal election and won. He was re-elected in the 1926, 1930, 1935, and 1940 elections.

In September 1939, Lacroix and his fellow Quebec Liberal MP Liguori Lacombe introduced an amendment calling for Canadian "non-participation" in the World War II, which reflected some reluctance by French Canadians to join Britain in the war. The two MPs, who proved to be the amendment's only supporters, were condemned in a Globe and Mail editorial the following day as "two French-Canadians who gained eternal distinction by an attitude unworthy of their people and country."

He left the Liberals and joined the Bloc populaire canadien on February 18, 1943. He resigned his seat on July 11, 1944, to switch to provincial politics.

== Provincial politics ==
Lacroix, who had been a supporter of the Action libérale nationale in the 1930s, successfully ran as a Bloc populaire candidate in the provincial district of Beauce in the 1944 provincial election. He never took his seat at the Legislative Assembly. He resigned and left politics on May 14, 1945.

== Death ==
He died on January 19, 1963.
