= Fabien Roy =

Canadian politician (1928–2023)

Leader of the Social Credit Party
- In office March 30, 1979 – November 1, 1980
- Preceded by: Charles-Arthur Gauthier (acting)
- Succeeded by: Martin Hattersley

Leader of the Parti national populaire
- In office March 29, 1977 – April 5, 1979
- Preceded by: Jérôme Choquette
- Succeeded by: Position abolished
Parliamentary constituencies
Member of Parliament for Beauce
In office May 22, 1979 – February 18, 1980
Preceded by	Yves Caron
Succeeded by	Normand Lapointe
Member of the National Assembly of Quebec for Beauce-Sud (Beauce; 1970–1973)
In office April 29, 1970 – April 5, 1979
Preceded by	Paul-Émile Allard
Succeeded by	Hermann Mathieu

Personal details
- Born: April 17, 1928 Saint-Prosper, Quebec, Canada
- Died: October 31, 2023 (aged 95) Saint-Georges, Quebec, Canada
- Party: Social Credit (1979–1980)
- Other political affiliations: Parti national populaire (1975–1979); Ralliement créditiste du Québec (1962–1975)
- Spouse: Pauline Lessard (m. 1960)
- Children: 4
- Occupation: Politician; accountant; executive

Fabien Roy (French pronunciation: [fabjɛ̃ ʁwa]; April 17, 1928 – October 31, 2023) was a Canadian politician who was active in Quebec in the 1970s. Roy was elected to the National Assembly of Quebec and the House of Commons of Canada, and advocated social credit theories of monetary reform.

== Background ==
Roy was born in Saint-Prosper, Quebec, the son of Anna-Marie (Goulet) and Fridolin Roy, an accountant. He studied accounting, sales management, and human resources in the Saint-Georges seminary, and commercial law, political economy and business administration at Université Laval. In 1980, following his departure from politics, he studied property valuation.

Roy was an accountant for the Saint-Prosper agricultural co-operative from 1945 to 1949, and secretary of the Federation of Co-operative Trucking (Quebec South district) from 1949 to 1952, and for the Sherbrooke district from 1952 to 1953. He founded the F. Roy Transports trucking company, which he ran from 1953 to 1962.

From 1962 to 1970, he was Director-General of a credit union in La Chaudière, and member of the administrative and executive councils of a Quebec credit union federation (Fédération des caisses d'établissement du Québec) from 1968 to 1970. In 1970, he was director of recruitment and sales for the federation. In 1960, he co-founded the Saint-Prosper Chamber of Commerce, and became president in 1963.

== Social Credit activist ==
From 1962 to 1968, he was president of the Dorchester riding federal Ralliement créditiste association, and regional organizer for the party in the 1962, 1963, 1965 and 1968 federal elections.

From 1964 to 1965, he was provincial vice-president of the party.

== Member of the legislature ==
Roy was elected to the Quebec National Assembly for Beauce riding in 1970, and held the post of chief whip of the Ralliement créditiste du Québec caucus from 1970 to 1972.

From 1972 to 1975, he was parliamentary leader of the party, and lost a bid to become leader at a February 1973 leadership convention. In the 1973 provincial election, he was returned to the National Assembly for the riding of Beauce-Sud.

Roy was president of the party from 1973 to 1974, but was expelled on November 3, 1975. He founded the Parti national populaire with former Liberal cabinet minister Jérôme Choquette on December 14, 1975, and was re-elected in the 1976 provincial election as the only PNP Member of the National Assembly.

== Federal politics ==
Roy was appointed leader of the federal Social Credit Party of Canada on March 30, 1979, and resigned his National Assembly seat on April 5, 1979.

Social Credit attempted to rally the separatist and nationalist vote: Canadian flags were absent at its campaign kick-off rally, and the party's slogan was C'est à notre tour ("It's our turn"), which was reminiscent of the popular separatist anthem Gens du pays that includes the chorus, "C'est à votre tour de vous laisser parler d'amour" (It's your turn to talk about love). The party focused its platform on constitutional change, promising to fight to abolish the federal government's rarely used right to disallow any provincial legislation, and stating that each province has a "right to choose its own destiny within Canada". Despite these attempts to win nationalist and separatist votes, the party was reduced to six seats in the 1979 federal election. Roy himself was elected from Beauce in eastern Quebec.

While his party provided some support to the minority Progressive Conservative Party of Canada government, Prime Minister Joe Clark was unwilling to reciprocate. He refused to recognize the Socreds as an official party (they had half the seats required for official status in the Commons) or form a coalition with them. He even convinced a Socred MP to cross the floor and join the Tories. When the PC government presented its December budget which included a controversial gas tax opposed by the Liberals and NDP, the Socreds demanded that the gas tax revenues be allocated to Quebec which Clark turned down. In reaction, when the NDP attached a rider to the budget bill declaring that the House opposed the budget, Roy instructed his MPs to abstain on the vote to adopt the amendment. The NDP amendment was approved, bringing down the Clark government and an election on February 18, 1980.

The abstention by Social Credit on this important vote contributed to the growing perception that the party had become irrelevant following the death of iconic leader Réal Caouette four years earlier. Roy and all other Socred candidates were defeated by Liberal challengers at the 1980 federal election, though Roy finished a close second in Beauce. The death of the Social Credit candidate in the riding of Frontenac resulted in the postponement of the election in that riding to March 24. Roy sought to return to the House of Commons in the ensuing by-election, but narrowly lost to the Liberal candidate. Roy resigned from the leadership on November 1, 1980. It would be the last time Social Credit would come remotely close to winning a seat in the Commons again.

== Retirement ==
Roy returned to business and community involvement, serving as director of Geoffrion Leclerc from 1981 to 1988, director of a community college (Cégep de Lévis-Lauzon) from 1984 to 1985, member of the Beauce economic council from 1981, as well as participating in Rotary Club activities and local celebrations. In 1987 he was one of the co-chairs of the 250th anniversary of the Beauce. He continued to campaign in many socio-economic organizations. He sat on the consultation committee of the Marius-Barbeau Museum.

In 1989, Fabien Roy became the founding president of the Village des défricheurs of Saint-Prosper.

Roy published his autobiography (Député à Québec et à Ottawa—mais toujours Beauceron !, ISBN 2-89448-421-6) in 2005.

== Personal life and death ==
On August 27, 1960, he married Pauline Lessard Eudore in the parish Assumption, Saint-Georges-de-Beauce. The couple had four children together.

Fabien Roy died in Saint-Georges, Quebec, on October 31, 2023, at the age of 95.

== See also ==
- National Assembly of Quebec
- List of third party leaders (Quebec)
- History of Quebec
