= Fédération Québécoise des Municipalités =

The Fédération Québécoise des Municipalités (FQM) is an organization representing municipalities in the Canadian province of Quebec. Its stated purpose is to provide political and strategic leadership to represent the interests of local and regional municipalities.

Most municipalities in the FQM are smaller, rural communities from Quebec's regions.

== See also ==
- List of micro-regional organizations
