= Beauce, Quebec =

Region of Quebec, Canada

Beauce, Quebec Beauce
- Historical and traditional region
- Beauce
- Interactive map of Beauce, Quebec
- Coordinates: 46°07′N 70°40′W
- Country: Canada
- Province: Quebec
- Region: Chaudière-Appalaches
- Demonym(s): Beauceron (French: Jarret noir, lit. 'Black hock')

Beauce (/boʊs/; French pronunciation: [bos]) is a historical and traditional region of Quebec, Canada, located south of Quebec City. Most of it is part of the administrative region of Chaudière-Appalaches. It corresponds approximately to the regional county municipalities of Beauce-Sartigan, Beauce-Centre and La Nouvelle-Beauce, and its major communities are Saint-Georges, Sainte-Marie, Beauceville, Saint-Joseph-de-Beauce and Saint-Victor.

== Etymology ==
The first record of the name goes back to 1739. "Nouvelle Beauce" (New Beauce) designated the seigneuries granted earlier along the Chaudière River and which would later become the current cities of Sainte-Marie, Saint-Joseph-de-Beauce, Beauceville, and Saint-Georges, as well as several other communities which would detach from these territories.

According to accounts from Governor Charles de Beauharnois de la Boische and Intendant Gilles Hocquart, "Beauce" was chosen by seigneurs Joseph de Fleury de La Gorgendière, Pierre de Rigaud de Vaudreuil and Thomas-Jacques Taschereau to develop the potential of colonization, as the name recalls the French Beauce, a region renowned for its wheat production. In 1829, the name represented a county extending to the Canada–US border with Maine.

Later, Beauce would also be the name of administrative, municipal, electoral, school and judicial subdivisions, sometimes with different borders. Today, residents of neighbouring regional county municipalities consider themselves "Beaucerons" (masculine) or "Beauceronnes" (feminine) because of the former administrative links.

Historically, Beaucerons have also been known under the nickname of "Jarrets noirs" (black hocks). Travelling to Quebec City took up to one week, and because of the hilly roads and their conditions, they would often have to push their farm carts. They would get their legs dirty and arrive at the destination with their hocks black. It may also have referred to the hocks of their horses being black when they got to Quebec City because of the abundance of peaty bogs or wetlands on the journey there; the horses' legs would sink up to their hocks and become covered in the muck and therefore be blackened.

== Economy ==
Beauce has over 50% of sugar maples and sugar shacks in Quebec, which produces the most maple syrup in Canada as well as the world. Exclusively agricultural for many years, Beauce's economy slowly diversified in the first half of the 20th century through forestry, wood processing, and the leather and textile industries. In 1951, the industrial production value became for the first time superior to agriculture, likely due to strong local entrepreneurship and cheap labour. Today's economy relies especially on small and medium enterprises in the industries of furniture, food, clothing, printing and metalworking. It is known as Quebec's entrepreneurial heartland.

== Notable people ==
- Marius Barbeau, ethnographer
- Jesse Bélanger, NHL hockey player
- Gilles Bernier, Canadian politician
- Maxime Bernier, Canadian politician
- Joseph Bolduc, Canadian politician
- Roch Carrier, author
- Thomas Chabot, NHL hockey player
- William Chapman, poet
- Robert Cliche, Quebec politician
- Marcel Dutil, businessman
- Clermont Pépin, composer
- Édouard Lacroix businessman and politician
- Maveric Lamoureux, junior hockey player
- Laurent Noël, Catholic bishop
- Jacques Poulin, novelist
- Marie-Philip Poulin, hockey player
- George Pozer, businessman
- Fabien Roy, Canadian politician
- Mathieu Roy, NHL hockey player
- Alex Tanguay, NHL hockey player
- Elzéar-Alexandre Taschereau, clergyman
- Henri Elzéar Taschereau, judge
- Stéphane Veilleux, NHL hockey player

== See also ==
- List of Quebec regions
- Chaudière-Appalaches
- Beauce-Centre Regional County Municipality
- Beauce-Sartigan Regional County Municipality, Quebec
- La Nouvelle-Beauce Regional County Municipality, Quebec
- Tour de Beauce
