= Taschereau =

The Taschereaus were a prominent family from the region of Touraine in France, who then settled in Beauce, Quebec in the 1720s. The family was active in French political life in 17th and 18th century and in the politics of Quebec from the late 18th century to mid-20th century.

Taschereau may also refer to:

== People ==
=== Taschereau family ===
==== In France ====
- Gabriel Taschereau de Baudry (1673-1755), mayor of Tours, lieutenant general of the police

==== In Canada ====
- Thomas-Jacques Taschereau (1680-1749) - settler of New France, originator of the family
  - Gabriel-Elzéar Taschereau, member of the Legislative Assembly of Lower Canada (1792-96) and of the Legislative Assembly of Lower Canada (1796-1809)
    - Jean-Thomas Taschereau (1778–1832), member of the Legislative Assembly of Lower Canada (1800-27)
      - Jean-Thomas Taschereau (judge), justice of the Supreme Court of Canada (1875-78)
        - Louis-Alexandre Taschereau, 14th Premier of Quebec (1920-1936), member of the Legislative Assembly of Quebec (1900-1936)
          - Robert Taschereau, justice of the Supreme Court of Canada (1940-1967), Chief Justice of Canada in 1963-67
        - Henri-Thomas Taschereau, member of the House of Commons of Canada (1872-78), Chief Justice of Quebec (1907-09)
      - Elzéar-Alexandre Taschereau, Cardinal of the Catholic Church (1886-98), Archbishop of Quebec (1871-98)
    - Thomas-Pierre-Joseph Taschereau, a military officer and member of the Legislative Assembly of Lower Canada (1818-26)
      - Pierre-Elzéar Taschereau, member of the Legislative Assembly of Lower Canada (1830-35), member of Legislative Assembly of the Province of Canada (1844-45)
        - Henri-Elzéar Taschereau, justice of the Supreme Court of Canada (1878-1906), Chief Justice of Canada in 1902-1906
      - Joseph-André Taschereau, member of the Legislative Assembly of Lower Canada (1835-38), member of Legislative Assembly of the Province of Canada (1845-47)
      - Thomas-Jacques Taschereau, a notary
        - Thomas Linière Taschereau, member of the House of Commons of Canada (1891-93)
    - Antoine-Charles Taschereau, member of the Legislative Assembly of Lower Canada (1830-38), military officer, member of Legislative Assembly of the Province of Canada (1841-44)
  - Marie-Anne-Louise Taschereau, nun and leader of the Ursulines in Quebec

=== Unrelated to the family ===
- Jules-Joseph-Taschereau Frémont, mayor of Quebec City (1890-94), member of the House of Commons of Canada (1891-96)

== Places ==
- Taschereau, Quebec
  - Lake Taschereau, which is located in the municipality
- Taschereau (electoral district)
- Taschereau Boulevard
- Taschereau Bridge
- Taschereau River (rivière du Loup tributary), flowing through Saint-Théophile, Chaudière-Appalaches, Quebec
- Taschereau River (Bell River), a tributary of Bell River flowing in the region of Abitibi-Témiscamingue, Quebec

== Other uses ==
- Kellock–Taschereau Commission
