= Index of Quebec-related articles =

Articles related to Quebec include:

== 0–9 ==
- 1980 Quebec referendum
- 1995 Quebec referendum
- 20th-century municipal history of Quebec
- 21st-century municipal history of Quebec

== A ==
- Aboriginal peoples in Quebec
- Architecture of Quebec
- Autoroute (Quebec)
- An Act to promote the French language in Québec
- Anglo-Quebecker
- Anglosphere
- Anglicism
- Association québécoise de linguistique

== B ==
- Bibliothèque et Archives nationales du Québec

== C ==
- Canadian identity
- Canadiens
- Cabinet of Quebec
- Canada East
- Canadiens
- Charter of the French Language
- Cinema of Quebec
- CIREQ
- Cirque du Soleil
- Civil Code of Quebec
- Coalition New Democratic Party of Quebec – Regroupement des militants syndicaux candidates, 1976 Quebec provincial election
- Coat of Arms of Quebec
- College Jean-Eudes
- Cuisine of Quebec
- Culture of Quebec
- Royal Commission on Bilingualism and Biculturalism

== D ==
- Demographics of Quebec
- Demographic history of Quebec
- Demolinguistic descriptors used in Canada
- Language demographics of Quebec
- Céline Dion

== E ==
- Economy of Quebec
- English-speaking Quebecers
- English Canada

== F ==
- Family Compact
- Fête nationale du Québec
- Federalism in Quebec
- Flag of Quebec
- Français québécois
- French Canada
- French Canadians
- Francophone
- French Canadian
- French language in Canada
- French-speaking Quebecer
- Franglais
- Front de libération du Québec

== G ==
- Gens du pays
- Geography of Quebec

== H ==
- History of Quebec
- History of Quebec French
- Holidays of Quebec
- Humor in Quebec
- Hydro-Québec

== J ==
- Joual

== L ==
- La Francophonie
- Laurentian Mountains
- Languages of Canada
- Law on the state education
- Legislative Council of Quebec
- List of lieutenant governors of Quebec
- List of National Historic Sites of Canada in Quebec
- List of protected areas of Quebec
- List of Quebec authors
- List of Quebec counties
- List of Quebec county regional municipalities
- List of Quebec festivals
- List of Quebec general elections
- List of Quebec leaders of the Opposition
- List of Quebec media
- List of Quebec premiers
- List of Quebec regions
- List of Quebec television series
- List of Quebec universities
- List of Quebecers
- List of radio stations in Quebec
- List of towns in Quebec
- Lower Canada

== M ==
- Meech Lake Accord
- Music of Quebec

== N ==
- Name of Quebec City
- National Assembly of Quebec
- National question (Quebec)
- 1980 Quebec referendum
- 1995 Quebec referendum
- Nunavik
- Nationalisme québécois

== O ==
- October Crisis
- Œ
- Office québécois de la langue française
- Official bilingualism in Canada

== P ==
- Parlement Jeunesse du Québec
- Linguistic prescription
- Plains of Abraham
- Politics of Quebec
- Poutine
- Pre-20th-century municipal history of Quebec
- Premier of Quebec

== Q ==
- Québécois
- Québécois people
- QMJHL
- Quebec Act
- Quebec Charter of Rights and Freedoms
- Quebec English
- Quebec education system
- Quebec folklore
- Quebec French
- Quebec French lexicon
- Quebec French phonology
- Quebec French profanity
- Quebec Selection Certificate
- Quebec sovereigntism
- Le Québécois
- Quebecer (disambiguation)
- Quiet Revolution
- Quebec diaspora
- Quebec nationalism

== R ==
- Ginette Reno
- Roman du terroir
- Rest of Canada

== S ==
- Salon du livre anarchiste
- Same-sex marriage in Quebec
- Société d'astronomie de Montréal
- Société Radio-Canada
- Snowmobile
- Standard French

== T ==
- Joseph-Charles Taché
- Étienne-Paschal Taché
- Gabriel-Elzéar Taschereau
- Henri-Thomas Taschereau
- Jean-Thomas Taschereau (jurist)
- Joseph-André Taschereau
- Marie-Anne-Louise Taschereau
- Thomas-Pierre-Joseph Taschereau
- Television of Quebec

== See also ==
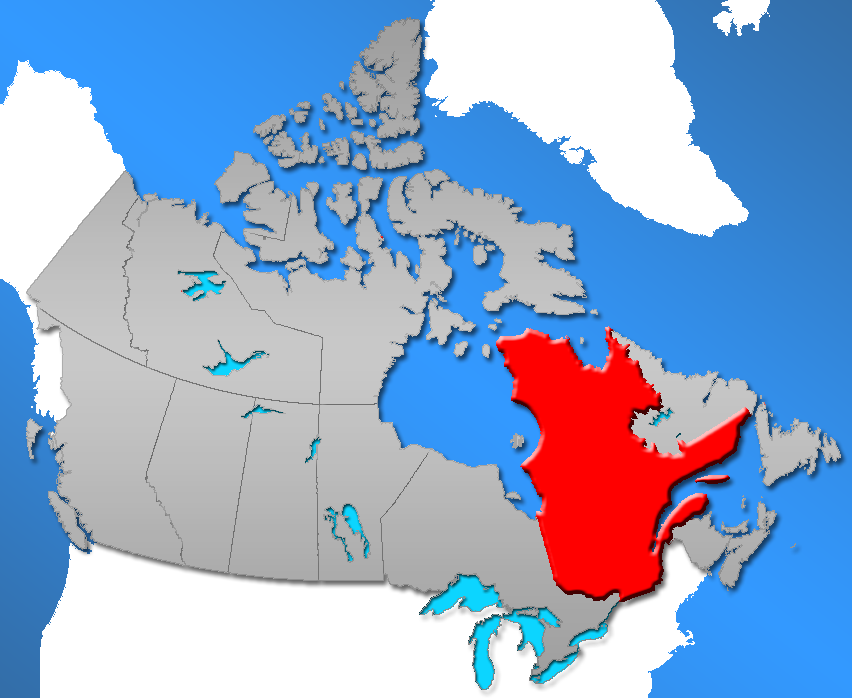
Lists of topics by provinces and territories
