= Antoine-Charles Taschereau =

Politician in Lower Canada and Canada East (1797–1862)

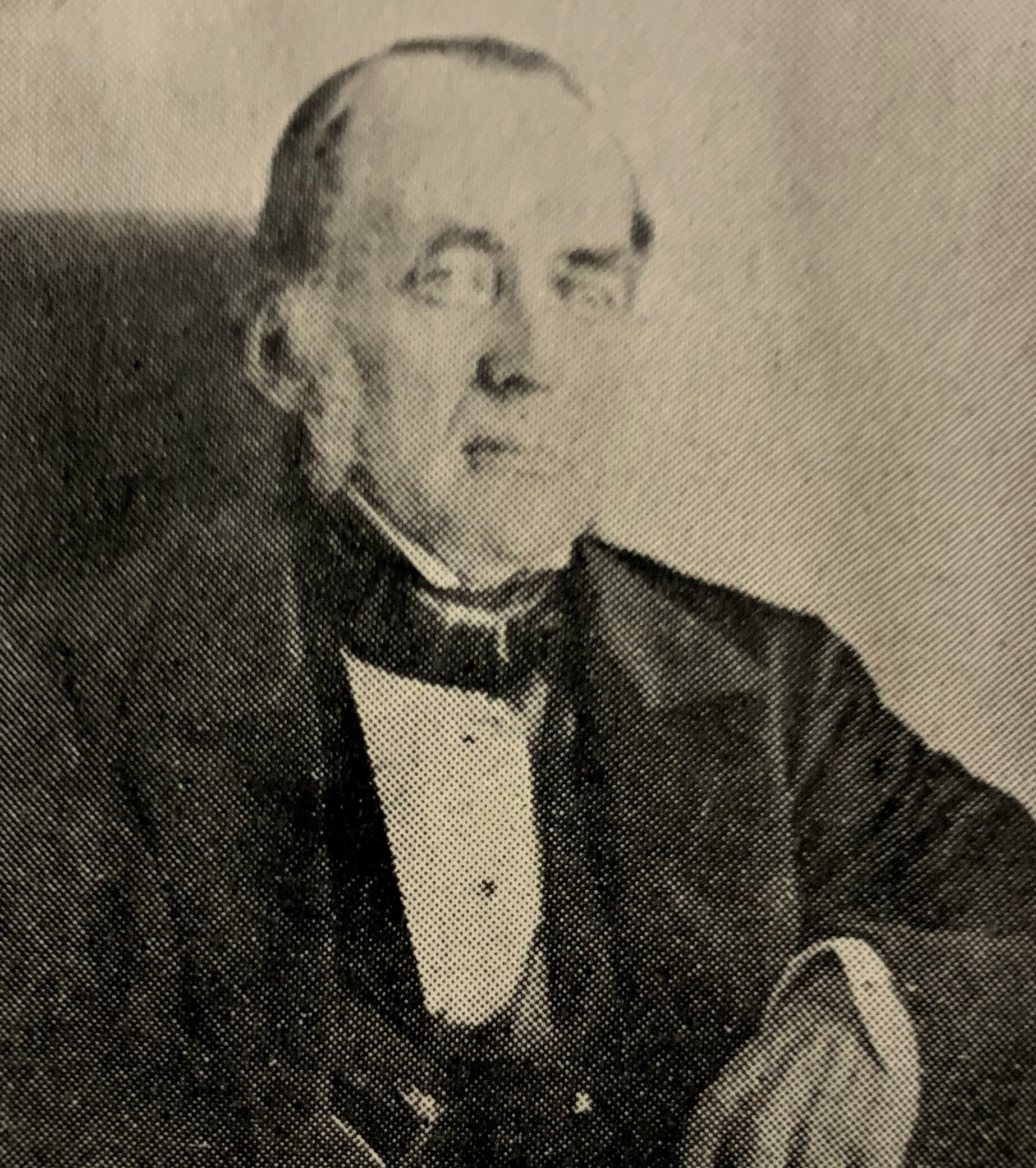
- Antoine-Charles Taschereau, c. 1860

Member of the Legislative Assembly of Lower Canada for Beauce (two-member constituency)
- In office 1830 – 1838 (two elections) Serving with: Pierre-Elzéar Taschereau (1830–1835); Joseph-André Taschereau (1835–1838)
- Preceded by: New district
- Succeeded by: None; Constitution suspended

Member of the Legislative Assembly of the Province of Canada for Dorchester
- In office 1841–1844
- Preceded by: New position
- Succeeded by: Pierre-Elzéar Taschereau

Personal details
- Born: October 26, 1797 Quebec City, Lower Canada
- Died: June 11, 1862 (aged 64) Deschambault, Quebec
- Resting place: Deschambault parish church
- Party: Lower Canada: Parti patriote Province of Canada: Anti-unionist; French-Canadian Group
- Spouse: Adélaïde Fleury de La Gorgendière
- Relations: Gabriel-Elzéar Taschereau (father); Antoine Juchereau Duchesnay (father-in-law); Thomas-Pierre-Joseph Taschereau (half-brother); Jean-Thomas Taschereau (half-brother); Pierre-Elzéar Taschereau (nephew); Joseph-André Taschereau (nephew
- Children: 12; 6 sons, 5 daughters, 1 stillborn
- Education: Petit Séminaire de Montréal (1809–1811); Séminaire de Nicolet (1812–1816)
- Occupation: Customs collector and land agent

Military service
- Allegiance: Britain
- Branch/service: Lower Canada militia
- Rank: Lieutenant-Colonel
- Unit: 2nd Battalion, Dorchester Regiment
- Battles/wars: War of 1812

Antoine-Charles Taschereau (October 26, 1797 – June 11, 1862) was a government official, land developer, and political figure in Lower Canada and Canada East, Province of Canada (now Quebec). He represented Beauce in the Legislative Assembly of Lower Canada from 1830 to 1838, sometimes voting with the government and sometimes with the Parti patriote, including voting for the Ninety-Two Resolutions. He opposed the union of Lower Canada and Upper Canada into the Province of Canada. Following the union, he represented Dorchester in the Legislative Assembly of the Province of Canada from 1841 to 1844, as an anti-unionist and member of the French-Canadian Group.

== Family and life ==
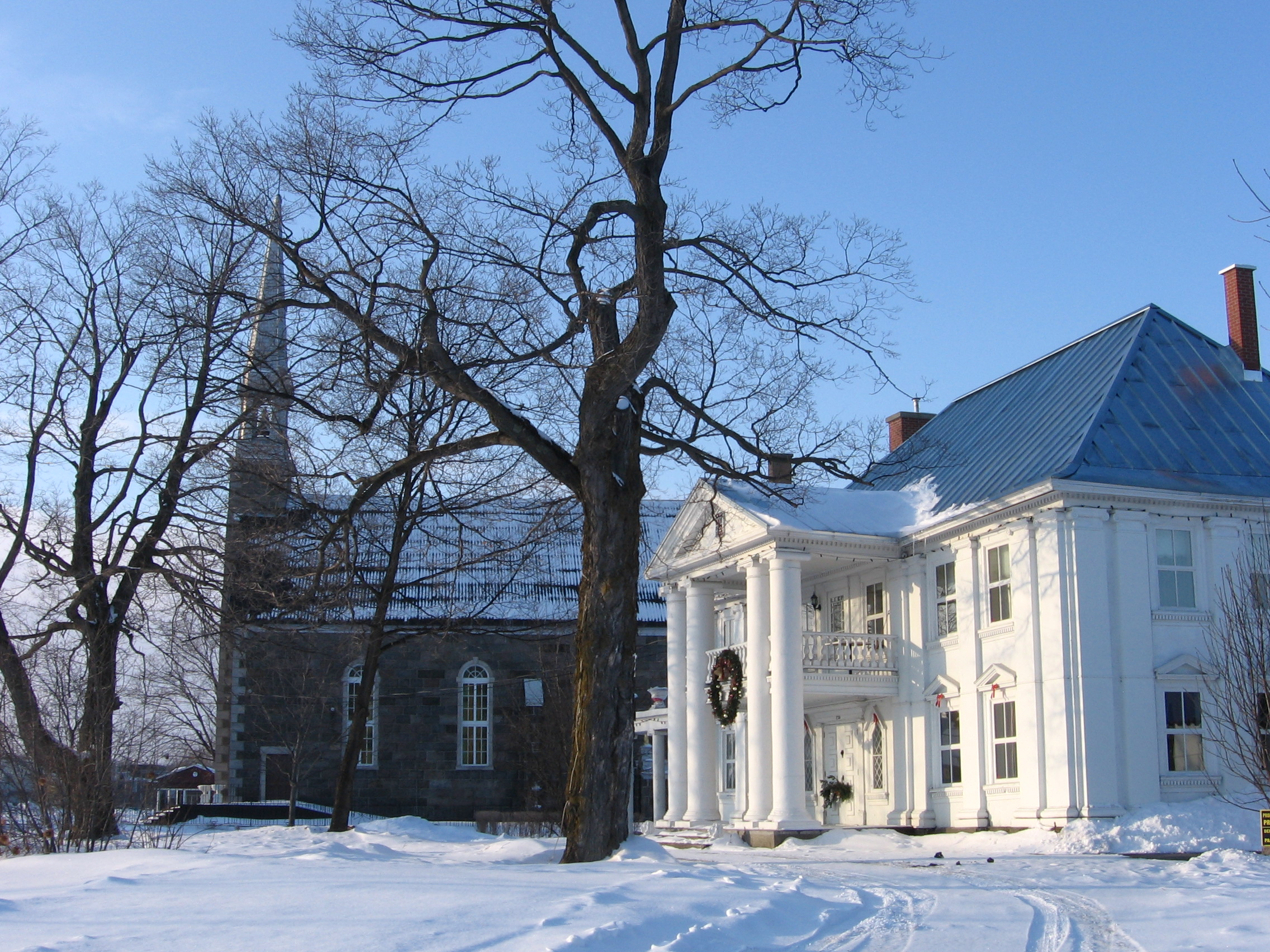
Taschereau mansion and Ste-Anne chapel, Ste-Marie-de-la-Nouvelle-Beauce

Taschereau was born in Quebec City, the son of seigneur Gabriel-Elzéar Taschereau and Louise-Françoise Juchereau Duchesnay, who was the daughter of Antoine Juchereau Duchesnay. Both his father and grandfather were active in politics, being members of the Legislative Assembly of Lower Canada.

He was educated at the Collège Saint-Raphaël and the Séminaire de Nicolet. He married Adélaïde Fleury de La Gorgendière in 1819. The couple had twelve children.

Taschereau was a member of the large and influential Taschereau family, descended from Thomas-Jacques Taschereau, seigneur of Sainte-Marie-de-la-Nouvelle Beauce. He was half-brother of Jean-Thomas and Thomas-Pierre-Joseph Taschereau. Jean-Thomas was a member of the Legislative Assembly of Lower Canada and later the Legislative Council of Lower Canada. Thomas-Pierre-Joseph was a member of the Legislative Council.

He was the uncle of Joseph-André and Pierre-Elzéar Taschereau. Both of them were members of the Legislative Assembly of Lower Canada, and later the Legislative Assembly of the Province of Canada.

Taschereau lived for many years at the family seigneury at Sainte-Marie-de-Beauce. He was an officer in the local Dorchester Regiment of the Lower Canada militia, eventually becoming lieutenant-colonel of the 2nd Battalion.

== Business career ==
Taschereau was involved in agricultural and forestry development in the Beauce area, particularly in Linière township. In 1821, he was named customs officer at Sainte-Marie-de-la-Nouvelle-Beauce, and then customs collector in 1822. In 1849, he was named customs collector at Quebec City. He also served as land agent, postmaster, and school trustee.

== Political career ==
=== Lower Canada ===
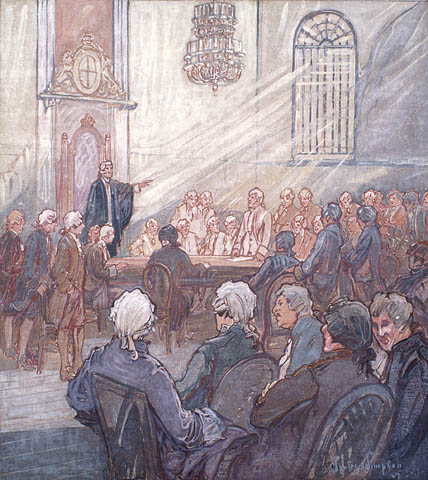
Legislative Assembly of Lower Canada, meeting in the Bishop's Chapel, Quebec

In 1830, at the age of 33, Taschereau was elected to the Legislative Assembly of Lower Canada for the district of Beauce, as a supporter of the Parti patriote, which at that time supported the seigneurial system. The district elected two members, and his fellow member was his nephew Pierre-Elzéar Taschereau, then aged 25. Antoine-Charles had broad support throughout the riding, including from some English-speaking voters. In the Assembly, he sometimes voted with the Government party, which supported the government of the Governor-General, but sometimes voted with the Patriot Party, which opposed the government. In the session of 1834, Taschereau was the chair of the committee which drafted the Ninety-Two Resolutions, which called on the British government to make substantial changes to the government of Lower Canada. The Legislative Assembly adopted the Resolutions by a large majority.

In the lead-up to the Lower Canada Rebellion in 1837–1838, Taschereau began to draw away from the Parti patriote, possibly because the patriotes began to be more radical and less supportive of the seigneurial system. Following the Rebellion, the British government suspended the constitution of Lower Canada, including the Parliament of Lower Canada, ending Taschereau's membership in the Legislative Assembly.

=== Province of Canada ===
Following the rebellion in Lower Canada, and the similar rebellion in 1837 in Upper Canada (now Ontario), the British government decided to merge the two provinces into a single province, as recommended by Lord Durham in the Durham Report. The Union Act, 1840, passed by the British Parliament, abolished the two provinces and their separate parliaments, and created the Province of Canada, with a single parliament for the entire province, composed of an elected Legislative Assembly and an appointed Legislative Council. The Governor General retained a strong position in the government.

Taschereau stood for election in the riding of Dorchester for a seat in the new Legislative Assembly. His opponent was his own nephew, Joseph-André Taschereau, who was one of the few French-Canadians who tended to support the British provincial government at that time. Antoine-Charles was elected, soundly defeating Joseph-André. At the first session, he opposed the union of Upper Canada and Lower Canada, as well as the policies of the Governor-General, Lord Sydenham. He was a member of the French-Canadian Group, which supported the efforts of the Reformers, Louis-Hippolyte LaFontaine and Robert Baldwin, to ensure greater French-Canadian representation in the government.

Taschereau did not stand for election in the general election of 1844.

== Death ==
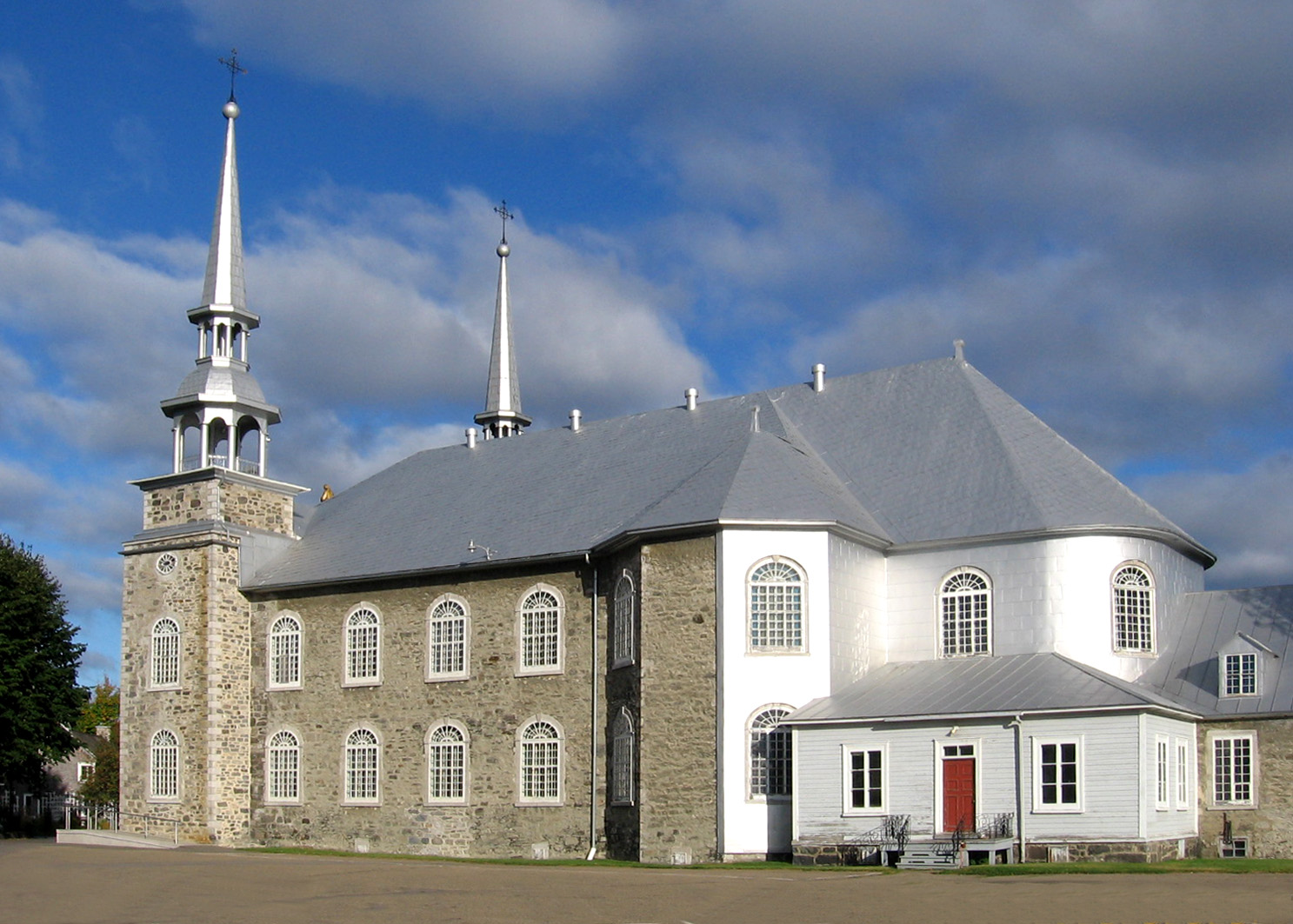
Deschambault parish church

He died in Deschambault at the age of 64, after several years of ill-health. He was buried in the parish cemetery of Deschambault.

== See also ==
1st Parliament of the Province of Canada
