= Dorchester (Province of Canada electoral district) =

Electoral district in former Province of Canada

Province of Canada electoral district

Defunct pre-Confederation electoral district
- Legislature: Legislative Assembly of the Province of Canada
- District created: 1841
- District abolished: 1867
- First contested: 1841
- Last contested: 1863

Dorchester was an electoral district of the Legislative Assembly of the Parliament of the Province of Canada, in Canada East. It was created in 1841, by the merger of two previous electoral districts of the Legislative Assembly of Lower Canada, Dorchester and Beauce. The new district was south of Quebec City, and was represented by one member in the Legislative Assembly.

In 1853, the Parliament of the Province of Canada expanded the size of the Legislative Assembly. Canada East's representation increased from forty-two members to sixty-five members. In the redistribution of seats, the Dorchester riding was split into two ridings, with the new electoral district of Beauce carved off from Dorchester. The new electoral map came into force for the next general elections, in 1854.

Dorchester electoral district was abolished in 1867, upon the creation of Canada and the province of Quebec.

== Boundaries ==
=== 1841 to 1854 ===
The Union Act, 1840, passed by the British Parliament, merged the two provinces of Upper Canada and Lower Canada into the Province of Canada, with a single Parliament. The separate parliaments of Lower Canada and Upper Canada were abolished.

The Union Act provided that while many of the pre-existing electoral boundaries of Lower Canada and Upper Canada would continue to be used in the new Parliament, some electoral districts would be defined directly by the Union Act itself. Dorchester was one of those new electoral districts. The Union Act merged two previous electoral districts, the County of Dorchester and the County of Beauce, to create a new district, also called Dorchester.

Under the previous legislation, enacted in 1829, the former district of Dorchester had been based on the seigniory of Lauzon, on the south shore of the Saint Lawrence, near Lévis.

The former district of Beauce had been immediately to the south east of the former district of Dorchester, and was defined as follows:

The County of Beauce shall be bounded on the north east by the County of Bellechasse, as above described, on the south west by part of the Seigniory of Saint Giles, by the Townships of Broughton, Tring and part of Shenley, to the south eastern boundary line of the Seigniory of Aubert Gallion, thence along the said south eastern boundary of the said last mentioned Seigniory of the River Chaudière thence southerly up the middle of the said River Chaudière and through the middle of the Lake Megantick, to the entrance of Arnold River, thence up the said River to the southern boundary of the Province, on the north west by the County of Dorchester, and on the south east by the southern boundary of the Province; which County so bounded, comprises the Seigniories of Jolliet, Saint Etienne, Sainte Marie, Saint Joseph, Vaudreuil, Aubert Gallion Aubin de l'Isle, the Townships of Frampton, Cranbourne, Watford, Jersey, Marlow, Rixborough, Spalding, Ditchfield and Woburn, and that part of Clinton, east of Arnold River.

The effect of the Union Act provision was to merge those two sets of boundaries into one district. The Dorchester electoral district was thus south of Quebec City, between the Saint Lawrence and the border with the United States, in the current Chaudière-Appalaches administrative region.

=== 1854 to 1867 ===
In 1853, the Parliament of the Province of Canada expanded the Legislative Assembly. Canada East went from forty-two seats to sixty-five seats. As part of the redistribution of seats, Dorchester was split into two seats. The northern portion of the riding continued to be named Dorchester, while the southern portion was split into a new riding of Beauce.

The new boundaries for Dorchester were as follows:

10. The County of Dorchester shall be bounded on the north-east by the County of Bellechasse as above described, on the south-east by the province line until it meets the sources of the River Metgermette, on the south by the said River Metgermette as far as the Township of Linière, on the north-west by the north-eastern and northern line of the said Township of Linière, the south-western line of the Townships of Watford, Cranbourne and Frampton, the south-eastern limits of the Parish of Sainte Marguerite, and of the Parish of Sainte Hémédine [sic], the south-western limits of the said Parish of Sainte Hémédine [sic], the south-eastern and south-western limits of the Parish of Saint Isidore as far as the River Chaudière, and on the south-west of the said River Chaudière by the south-eastern, south-western and north-western limits of the parish of St. Bernard, and on the north-west by the said County of Lévis as above described; the said County so bounded comprising the Parishes of Saint Anselme, Saint Isidore, Sainte Claire, Sainte Marguerite, Saint Bernard, Sainte Hémédine [sic], part of the Townships of Buckland and Metgermette, and the Townships of Frampton, Standon and its augmentation, Cranbourne, Ware and Watford.

== Members of the Legislative Assembly (1841–1867) ==
Dorchester was a single-member constituency, represented by one member in the Legislative Assembly.

The following were the members of the Legislative Assembly from Dorchester. The party affiliations are based on the biographies of individual members given by the National Assembly of Quebec, as well as votes in the Legislative Assembly. "Party" was a fluid concept, especially during the early years of the Province of Canada.

Parliament	Member	Years in Office	Party
1st Parliament; 1841–1844	Antoine-Charles Taschereau	1841–1844	Anti-unionist; French-Canadian Group
2nd Parliament of the Province of Canada; 1844–1847	Pierre-Elzéar Taschereau (Note: Died in office, July 25, 1845: Côté, Political Appointments and Elections, p. 60, note (62).)	1844–1845	French-Canadian Group
2nd Parliament of the Province of Canada; 1844–1847	Joseph-André Taschereau (Note: Elected in by-election, September 15, 1845; resigned seat on judicial appointment, May 22, 1847: Côté, Political Appointments and Elections, p. 60, note (62).)	1845–1847 (by-election)	"British" Tory
2nd Parliament of the Province of Canada; 1844–1847	François-Xavier Lemieux (Note: Elected in by-election July 12, 1847: Côté, Political Appointments and Elections, p. 60, note (62).)	1847	French-Canadian Group
3rd Parliament; 1848–1851	François-Xavier Lemieux	1848–1851	French-Canadian Group
4th Parliament; 1851–1854	François-Xavier Lemieux	1848–1851	Ministerialist
5th Parliament; 1854–1857	Barthélemy Pouliot	1854–1857	Bleu
6th Parliament; 1858–1861	Hector-Louis Langevin	1858–1867	Bleu
7th Parliament; 1861–1863	Hector-Louis Langevin	1858–1867	Bleu
8th Parliament; 1863–1867	Hector-Louis Langevin	1858–1867	Confederation; Bleu

== Abolition ==
The Dorchester riding was abolished on July 1, 1867, when the British North America Act, 1867 came into force, splitting the Province of Canada into Quebec and Ontario. It was succeeded by electoral districts of the same name in the House of Commons of Canada and the Legislative Assembly of Quebec.

== See also ==
- List of elections in the Province of Canada
