= Beauce (Province of Canada electoral district) =

Electoral district in Province of Canada

Coordinates: 46.192°N 70.771°W

Province of Canada electoral district

Defunct pre-Confederation electoral district
- Legislature: Legislative Assembly of the Province of Canada
- District created: 1853
- District abolished: 1867
- First contested: 1854
- Last contested: 1863

Beauce was an electoral district of the Legislative Assembly of the Parliament of the Province of Canada in Canada East, in a rural area south of Quebec City bordering on the United States. From 1841 to 1854, Beauce county had been included in the riding of Dorchester. In 1853, the provincial Parliament enacted a redistribution statute which enlarged the Legislative Assembly, from forty-two seats to sixty-five. The Beauce area was split off from Dorchester and made a separate riding. It was represented by one member in the Legislative Assembly.

The electoral district was abolished in 1867, upon the creation of Canada and Quebec.

== Boundaries ==
The electoral district of Beauce was in a rural area south of Quebec City, bordering on the United States. Its territory is now included in the regional county municipalities of Beauce-Sartigan, Beauce-Centre and La Nouvelle-Beauce.

The county of Beauce had been an electoral district in the Legislative Assembly of Lower Canada from 1829 to 1838, when the Lower Canada Parliament was suspended after the Lower Canada Rebellion. The Union Act, 1840, passed by the British Parliament, merged the two provinces of Lower Canada and Upper Canada into the Province of Canada, with a single Parliament. The separate parliaments of Lower Canada and Upper Canada were abolished. The Union Act provided that Beauce would be merged with the county of Dorchester to form the Dorchester riding, represented by one member.

In 1853, the Parliament of the Province of Canada expanded the Legislative Assembly, to take effect in the next general elections in 1854. Canada East's representation was expanded from forty-two seats to sixty-five seats. As part of the redistribution, the Beauce region was split off from the Dorchester riding and created as a separate riding. The boundaries of the new riding of Beauce were as follows:

1(11) The County of Beauce shall be bounded on the north-east by the County of Dorchester, on the east by the province line, on the west by the limits of the District of Quebec as far as the Township of Colraine, and on the north-west by the southern limits of the Townships of Colraine, Thetford and Broughton, again on the south-west by the south-eastern limits of the Township of Broughton and of the Parish of Saint Sylvestre, as far as the County of Dorchester, and on the north-east by the said County of Dorchester; the said County so bounded comprising the Parishes of Saint Elzéar, Sainte Marie, Saint Joseph, Saint Frederick, Saint François, Saint George, the Seigniory of Aubin-Delisle, part of the Townships of Metgermette and Clinton, the Kennebec Road Settlements, and the Townships of Jersey, Linière, Marlow, Rixborough, Spaulding, Ditchfield, Woburn, Gayhurst, Dorset, Shenley, Aylmer, Price, Lambton, Forsyth, Adstock and Tring.

== Members of the Legislative Assembly (1854–1867) ==
Beauce was a single-member constituency, represented by one member in the Legislative Assembly.

The following were the members of the Legislative Assembly for Beauce. The party affiliations are based on the biographies of individual members given by the National Assembly of Quebec, as well as votes in the Legislative Assembly. "Party" was a fluid concept, especially during the early years of the Province of Canada.

Parliament	Members	Years in Office	Party
5th Parliament; 1854–1857	Dunbar Ross	1854–1861	English Ministerialist
6th Parliament; 1858–1861	Dunbar Ross	1854–1861	English Liberal
7th Parliament; 1861–1863	Henri-Elzéar Taschereau	1861-1867	Bleu
8th Parliament; 1863–1867	Henri-Elzéar Taschereau	1861-1867	Anti-Confederation; Bleu

== Abolition ==
The district was abolished on July 1, 1867, when the British North America Act, 1867 came into force, creating Canada and splitting the Province of Canada into Quebec and Ontario. It was succeeded by electoral districts of the same name in the House of Commons of Canada and the Legislative Assembly of Quebec.

== See also ==
- List of elections in the Province of Canada
