= Quebec County =

Quebec County may refer to:

- Quebec County (Province of Canada electoral district)
- Quebec County (federal electoral district), a former federal riding from 1867 to 1925
- an alternative name for Québec-Comté (provincial electoral district), a former provincial riding from 1867 to 1966
- County of Quebec, a former riding of Lower Canada, see Electoral districts of Lower Canada
- Quebec County, Quebec, a historic county in the province of Quebec
