= Pierre-Antoine Dorion =

Canadian politician

Pierre-Antoine Dorion (ca. 1789 – September 12, 1850) was a businessman and political figure in Lower Canada.

He was born in Lower Canada around 1789. He worked as a clerk in a store at Sainte-Anne-de-la-Pérade for Pierre Bureau and then established himself as a lumber merchant there. In 1814, he married Bureau's daughter, Geneviève. Dorion was selected as a school trustee at Sainte-Anne-de-la-Pérade in 1829, later becoming an inspector of schools. In 1830, he was elected to the Legislative Assembly of Lower Canada for Champlain and was reelected in 1834, supporting the Parti Patriote. He was named commissioner for the construction of a bridge over the Sainte-Anne River. Dorion voted in support of the Ninety-Two Resolutions. In 1837, he became a justice of the peace. His term in office ended when the assembly was dissolved during the events leading up to the Lower Canada Rebellion; he did not return to politics afterwards. He died at Drummondville in 1850.

His sons Antoine-Aimé and Jean-Baptiste-Éric went on to careers in politics. His son Vincislas-Paul-Wilfrid was also involved in politics and later became a judge.

Political offices
New district	MLA, District of Champlain; 1829–1838; With: Olivier Trudel, Patriote	Vacant Constitution suspended in 1838
