= Saint-Jules =

Saint-Jules is the name of several communities. It may refer to:

== Canada ==
- the former Saint-Jules, Quebec which amalgamated into the municipality of Cascapédia–Saint-Jules in 1999
- Saint-Jules, Quebec, a parish municipality
