= Janvier Grondin =

Canadian politician

MNA for Beauce-Nord
- In office May 1, 2003 – 2012
- Preceded by: Normand Poulin
- Succeeded by: André Spénard

Personal details
- Born: June 16, 1947 (age 78) Saint-Jules, Quebec
- Party: Action démocratique du Québec 2003-2012; CAQ 2012-
- Spouse: Francine Bissonnette

Janvier Grondin (born June 16, 1947 in Saint-Jules, Quebec) is a former politician in the province of Quebec, Canada. He represented the Beauce-Nord district at the National Assembly of Quebec until 2012 as a member of the Coalition Avenir Québec. He previously represented the riding as a member of the now defunct Action démocratique du Québec (ADQ), before the ADQ merged with the CAQ in January 2012.

Prior to being elected, he served as mayor of Saint-Jules (Beauce) from 1993 to 2003. He was also an administrator for the Union des producteurs agricoles (UPA), the vice-president of Régie Intermunicipale Beauce, the president of the CLSC Beauce-Centre and an administrator for the Saint-Jules Chamber of Commerce

Grondin was first elected as a Member of the National Assembly in the 2003 election, with 46% of the vote. The Liberal incumbent Normand Poulin finished second with 38% of the vote.

In 2006, Grondin claimed that an influential Liberal supporter tried to convince him not to run in the 2007 election in order to favour the election of Liberal candidate Claude Drouin. Grondin claims that a well paid job in the public service, which he declined, was offered to him. Liberal leader and Premier of Quebec Jean Charest denied the accusation and dared Grondin to tell the public who made the offer. Grondin said that if Charest called him personally, he would be glad to do so, but Charest refused.

Grondin was re-elected with 63% of the vote in the 2007 election (defeating Liberal Claude Drouin) and with 50% of the vote in 2008 election.
