= Beauce-Nord =

Provincial electoral district in Quebec, Canada

Quebec electoral district
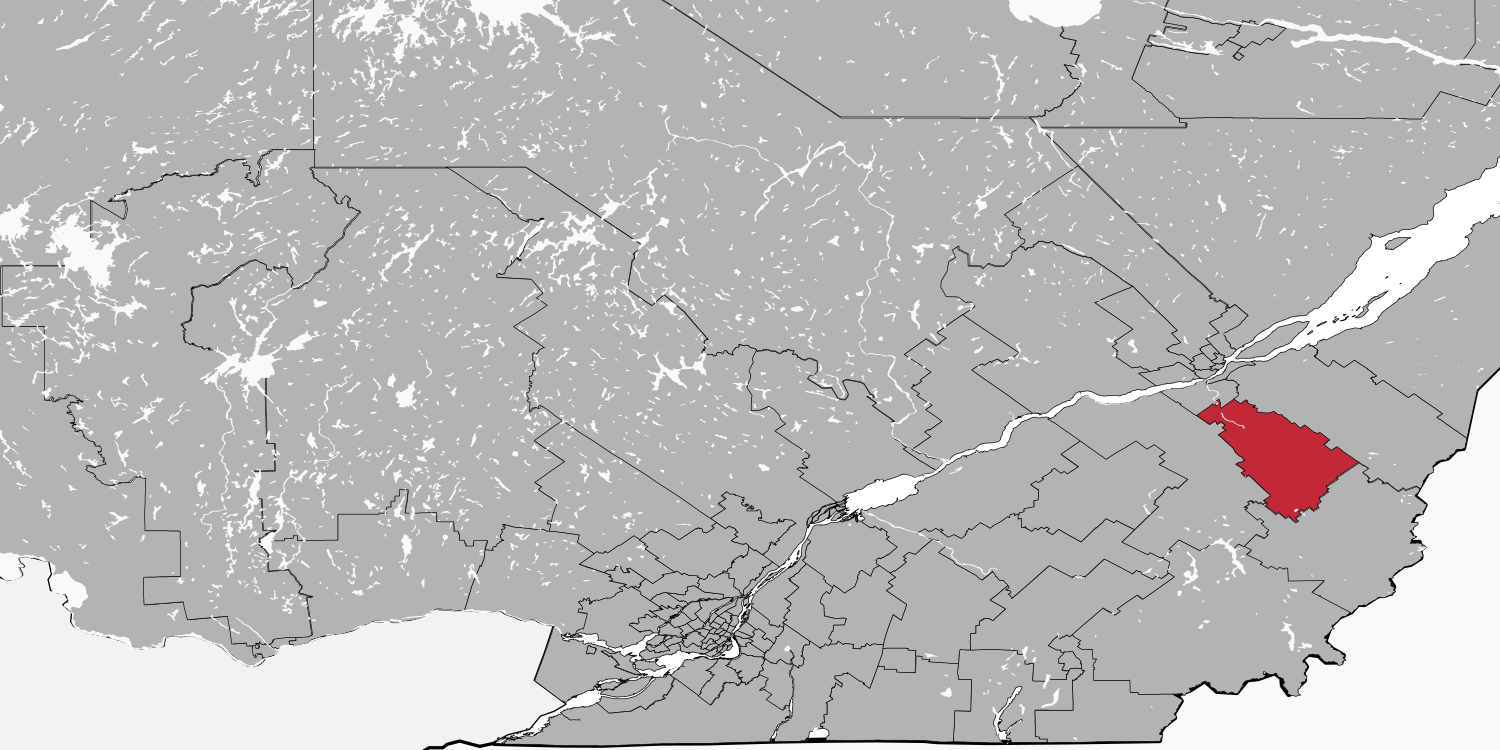
- Coordinates: 46.374°N 70.915°W

Provincial electoral district
- Legislature: National Assembly of Quebec
MNA
Patricia Drouin
Conservative
- District created: 1972
- First contested: 1973
- Last contested: 2026

Demographics
- Electors (2014): 42,229
- Area (km²): 1,756.4
- Census division(s): La Nouvelle-Beauce (all), Robert-Cliche (all)
- Census subdivision(s): Beauceville, Frampton, Saint-Alfred, Saints-Anges, Saint-Bernard, Saint-Elzéar, Saint-Frédéric, Sainte-Hénédine, Saint-Isidore, Saint-Joseph-de-Beauce, Saint-Joseph-des-Érables, Saint-Jules, Saint-Lambert-de-Lauzon, Sainte-Marguerite, Sainte-Marie, Saint-Odilon-de-Cranbourne, Saint-Séverin, Saint-Victor, Scott, Tring-Jonction, Vallée-Jonction

Beauce-Nord (French pronunciation: [bos nɔʁ]) is a provincial electoral district in the Chaudière-Appalaches region of Quebec, Canada, that elects members to the National Assembly of Quebec. It includes notably the municipalities of Sainte-Marie, Saint-Lambert-de-Lauzon, Beauceville, Saint-Joseph-de-Beauce, and Saint-Isidore.

It was created along with Beauce-Sud for the 1973 election from parts of Beauce. It also took parts from Dorchester and Lévis electoral districts.

In the change from the 2001 to the 2011 electoral map, its territory was unchanged.

== Members of the National Assembly ==
Legislature	Years	Member	Party
Riding created from Beauce, Dorchester and Lévis
30th	1973–1976	Denys Sylvain	Liberal
31st	1976–1981	Adrien Ouellette	Parti Québécois
32nd	1981–1985	Adrien Ouellette	Parti Québécois
33rd	1985–1989	Jean Audet	Liberal
34th	1989–1994	Jean Audet	Liberal
35th	1994–1998	Normand Poulin	Liberal
36th	1998–2003	Normand Poulin	Liberal
37th	2003–2007	Janvier Grondin	Action démocratique
38th	2007–2008	Janvier Grondin	Action démocratique
39th	2008–2012	Janvier Grondin	Action démocratique
39th	2012–2012	Janvier Grondin	Coalition Avenir Québec
40th	2012–2014	André Spénard	Coalition Avenir Québec
41st	2014–2018	André Spénard	Coalition Avenir Québec
42nd	2018–2022	Luc Provençal	Coalition Avenir Québec
43rd	2022–2026	Luc Provençal	Coalition Avenir Québec
44th	2026–Present	Patricia Drouin	Conservative

== Election results ==
2026 Quebec general election
** Preliminary results — Not yet official **
Party	Candidate	Votes	%	±%
Conservative	Patricia Drouin	22,164	61.86	+19.03
Liberal	Nancy Labbé	5,440	15.18	+12.35
Parti Québécois	Éric Gagnon Poulin	4,360	12.17	+6.23
Coalition Avenir Québec	Philippe Simard	2,483	6.93	–36.50
Québec solidaire	Julie Dionne	1,209	3.37	–1.16
Parti nul	Pierre Larochelle	174	0.49	N/A
Total valid votes		35,830	98.99	+0.09
Total rejected ballots		367	1.01	–0.09
Turnout		36,197	77.56	+0.53
Electors on the lists		46,667		
Conservative gain from Coalition Avenir Québec		Swing		+3.34
Source: Élections Québec

2022 Quebec general election
Party	Candidate	Votes	%	±%
Coalition Avenir Québec	Luc Provençal	14,590	43.43	-22.94
Conservative	Olivier Dumais	14,388	42.83	+38.15
Parti Québécois	Paméla Lavoie-Savard	1,994	5.94	+0.82
Québec solidaire	François Jacques-Côté	1,522	4.53	-2.53
Liberal	Clermont Rouleau	951	2.83	-12.83
Climat Québec	Gwendoline Mathieu-Poulin	146	0.43	–
Total valid votes		33,591	98.90	–
Total rejected ballots		372	1.10	–
Turnout		33,963	77.03	
Electors on the lists		44,093	–	–
Coalition Avenir Québec hold		Swing		

2018 Quebec general election
Party	Candidate	Votes	%	±%
Coalition Avenir Québec	Luc Provençal	20,039	66.37	+15.48
Liberal	Myriam Taschereau	4,729	15.66	-21.58
Québec solidaire	Fernand Dorval	2,131	7.06	+4.2
Parti Québécois	Daniel Perron	1,546	5.12	-1.75
Conservative	Isabelle Villeneuve	1,414	4.68	+3.29
Citoyens au pouvoir	Nicole Goulet	334	1.11	
Total valid votes		30,193	98.27	
Total rejected ballots		530	1.73	
Turnout		30,723	70.79	
Eligible voters		43,398		
Coalition Avenir Québec hold		Swing		+18.53
Source(s) "Rapport des résultats officiels du scrutin". Élections Québec.

2014 Quebec general election
Party	Candidate	Votes	%	±%
Coalition Avenir Québec	André Spénard	15,761	50.89	−6.45
Liberal	José Couture	11,535	37.24	+12.03
Parti Québécois	Olivier Pouliot-Audet	2,128	6.87	−3.27
Québec solidaire	Mathieu Dumont	887	2.86	+0.65
Conservative	Eric Couture	432	1.39	−0.18
Independent	Benoît Roy	125	0.4	−0.44
Option nationale	Lorenzo Tessier-Moreau	105	0.34	−0.56
Total valid votes		30,973	99.14	–
Total rejected ballots		268	0.86	–
Turnout		31,241	73.98	−2.6
Electors on the lists		42,229	–	–
Coalition Avenir Québec hold		Swing		

2012 Quebec general election
Party	Candidate	Votes	%	±%
Coalition Avenir Québec	André Spénard	18,126	57.34	+7.42
Liberal	Jack Roy	7,970	25.21	−12.77
Parti Québécois	Daniel Bizier	3,207	10.14	+1.07
Québec solidaire	Yv Bonnier Viger	697	2.21	+1.16
Conservative	Sébastien Drouin	494	1.56	
Green	Gwendoline Mathieu-Poulin	345	1.09	−0.43
Option nationale	Stéphane Trudel	286	0.90	
Independent	Benoît Roy	266	0.84	
Coalition pour la constituante	Danielle Favreau	222	0.70	
Total valid votes		31,613	98.87	–
Total rejected ballots		360	1.13	–
Turnout		31,973	76.58	
Electors on the lists		41,749	–	–
Coalition Avenir Québec hold		Swing		+10.09

^ Change is from redistributed results. CAQ change is from ADQ.

2008 Quebec general election
Party	Candidate	Votes	%	±%
Action démocratique	Janvier Grondin	12,633	49.92	
Liberal	Richard Lehoux	9,612	37.98	
Parti Québécois	Mireille Mercier-Roy	2,297	9.08	
Green	Francis Paré	384	1.52	–
Québec solidaire	Emilie Guimond-Bélanger	264	1.04	
Independent	Benoît Roy	117	0.46	

2007 Quebec general election
Party	Candidate	Votes	%	±%
Action démocratique	Janvier Grondin	19,127	62.62	
Liberal	Claude Drouin	8,056	26.38	
Parti Québécois	Denis Couture	2,392	7.83	
Green	Jérémie Vachon	525	1.72	–
Québec solidaire	Christian Dubois	361	1.18	
Independent	Benoît Roy	83	0.27	

2003 Quebec general election
Party	Candidate	Votes	%	±%
Action démocratique	Janvier Grondin	13,275	45.88	
Liberal	Normand Poulin	11,104	38.37	
Parti Québécois	Aline Carrier	4,160	14.38	
Bloc Pot	Julie Roy	223	0.77	
UFP	Richard Fecteau	175	0.60	–

1998 Quebec general election
Party	Candidate	Votes	%	±%
Liberal	Normand Poulin	12,137	46.39	+0.58
Parti Québécois	Gaston Gourde	10,126	38.70	-6.85
Action démocratique	Steven Blaney	3,772	14.42	–
Socialist Democracy	Serge Foisy	127	0.49	-5.62
Total valid votes		26,162	100.00	–
Liberal hold		Swing		+3.72

1995 Quebec referendum
Side	Votes	%
Non	15,794	55.37
Oui	12,733	44.63

1994 Quebec general election
Party	Candidate	Votes	%
Liberal	Normand Poulin	10,752	45.81
Parti Québécois	Benoît L'Heureux	10,691	45.55
New Democratic	Lise Rose	1,434	6.11
Natural Law	Alain Gagné	592	2.52
Total valid votes		23,469	97.91
Total rejected ballots		501	2.09
Turnout		23,970	78.16
Electors on the lists		30,668	–

1992 Charlottetown Accord referendum
Side	Votes	%
Non	13,583	56.91
Oui	10,284	43.09

1989 Quebec general election
Party	Candidate	Votes	%
Liberal	Jean Audet	13,660	61.13
Parti Québécois	Hugues Labbé	7,566	33.86
New Democratic	Jean-Marc Plante	672	3.01
Parti indépendantiste	Paul-Émile Grondin	449	2.01
Total valid votes		22,347	98.09
Total rejected ballots		434	1.91
Turnout		22,781	75.96
Electors on the lists		29,992	–

1985 Quebec general election
Party	Candidate	Votes	%
Liberal	Jean Audet	19,418	54.06
Parti Québécois	Adrien Ouellette	14,563	40.55
Independent	Michel Cliche	1,250	3.48
Parti indépendantiste	Pauline Bouffard	519	1.44
Christian Socialism	André La Haye	167	0.47
Total valid votes		35,917	98.69
Total rejected ballots		478	1.31
Turnout		36,395	79.73
Electors on the lists		45,646	–

1981 Quebec general election
Party	Candidate	Votes	%
Parti Québécois	Adrien Ouellette	18,858	53.39
Liberal	Paul-Emile Deschênes	14,030	34.72
Union Nationale	Yves Bertrand	2,433	6.89
Total valid votes		35,321	99.21
Total rejected ballots		281	0.79
Turnout		35,602	85.25
Electors on the lists		41,763	–

1980 Quebec referendum
Side	Votes	%
Non	19,527	55.70
Oui	15,532	44.30

1976 Quebec general election
Party	Candidate	Votes	%
Parti Québécois	Adrien Ouellette	10,974	37.12
Liberal	Denys Sylvain	10,562	35.72
Union Nationale	Gérard Gourde	6,412	21.69
Ralliement créditiste	Magella Brouard	830	2.81
Parti national populaire	Robert Trudel	786	2.66
Total valid votes		29,564	98.24
Total rejected ballots		531	1.76
Turnout		30,095	85.29
Electors on the lists		35,287	–

1973 Quebec general election
Party	Candidate	Votes	%
Liberal	Denys Sylvain	13,814	35.72
Parti Québécois	Adrien Ouellette	4,345	37.12
Parti créditiste	Florian Guay	4,293	2.81
Union Nationale	Claude Poulin	2,153	8.75
Total valid votes		24,605	98.66
Total rejected ballots		334	1.34
Turnout		24,939	81.86
Electors on the lists		30,465	–

== See also ==
- List of Quebec provincial electoral districts
- Canadian provincial electoral districts
