= Sainte-Hénédine =

- Parish municipality
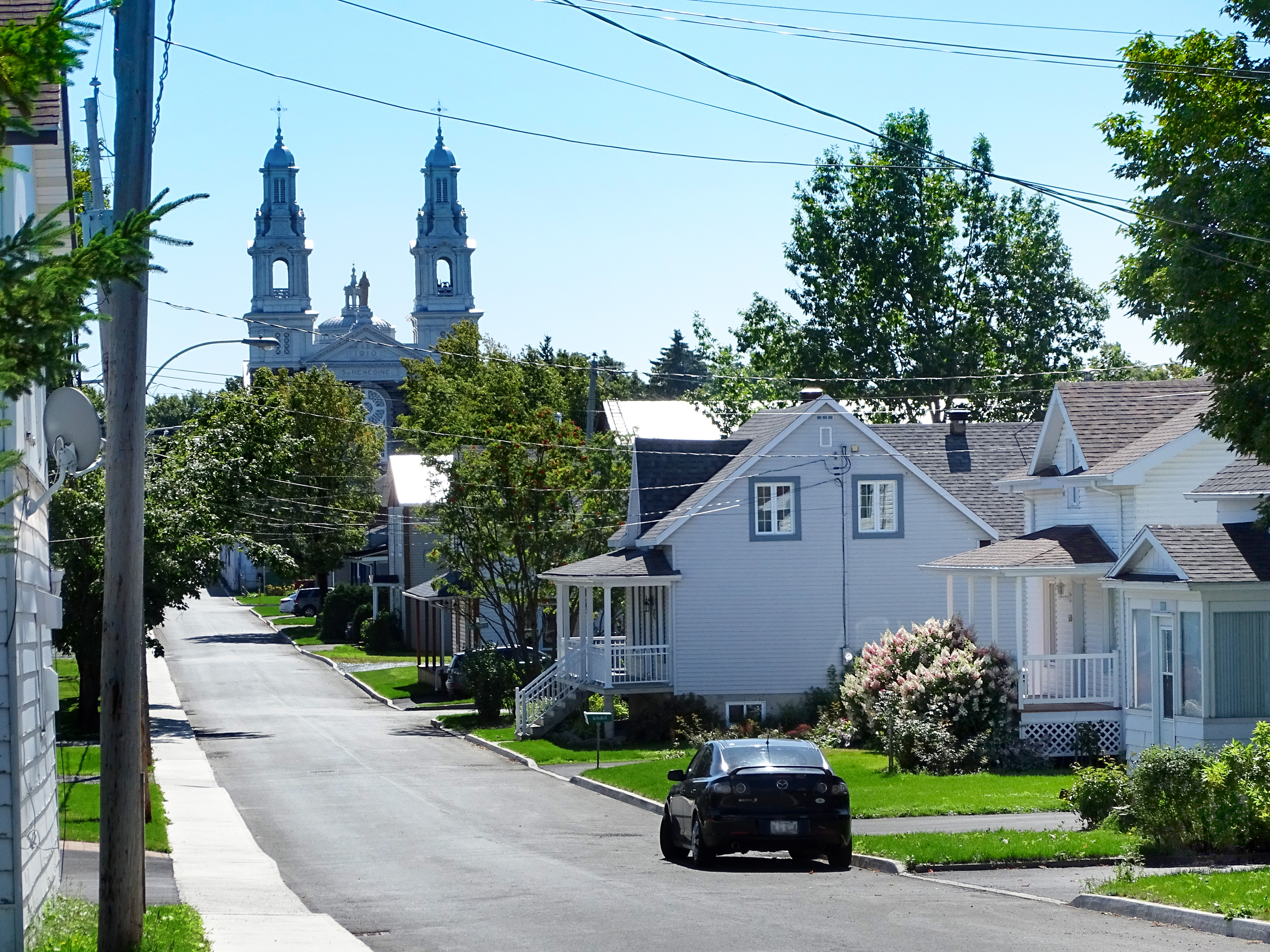

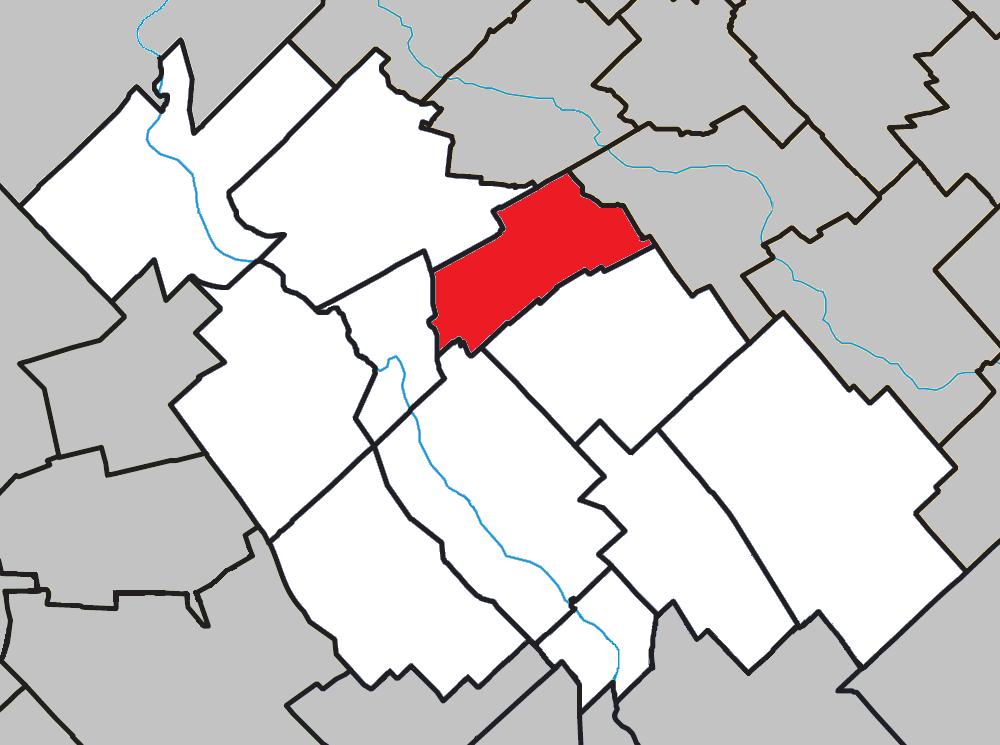
- Location within La Nouvelle-Beauce RCM

- Location in southern Quebec
- Coordinates: 46°33′N 70°59′W
- Country: Canada
- Province: Quebec
- Region: Chaudière-Appalaches
- RCM: La Nouvelle-Beauce
- Constituted: July 1, 1855
- Named for: Henedina

Government
  - Mayor: Yvon Asselin
  - Federal riding: Beauce
  - Prov. riding: Beauce-Nord

Area
  - Total: 51.20 km^{2} (19.77 sq mi)
  - Land: 51.53 km^{2} (19.90 sq mi)
- There is an apparent contradiction between two authoritative sources

Population (2021)
  - Total: 1,440
  - Density: 27.9/km^{2} (72/sq mi)
  - Pop 2016-2021: ▲13.3%
  - Dwellings: 564
- Time zone: UTC−5 (EST)
  - Summer (DST): UTC−4 (EDT)
- Postal code(s): G0S 2R0
- Area codes: 418 and 581
- Highways: R-275
- Website: ste-henedine.com

Sainte-Hénédine (French pronunciation: [sɛ̃t enedin]) is a parish municipality in La Nouvelle-Beauce Regional County Municipality in the Chaudière-Appalaches region of Quebec, Canada. Its population is 1,440 as of the Canada 2021 Census.

It is named after Catherine-Hénédine Dionne, widow of Pierre-Elzéar Taschereau, who owned the two seigneuries from which the territory of Sainte-Hénédine was detached.

== History ==
The parish was first settled in 1852 and became a parish town in 1855.

== Demographics ==
Historical census populations
Year	Pop.	±%
1861	1,103	—
1871	1,234	+11.9%
1881	1,169	−5.3%
1891	1,049	−10.3%
1901	1,075	+2.5%
1911	1,113	+3.5%
1921	1,129	+1.4%
1931	1,191	+5.5%
1941	1,162	−2.4%
1951	1,306	+12.4%
1956	1,357	+3.9%
1961	1,272	−6.3%
1966	1,293	+1.7%
1971	1,221	−5.6%
1976	1,202	−1.6%
1981	1,223	+1.7%
1986	1,226	+0.2%
1991	1,225	−0.1%
1996	1,175	−4.1%
2001	1,168	−0.6%
2006	1,073	−8.1%
2011	1,212	+13.0%
2016	1,271	+4.9%
2021	1,440	+13.3%
Source: Statistics Canada

In the 2021 Census of Population conducted by Statistics Canada, Sainte-Hénédine had a population of 1,440 living in 544 of its 564 total private dwellings, a change of 13.3% from its 2016 population of 1,271. With a land area of 51.53 km^{2} (19.90 sq mi), it had a population density of 27.9/km^{2} (72.4/sq mi) in 2021.

== Economy ==
Most of the residents in Sainte-Hénédine are farmers and mostly focused on dairy farming. A few homes line the main street of the town.

== Government ==
Sainte-Hénédine federal election results
Year	Liberal		Conservative		Bloc Québécois		New Democratic		Green	
2021	9%	63	55%	389	13%	92	3%	24	1%	10
2019	7%	51	51%	358	13%	87	4%	25	3%	21
2015	19%	99	60%	319	8%	45	10%	54	3%	14
2011	6%	30	55%	286	6%	30	32%	164	2%	8
2008	8%	40	65%	317	14%	69	9%	45	4%	20
2006	4%	21	74%	403	15%	82	3%	16	4%	21
2004	33%	162	23%	114	31%	154	11%	57	2%	10

Sainte-Hénédine provincial election results
Year	CAQ		Liberal		QC solidaire		Parti Québécois		Conservative	
2022	33%	225	4%	24	5%	37	5%	33	52%	351
2018	58%	372	17%	112	10%	64	6%	39	7%	46
2014	49%	347	36%	258	3%	23	9%	61	2%	16
2012	52%	337	27%	174	3%	21	10%	63	2%	15

Sainte-Hénédine forms part of the federal electoral district of Beauce and has been represented by Richard Lehoux of the Conservative Party since 2019. Provincially, Sainte-Hénédine is part of the Beauce-Nord electoral district and is represented by Luc Provençal of the Coalition Avenir Québec since 2018.

The parish municipality council consists of 6 councilors and a mayor. As of 2025 the current town council consists of:

- Yvon Asselin - Maire
- Claude Lapointe - Conseillère
- Pascal Laverdière - Conseiller
- Christian Roy - Conseiller
- Francis Tardif - Conseillèr
- Two more seats are vacant.

The mayor is also a member of the regional county council for la Nouvelle-Beauce.

Services provided by the parish includes:

- Recycling and Waste
- Fire Services - single fire station

== Infrastructure ==
=== Buildings ===
The smallest buildings in the parish are residential homes and are two stories tall. Large structures are usually barns and silos on dairy farms. The largest and tallest building in town is the Sainte-Hénédine Church (Église Sainte-Hénédine). This is second church built (first in the 1800s), it was blessed in 1912 and consecrated in 1992.

=== Roads ===
There are a few key roads within the parish:

- rue Principale (Route Sainte-Therese or Rue Desjardin)
- Highway 275 - rue Langevin

The parish is short distance from Quebec Autoroute 73, which travels north toe Quebec City.

=== Air ===
There are no airports in parish, the closest are Québec City Jean Lesage International Airport and Québec/Lac Saint-Augustin Water Airport.

== Education ==
The parish has a single elementary school, École la Découverte, with the Commission scolaire de la Beauce-Echemin. For secondary education students are sent to Polyvalente Benoît-Vachon in Sainte-Marie.

Bibliothèque de Quebec has branch in Sainte-Hénédine, Bibliothèque La Détente, providing public library access to parish residents.
