= Adrien Ouellette =

Canadian politician (1940–2023)

MNA for Beauce-Nord
- In office 1976–1985
- Preceded by: Denys Sylvain
- Succeeded by: Jean Audet

Personal details
- Born: February 9, 1940 Saint-Joseph-de-Beauce, Quebec, Canada
- Died: September 2, 2023 (aged 83)
- Party: Parti Québécois

Adrien Ouellette (February 9, 1940 – September 2, 2023) was a Canadian politician. He was a Parti Québécois member of the National Assembly of Quebec from 1976 to 1985, representing the riding of Beauce-Nord.

Prior to his election to the legislature, Ouellette served for eight years as mayor of Saint-Joseph-de-Beauce. He was appointed to the Order of Canada in 1973.

Ouellette died on September 2, 2023, at the age of 83.
