= Patricia Drouin =

21st century Canadian politician

Patricia Drouin MNA

Member of the National Assembly for Beauce-Nord
- Incumbent
- Assumed office October 5, 2026
- Preceded by: Luc Provençal

Personal details
- Party: Conservative

Patricia Drouin is a Canadian politician who is a candidate for the National Assembly of Quebec for Beauce-Nord in the 2026 Quebec general election as a member of the Conservative Party of Quebec.

Drouin is the former mayor of Vallée-Jonction.
