= Placide Poulin =

Canadian businessman (born 1938)

Placide Poulin CM CQ (born 1938 in Saint-Jules, Quebec, Canada) is a Canadian businessman. He was the founder of MAAX Inc., a company producing bathroom products, kitchen cabinets and outdoor spas. An influential man in the Beauce, Poulin is a member of the Parti libéral du Québec.

In 1969, he established Modern Fibreglass Inc. in Tring-Jonction, which specialized in the manufacture of snowmobile cabs, molded swimming pools and fibreglass components for the transportation industry.

The introduction of acrylic as a new manufacturing material led him to establish Acrylica Inc. in Ste-Marie-de-Beauce, which specialized in acrylic bathtubs and whirlpools. In 1987, all the companies were regrouped into one holding, MAAX Inc., with a research and development centre. Today, MAAX is a North American leader in bathroom products. On March 11, 2004, MAAX was sold to a group of investors comprising J.W. Childs Equity Funding III, Inc., Borealis Private Equity Limited Partnership, Borealis (QLP) Private Equity Limited Partnership and Ontario Municipal Employees Retirement System. In December 2015, Poulin was appointed as a Member of the Order of Canada. In 2016, he was made a Knight of the National Order of Quebec.
