= Normand Poulin =

Canadian politician

Member of the Quebec National Assembly for Beauce-Nord
- In office September 12, 1994 – April 14, 2003
- Preceded by: Jean Audet
- Succeeded by: Janvier Grondin

Personal details
- Born: September 18, 1954 (age 71) Beauceville, Quebec
- Party: Quebec Liberal Party
- Occupation: businessman, financial analyst

Normand Poulin (born September 18, 1954) was a Canadian politician, and a two-term Member of the National Assembly of Quebec.

== Early life ==
Normand Poulin was born in Beauceville in 1954. His father owned a local taxi company. Poulin was educated at the Cégep de Thetford and later Laval University, where he received his Bachelor of Science in finance.

Poulin began working in business and finance in the local region, first working for Banque Nationale du Canada in 1978. He later shifted his focus to economic development. He served in a variety of capacities in local development, becoming the Director-General of the City of Beauceville from 1990 to 1994.

== Member of the National Assembly ==
Poulin ran for the Liberal Party in the riding of Beauce-Nord in the hotly contested 1994 election. In an election that saw the sitting Liberal government defeated by the Parti Quebecois, Poulin won his seat by less than 200 votes.

Poulin was re-elected in the 1998 election, but defeated in the 2003 election, when Janvier Grondin, the Action démocratique du Québec candidate, defeated Poulin by over 2000 votes.

== Post-Political life ==
After his defeat, Poulin became a part of the Quebec civil service, serving as a member of the Quebec Municipal Commission from 2003 to 2006, and later as a member of the Commission for Protection of Agricultural Land in Quebec.
