= André Spénard =

Canadian politician (1950–2022)

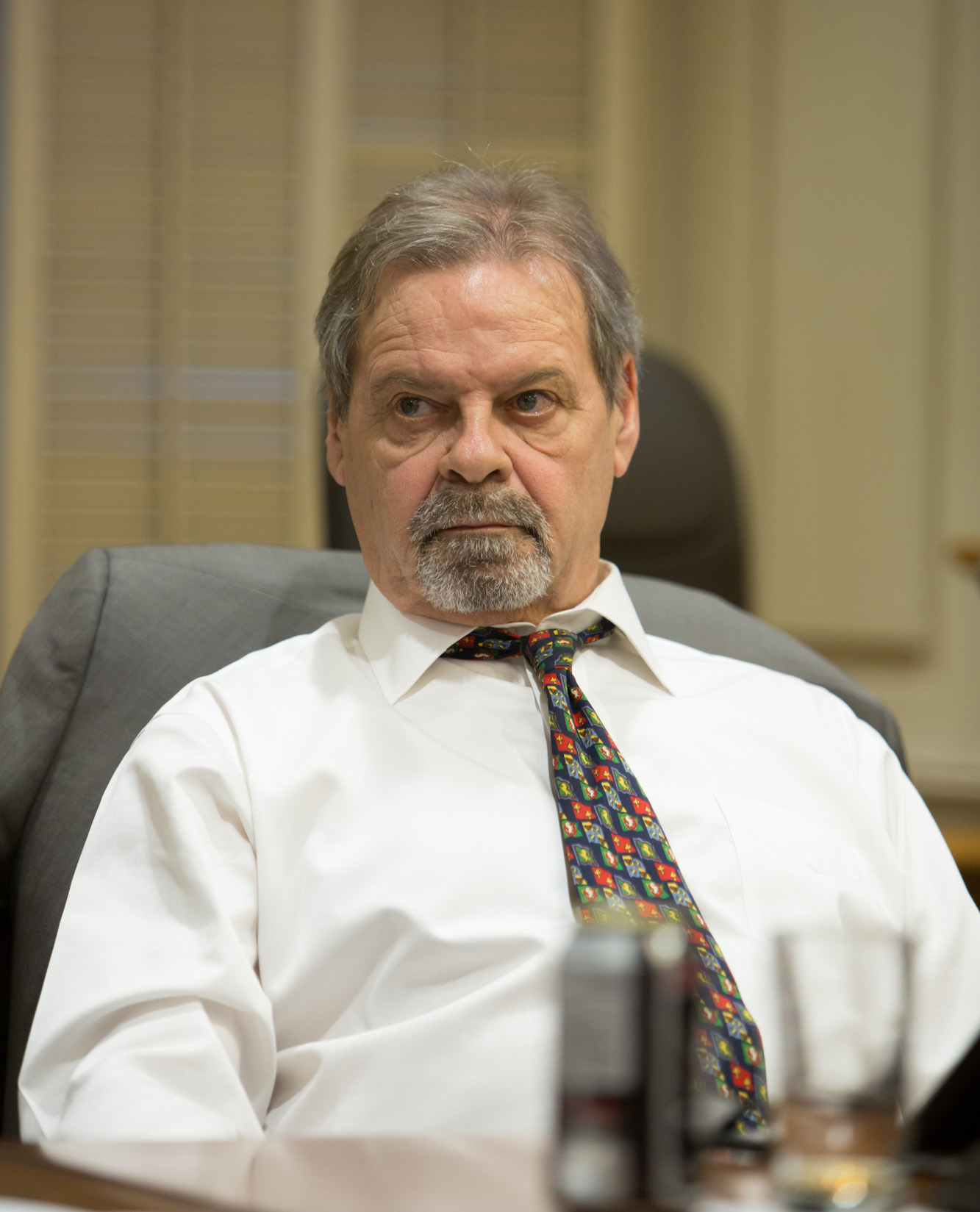

Member of the National Assembly of Quebec for Beauce-Nord
- In office 4 September 2012 – 29 August 2018
- Preceded by: Janvier Grondin
- Succeeded by: Luc Provençal

Personal details
- Born: 13 March 1950 Thetford Mines, Quebec, Canada
- Died: 14 October 2022 (aged 72)
- Party: Coalition Avenir Québec

André Spénard (13 March 1950 – 14 October 2022) was a Canadian politician who was a member of the National Assembly of Quebec for the riding of Beauce-Nord, first elected in the 2012 election. He was reelected in the 2014 election.

Spénard died on 14 October 2022, at the age of 72.
