= Marie-Anne-Louise Taschereau =

Canadian Catholic abbess, nun and teacher (1743–1825)

Marie-Anne-Louise Taschereau (October 18, 1743 – March 16, 1825) was a Canadian nun. As an Ursuline, she worked as a teacher, and served as a Mother Superior. She was the daughter of Thomas-Jacques Taschereau and Marie-Claire de Fleury de La Gorgendière, and sister of Gabriel-Elzéar Taschereau.

Her father had come to New France from France in 1726, married into a wealthy family and became the owner of the Sainte-Marie seigneury which was the family home.

She entered the Ursuline convent in May, 1764 as a postulant. In August she took the religious habit as Sister Marie-Anne-Louise de Saint-François-Xavier. She had a lifetime of service with the order including serving as its superior.
