= Luc Provençal =

Canadian politician

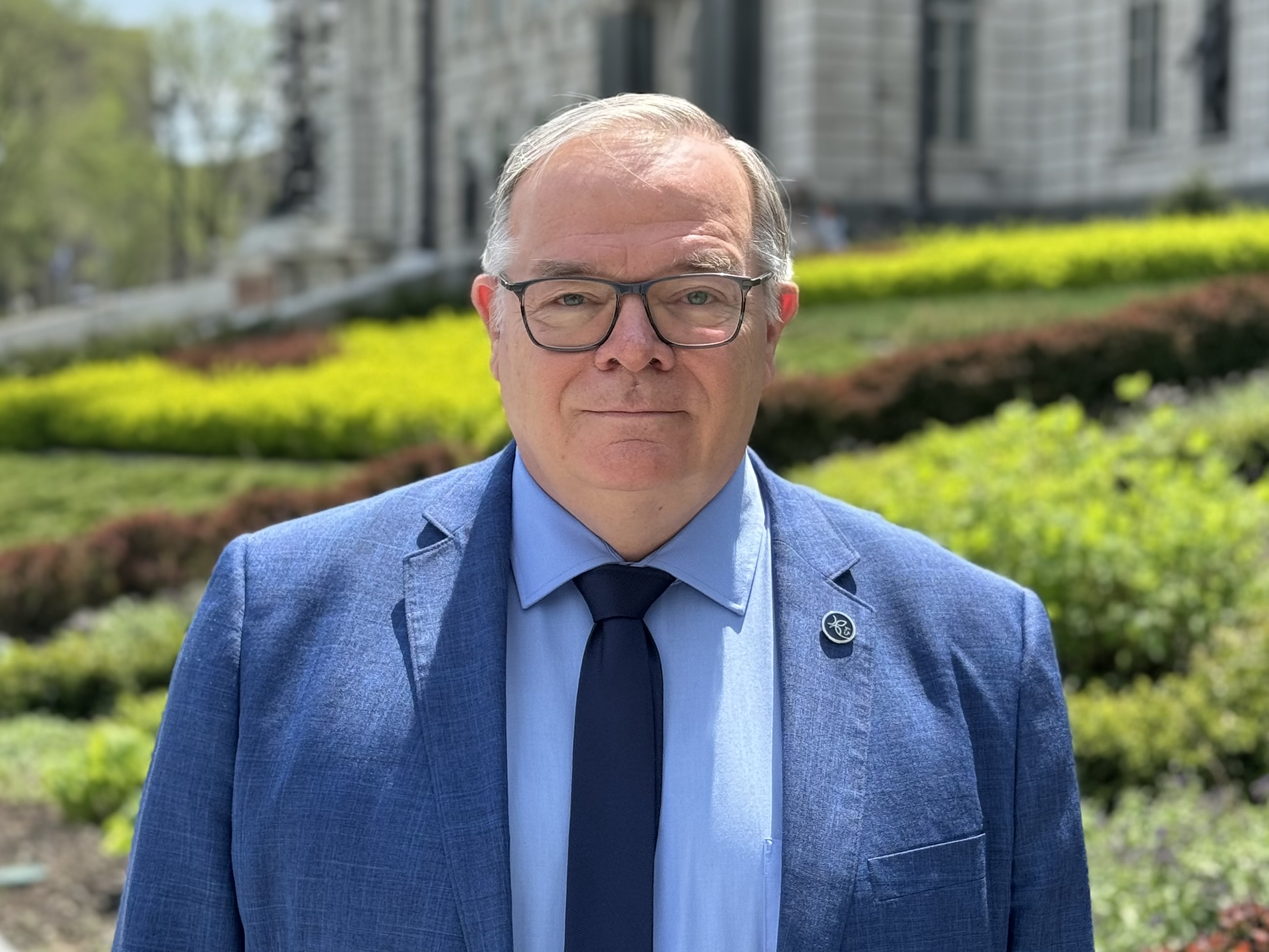

Member of the National Assembly of Quebec for Beauce-Nord
- In office October 1, 2018 – August 27, 2026
- Preceded by: André Spénard
- Succeeded by: Patricia Drouin

Mayor of Beauceville
- In office November 1, 2009 – October 2018
- Preceded by: Jean-Guy Bolduc
- Succeeded by: François Veilleux

Personal details
- Born: May 9, 1955 Beauceville, Quebec
- Party: Coalition Avenir Québec

Luc Provençal is a Canadian politician, who was elected to the National Assembly of Quebec in the 2018 provincial election. He represented the electoral district of Beauce-Nord as a member of the Coalition Avenir Québec. He did not seek re-election in the 2026 general election.

Prior to his election to the legislature, Provençal was the mayor of Beauceville from 2009 to 2018. He also served as a municipal councillor from 1989 to 1993 and from 2005 to 2009 and was the prefect of the Robert-Cliche Regional County Municipality from 2015 to 2018.

== Electoral record ==
=== Provincial ===
2022 Quebec general election: Beauce-Nord
Party	Candidate	Votes	%	±%
Coalition Avenir Québec	Luc Provençal	14,590	43.43	-22.94
Conservative	Olivier Dumais	14,388	42.83	+38.15
Parti Québécois	Paméla Lavoie-Savard	1,994	5.94	+0.82
Québec solidaire	François Jacques-Côté	1,522	4.53	-2.53
Liberal	Clermont Rouleau	951	2.83	-12.83
Climat Québec	Gwendoline Mathieu-Poulin	146	0.43	–
Total valid votes		33,591	98.90	–
Total rejected ballots		372	1.10	–
Turnout		33,963	77.03	
Electors on the lists		44,093	–	–
Coalition Avenir Québec hold		Swing		

2018 Quebec general election: Beauce-Nord
Party	Candidate	Votes	%	±%
Coalition Avenir Québec	Luc Provençal	20,039	66.37	+15.48
Liberal	Myriam Taschereau	4,729	15.66	-21.58
Québec solidaire	Fernand Dorval	2,131	7.06	+4.2
Parti Québécois	Daniel Perron	1,546	5.12	-1.75
Conservative	Isabelle Villeneuve	1,414	4.68	+3.29
Citoyens au pouvoir	Nicole Goulet	334	1.11	
Total valid votes		30,193	98.27	
Total rejected ballots		530	1.73	
Turnout		30,723	70.79	
Eligible voters		43,398		
Coalition Avenir Québec hold		Swing		+18.53
Source(s) "Rapport des résultats officiels du scrutin". Élections Québec.
