= Collège Jean-Eudes =

High school in Montreal, Quebec, Canada

Location
- 3535 Rosemont Blvd; Montreal, Québec, H1X 1K7; Canada; 45°33′22.3″N 73°34′47.5″W

Information
- Former names: Collège des Eudistes (French), Collège des Eudistes de Rosemont (French)
- Type: Private school
- Motto: "Instaurare Omnia In Christo" (Latin)
- Established: 1953
- Principal: Dominic Blanchette
- Staff: 122 (2018)
- Enrollment: 1,800
- Language: French
- Colours: Red and black
- Nickname: Eagles (Les Aigles)
- Website: jeaneudes.qc.ca

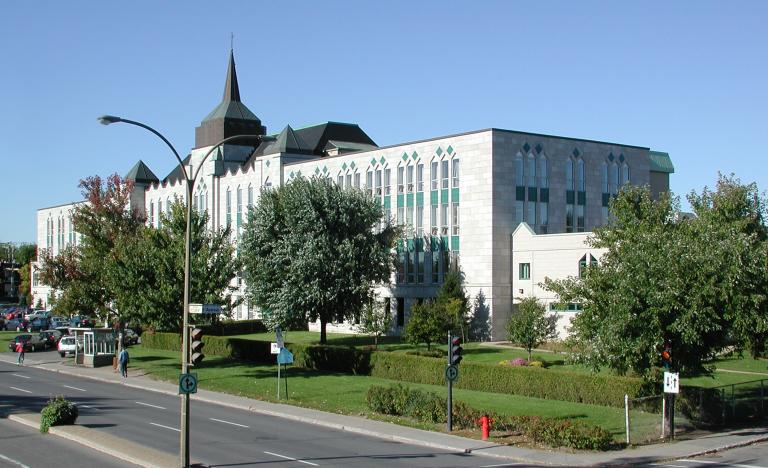
College Jean-Eudes seen from Rosemont Boulevard

Collège Jean-Eudes is a private French-language high school in Montreal, Quebec, Canada, established in 1953 by the Eudists brotherhood. It is located on Rosemont Boulevard at 15th Avenue in the Montreal borough of Rosemont–La Petite-Patrie. Collège Jean-Eudes is considered to be one of the best schools in Quebec as ranked by the Fraser Institute. College Jean-Eudes was one of the first schools to instigate the use of the iPad in class during the autumn of 2012. Students must wear uniforms.

== Admissions ==
Prospective students must pass an entrance exam to be accepted in the school. A maximum of 360 students are admitted each year to form and maintain 10 groups of 36 in each grade. Current tuition is $5,035 CAD yearly. They are able to maintain low tuition due to a large average class size of 35 in the first year and 37 in subsequent years.

== School facilities ==
The school has two dining halls where one has a cafeteria. The cafeteria is open from 7AM to 3PM and includes diverse full-meal choices for $8,25 CAD, a salad bar and a panini station. A lunch counter is also available near the other dining hall, open from 7AM to 6PM. The school's facilities include a double gymnasium, a rock climbing wall, as well as a workout room, with gym equipment. The school also shares an agreement with the adjacent Centre Étienne Desmarteau allowing the use of two other gyms and a skating rink. It is also home to a variety of sports teams, called les Aigles (the Eagles), such as volleyball, hockey, futsal, basketball, football, flag football, badminton, track and field and many more. The school also features intensive dramatic arts, music and dance programs. Facilities to allow these activities include a 410-seat auditorium, a drama studio, a dance studio, two large music rooms, a computer assisted music room and several small soundproofed music studios. The school's jazz bands and wind ensembles regularly compete at local and national events.

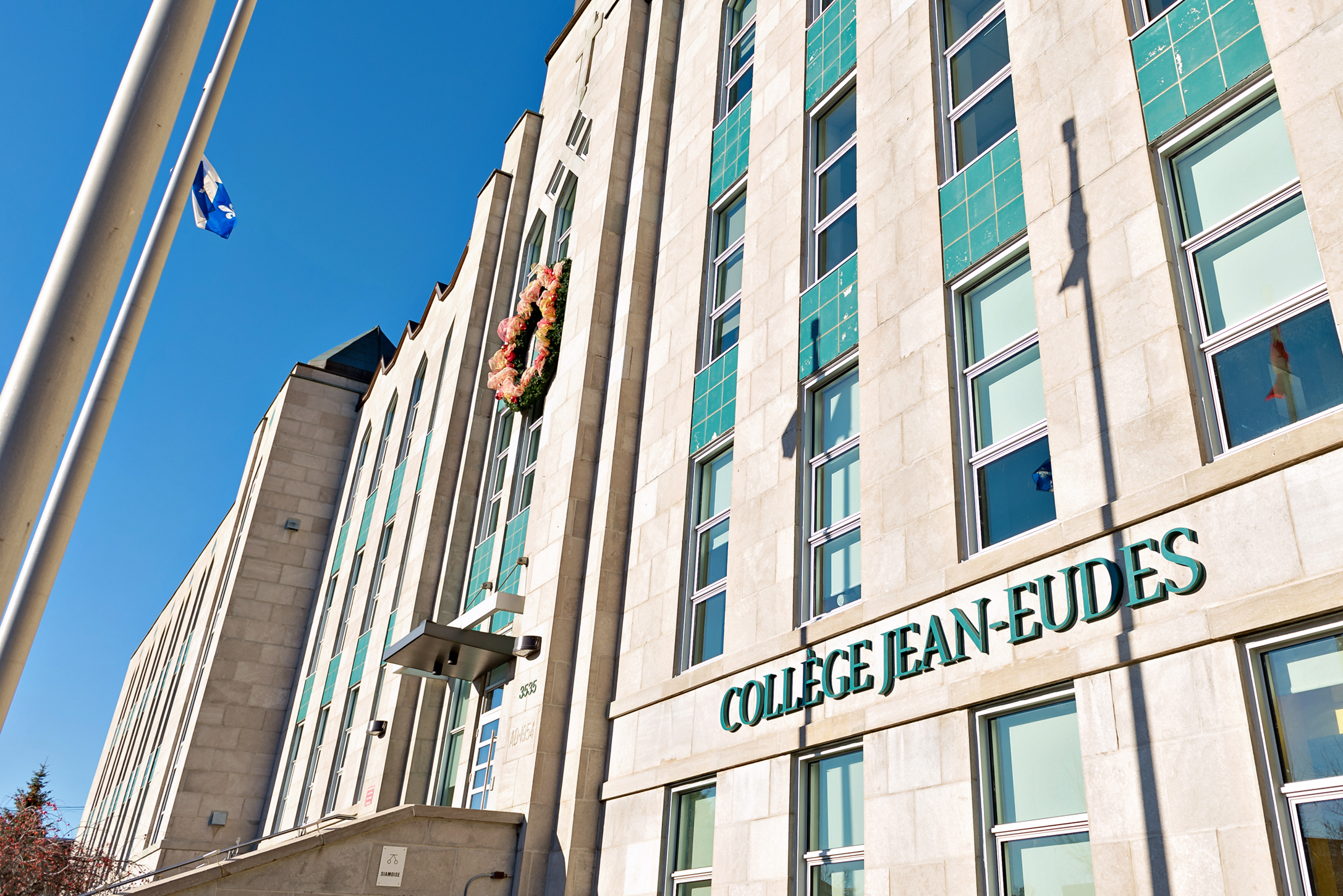
Front view of the school

== School programs ==
Collège Jean-Eudes offers its students many after school programs:

- Culinary arts
- Art
- Fictional writing (Belles-lettres)
- Cinema
- Dance
- Graphic Design
- Music
- Photography
- Set design
- Theater
- Biology
- Robotics
- Football
- Hockey
- Basketball
- Futsal
- Volleyball
- Plein-air: hiking, cross-country skiing, running
- Globe-Trotter: discovery of Spanish and its cultures
- Humani-Terre: Third world initiatives
- Entreprenariat: Entrepreneur initiatives

== Board of directors ==
The board of directors is composed of ten members.

== Foundation ==
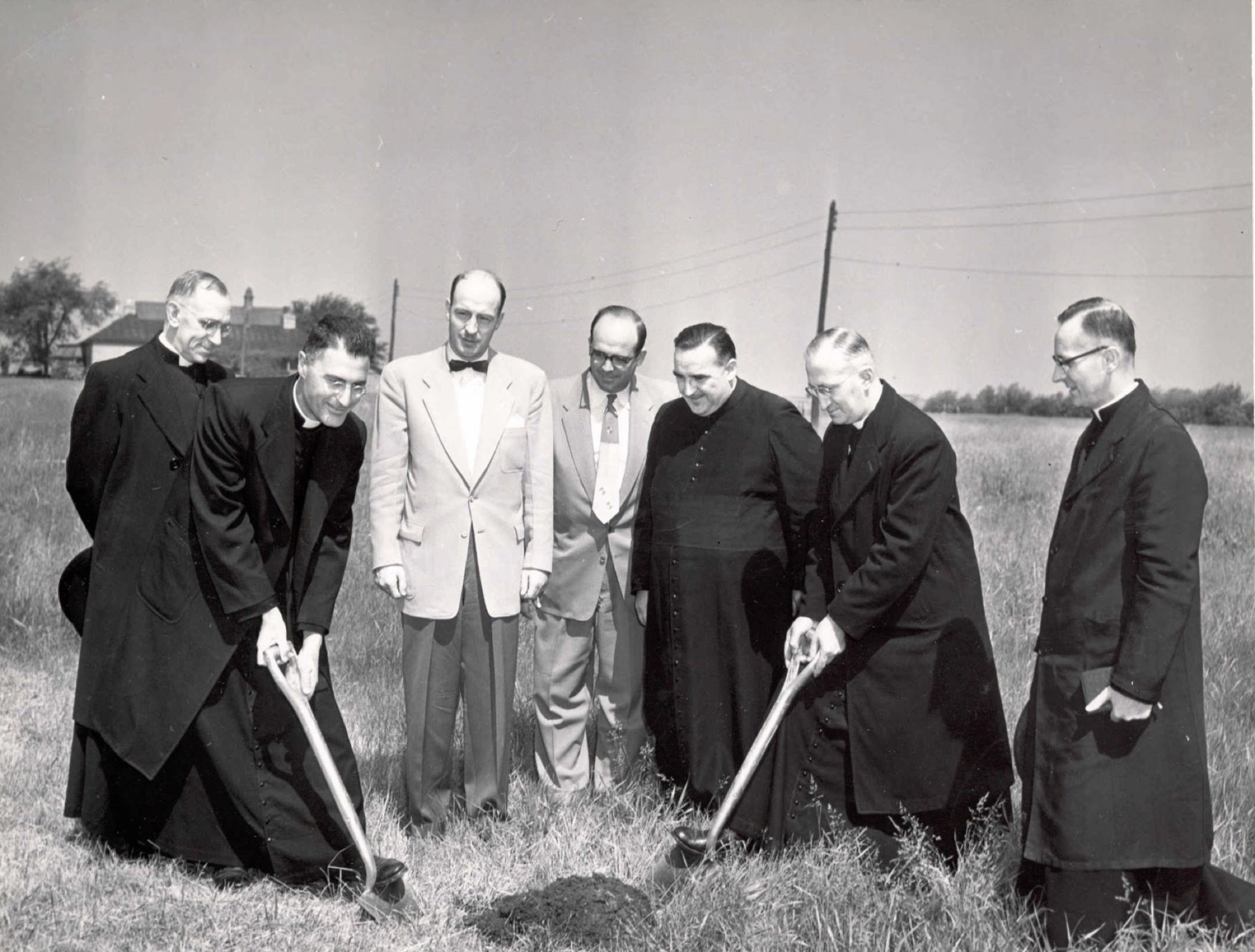
Groundbreaking ceremony in 1953

Collège Jean-Eudes also has a foundation which created an endowment fund in 1979. Its mission was to offer financial help to students who were from lower income families. Since its inception, it has helped over 800 students for a total of over 2 million dollars. The foundation also financially contributes in the creation of pedagogical and athletic projects through its development funds created in 2007.

== Notable people ==
Normand D'Amour, Julie Snyder, Bertrand Laverdure, Éric Bédard, Mathieu Denis, Jenny Salgado, Étienne Boulay, Alexandre Bilodeau, Anik Vermette, Frédéric Pierre, Isabelle Richer, Marc Denis, Michel Charette, Robert Lacroix, Sylvain Archambault, Vincent Damphousse, Anne-Marie Withenshaw, Yves Lamontagne.
