= Olivier Trudel =

Canadian politician

Olivier Trudel (October 25, 1781 – August 19, 1859) was a farmer and political figure in Lower Canada. He represented Champlain in the Legislative Assembly of Lower Canada from 1830 to 1838.

He was born in Batiscan, Quebec, the son of François Trudel and Suzanne Lefebvre. He lived at Sainte-Geneviève-de-Batiscan. Trudel supported the Parti patriote and voted in support of the Ninety-Two Resolutions. He was married twice: to Marguerite Toutant in 1808 and to Marie-Josephte Hamelin in 1853. Trudel died at Saint-Prosper at the age of 77.

He was the grandfather of François-Xavier-Anselme Trudel who later served in the Quebec Legislative Assembly and the Canadian Senate.
