= Saint-Jules, Quebec =

Saint-Jules
- Parish municipality
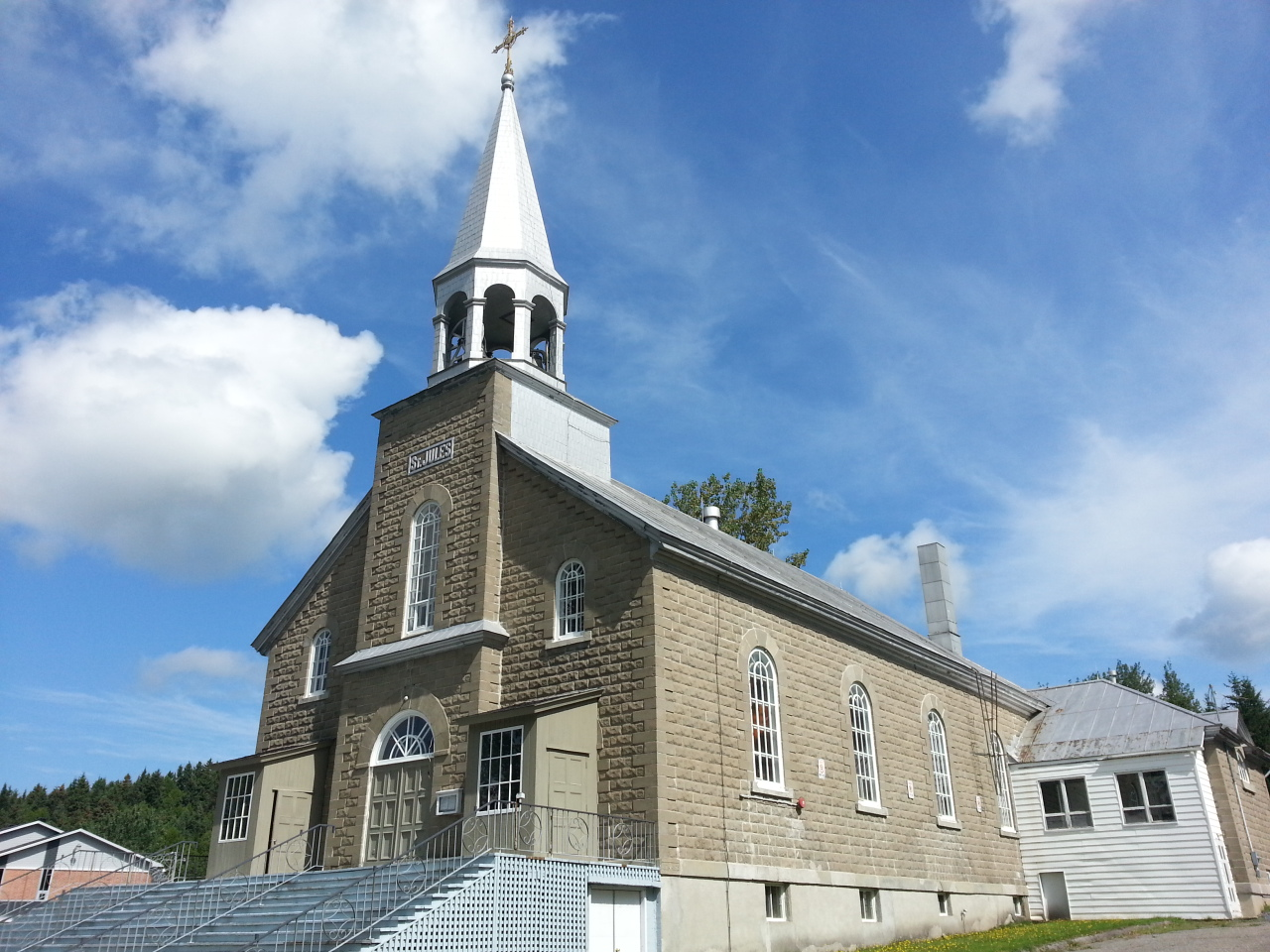
- St-Jules' Church

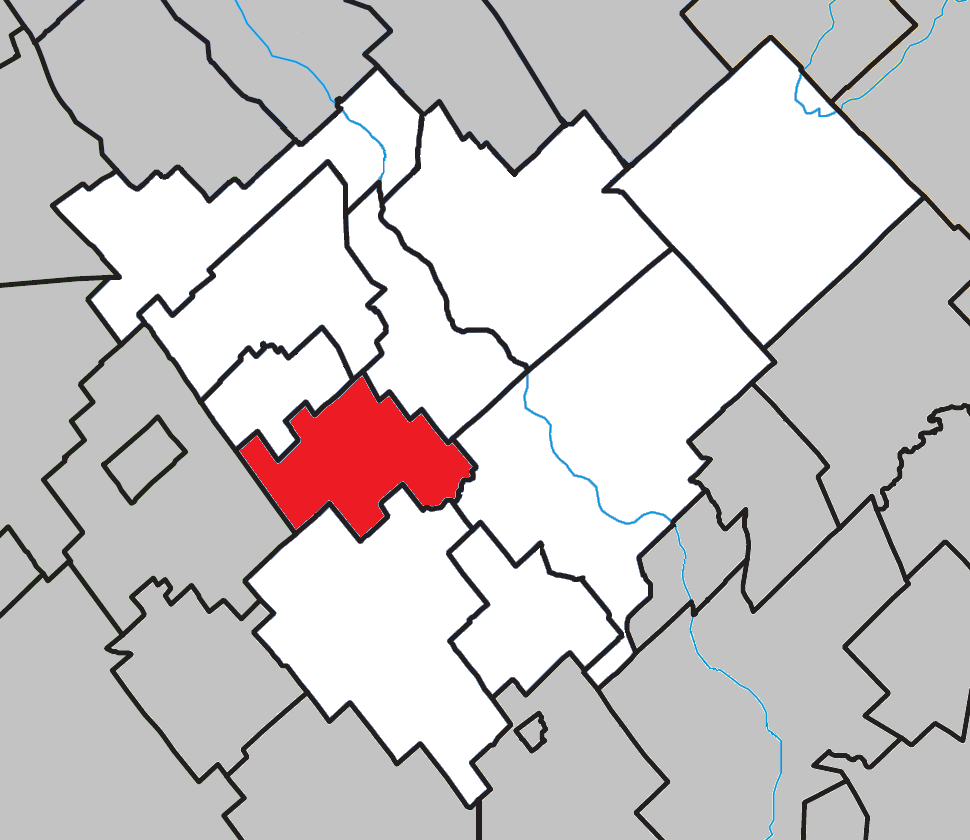
- Location within Beauce-Centre RCM.

- Location in southern Quebec.
- Coordinates: 46°13′N 70°57′W
- Country: Canada
- Province: Quebec
- Region: Chaudière-Appalaches
- RCM: Beauce-Centre
- Constituted: May 28, 1919
- Named for: Pope Julius I

Government
  - Mayor: Sylvain Cloutier
  - Federal riding: Beauce
  - Prov. riding: Beauce-Nord

Area
  - Total: 55.70 km^{2} (21.51 sq mi)
  - Land: 55.73 km^{2} (21.52 sq mi)
- There is an apparent contradiction between two authoritative sources

Population (2021)
  - Total: 547
  - Density: 9.8/km^{2} (25/sq mi)
  - Pop 2016-2021: ▲1.5%
  - Dwellings: 215
- Time zone: UTC−5 (EST)
  - Summer (DST): UTC−4 (EDT)
- Postal code(s): G0N 1R0
- Area codes: 418 and 581
- Highways: No major routes
- Website: www.st-jules.qc.ca

Saint-Jules (French pronunciation: [sɛ̃ ʒyl]) is a parish municipality in the Beauce-Centre Regional County Municipality in the Chaudière-Appalaches region of Quebec, Canada. Its population was 547 as of the Canada 2021 Census. It is named after Pope Julius I.

== Demographics ==
In the 2021 Census of Population conducted by Statistics Canada, Saint-Jules had a population of 547 living in 204 of its 215 total private dwellings, a change of 1.5% from its 2016 population of 539. With a land area of 55.73 km^{2} (21.52 sq mi), it had a population density of 9.8/km^{2} (25.4/sq mi) in 2021.

=== Population ===
Population trend:

| Census | Population | Change (%) |
|---|---|---|
| 2021 | 547 | ▲1.5% |
| 2016 | 539 | ▼5.9% |
| 2011 | 573 | ▲7.3% |
| 2006 | 534 | ▼0.2% |
| 2001 | 535 | ▼0.4% |
| 1996 | 537 | ▼3.8% |
| 1991 | 558 | ▼2.4% |
| 1986 | 572 | ▼6.7% |
| 1981 | 613 | ▼5.8% |
| 1976 | 651 | ▼15.2% |
| 1971 | 768 | ▼5.4% |
| 1966 | 812 | ▲0.1% |
| 1961 | 811 | ▼6.8% |
| 1956 | 870 | ▲9.2% |
| 1951 | 797 | ▲1.5% |
| 1941 | 785 | ▲26.8% |
| 1931 | 619 | ▲4.7% |
| 1921 | 591 | N/A% |

=== Language ===
Home language (2021)

| Language | Population | Pct (%) |
|---|---|---|
| French only | 550 | 100% |
| English only | 0 | 0% |

== Arts and culture ==
Cultural crafts are represented locally by the Cercle de Fermières de Saint-Jules, a community organization devoted to improving the living conditions of women and families, and the transmission of cultural heritage and craftsmanship.

== Notable people ==
- Janvier Grondin, Coalition Avenir Québec politician
- Placide Poulin, businessman
