= Quebec Law on Public Education =

The Law on Public Education (French: Loi sur l'instruction publique) is a provincial law of Quebec which legislates the Québécois public education system. It is under the responsibility of the Minister of Education of Quebec.

The legislation originated in 1801. The current law was adopted in 1988, resulting from the modernization of several old school laws adopted in 1829, 1867, and 1964.
