= Champlain (Lower Canada) =

Coordinates: 46.779°N 73.026°W

Lower Canada electoral district

Defunct pre-Confederation electoral district
- Legislature: Legislative Assembly of Lower Canada
- District created: 1830
- District abolished: 1838
- First contested: 1830
- Last contested: 1834

The district of Champlain was established in 1829, under the regime of the Constitutional Act of 1791. It was located in the current Mauricie area and was located northeast of the district of Saint-Maurice on the north shore of the St. Lawrence River.

Champlain was represented simultaneously by two Members at the Legislative Assembly of Lower Canada.

== Members for Champlain (1830-1838) ==
Name	Party	Election
Olivier Trudel	Parti Canadien	1830
Olivier Trudel	Parti Patriote	1834
Pierre-Antoine Dorion	Parti Canadien	1830
Pierre-Antoine Dorion	Parti Patriote	1834

== See also ==
- Champlain, Quebec
- Champlain (electoral district in Canada East)
- Champlain (Quebec provincial electoral district)
- History of Canada
- History of Quebec
- Politics of Canada
- Politics of Quebec
- Sainte-Anne-de-la-Pérade
- Saint-Maurice—Champlain Federal Electoral District
