= CIREQ =

Centre Interuniversitaire de Recherche en Économie Quantitative (CIREQ; French for "Center for Interuniversity Research in Quantitative Economics") is a research center devoted to economics and quantitative analysis. CIREQ is financed by the Fonds québécois de la recherche sur la société et la culture (FQRSC) and by the Université de Montréal, McGill University, and Concordia University. The Center organizes conferences, workshops, and seminars. It also hosts, via visiting scholar programs, international researchers every year, for periods from one to several weeks.
