= Jean-Thomas Taschereau (politician) =

Canadian politician

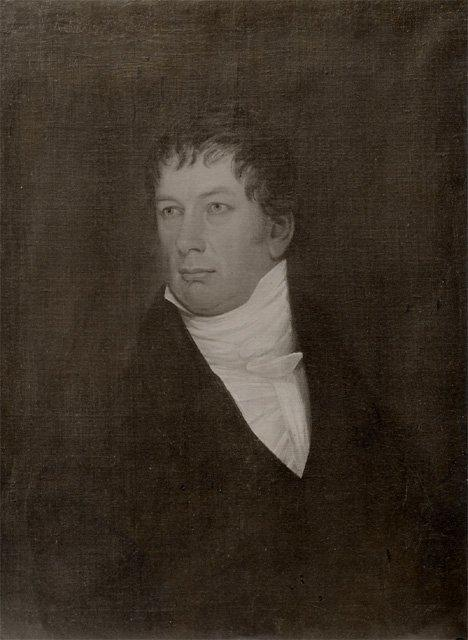

Jean-Thomas Taschereau (French pronunciation: [ʒɑ̃ tɔma taʃʁo]; November 26, 1778 – June 14, 1832) was a son of Gabriel-Elzéar Taschereau and Marie-Louise-Élizabeth Bazin. He was a seigneur, lawyer, judge and politician.

He studied at the Petit Séminaire of Quebec and began his legal training as an assistant to his father in 1799 and studied law with Jonathan Sewell. He became a lawyer in 1801. He successfully ran for elected office a number of times, to the Legislative Assembly of Lower Canada. He spent a short time in prison in 1810 on the order of the governor, James Henry Craig. More political success followed and in 1821 he was appointed as a judge in Sainte-Marie. He held increasingly important judicial positions including the Court of Kings Bench for the district of Quebec until his death.

He married Marie Panet May 19, 1806, and had at least two sons, Jean-Thomas Taschereau and Elzéar-Alexandre Taschereau, the first Canadian cardinal. He was the grandfather of Louis-Alexandre Taschereau and Edward Routh, and the great-grandfather of Robert Taschereau. He and his brother Thomas-Pierre-Joseph Taschereau were involved with the development of the paternal seigniory of Sainte-Marie-de-la-Nouvelle-Beauce (now Sainte-Marie).
