= Thomas-Pierre-Joseph Taschereau =

Thomas-Pierre-Joseph Taschereau (French pronunciation: [tɔma pjɛʁ ʒozɛf taʃʁo]) was born in Quebec April 19, 1775, a son of Gabriel-Elzéar Taschereau, the patriarch of this important family, and his first wife, Marie-Louise-Élizabeth Bazin. He studied at the Petit Séminaire of Quebec from 1784 to 1792.

He embarked on a military career and became a lieutenant in 1797. Demobilized in 1802, he went into business and set up a distillery with his brother Jean-Thomas Taschereau, in the Sainte-Marie seigneury. He married Françoise Boucher of Bruère de Montarville in 1805. He continued the business at this property until the War of 1812 when he served with the rank of lieutenant-colonel in the militia.

Thomas-Pierre-Joseph became a member of the Legislative Council in 1818. In 1821, he took an appointment as a judge in the district of Sainte-Marie and in 1823 a more important position in the district of Quebec. He died on October 8, 1826, and was buried at Sainte-Marie.

He had two sons: Joseph-André and Pierre-Elzéar Taschereau. The latter's son, Henri-Elzéar, was appointed to the Supreme Court of Canada in 1878, and he became Chief Justice of Canada in 1902.
