= Henri-Elzéar Taschereau =

Chief Justice of Canada from 1902 to 1906

The Right Honourable Sir Henri-Elzéar Taschereau PC
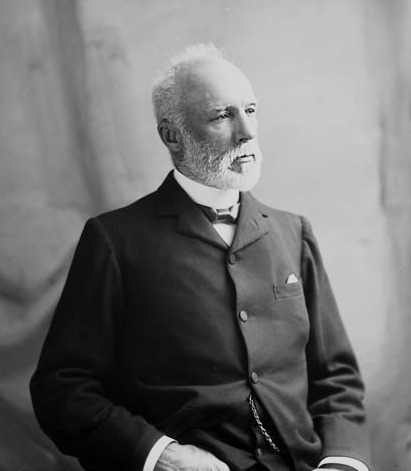

4th Chief Justice of Canada
- In office November 21, 1902 – May 2, 1906
- Nominated by: Wilfrid Laurier
- Preceded by: Samuel Henry Strong
- Succeeded by: Charles Fitzpatrick

Puisne Justice of the Supreme Court of Canada
- In office October 7, 1878 – November 21, 1902
- Nominated by: John A. Macdonald
- Preceded by: Jean-Thomas Taschereau
- Succeeded by: John Douglas Armour

Personal details
- Born: October 7, 1836 Sainte-Marie-de-la-Nouvelle-Beauce, Lower Canada
- Died: April 14, 1911 (aged 74) Ottawa, Ontario
- Spouse(s): Marie-Antoinette Harwood; Marie-Louise Panet

Sir Henri-Elzéar Taschereau, (October 7, 1836 – April 14, 1911) was a Canadian jurist and the fourth Chief Justice of Canada.

== Career ==
Taschereau was born in his family's seigneurial manor house at Sainte-Marie-de-la-Beauce, Lower Canada to Pierre-Elzéar Taschereau and Catherine Hénédine Dionne. Tashereau attended the Université Laval and was called to the Bar of Quebec in 1857. That same year he married Marie-Antoinette de Lotbiniere Harwood (d. 1896), daughter of Robert Unwin Harwood, and they were the parents of seven children. He married his second wife, Marie-Louise Panet, in 1897 and fathered three more children.

He practiced law in Quebec City and entered politics in 1861 when he was elected to the Legislative Assembly of what was then the Province of Canada where he opposed Canadian Confederation. He was appointed a judge of the Quebec Superior Court in 1871.

== Justice of the Supreme Court of Canada ==
On October 7, 1878, Taschereau was appointed by Alexander Mackenzie to the Supreme Court of Canada. The appointment was made after the liberals lost the 1878 election, but two days before John A. Macdonald was sworn in again as Prime Minister. Taschereau replaced his cousin Jean-Thomas Taschereau, who was one of the original six justices of the Supreme Court.

During his time on the Court, Taschereau taught law part-time at the University of Ottawa. He was made a knight bachelor on 14 August 1902, after the honour had been announced in the 1902 Coronation Honours list published on 26 June 1902.

=== Chief Justice of Canada ===
On November 21, 1902, Justice Taschereau was elevated to the role of Chief Justice, following the tradition of the most senior puisne justice being appointed to the role. Taschereau became the first Quebec justice to hold the position of chief justice. Snell and Vaughn note that Taschereau was viewed by the legal community as the most qualified justice on the Court at the time, and the appointment would help legitimize the Supreme Court in the eyes of Quebec. Taschereau was appointed following the November 17, 1902, resignation of Chief Justice Samuel Henry Strong. Strong resigned from the Court after Justice Minister Charles Fitzpatrick arranged for Strong to receive both his judicial pension and a salary as chair of a commission to revise and consolidate the statutes of Canada. Following tradition, Taschereau was knighted in 1903.

Chief Justice Henri-Elzéar Taschereau resigned from the Supreme Court of Canada on May 2, 1906, at the age of 69. Taschereau claimed that his resignation was part of the condition for his appointment to the Imperial Privy Council earlier in 1904, which entitled him to sit on the Judicial Committee of the Privy Council. Taschereau heard 20 appeals as a member of the Privy Council, and wrote one reported opinion.

Taschereau remained as chief justice until the Laurier government found a replacement. By his retirement from the Supreme Court, Taschereau had served as a judge for 44 years with over 27 years on the Supreme Court. In his final years on the Court his energy and health had been worsening.

== Judicial Committee of the Privy Council ==
Taschereau was appointed to the Judicial Committee of the Privy Council in 1904, and attended summer sittings five times in 1904, 1906, 1907, 1908, and 1910.

== Family ==
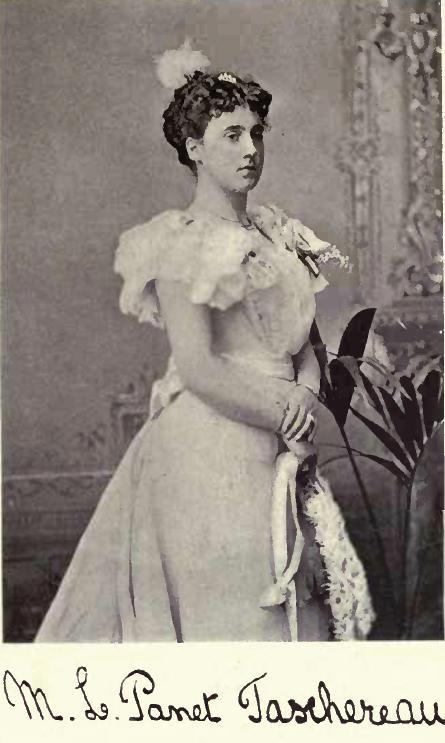
Madame Marie Louise Panet Taschereau by William James Topley

Taschereau was the great, great grandson of Thomas-Jacques Taschereau, the patriarch of the family in Canada. He was first-cousin once-removed to the brothers Elzéar Alexandre Cardinal Taschereau and Supreme Court Justice Jean-Thomas Taschereau. Jean-Thomas's son Louis-Alexandre would serve as Premier of Quebec. Jean-Thomas's grandson Robert Taschereau would also serve as Chief Justice of Canada.

Henri-Elzéar Taschereau married at Vaudreuil, Quebec May 27, 1857, to Marie Antoinette Harwood, daughter of the Hon. R. U. Harwood, Seigneur of Vaudreuil, and his wife, Marie Louise Josephte Chartier de Lotbiniere. The couple had seven children. She died at Ottawa, June 2, 1896.

Henri-Elzéar Taschereau married at Ottawa, March 22, 1897 his second wife Marie Louise Panet, daughter of Charles Panet, Clerk of Private Bills, House of Commons, Ottawa, and his wife, Euphemie Chateauvert. Marie Louise was born in Ottawa, February 29, 1868, and received her education at the Convent of the Sacred Heart (Grey Nuns) in Ottawa. The couple lived at 363 Theodore Street, Ottawa. The couple had two sons. Charles Elzear de Montarville Taschereau was born in Ottawa on October 5, 1898. Henri Edouard Panet Taschereau was born at Ottawa, August 9, 1902.
