= Electoral districts of Lower Canada =

Division of Lower Canada into electoral districts

The electoral districts of Lower Canada were territorial subdivisions of the Province of Lower Canada in British North America, serving as the basis of the representation of the population in the Legislative Assembly of Lower Canada, the lower house of the Provincial Parliament of Lower Canada. This house was the first legislative assembly in the history of Quebec. The districts were used between 1792 and 1838, when the constitution of the province was suspended as a consequence of the Lower Canada Rebellion.

The Constitutional Act 1791 provided for the creation of a House of Assembly or Legislative Assembly, made up of at least fifty elected members. Lieutenant governor Alured Clarke divided the territory of the province into twenty-seven districts each returning one or two members to the Legislative Assembly. Twenty-three districts returned two members and four returned a single members. The rural districts were called "counties" (French: comtés), while the urban ones were called "cities" (cités) or "bouroughs" (bourgs). Sixteen out of twenty-seven bore typically English names, while the others bore French or Indigenous names.

In 1828, governor James Kempt, who was on good terms with the elected House of Assembly, favoured the redrawing of the electoral map. Five new districts were created, in total electing eight new members, in the newly settled Eastern Townships. These elected their first representatives to Parliament in 1829. The following year, the old districts were subdivided into smaller ones, which for the most part were given French names. A last district was created in 1832 and a second seat was added to existing ones, so that when the constitution was suspended in 1838, there were forty-six electoral districts in Lower Canada. They returned ninety members in total. Twenty-nine of these bore French names, eleven had Indigenous names, and six had English names.

== 1792 to 1829 ==
District	Location	Seats	Reform of 1829
Bedford	Haut-Richelieu, East shore.	1	Renamed to Rouville.
Buckinghamshire	South shore of the St. Lawrence River between Sorel and Lévis.	2	Districts of Drummond (one seat), Missisquoi (2), Shefford (1), Sherbrooke (2) and Stanstead (2) are detached from Buckinghamshire, and are ready to return MMPs as of 1829. What remains is divided into Lotbinière (two seats), Nicolet (2) and Yamaska (2).
Cornwallis	South shore of the St. Lawrence River between La Pocatière and Cap-Chat.	2	Divided into Kamouraska and Rimouski (two seats each).
Devon	South shore of the St. Lawrence River from Montmagny to Saint-Roch-des-Aulnaies.	2	Renamed to L'Islet.
Dorchester	Lévis, Saint-Henri and Beauce.	2	The district of Beauce is detached from that of Dorchester.
Effingham	The Île Jésus, Blainville and Terrebonne.	2	Renamed to Terrebonne.
Gaspé	All of the Gaspésie region from Cap-Chat.	1	The district of Bonaventure is detached from that of Gaspé.
Hampshire	North shore of the St. Lawrence River from Sainte-Anne-de-la-Pérade to Saint-Augustin-de-Desmaures.	2	Renanmed to Portneuf.
Hertford	The South shore of the St. Lawrence River from Beaumont to Montmagny.	2	Renamed to Bellechasse.
Huntingdon	South shore of the St. Lawrence River from the American border to Laprairie, including the West shore of Upper Richelieu River.	2	Divided into Beauharnois, L'Acadie and Laprairie.
Kent	Boucherville, Longueuil, Chambly, Blairfindie (L'Acadie)	2	Renamed to Chambly.
Leinster	Lachenaie, Mascouche and the Western region of Lanaudière.	2	Divided into Lachenaie and l'Assomption (two seats each).
County of Montreal	Island of Montreal except the town of Montreal.	2	No change.
Montreal East		2	No change.
Montreal West		2	No change.
Northumberland	North shore of the St. Lawrence River from Beauport to the provincial border.	2	Divided into Montmorency (one seat) and Saguenay (2).
Orléans	The île d'Orléans	1 (second seat added in 1830)	No change.
County of Quebec	Region surrounding Quebec City, on the North shore of the St. Lawrence River.	2	No change.
Lower Town of Quebec		2	No change.
Upper Town of Quebec		2	No change.
Richelieu	Lower Richelieu River, East shore: Île Saint-Ignace, île du Pas, part of Saint-Ours, Yamaska, Saint-Denis, Saint-Charles, Saint-Hyacinthe	2	The district of Saint-Hyacinthe (two seats) is detached from that of Richelieu.
Saint-Maurice	North shore of the St. Lawrence River from Maskinongé to Batiscan, except Trois-Rivières.	2	The district of Champlain (two seats) is detached from Saint-Maurice.
Surrey	The South shore of the St. Lawrence River from Boucherville to the mouth of the Richelieu River, and the West shore of the same: part of Saint-Ours, Contrecœur, Verchères, Varennes, Saint-Antoine, Belœil.	2	Renamed to Verchères.
Trois-Rivières	Town of Trois-Rivières.	2	No change.
Warwick	The North shore of the St. Lawrence River from Lavaltrie to Berthierville.	2	Renamed to Berthier.
William-Henry	Include Sorel, called William-Henry from 1787 to 1845.	1	No change.
York	Vaudreuil, Soulanges, the Île-Perrot, Deux-Montagnes and Rivière-du-Chêne (Saint-Eustache).	2	Divided in Deux-Montagnes (two seats), Ottawa (1) and Vaudreuil (2).

== 1829 to 1838 ==
District	Seats	In the new Province of Canada (1841)
Beauce	2	Disappeared (merged with Dorchester)
Beauharnois	2	Preserved
Bellechasse	2	Preserved
Berthier	2	Preserved
Bonaventure	2	Preserved
Chambly	2	Preserved
Champlain	2	Preserved
Deux-Montagnes	2	Preserved
Dorchester	2	Preserved, merged with Beauce
Drummond	1	Preserved
Gaspé	2	Preserved
Kamouraska	2	Preserved
L'Acadie	2	Disappeared (merged with Laprairie in Huntingdon)
Lachenaie	1	Disappeared (merged with L'Assomption in Leinster)
Laprairie	2	Disappeared (merged with L'Acadie in Huntingdon)
L'Assomption	2	Disappeared (merged with Lachenaie in Leinster)
L'Islet	2	Preserved
Lotbinière	2	Preserved
Mégantic	1	Preserved
Missisquoi	2	Preserved
Montmorency	1	Preserved, merged with Orléans
County of Montreal	2	Preserved
Montreal East	2	Disappeared (merged into Montreal with Montreal West)
Montreal West	2	Disappeared (merged into Montreal with Montreal East)
Nicolet	2	Preserved
Orléans	2	Disappeared (merged with Montmorency)
Ottawa	2	Preserved
Portneuf	2	Preserved
County of Quebec	2	Preserved
Lower Town of Quebec	2	Disappeared (merged into Quebec with Upper Town of Quebec)
Upper Town of Quebec	2	Preserved (merged into Quebec with Lower Town of Quebec)
Richelieu	2	Preserved (merged with William-Henry)
Rimouski	2	Preserved
Rouville	2	Preserved
Saguenay	2	Preserved
Saint-Hyacinthe	2	Preserved
Saint-Maurice	2	Preserved
Shefford	2	Preserved
Sherbrooke	2	Preserved
Stanstead	2	Preserved
Terrebonne	2	Preserved
Trois-Rivières	2	Preserved
Vaudreuil	2	Preserved
Verchères	2	Preserved
William-Henry	1	Disappeared (merged with Richelieu)
Yamaska	2	Preserved
