= Joseph-André Taschereau =

Canadian politician

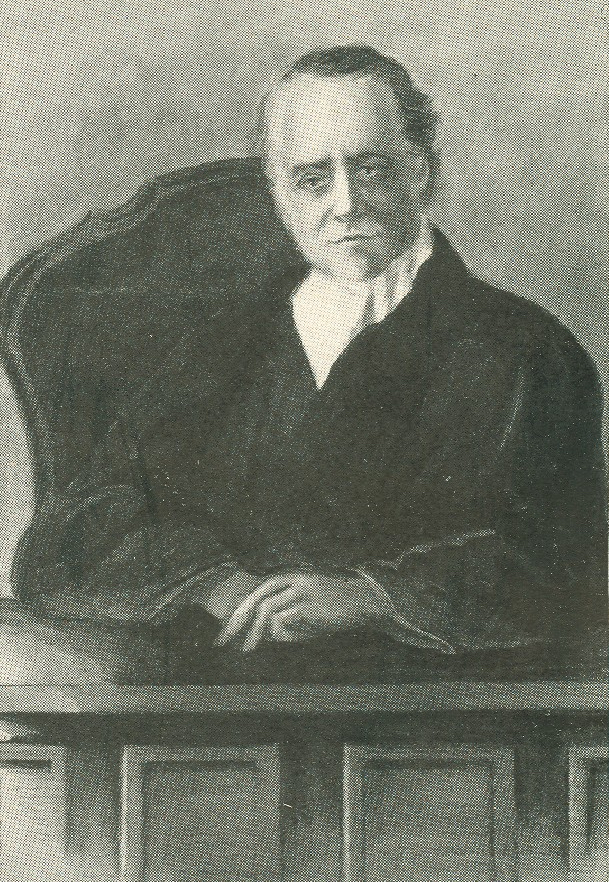

Joseph-André Taschereau (French pronunciation: [ʒozɛf ɑ̃dʁe taʃʁo]; November 30, 1806–March 30, 1867), was a lawyer, politician, and lastly, a judge. He was born at Sainte-Marie, Lower Canada. The son of Thomas-Pierre-Joseph Taschereau was a quiet child who early in life discovered a passion for the law. He was educated at home and then articled and was admitted to the bar of Lower Canada in 1828 along with his brother, Pierre-Elzéar Taschereau.

Joseph-André had less than a year of joint practice in Quebec City with his brother, Pierre-Elzéar, who in 1826 had inherited his father's seigneury and had returned to the manor at Sainte-Marie. He continued his practice from 1830 to 1835 and then entered politics in Beauce.

He was elected a member of the Legislative Assembly of Lower Canada from 1835 to 1838. In 1845, he won a by-election to become a member of the Legislative Assembly of the Province of Canada, filling the seat left vacant by the death of Pierre-Elzéar; he resigned when he was made a circuit judge in 1847. In 1857 he was named judge of the Quebec Superior Court for the District of Kamouraska, where he had gone to live in 1852. He died in Kamouraska, Quebec at the age of 60 years.

Joseph-Andre never married; instead, he devoted himself to politics and the law.
