= Pierre-Elzéar Taschereau =

Canadian politician

Member of the Legislative Assembly of Lower Canada from Beauce
- In office 1830–1835

Member of the Legislative Assembly of the Province of Canada from Dorchester
- In office 1844–1845

Personal details
- Born: September 28, 1805 Quebec City, Canada
- Died: July 25, 1845 (aged 39) Sainte-Marie, Canada
- Occupation: Lawyer

Pierre-Elzéar Taschereau (October 28, 1805 – July 25, 1845) was a lawyer and political figure in Quebec. He represented Beauce in the Legislative Assembly of Lower Canada from 1830 to 1835 and Dorchester from 1844 to 1845 in the Legislative Assembly of the Province of Canada.

He was born in Quebec City, the son of seigneur Thomas-Pierre-Joseph Taschereau and Françoise Boucher de La Bruère de Montarville. Taschereau was admitted to the Lower Canada bar in 1828 and set up practice in Quebec City in partnership with his brother Joseph-André. Shortly afterwards, he inherited the seigneury of Sainte-Marie. Taschereau voted for the Ninety-Two Resolutions. In 1834, he married Catherine-Hénédine Dionne, the daughter of seigneur Amable Dionne. Taschereau resigned his seat in the assembly in 1835. He refused to run for the Dorchester seat following the union of Upper and Lower Canada in 1841 but was elected in the 1844 election. He died in office at his residence in Sainte-Marie-de-la-Nouvelle-Beauce at the age of 39 after developing an aneurysm.

His son Henri-Elzéar later served as Chief Justice of Canada.
