= Sainte-Marie, Quebec =

Sainte-Marie
- City
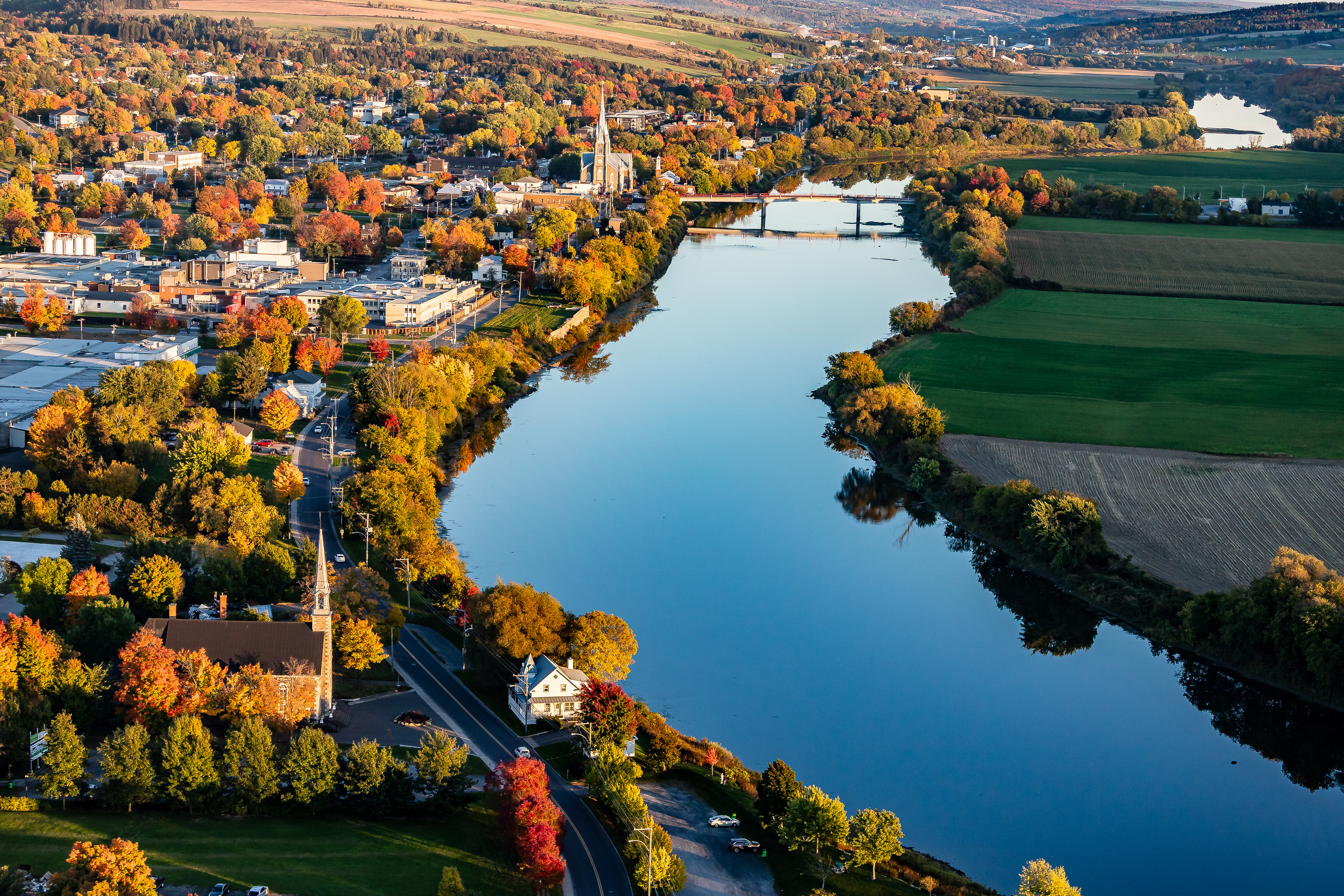
- Aerial view of Sainte-Marie

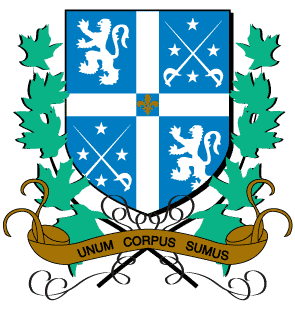
- Seal
- Motto: "Unum Corpus Sumus" (Latin for, "We Are One Body")
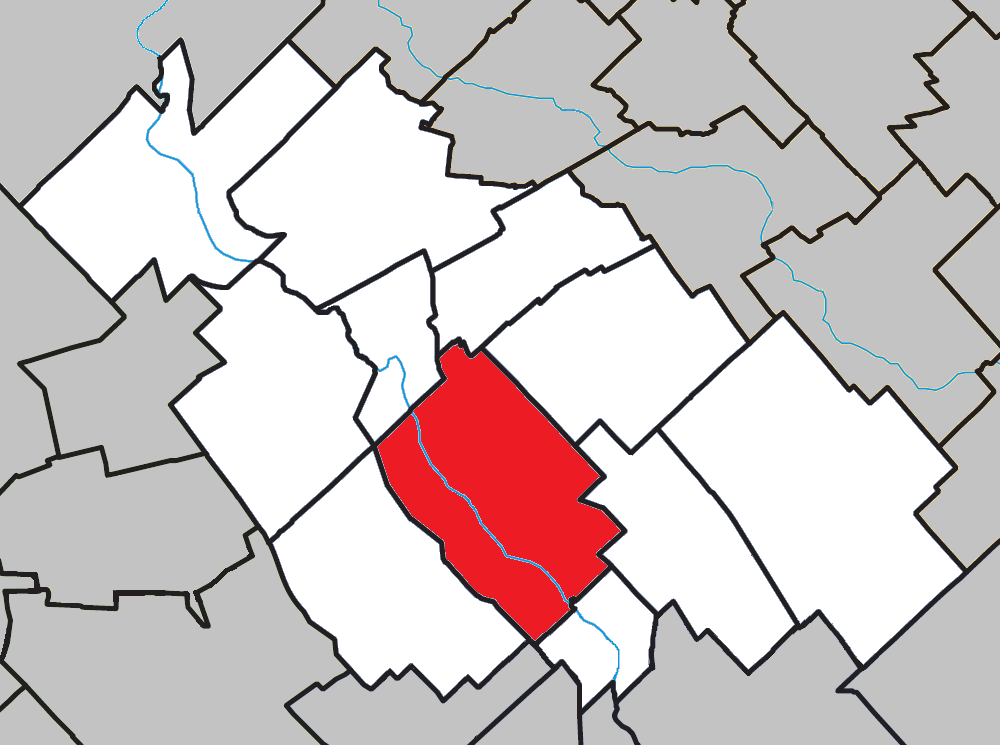
- Location within La Nouvelle-Beauce RCM

- Location in southern Quebec
- Coordinates: 46°27′N 71°02′W
- Country: Canada
- Province: Quebec
- Region: Chaudière-Appalaches
- RCM: La Nouvelle-Beauce
- Constituted: April 15, 1978

Government
  - Mayor: Luce Lacroix
  - Federal riding: Beauce
  - Prov. riding: Beauce-Nord

Area
  - City: 108.90 km^{2} (42.05 sq mi)
  - Land: 107.55 km^{2} (41.53 sq mi)
  - Urban: 10.65 km^{2} (4.11 sq mi)

Population (2021)
  - City: 13,134
  - Density: 122.1/km^{2} (316/sq mi)
  - Urban: 10,716
  - Urban density: 1,006.1/km^{2} (2,606/sq mi)
  - Pop 2016-2021: ▼3.2%
  - Dwellings: 5,630
- Demonym(s): Mariverains, Mariveraines
- Time zone: UTC−5 (EST)
  - Summer (DST): UTC−4 (EDT)
- Postal code(s): G6E
- Area codes: 418 and 581
- Highways A-73: R-173; R-216
- Website: www.sainte-marie.ca

Sainte-Marie (French pronunciation: [sɛ̃t maʁi]) is a city in the province of Quebec, Canada. It is the seat of La Nouvelle-Beauce Regional County Municipality, in Chaudière-Appalaches, Quebec, Canada. It had a population of 13,134 as of the Canada 2021 Census, when 95.7% was French-speaking. It is located 59 kilometres (37 mi) south-east of Quebec City, on the Chaudière River.

== History ==
The seigneurie of Sainte-Marie-de-la-Nouvelle-Beauce was granted to Thomas-Jacques Taschereau in 1736. He chose the name in honour of his wife, Marie-Claire de Fleury de La Gorgendière. The religious parish was founded in 1737 and the municipality in 1845.

The territory of Sainte-Marie was divided on several occasions, as population increased, in order to found neighbouring communities: Saint-Bernard, Saint-Isidore, Saint-Maxime-de-Scott (now Scott), Sainte-Marguerite, Sainte-Hénédine, Saint-Sylvestre, Saint-Elzéar, Saint-Séverin, Saints-Anges, and Vallée-Jonction.

In 1913, the territory was split again, following the detachment of the village (urban part of the territory) from the parish municipality (rural part). In 1958, the village was constituted as a city and in 1959, Sainte-Marie-de-la-Nouvelle-Beauce was renamed as Sainte-Marie. In 1978, the city and the parish municipality governments amalgamated.

== Geography ==
The Chaudière River, which flows through Sainte-Marie, is the area’s most striking feature. 70% of the area is used for agriculture. It is crossed by the Autoroute 73 and the Route 173. For cyclists, it is also crossed by the Route Verte 6 cycle route.

=== Hydrography ===
Several watercourses run through the city: the Chaudière River flows through the city, to the west, from south-east to north-west.

From its source, the Rivière du Moulin flows south-west to join the Rivière Chaudière to the north-west of the city; from its source, the Rivière du Domaine flows west to join the Rivière Chassé, which crosses the city from north-east to south-west, The Belair River flows through the south-east of the city.

The Vallée River, which flows eastwards in the north-west of the city, and the Savoie River in the west.

== Demographics ==
Historical census population counts
Year	Pop.	±%
1921	1,311	—
1931	1,598	+21.9%
1941	1,736	+8.6%
1951	2,431	+40.0%
1956	3,094	+27.3%
1961	3,662	+18.4%
1966	4,192	+14.5%
1971	4,307	+2.7%
1976	4,462	+3.6%
1981	8,936	+100.3%
1986	9,536	+6.7%
1991	10,542	+10.5%
1996	10,966	+4.0%
2001	11,320	+3.2%
2006	11,584	+2.3%
2011	12,889	+11.3%
2016	13,565	+5.2%
2021	13,134	−3.2%
Source: Statistics Canada

In the 2021 Census of Population conducted by Statistics Canada, Sainte-Marie had a population of 13,134 living in 5,500 of its 5,630 total private dwellings, a change of −3.2% from its 2016 population of 13,565. With a land area of 107.55 km^{2} (41.53 sq mi), it had a population density of 122.1/km^{2} (316.3/sq mi) in 2021.

== Sister cities ==
- Pont-du-Château, Auvergne, France

== Notable people ==
- Marius Barbeau, ethnographer
- Elzéar-Henri Juchereau Duchesnay, Canadian politician
- Ernest Savard, hockey executive, head coach, general manager (Montreal Canadiens)
- Nycole Turmel, Canadian politician
- Henri-Jules Juchereau Duchesnay, Canadian politician
- Gabriel-Elzéar Taschereau, Quebec politician
- Elzéar-Alexandre Taschereau, clergyman
- Henri Elzéar Taschereau, lawyer
- Jean-Thomas Taschereau, lawyer
- Joseph-André Taschereau, judge
- Pierre-Elzéar Taschereau, Canadian politician
- Thomas Linière Taschereau, Canadian politician
- Mario Gosselin, NASCAR driver
- Thomas Chabot, ice hockey defenceman for the NHL’s Ottawa Senators
- Roch Thériault, cult leader, convicted murderer
