= Thomas-Jacques Taschereau =

Thomas-Jacques Taschereau (French pronunciation: [tɔma ʒak taʃʁo]; August 26, 1680 – September 25, 1749) was the patriarch of the illustrious Taschereau family in New France (Canada). It is believed that he may have come from some level of nobility in France and his family descended from a line of royal municipal officials. He arrived in New France in 1726 as a private secretary to the Intendant of New France, Claude-Thomas Dupuy.

In 1728 he married a young Canadian girl from nobility, Marie-Claire, daughter of Joseph de Fleury de La Gorgendière. They returned briefly to France and then came back to Canada in 1732. It was then that his most important contribution to the Taschereau family's future took place, mainly establishing their seigneury of Sainte-Marie-de-la-Nouvelle-Beauce. Shortly after he died, but by this point, Taschereau's seigneury was nonetheless well established.

His wife was able to raise and educate their remaining 8 children. The youngest, Gabriel-Elzéar Taschereau, carried on the name and became the second seigneur of Sainte-Marie. One of Gabriel-Elzéar's sisters, Marie-Anne-Louise Taschereau, joined the Ursuline order in Quebec and became superior of the convent.
