= Gabriel-Elzéar Taschereau =

Canadian politician (1745–1809)

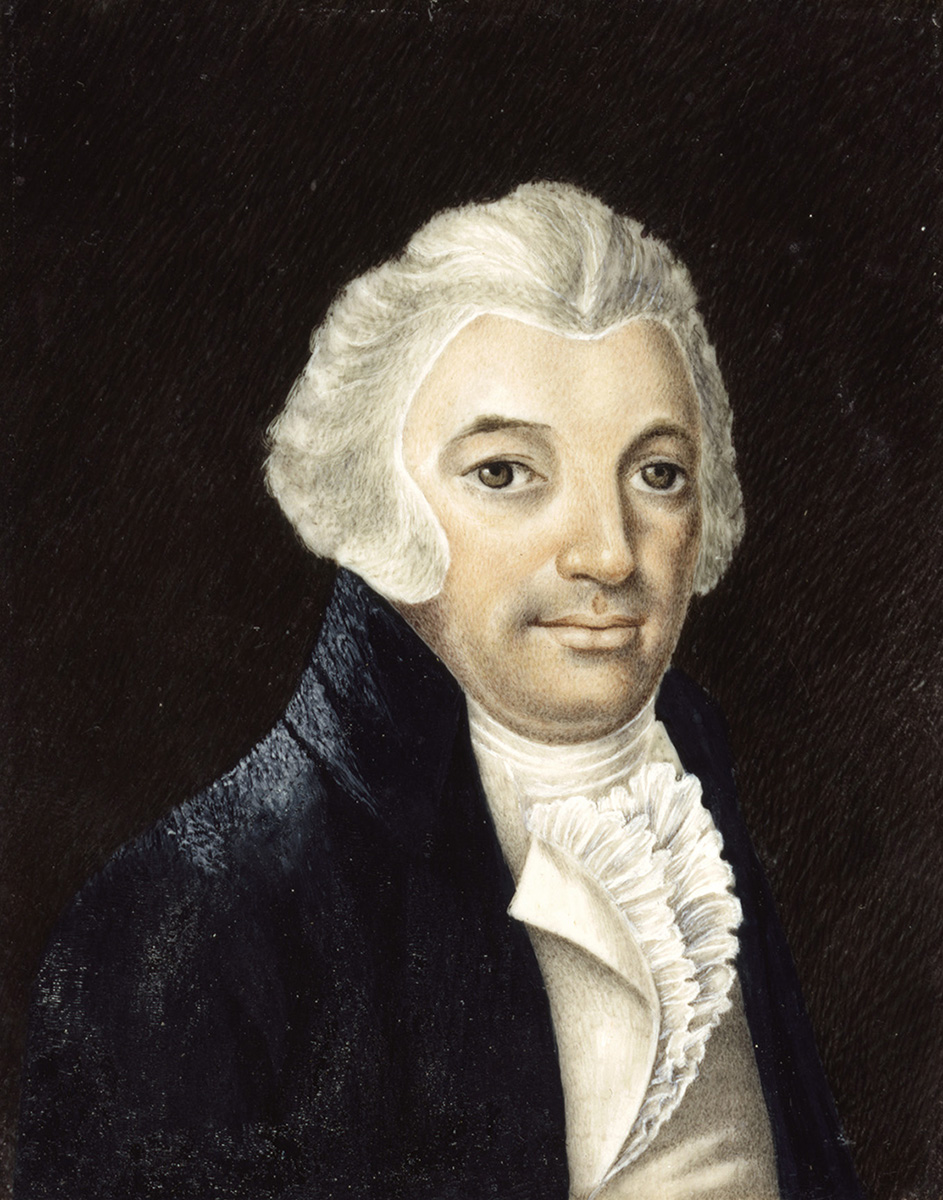
Gabriel-Elzéar Taschereau

Gabriel-Elzéar Taschereau (French pronunciation: [ɡabʁijɛl ɛlzeaʁ taʃʁo]; March 27, 1745 – September 18, 1809) was the second in a line of distinguished French Canadians whose influence has spanned three centuries.

== Biography ==
Gabriel-Elzéar Taschereau was born at Quebec City, the son of Thomas-Jacques Taschereau. At the age of 14, he aided in the defence of the town against the British attack in 1759. He later became a member of the Legislative Assembly and Legislative Council of Lower Canada, as well as a seigneur and a judge. Taschereau inherited the seigneury of Sainte-Marie-de-la-Nouvelle-Beauce from his father and acquired the seigneuries of Jolliet and Saint-Joseph-de-Beauce and a part of Linière, Mingan and Anticosti Island.

He was married twice and both marriages produced offspring that contributed to the growth of the Quebec and Canadian legal systems. His first wife was Marie-Louise-Élisabeth Bazin. His second wife was Louise-Françoise Juchereau Duchesnay (1771-1841), daughter of Antoine Juchereau Duchesnay. One son was Jean-Thomas Taschereau (1778–1832). Jean-Thomas was an MLA, a judge, and a publisher during his lifetime. A second son, Thomas-Pierre-Joseph Taschereau was a lawyer, an MLA and a judge. Taschereau died at Sainte-Marie-de-la-Beauce
