= Claude Morin (Beauce politician) =

Canadian politician (born 1953)

Mayor of Saint-Georges
- In office November 3, 2013 – November 2, 2025
- Preceded by: François Fecteau
- Succeeded by: Manon Bougie

MNA for Beauce-Sud
- In office April 25, 2007 – November 5, 2008
- Preceded by: Diane Leblanc
- Succeeded by: Robert Dutil

Personal details
- Born: August 10, 1953 (age 72) Saint-Gédéon-de-Beauce, Quebec
- Party: Action démocratique du Québec
- Spouse: Anne Desrousseaux

Claude Morin (born August 10, 1953 in Saint-Gédéon-de-Beauce, Quebec) is a politician from Quebec, Canada. He was elected as mayor of Saint-Georges, Quebec in the 2013 Quebec municipal elections. Previously, he was an Action démocratique du Québec Member of the National Assembly for the electoral district of Beauce-Sud from 2007 to 2008.

Morin has a bachelor's degree in social sciences from the University of Ottawa.

Before his election, he worked within the Canadian Forces for over 15 years in Lille, France, Quebec and Chilliwack, British Columbia as an officer and director. He also worked at the Canadian Department of National Defense as the human resources director and at the NATO offices in Naples as a director for transportation. He was also a financial adviser for three years.

Morin was elected in the 2007 Quebec election with 57% of the vote. Liberal incumbent Diane Leblanc finished second with 30% of the vote. Morin took office on April 12, 2007 and was named the Official Opposition's Shadow Minister for Revenue. He was defeated in the 2008 election.

He was defeated as a Liberal Party of Canada candidate in Beauce in the 2011 Canadian federal election.
