= Robert Dutil =

Canadian businessman and politician

Member of the National Assembly of Quebec for Beauce-Sud
- In office December 8, 2008 – September 22, 2015
- Preceded by: Claude Morin
- Succeeded by: Paul Busque
- In office December 2, 1985 – September 12, 1994
- Preceded by: Hermann Mathieu
- Succeeded by: Paul-Eugène Quirion

Personal details
- Born: April 16, 1950 (age 76) Saint-Georges, Quebec
- Party: Quebec Liberal Party
- Cabinet: Minister of Public Safety

Robert Dutil is a Canadian businessman and politician, who was a Quebec Liberal Party member of the National Assembly of Quebec from 1985 to 1994 and from 2008 to 2015.

== Background ==
He was born in Saint-Georges, Quebec on April 16, 1950. He is the grandson of politician Édouard Lacroix and the brother of businessman Marcel Dutil.

== Education ==
Dutil obtained a bachelor's degree in physical education in 1973 and a master's degree in business administration in 1982 both from Laval University.

== Local politics ==
Dutil served in the Saint-Georges City Council as a city councillor from 1975 to 1979 and as mayor from 1979 to 1985. He was a prefect for the Beauce-Sartigan Regional County Municipality from 1982 to 1985.

== Member of the provincial legislature ==
He ran as a Liberal candidate in the provincial district of Beauce-Sud in the 1985 election and won. He was appointed to Premier Robert Bourassa's cabinet in 1985 and was in charge of different portfolios, including communications and supply and services. He was re-elected in the 1989 election, but did not run for re-election in the 1994 election.

In 2008, Dutil founded the Union du centre political party; however, later that year he was elected as the Liberal candidate in the 2008 election in his old district of Beauce-Sud, and the Union du centre party later dissolved without ever running candidates for office.

Dutil became revenue minister on December 18, 2008, replacing Jean-Marc Fournier who did not seek a re-election. Following a 2010 cabinet shuffle, Dutil was named minister of public safety, replacing Jacques Dupuis.

He announced his resignation from the legislature in September 2015.

== Business interests ==
Since 2002, Dutil has been vice-president of Structal-ponts, a division of Canam Manac Group. He was also in the 1970s and 1980s co-owner of several businesses mostly in the Saint-Georges area. He was also president or vice-president for several other small businesses from 1996 to 2008.

== Footnotes ==
Political offices
| Preceded by Jean-Marc Fournier | Minister of Revenue; 2008–2010 | Succeeded by Raymond Bachand |
| Preceded by Jacques P. Dupuis | Minister of Public Security; 2010–2012 | Succeeded by Stéphane Bergeron |
National Assembly of Quebec
| Preceded by Hermann Mathieu (Liberal) | MNA, District of Beauce-Sud (1st time); 1985–1994 | Succeeded by Paul-Eugène Quirion (Liberal) |
| Preceded by Claude Morin | MNA, District of Beauce-Sud (2nd time); 2008–present | Succeeded by incumbent |
Party political offices
| Preceded by Party founded in 2008 | Leader of L’Union du Centre; 2008–Current | Succeeded by Incumbent |
