= Samuel Poulin (politician) =

Canadian politician

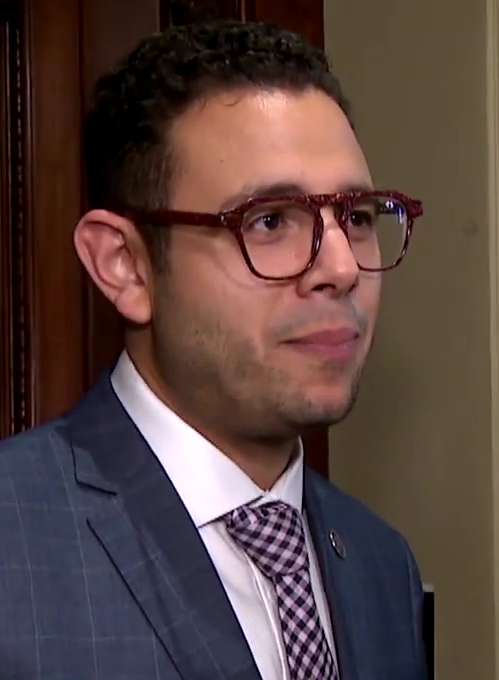
- Poulin in 2023

Quebec Minister of Municipal Affairs
- In office April 21, 2026 – October 21, 2026
- Premier: Christine Fréchette
- Preceded by: Geneviève Guilbault
- Succeeded by: Nicolas Girard

Member of the National Assembly of Quebec for Beauce-Sud
- In office October 1, 2018 – August 27, 2026
- Preceded by: Paul Busque
- Succeeded by: Jonathan Poulin

Personal details
- Born: Morocco
- Party: Coalition Avenir Québec

Samuel Poulin is a Canadian politician, who was elected to the National Assembly of Quebec in the 2018 provincial election. He represented the electoral district of Beauce-Sud as a member of the Coalition Avenir Québec. He has served as a Cabinet minister under Premier François Legault and Premier Christine Fréchette.

== Electoral record ==
2026 Quebec general election: Beauce-Sud
** Preliminary results — Not yet official **
Party	Candidate	Votes	%	±%
Conservative	Jonathan Poulin	21,966	58.19	+14.79
Coalition Avenir Québec	Samuel Poulin	8,467	22.43	–22.12
Parti Québécois	Angèle Bouffard	3,398	9.00	+4.96
Liberal	Alvaro Peressutti	2,940	7.79	+4.96
Québec solidaire	Amélie Carrier	896	2.37	–1.98
Démocratie directe	Ginette Vien	81	0.21	N/A
Total valid votes		37,748	98.97	+0.21
Total rejected ballots		392	1.03	–0.21
Turnout		38,140	75.03	–0.90
Electors on the lists		50,834		
Conservative gain from Coalition Avenir Québec		Swing		+18.46
Source: Élections Québec

2022 Quebec general election: Beauce-Sud
Party	Candidate	Votes	%	±%
Coalition Avenir Québec	Samuel Poulin	16,615	44.55	-18.13
Conservative	Jonathan Poulin	16,187	43.40	+40.92
Québec solidaire	Olivier Fecteau	1,623	4.35	-1.44
Parti Québécois	Jean-François Major	1,505	4.04	-0.07
Liberal	Antoine Poulin	1,057	2.83	-18.00
Parti 51	Hans Mercier	306	0.82	-1.28
Total valid votes		37,293	98.76	
Total rejected ballots		468	1.24	
Turnout		37,761	75.93	
Electors on the lists		49,732		
Coalition Avenir Québec hold		Swing		-40.70

2018 Quebec general election: Beauce-Sud
Party	Candidate	Votes	%	±%
Coalition Avenir Québec	Samuel Poulin	20,936	62.68	+24.46
Liberal	Paul Busque	6,958	20.83	-29.67
Québec solidaire	Diane Vincent	1,934	5.79	+3.63
Parti Québécois	Guillaume Grondin	1,374	4.11	-2.74
Conservative	Milan Jovanovic	830	2.48	+1.55
Parti 51	Hans Mercier	700	2.1	
Green	Cassandre Poulin	500	1.5	
Citoyens au pouvoir	Jean Paquet	170	0.51	
Total valid votes		33,402	98.62	
Total rejected ballots		467	1.38	
Turnout		33,869	69.13	
Eligible voters		48,992		
Coalition Avenir Québec gain from Liberal		Swing		+27.07
Source(s) "Rapport des résultats officiels du scrutin". Élections Québec.

2014 Quebec general election
Party	Candidate	Votes	%	±%
Liberal	Robert Dutil	17,055	50.50	+8.11
Coalition Avenir Québec	Samuel Poulin	12,909	38.22	-2.3
Parti Québécois	Alex Gagnon Lacroix	2,314	6.85	-4.58
Québec solidaire	Diane Vincent	729	2.16	-0.31
Conservative	Stéphane Bégin	315	0.93	–
Option nationale	Vanessa Roy	220	0.65	-0.95
Quebec - Democratic Revolution	Robert Genesse	163	0.48	-0.25
Mon pays le Québec	Jean Paquet	69	0.20	–
Total valid votes		33,774	100.00	–
Total rejected ballots		349	1.02	–
Turnout		34,123	70.80	-4.22
Electors on the lists		48,193	–	–
Liberal hold		Swing		
