= Carrefour Saint-Georges =

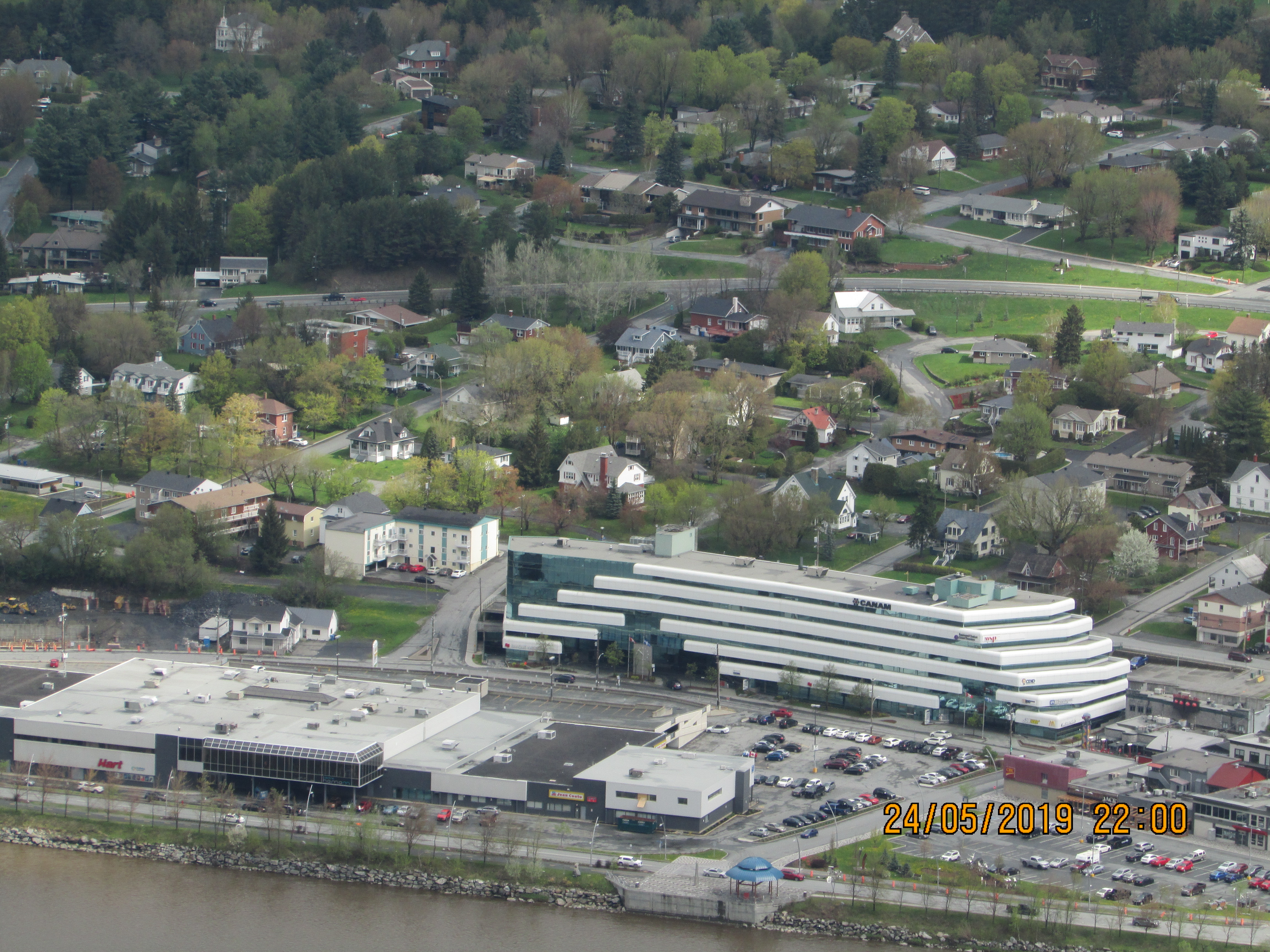
- Carrefour Saint-Georges and Canam head office.
- Location: Saint-Georges, Quebec, Canada
- Coordinates: 46.1218°N 70.6763°W
- Address: 8585, boulevard Lacroix
- Opened: 1974
- Manager: Yvan Fecteau
- Owner: Cominar
- Num. of stores: 68
- Num. of anchor tenants: 3
- Floor area: 304,990 sq ft (28,334 m^{2})
- Floors: 2
- Parking: Outdoor
- Website: carrefourstgeorges.com

The Carrefour Saint-Georges is a shopping centre located in Saint-Georges, Quebec, Canada which opened in 1974. Its current anchors include Super C and Bureau en Gros.

== Brief history ==
The mall opened in 1974 and was then anchored by Zellers, A&P and Greenberg. In 1977, A&P became Provigain and in 1979, became a Provigo.

The mall was completely renovated and expanded in 1992 and a new Sears store was added in a new wing. In 1997, Greenberg was replaced by SAAN. That store later closed and the mall transformed the area into smaller stores. Provigo left the mall in 2002 and the space has been leased by Bureau en Gros.

In 2011, Target Corporation acquired a group of Zellers sites to convert the vast majority of them into Target stores. The Saint-Georges store was among them and was officially confirmed as a future Target store. Zellers closed on March 14, 2013 and Target opened on September 17, 2013 after extensive renovations to the space. Target occupied the space until March 22, 2015 when the store closed its doors following the bankruptcy of Target Canada. Super C then announced they would open a supermarket in nearly half of the former Target space. The store opened in the spring of 2016.

== Anchors and tenants ==
=== Anchors ===
- Super C (40,000 sq ft (3,700 m^{2}))
- Bureau en Gros (26,475 sq ft (2,459.6 m^{2}))
