= Busque (surname) =

Busque is a surname. Notable people with the surname include:

- Melissa Busque (born 1990), Canadian soccer player
- Paul Busque, Canadian politician
