= Survivor Québec 2024 =

Reality television series

- Season 2
- Presented by: Patrice Bélanger
- No. of days: 42
- No. of castaways: 20
- Winner: Ghyslain Octeau-Piché
- Runner-up: Kassandre Bastarache
- Location: El Nido, Palawan, Philippines

Release
- Original network: Noovo
- Original release: 31 March – 16 June 2024

Season chronology
- ← Previous; 2023 Next → 2025

Survivor Québec (season 2), also known as Survivor Québec 2024, is the second season of the Québécois reality television series Survivor Québec. This season consists of 20 contestants competing in two tribes of ten competing against one another to survive and avoid elimination. After 42 days, one will be crowned the Sole Survivor and win the grand prize of $100,000.

The season is presented by Patrice Bélanger and airs on Noovo. On March 4, 2024, more information was revealed about the aftershow, Survivor Québec en prolongation. Unlike the previous season, the aftershow would run for 60 minutes instead of 30 minutes, still on Sunday evenings directly after Sunday episodes. It will be hosted by consultant Jean-Thomas Jobin with the help of collaborators Alex Perron, Alexandre Despatie, Geneviève Hébert-Dumont, Korine Côté and Joël Dandurand. The season premiered on 31 March 2024 and concluded on 16 June 2024, when Ghyslain Octeau-Piché was declared the winner over André Savard and Kassandre Bastarache in a unanimous 8-0-0 jury vote.

== Contestants ==
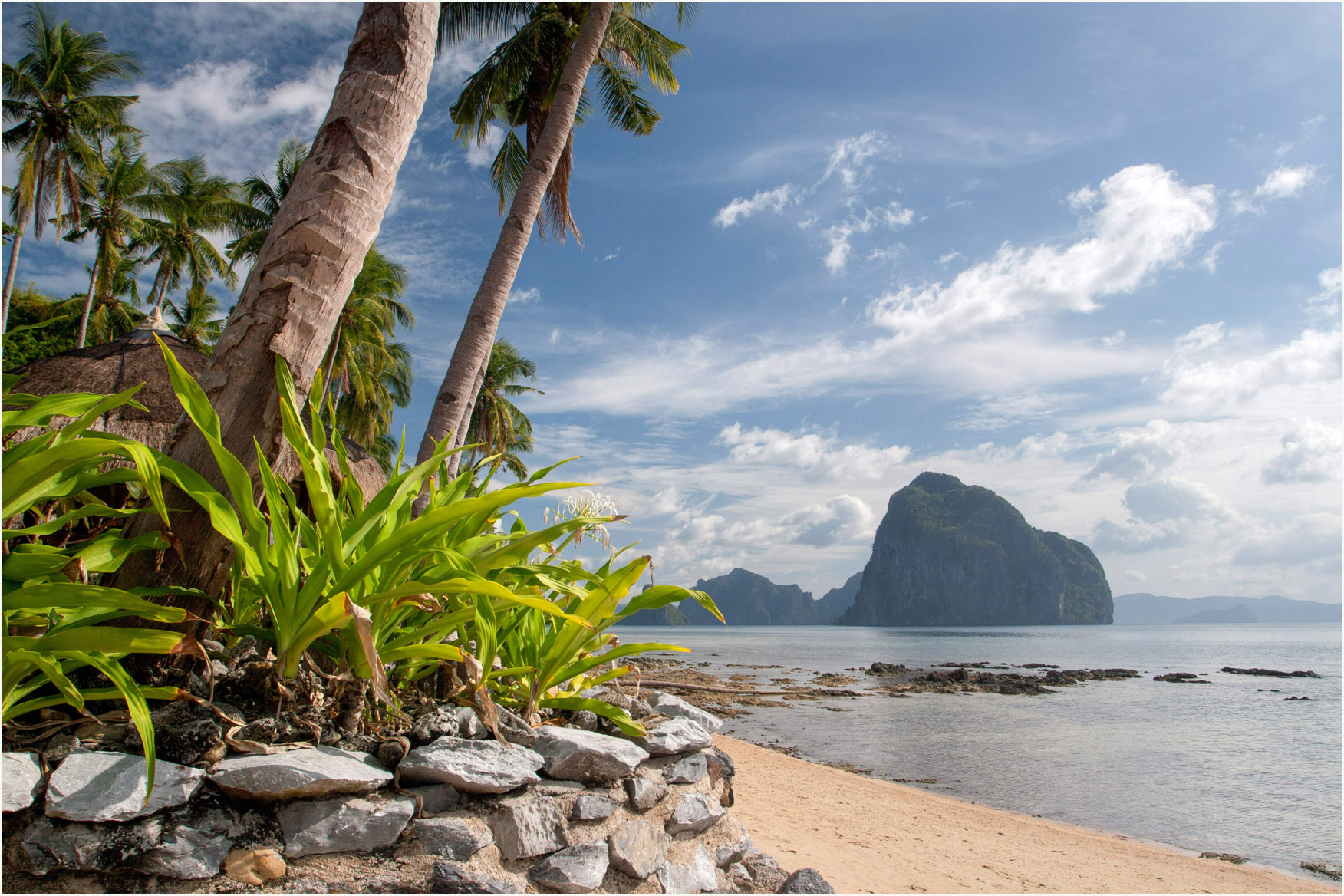
The season was filmed in El Nido, Palawan in the Philippines.

Like the previous season, the cast was revealed prior to filming, on 7 February 2024. The cast included the mayor of Amos, Sébastien D'Astous.

| Contestant | Tribes | | | | | Finish | |
| Contestant | Original | Post-Swap | Reverted | Switched | Merged | Main game | Exile |
|---|---|---|---|---|---|---|---|
| Anabelle Hébert; 35, Shippagan, New Brunswick | Bayani | | | | | Medically evacuated Day 2 | |
| Marie-Noëlle Aubé; 46, Blainville | Nawa | | | | | 1st voted out Day 2 | |
| Caroline Landry; 59, Lac-Beauport | Nawa | | | | | 2nd voted out Day 5 | |
| Charly Clais; 31, Montreal | Bayani | | | | | Quit; Day 6 | |
| Olivier Corneau; 33, Jonquière | Bayani | Bayani | | | | 3rd voted out Day 10 | |
| Audrey Morissette (Returned to game) | Bayani | Bayani | Bayani | | | 4th voted out Day 13 | Returnee; Day 24 |
| Raphaël Merrette; 26, Sainte-Thérèse | Bayani | Bayani | Bayani | | | 5th voted out Day 14 | Quit; Day 20 |
| Dominic Simard; 29, Quebec City | Nawa | Nawa | Nawa | Nawa | | Eliminated; Day 17 | Lost challenge Day 23 |
| Gwladys Breault; 46, Montreal | Nawa | Nawa | Nawa | Nawa | | 7th voted out Day 20 | Lost challenge Day 23 |
| Desneiges Paquin; 32, Montreal | Nawa | Bayani | Nawa | Nawa | | 8th voted out Day 21 | Lost challenge Day 23 |
| Jean-Michel Robichaud; 32, Moncton, New Brunswick | Nawa | Nawa | Nawa | Bayani | Dalawa | 9th voted out 1st jury member Day 25 | |
| Audrey Morissette; 36, Blainville | Bayani | Bayani | Bayani | | Dalawa | 10th voted out 2nd jury member Day 28 | |
| Marilou Côté-Noël; 27, Montreal | Bayani | Bayani | Bayani | Nawa | Dalawa | 11th voted out 3rd jury member Day 31 | |
| Florence Vachon; 24, Saint-Georges-de-Beauce | Bayani | Bayani | Bayani | Nawa | Dalawa | Eliminated; 4th jury member Day 32 | |
| Sébastien D'Astous; 47, Amos | Bayani | Bayani | Bayani | Bayani | Dalawa | 13th voted out 5th jury member Day 35 | |
| Erick Bock; 43, Saint-Hippolyte | Nawa | Nawa | Nawa | Bayani | Dalawa | 14th voted out 6th jury member Day 39 | |
| Déborah De Braekeleer; 39, Saint-Hyacinthe | Bayani | Bayani | Bayani | Bayani | Dalawa | 15th voted out 7th jury member Day 40 | |
| Nabil Elbied; 29, Châteauguay | Nawa | Nawa | Nawa | Bayani | Dalawa | Lost challenge 8th jury member Day 41 | |
| André Savard; 65, Mirabel | Bayani | Bayani | Bayani | Nawa | Dalawa | Co-runners-up; Day 42 | |
| Kassandre Bastarache; 33, Trois-Rivières | Nawa | Nawa | Nawa | Bayani | Dalawa | Co-runners-up; Day 42 | |
| Ghyslain Octeau-Piché; 29, Vaudreuil-Dorion | Nawa | Nawa | Nawa | Bayani | Dalawa | Sole Survivor; Day 42 | |

=== Future Appearances ===
Kassandre Bastarache competed on Australian Survivor: Australia V The World in 2025.

== Challenges ==
| Cycle | Air date | Challenges | | Eliminated | Vote | | | Finish |
| Cycle | Air date | Reward | Immunity | Eliminated | Vote | | | Finish |
|---|---|---|---|---|---|---|---|---|
| Cycle 1 | 31 March 2024 | Nawa | Bayani | Anabelle | None | | | Medically evacuated Day 2 |
| Cycle 1 | 31 March 2024 | Nawa | Bayani | Marie-Noëlle | 9-1 | | | 1st voted out Day 2 |
| Cycle 2 | 1-4 April 2024 | Nawa | Bayani | Caroline | 8-1 | | | 2nd voted out Day 5 |
| Cycle 3 | 7 April 2024 | | Nawa | Charly | None | | | Quit; Day 6 |
| Cycle 4 | 8-11 April 2024 | Bayani | Bayani | Desneiges | 3-2-1-1-1 | | | No elimination due to a tribe swap vote. (Note: On Day 9, the Nawa tribe was subjected to a mock vote. The person who received the most votes, rather than being eliminated, would be swapped to the other tribe. This person would return to their original tribe two days later, given that they still remained in the game.) |
| Cycle 5 | 14 April 2024 | | Nawa | Olivier | 5-3-1 | | | 3rd voted out Day 10 |
| Cycle 6 | 15-18 April 2024 | Nawa; Florence | Nawa | Audrey | 4-2-1 | | | 4th voted out Day 13 |
| Cycle 7 | 21-22 April 2024 | | Nawa; Sebastien | Raphaël | 4-2 | | | 5th voted out Day 14 |
| Cycle 8 | 22-28 April 2024 | Nawa | Bayani | Dominic | 3-3 | 2-2 | Rock draw | Eliminated; Day 17 |
| Cycle 8 | 22-28 April 2024 | Nawa | Bayani | Dominic | 3-3 | 2-2 | Rock draw | Eliminated; Day 17 |
| Cycle 9 | 29 April-2 May 2024 | Bayani | Bayani | Gwladys | 3-1-1 | | | 7th voted out Day 20 |
| Cycle 10 | 5 May 2024 | | Bayani | Desneiges | 3-1 | | | 8th voted out Day 21 |
| Cycle 11 | 6-12 May 2024 | Bayani | Florence | Jean-Michel | 6-5 | | | 9th voted out 1st jury member Day 25 |
| Cycle 12 | 13-19 May 2024 | Déborah, Ghyslain, Kassandre | Kassandre | Audrey | 6-3-1 | | | 10th voted out 2nd jury member Day 28 |
| Cycle 12 | 13-19 May 2024 | Déborah, Marilou | Kassandre | Audrey | 6-3-1 | | | 10th voted out 2nd jury member Day 28 |
| Cycle 13 | 20-23 May 2024 | André, Kassandre, Marilou, Nabil [Erick] | Florence | Marilou | 5-2-2 | | | 11th voted out 3rd jury member Day 31 |
| Cycle 14 | 26-27 May 2024 | | Kassandre | Florence | 3-3-2 | Challenge | | Lost challenge 4th jury member Day 32 |
| Cycle 15 | 27 May-2 June 2024 | Survivor Auction | Déborah | Sébastien | 3-1-1-1 | | | 13th voted out 5th jury member Day 35 |
| Cycle 15 | 27 May-2 June 2024 | Ghyslain [Kassandre, Nabil] | Déborah | Sébastien | 3-1-1-1 | | | 13th voted out 5th jury member Day 35 |
| Cycle 16 | 3-9 June 2024 | Déborah, Erick [Ghyslain] | Déborah | Erick | 4-2 | | | 14th voted out 6th jury member Day 39 |
| Cycle 16 | 3-9 June 2024 | Kassandre [André, Ghyslain] | Déborah | Erick | 4-2 | | | 14th voted out 6th jury member Day 39 |
| Cycle 17 | 10-11 June 2024 | | Ghyslain | Déborah | 4-0 | | | 15th voted out 7th jury member Day 40 |
| Cycle 18 | 12-13 June 2024 | | Ghyslain | Nabil | Challenge | | | Eliminated; 8th jury member Day 41 |
| Cycle 19 | 16 June 2024 | | | | | | | |
| Cycle 19 | 16 June 2024 | | | Jury vote | | | | |
| Cycle 19 | 16 June 2024 | | | André | 8-0-0 | | | Co-runners-up; Day 42 |
| Cycle 19 | 16 June 2024 | | | Kassandre | 8-0-0 | | | Co-runners-up; Day 42 |
| Cycle 19 | 16 June 2024 | | | Ghyslain | 8-0-0 | | | Sole Survivor; Day 42 |

== Voting history ==
| Tribal Phase | Original | | | | | Post-Swap | Reverted | | Switched | | | | | Merged | | | | | | | | | |
|---|---|---|---|---|---|---|---|---|---|---|---|---|---|---|---|---|---|---|---|---|---|---|---|
| Cycle | 1 | | 2 | 3 | 4 | 5 | 6 | 7 | 8 | | | 9 | 10 | 11 | | 12 | 13 | 14 | | 15 | 16 | 17 | 18 |
| Tribe | Bayani | Nawa | Nawa | Bayani | Nawa | Bayani | Bayani | Bayani | Nawa | | | Nawa | Nawa | Dalawa | | Dalawa | Dalawa | Dalawa | | Dalawa | Dalawa | Dalawa | Dalawa |
| Eliminated | Anabelle | Marie-Noëlle | Caroline | Charly | Desneiges | Olivier | Audrey | Raphaël | Tie | Tie | Dominic | Gwladys | Desneiges | Jean-Michel | | Audrey | Marilou | André & Florence | Florence | Sébastien | Erick | Déborah | Nabil |
| Votes | Evacuated | 9-1 | 8-1 | Quit | 3-2-1-1-1 (Note: Four of the eight votes were not publicly confirmed.) | 5-3-1 | 4-2-1 | 4-2 | 3-3 | 2-2 | Rock draw | 3-1-1 | 3-1 | 6-5 | | 6-3-1 | 5-2-2 | 3-3-2 | Challenge | 3-1-1-1 | 4-2 | 4-0 (Note: Kassandre played a hidden immunity idol on herself, negating one vote against her.) | Challenge |
| Voter | Vote | | | | | | | | | | | | | | | | | | | | | | |
| Ghyslain | | Marie-Noëlle | Caroline | | Gwladys | | | | | | | | | None (Note: André used his vote stealer advantage on Ghyslain; therefore Ghyslain was ineligible to vote whereas André voted twice.) | | Audrey | Marilou | Nabil | Safe | Sébastien | Erick | Déborah | Immune |
| André | | | | | | Raphaël | Audrey | Raphaël | Gwladys | None | Immune | Gwladys | Desneiges | Jean-Michel | Jean-Michel | Erick | Marilou | Florence | Won | Immune (Note: André used his Safety Without Power advantage, which allowed him to leave Tribal Council before the votes were cast. Because of this, André was immune but did not cast a vote.) | Erick | Déborah | Won |
| Kassandre | | Marie-Noëlle | Caroline | | Desneiges | | | | | | | | | Marilou | | Audrey | Marilou | Nabil | Safe | Sébastien | Erick | Déborah | Saved |
| Nabil | | Marie-Noëlle | Caroline | | Jean-Michel | | | | | | | | | Jean-Michel | | Audrey | André | André | Safe | Sébastien | André | Déborah | Lost |
| Déborah | | | | | | Olivier | Raphaël | Raphaël | | | | | | Marilou | | Erick | Marilou | Florence | Safe | Nabil | Erick | ~~Kassandre~~ | |
| Erick | | Marie-Noëlle | Caroline | | Nabil | | | | | | | | | Marilou | | Audrey | André | André | Safe | Ghyslain | André | | |
| Sébastien | | | | | | Olivier | Raphaël | Raphaël | | | | | | Marilou | | Erick | Marilou | Florence | Safe | Erick | | | |
| Florence | | | | | | Desneiges | Audrey | Raphaël | Gwladys | Gwladys | Black rock | Gwladys | Desneiges | Jean-Michel | | Audrey | Nabil | André | Lost | | | | |
| Marilou | | | | | | Raphaël | Audrey | Déborah | Gwladys | Gwladys | Black rock | Gwladys | Desneiges | Jean-Michel | | Audrey | Nabil | | | | | | |
| Audrey | | | | | | Olivier | Marilou | | | | | | | Jean-Michel | | Ghyslain | | | | | | | |
| Jean-Michel | | Marie-Noëlle | Caroline | | Desneiges | | | | | | | | | Marilou | | | | | | | | | |
| Desneiges | | Marie-Noëlle | Caroline | | Erick | Olivier | | | André | André | Black rock | Florence | André | | | | | | | | | | |
| Gwladys | | Marie-Noëlle | Caroline | | Desneiges | | | | André | None | Immune | Marilou | | | | | | | | | | | |
| Dominic | | Marie-Noëlle | Caroline | | Erick | | | | André | André | White rock | | | | | | | | | | | | |
| Raphaël | | | | | | Olivier | Audrey | Déborah | | | | | | | | | | | | | | | |
| Olivier | | | | | | Raphaël | | | | | | | | | | | | | | | | | |
| Charly | | | | | | | | | | | | | | | | | | | | | | | |
| Caroline | | Marie-Noëlle | Desneiges | | | | | | | | | | | | | | | | | | | | |
| Marie-Noëlle | | Caroline | | | | | | | | | | | | | | | | | | | | | |
| Anabelle | | | | | | | | | | | | | | | | | | | | | | | |

Jury vote
| Cycle | 19 | | |
|---|---|---|---|
| Day | 42 | | |
| Finalist | Ghyslain | André | Kassandre |
| Votes | 8-0-0 | | |
| Juror | | | |
| Nabil | Yes | | |
| Déborah | Yes | | |
| Erick | Yes | | |
| Sébastien | Yes | | |
| Florence | Yes | | |
| Marilou | Yes | | |
| Audrey | Yes | | |
| Jean-Michel | Yes | | |
