= Beauce-Sud =

Provincial electoral district in Quebec, Canada

Quebec electoral district
- Coordinates: 45.971°N 70.645°W

Provincial electoral district
- Legislature: National Assembly of Quebec
MNA
Jonathan Poulin
Conservative
- District created: 1972
- First contested: 1973
- Last contested: 2026

Demographics
- Population (2006): 60,342
- Electors (2014): 48,193
- Area (km²): 3,003.3
- Pop. density (per km²): 20.1
- Census division(s): Beauce-Sartigan (all), Le Granit (part), Les Appalaches (part), Les Etchemins (part)
- Census subdivision(s): Courcelles-Saint-Évariste, Lac-Poulin, La Guadeloupe, Notre-Dame-des-Pins, Sainte-Aurélie, Saint-Benjamin, Saint-Benoît-Labre, Sainte-Clotilde-de-Beauce, Saint-Côme–Linière, Saint-Éphrem-de-Beauce, Saint-Gédéon-de-Beauce, Saint-Georges, Saint-Hilaire-de-Dorset, Saint-Honoré-de-Shenley, Saint-Ludger, Saint-Martin, Saint-Philibert, Saint-Prosper, Saint-René, Saint-Robert-Bellarmin, Saint-Simon-les-Mines, Saint-Théophile, Saint-Zacharie

Beauce-Sud (French pronunciation: [bos syd]) is a provincial electoral district in the Chaudière-Appalaches and Estrie regions of Quebec, Canada, that elects members to the National Assembly of Quebec. It notably includes the municipalities of Saint-Georges, Saint-Prosper, Saint-Côme-Linière, Saint-Martin, Saint-Éphrem-de-Beauce, and Saint-Gédéon-de-Beauce.

It was created along with Beauce-Nord for the 1973 election from parts of Beauce electoral district, at the same time also gaining a piece of the old Frontenac district.

There were boundary changes elsewhere between the 2001 and 2011 electoral maps, but the territory of Beauce-Sud was unchanged.

== Members of the National Assembly ==
Legislature	Years	Member	Party
Riding created from Beauce and Frontenac
30th	1973–1975	Fabien Roy	Parti créditiste
30th	1975–1975	Fabien Roy	Independent
30th	1975–1976	Fabien Roy	Parti national populaire
31st	1976–1979	Fabien Roy	Parti national populaire
31st	1979–1981	Hermann Mathieu	Liberal
32nd	1981–1985	Hermann Mathieu	Liberal
33rd	1985–1989	Robert Dutil	Liberal
34th	1989–1994	Robert Dutil	Liberal
35th	1994–1996†	Paul-Eugène Quirion	Liberal
35th	1997–1998	Diane Leblanc	Liberal
36th	1998–2003	Diane Leblanc	Liberal
37th	2003–2007	Diane Leblanc	Liberal
38th	2007–2008	Claude Morin	Action démocratique
39th	2008–2012	Robert Dutil	Liberal
40th	2012–2014	Robert Dutil	Liberal
41st	2014–2015	Robert Dutil	Liberal
41st	2015–2018	Paul Busque	Liberal
42nd	2018–2022	Samuel Poulin	Coalition Avenir Québec
43rd	2022–2026	Samuel Poulin	Coalition Avenir Québec
44th	2026–Present	Jonathan Poulin	Conservative

== Election results ==
2026 Quebec general election
** Preliminary results — Not yet official **
Party	Candidate	Votes	%	±%
Conservative	Jonathan Poulin	21,966	58.19	+14.79
Coalition Avenir Québec	Samuel Poulin	8,467	22.43	–22.12
Parti Québécois	Angèle Bouffard	3,398	9.00	+4.96
Liberal	Alvaro Peressutti	2,940	7.79	+4.96
Québec solidaire	Amélie Carrier	896	2.37	–1.98
Démocratie directe	Ginette Vien	81	0.21	N/A
Total valid votes		37,748	98.97	+0.21
Total rejected ballots		392	1.03	–0.21
Turnout		38,140	75.03	–0.90
Electors on the lists		50,834		
Conservative gain from Coalition Avenir Québec		Swing		+18.46
Source: Élections Québec

2022 Quebec general election
Party	Candidate	Votes	%	±%
Coalition Avenir Québec	Samuel Poulin	16,615	44.55	-18.13
Conservative	Jonathan Poulin	16,187	43.40	+40.92
Québec solidaire	Olivier Fecteau	1,623	4.35	-1.44
Parti Québécois	Jean-François Major	1,505	4.04	-0.07
Liberal	Antoine Poulin	1,057	2.83	-18.00
Parti 51	Hans Mercier	306	0.82	-1.28
Total valid votes		37,293	98.76	
Total rejected ballots		468	1.24	
Turnout		37,761	75.93	
Electors on the lists		49,732		
Coalition Avenir Québec hold		Swing		-40.70

2018 Quebec general election
Party	Candidate	Votes	%	±%
Coalition Avenir Québec	Samuel Poulin	20,936	62.68	+24.46
Liberal	Paul Busque	6,958	20.83	-29.67
Québec solidaire	Diane Vincent	1,934	5.79	+3.63
Parti Québécois	Guillaume Grondin	1,374	4.11	-2.74
Conservative	Milan Jovanovic	830	2.48	+1.55
Parti 51	Hans Mercier	700	2.1	
Green	Cassandre Poulin	500	1.5	
Citoyens au pouvoir	Jean Paquet	170	0.51	
Total valid votes		33,402	98.62	
Total rejected ballots		467	1.38	
Turnout		33,869	69.13	
Eligible voters		48,992		
Coalition Avenir Québec gain from Liberal		Swing		+27.07
Source(s) "Rapport des résultats officiels du scrutin". Élections Québec.

Quebec provincial by-election, 9 November 2015
Party	Candidate	Votes	%	±%
Liberal	Paul Busque	9,996	52.21	+1.71
Coalition Avenir Québec	Tom Redmond	6,237	32.57	-5.65
Parti Québécois	Renaud Fortier	1,429	7.46	+0.61
Conservative	Milan Jovanovic	615	3.21	+2.28
Québec solidaire	Diane Vincent	405	2.12	-0.04
Option nationale	Vanessa Roy	290	1.51	+0.86
Independent	Robert Genesse	175	0.91	+0.43
Total valid votes		19,147	98.99	–
Total rejected ballots		195	1.01	-0.01
Turnout		19,342	39.81	-31.00
Eligible voters		48,587		
Liberal hold		Swing		+3.68

2014 Quebec general election
Party	Candidate	Votes	%	±%
Liberal	Robert Dutil	17,055	50.50	+8.11
Coalition Avenir Québec	Samuel Poulin	12,909	38.22	-2.3
Parti Québécois	Alex Gagnon Lacroix	2,314	6.85	-4.58
Québec solidaire	Diane Vincent	729	2.16	-0.31
Conservative	Stéphane Bégin	315	0.93	–
Option nationale	Vanessa Roy	220	0.65	-0.95
Quebec - Democratic Revolution	Robert Genesse	163	0.48	-0.25
Mon pays le Québec	Jean Paquet	69	0.20	–
Total valid votes		33,774	100.00	–
Total rejected ballots		349	1.02	–
Turnout		34,123	70.80	-4.22
Electors on the lists		48,193	–	–
Liberal hold		Swing		

2012 Quebec general election
Party	Candidate	Votes	%	±%
Liberal	Robert Dutil	14,791	42.39	-1.23
Coalition Avenir Québec	Richard Savoie	14,141	40.52	-1.05*
Parti Québécois	Luc Villeneuve	3,987	11.43	+0.81
Québec solidaire	Marie-Claude Verville	861	2.47	+1.34
Option nationale	Vanessa Roy	558	1.60	–
Independent	Jean Rhéaume	302	0.87	–
Quebec - Democratic Revolution	Robert Genesse	256	0.73	–
Total valid votes		34,896	98.72	–
Total rejected ballots		453	1.28	–
Turnout		35,349	74.02	+14.03
Electors on the lists		47,758	–	–

* Result compared to Action démocratique

2008 Quebec general election
Party	Candidate	Votes	%	±%
Liberal	Robert Dutil	12,108	43.62	+13.43
Action démocratique	Claude Morin	11,538	41.57	-15.28
Parti Québécois	André Côté	2,947	10.62	+0.11
Green	Francis Cossette	536	1.93	–
Québec solidaire	Anne-Marie Provost	315	1.13	-1.32
Independent	Léo Doyon	311	1.12	–
Total valid votes		27,755	98.53	–
Total rejected ballots		415	1.47	–
Turnout		28,170	59.99	-14.10
Electors on the lists		46,954	–	–

2007 Quebec general election
Party	Candidate	Votes	%	±%
Action démocratique	Claude Morin	19,361	56.85	+17.13
Liberal	Diane Leblanc	10,283	30.19	-13.61
Parti Québécois	André Côté	3,578	10.51	-5.30
Québec solidaire	Marie-Claude Bisson	834	2.45	+1.78*
Total valid votes		34,056	99.01	–
Total rejected ballots		339	0.99	–
Turnout		34,395	74.09	+1.64
Electors on the lists		46,422	–	–

* Result compared to UFP

2003 Quebec general election
Party	Candidate	Votes	%	
Liberal	Diane Leblanc	14,170	43.80	
Action démocratique	Claude Lemieux	12,852	39.72	
Parti Québécois	Stéphane Pouliot	5,115	15.81	
UFP	Ginette Lewis	216	2.45	
Total valid votes		32,353	98.97	–
Total rejected ballots		336	1.03	–
Turnout		32,689	72.45	
Electors on the lists		45,118	–	

1998 Quebec general election
Party	Candidate	Votes	%	
Liberal	Diane Leblanc	15,784	48.77	
Parti Québécois	Norbert Rodrigue	11,907	36.79	
Action démocratique	Lise Papineau	4,235	13.09	
Socialist Democracy	Berthier Guay	233	0.72	
Independent	Richard Lebreux	131	0.40	
Independent	Lionel Beaudoin	74	0.23	
Total valid votes		32,364	99.11	–
Total rejected ballots		290	0.89	–
Turnout		32,654	76.08	
Electors on the lists		42,919	–	

Quebec provincial by-election, 1997
Party	Candidate	Votes	%	
Liberal	Diane Leblanc	15,570	57.13	
Parti Québécois	Richard Busque	10,414	38.21	
Action démocratique	Richard Lamarche	1,269	4.66	
Total valid votes		27,253	98.44	–
Total rejected ballots		432	1.56	–
Turnout		27,685	67.06	
Electors on the lists		41,284	–	

1995 Quebec referendum
Side	Votes	%
Non	20,823	57.54
Oui	15,365	42.46

1994 Quebec general election
Party	Candidate	Votes	%
Liberal	Paul-Eugène Quirion	13,122	45.18
Parti Québécois	Paul-André Busque	12,958	44.61
Independent	Marcel Turcotte	1,543	5.31
New Democratic	Berthier Guay	856	2.95
Lemon	Daniel Lambert	567	1.95
Total valid votes		29,046	97.86
Total rejected ballots		635	2.14
Turnout		29,681	75.85
Electors on the lists		39,129	–

1992 Charlottetown Accord referendum
Side	Votes	%
Non	15,138	52.84
Oui	13,512	47.16

1989 Quebec general election
Party	Candidate	Votes	%
Liberal	Robert Dutil	18,623	69.78
Parti Québécois	Joël Pinon	5,322	19.94
Green	Yves Castera	2,745	10.28
Total valid votes		26,690	97.49
Total rejected ballots		687	2.51
Turnout		27,377	73.28
Electors on the lists		37,359	–

1985 Quebec general election
Party	Candidate	Votes	%
Liberal	Robert Dutil	19,592	66.12
Parti Québécois	Pier Dutil	9,618	32.46
Christian Socialism	Sylvain Couture	422	1.42
Total valid votes		29,632	98.38
Total rejected ballots		489	1.62
Turnout		30,121	78.80
Electors on the lists		38,225	–

1981 Quebec general election
Party	Candidate	Votes	%
Liberal	Hermann Mathieu	13,393	46.89
Parti Québécois	Bernard Mathieu	13,296	46.54
Union Nationale	Dorila Béland	1,519	5.32
Independent	Clairette Buteau	357	1.25
Total valid votes		28,565	95.00
Total rejected ballots		1,502	5.00
Turnout		30,067	82.95
Electors on the lists		36,246	–

1980 Quebec referendum
Side	Votes	%
Non	16,371	57.45
Oui	12,125	42.55

1976 Quebec general election
Party	Candidate	Votes	%
Parti national populaire	Fabien Roy	17,238	68.24
Liberal	Guy Lebel	5,665	22.43
Parti Québécois	Pierre Pelletier	2,356	9.33
Total valid votes		25,259	98.18
Total rejected ballots		468	1.82
Turnout		25,727	83.62
Electors on the lists		30,768	–

1973 Quebec general election
Party	Candidate	Votes	%
Parti créditiste	Fabien Roy	10,481	46.29
Liberal	Paul-H. Lacasse	9,586	42.34
Parti Québécois	Gabriel Garneau	1,898	8.38
Union Nationale	Alain Lacasse	676	2.99
Total valid votes		22,641	97.98
Total rejected ballots		467	2.02
Turnout		23,108	80.39
Electors on the lists		28,744	–

== See also ==
- List of Quebec provincial electoral districts
- Canadian provincial electoral districts
