= Marika Guay =

Canadian soccer player (born 2000)

Personal information
- Date of birth: January 17, 2000 (age 26)
- Place of birth: Châteauguay, Québec, Canada
- Height: 5 ft 4 in (1.63 m)
- Position: Midfielder

Youth career
- AS Châteauguay
- AS Saint-Lambert
- Lakeshore SC

College career
Years	Team	Apps	(Gls)
2018–2021	Santa Clara Broncos	68	(3)
2024	UQTR Patriotes	11	(3)

Senior career*
Years	Team	Apps	(Gls)
2018	CS Monteuil	6	(4)
2021	CS Monteuil	7	(2)
2022	FC Metz	6	(1)
2024	CS Longueuil	11	(1)
2025	Halifax Tides	15	(1)

International career
2016	Canada U17	2	(0)
2019	Canada U18	2	(0)
2020	Canada U20	3	(0)
- * Club domestic league appearances and goals as of October 17, 2025

Marika Guay (born January 17, 2000) is a Canadian soccer player. She was a contestant on Survivor Québec 2023.

== Early life ==
Guay played youth soccer with AS Châteauguay, AS Saint-Lambert, and Lakeshore SC. In 2017, she captained Team Québec at the 2017 Canada Summer Games, winning the gold medal and being named to the tournament all-star team.

== College career ==
In 2018, Guay began attending Santa Clara University, where she played for the women's soccer team. She made her collegiate debut on August 17, 2018, starting the match against the San Jose State Spartans. At the end of her first season, she was named to the West Coast Conference All-Freshman Team and an All-WCC Honourable Mention. In 2019 and 2021, she was named a WCC All-Academic honorable mention. With the team, she won the 2020 NCAA Division I women's soccer tournament (played in the spring of 2021 due to the COVID-19 pandemic).

In 2024, she began attending the Université du Québec à Trois-Rivières, where she played for the women's soccer team. She was named an RSEQ Second Team All-Star.

== Club career ==
In 2018 and 2021, Guay played with CS Monteuil in the Première ligue de soccer du Québec. On June 9, 2018, she scored a hat trick in a 4–0 victory over the Lakers du Lac St-Louis, earning league Player of the Week honours. She was also named to the 2018 league all-star game roster against the team from League1 Ontario.

In February 2022, Guay signed with French club FC Metz in the Division 2 Féminine. In June 2022, she extended her contract for another season, however, in August 2022, she decided to leave the club.

In 2024, she played with CS Longueuil in Ligue1 Québec.

In March 2025, she signed with Halifax Tides FC in the Northern Super League. On April 26, 2025, she scored the club's first ever goal, in a 4–1 loss to the Calgary Wild, during the club's inaugural match.

== International career ==
In 2016, Guay was named to the Canada U17 for the 2016 FIFA U-17 Women's World Cup.

In 2017, she was named to the Canada U20 for a Three Nations Cup in Australia. She was later named to the squad for the 2020 FIFA U-20 Women's World Cup.

== Survivor Québec ==
In 2023, she was a contestant on the first season of Survivor Québec. She was eliminated on Day 18, finishing in 14th place.
