= Samuel Poulin =

Samuel Poulin may refer to:

- Sam Poulin (ice hockey)
- Samuel Poulin (politician)
