= Jonathan Poulin =

Jonathan Poulin MNA

Member of the National Assembly for Beauce-Sud
- Incumbent
- Assumed office October 5, 2026
- Preceded by: Samuel Poulin

Personal details
- Party: Conservative

Jonathan Poulin is a Canadian politician who is a candidate for the National Assembly of Quebec for Beauce-Sud in the 2026 Quebec general election as a member of the Conservative Party of Quebec.

Poulin was the PCQ candidate for the same riding in 2022, finishing in second with 43.40% of the vote (16,187 votes).

== Electoral record ==
2026 Quebec general election: Beauce-Sud
** Preliminary results — Not yet official **
Party	Candidate	Votes	%	±%
Conservative	Jonathan Poulin	21,966	58.19	+14.79
Coalition Avenir Québec	Samuel Poulin	8,467	22.43	–22.12
Parti Québécois	Angèle Bouffard	3,398	9.00	+4.96
Liberal	Alvaro Peressutti	2,940	7.79	+4.96
Québec solidaire	Amélie Carrier	896	2.37	–1.98
Démocratie directe	Ginette Vien	81	0.21	N/A
Total valid votes		37,748	98.97	+0.21
Total rejected ballots		392	1.03	–0.21
Turnout		38,140	75.03	–0.90
Electors on the lists		50,834		
Conservative gain from Coalition Avenir Québec		Swing		+18.46
Source: Élections Québec

2022 Quebec general election: Beauce-Sud
Party	Candidate	Votes	%	±%
Coalition Avenir Québec	Samuel Poulin	16,615	44.55	-18.13
Conservative	Jonathan Poulin	16,187	43.40	+40.92
Québec solidaire	Olivier Fecteau	1,623	4.35	-1.44
Parti Québécois	Jean-François Major	1,505	4.04	-0.07
Liberal	Antoine Poulin	1,057	2.83	-18.00
Parti 51	Hans Mercier	306	0.82	-1.28
Total valid votes		37,293	98.76	
Total rejected ballots		468	1.24	
Turnout		37,761	75.93	
Electors on the lists		49,732		
Coalition Avenir Québec hold		Swing		-40.70
