= Amélie Veille =

Canadian singer and songwriter (born 1981)

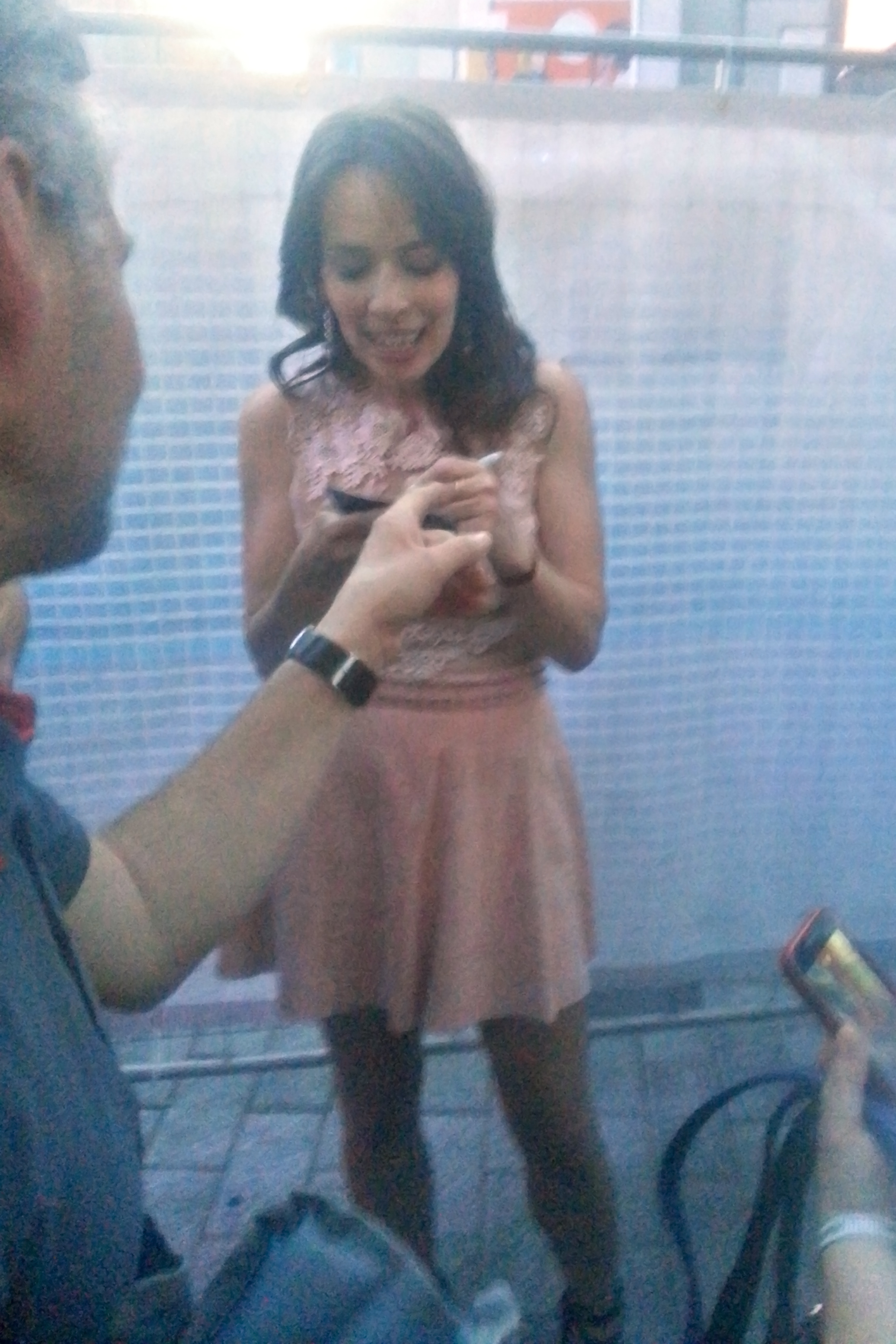

Background information
- Born: September 8, 1981 (age 44); Saint-Georges, Quebec, Canada
- Occupation: Singer-songwriter
- Instrument: Vocals
- Years active: 2003–present
- Labels: Disques Passeport, Disques Vivamusik, Artic
- Website: amelieveille.net

Amélie Veille (born September 8, 1981) is a Canadian singer and songwriter. Veille was born in Saint-Georges, Quebec. Her work has been compared to that of Lynda Lemay.

== Discography ==
- 2003 : Amélie Veille (Disques Passeport)
- 2006 : Un moment ma folie (Disques Vivamusik)
- 2012 : Mon cœur pour te garder (Artic)
- 2016 : Les moments parfaits (Artic)
