= George Pozer =

George Pozer is the anglicised name of Johann Georg Pfotzer (November 21, 1752 – June 16, 1848) who was a merchant, landowner and the fourth Seigneur of Aubert-Gallion.

== Biography ==
Born in Willstätt, he emigrated to England in 1773 and later to the colony of New York where he became a merchant. Being a Loyalist, he left America after the American War of Independence and returned to England. In 1785, he returned to North America and settled in Quebec City. Through endeavours that started with his first grocery store and extended to real estate operations, with money lending and discounting in between, Pozer succeeded in building a fortune over 30 years.

Among his many real estate possessions was the Aubert-Gallion Seigneurie that he bought in 1807. Ten years later, he settled in Aubert-Gallion 189 German immigrants. Most of these immigrants died after a forest clearing spread into a wildfire. After this unsuccessful attempt to settle German compatriots in Aubert-Gallion, Pozer, despite being a Protestant and a Loyalist, began collaborating with the Catholic Church and the francophone population. He gave the land to the Archdiocese of Quebec for the establishment of the parish of Saint-Georges. The choosing of the name "Saint-Georges" is an hommage to George Pozer. He is considered as the founder of Saint-Georges-de-Beauce.

George Pozer was the father of Jacob Pozer and the grandfather of Christian Henry Pozer. He is buried in Mount Hermon Cemetery in Sillery.
