= John Pickel =

Canadian politician

John Pickel (before 1814 – 1860 or later) was a lawyer and political figure in Lower Canada. He represented William-Henry in the Legislative Assembly of Lower Canada from 1834 until the suspension of the constitution in 1838.

He was the son of John Pickel, a Montreal merchant of German descent. Pickel was called to the bar in 1830 and practised in Montreal until 1848 when he moved his practice to Quebec City. In 1838, he married Georgianna Maria Pozer, the niece of Jacob Pozer.
