= Survivor Québec 2025 =

Reality television series

- Season 3
- Presented by: Patrice Bélanger
- No. of days: 42
- No. of castaways: 22
- Winner: Geneviève La Haye
- Runner-up: Rayane Azzoug
- Location: El Nido, Philippines

Release
- Original network: Noovo
- Original release: 30 March – 15 June 2025

Season chronology
- ← Previous; 2024 Next → 2026

Survivor Québec 2025 is the third season of the Québécois reality television series Survivor Québec. This season consists of an expanded cast of 22 contestants competing against each other for prizes, survival and more in the Philippines. After 42 days, one will be crowned the Sole Survivor and win the grand prize of $100,000. The season is presented by Patrice Bélanger and premiered on Noovo on 30 March 2025.

== Contestants ==
List of Survivor Québec 2025 contestants
Contestant	Original Tribe	Expanded Tribe	Switched Tribe	Post-Kidnap Tribe	Merged Tribe	Finish
Félix Laliberté; 26, Montreal	Malaki					1st voted out Day 2
Frédérique Potvin; 36, Saint-Jean-sur-Richelieu	Malaki					2nd voted out Day 5
Huggens Castor; 35, Montreal	Malaki					3rd voted out Day 6
Jérémie Cataphard; 32, Candiac	Ugat					4th voted out Day 9
Mylène Croteau; 43, Gatineau	Ugat	Sapa				5th voted out Day 13
Léanne Lépine Robert; 30, Saint-Hubert	Ugat	Ugat				6th voted out Day 14
Kathrine Huet; 51, Lorraine	Ugat	Ugat				Medically evacuated Day 17
Luc Gratton; 60, Gatineau	Malaki	Ugat				7th voted out Day 18
Kevin Dubé; 34, Sainte-Julie	Malaki	Sapa	Ugat	Ugat		8th voted out Day 22
Élodie Monga-Dubreuil; 30, Gatineau	Malaki	Sapa	Ugat	Ugat		9th voted out Day 23
Sébastien Bénès; 44, Montreal	Ugat	Sapa	Malaki	Malaki	Nanalo	10th voted out Day 25
Sarah Myriam Mazouz; 37, Montreal	Malaki	Malaki	Ugat	Ugat	Nanalo	11th voted out 1st jury member Day 27
André Langlais; 48, Jonquière	Ugat	Malaki	Malaki	Malaki	Nanalo	Lost Duel; 2nd jury member Day 28
Florence Montini; 19, Saint-Adolphe-d'Howard	Malaki	Ugat	Malaki	Ugat	Nanalo	12th voted out 3rd jury member Day 31
Eric Valériote; 46, Sherbrooke	Ugat	Malaki	Ugat	Ugat	Nanalo	13th voted out 4th jury member Day 34
Marilou Chiasson; 31, Saint-Henri	Malaki	Malaki	Ugat	Ugat	Nanalo	14th voted out 5th jury member Day 35
William Robitaille; 30, Quebec City	Ugat	Ugat	Malaki	Malaki	Nanalo	15th voted out 6th jury member Day 39
Ashly Michaud; 25, Laval	Malaki	Ugat	Ugat	Ugat	Nanalo	16th voted out 7th jury member Day 40
Danyelle Bachand; 65, Lac-Beauport	Ugat	Sapa	Malaki	Malaki	Nanalo	Lost Challenge; 8th jury member Day 41
Myriam Taillon; 27, Saguenay	Ugat	Malaki	Ugat	Ugat	Nanalo	2nd Runner-up; Day 42
Rayane Azzoug; 20, Montreal	Malaki	Malaki	Malaki	Malaki	Nanalo	Runner-up; Day 42
Geneviève La Haye; 36, Quebec City	Ugat	Sapa	Malaki	Malaki	Nanalo	Sole Survivor; Day 42

== Challenges ==
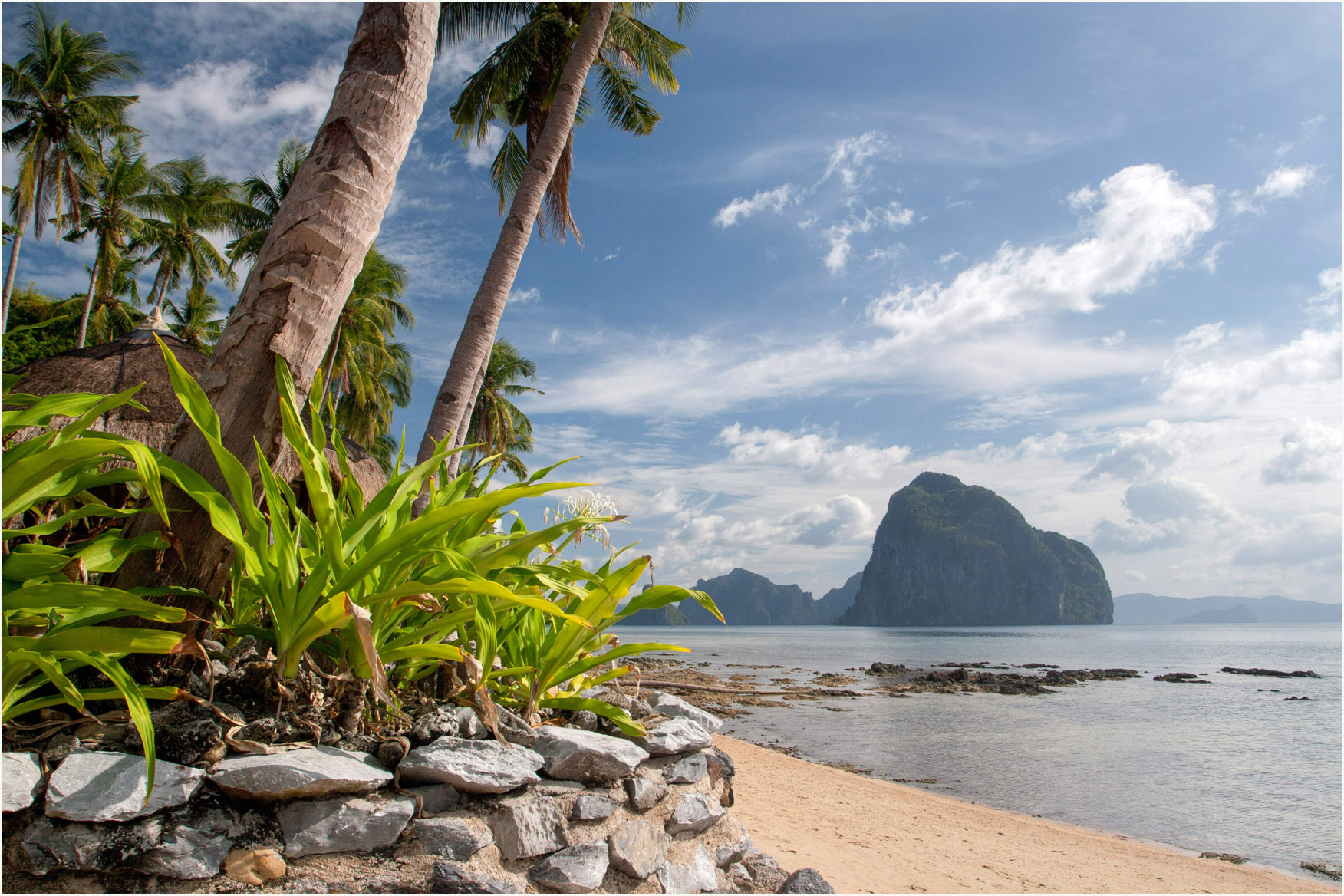
The season was filmed in El Nido, Palawan in the Philippines.

Cycle #	Air date	Challenges			Eliminated	Finish
Cycle #	Air date	Reward	Secondary Reward	Immunity	Eliminated	Finish
1	30 March 2025	Ugat		Ugat	Félix	1st voted out Day 2
2	31 March - 3 April 2025	Ugat		Ugat	Frédérique	2nd voted out Day 5
3	6 April 2025	None		Ugat	Huggens	3rd voted out Day 6
4	7-10 April 2025	Malaki			Jérémie	4th voted out Day 9
4	7-10 April 2025	Jérémie (Note: Malaki was instructed to invite one member from Ugat to join them for their reward. They chose to invite Jérémie.)		Myriam (Note: A special individual immunity challenge was held for the Ugat tribe, which was won by Myriam.)	Jérémie	4th voted out Day 9
5	13 April 2025	None		Ugat	Kevin	No elimination on day 10 due to a secret tribe swap vote.
6	14-17 April 2025	Malaki	Malaki		Mylène	5th voted out Day 13
6	14-17 April 2025	Sapa	Ugat		Mylène	5th voted out Day 13
7	20 April 2025	Sapa			Léanne	6th voted out Day 14
7	20 April 2025	Malaki			Léanne	6th voted out Day 14
8	21-24 April 2025	Sapa			Kathrine	Medically evacuated Day 17
8	21-24 April 2025	None		Malaki	Kathrine	Medically evacuated Day 17
9	27 April 2025 - TBD	TBD	TBD	TBD	TBD	TBD

== Voting history ==
#	Original Tribe						Switched Tribe				
Cycle	1	2	3	4		5	6	7		8	9
Tribe	Malaki	Malaki	Malaki	Ugat		Malaki	Sapa	Ugat		Ugat	
Eliminated	Félix	Frédérique	Huggens	Jérémie		Kevin (Note: Instead of voting someone out at Tribal Council, the Malaki tribe had to vote somebody to be sent to another island; unbeknownst to Malaki, this person would become the first member of the new Sapa tribe.)	Mylène	Léanne		Kathrine	
Votes	8-1-1	7-2	8-1	6-4-1		6-2	5-1	4-2		Evacuated	
André				Jérémie							
Ashly	Félix	Frédérique	Huggens			Kevin		Léanne			
Danyelle				Immune (Note: As the leader of her tribe, Danyelle was immune for the first tribal council but unable to vote.)			Mylène				
Élodie	Félix	None (Note: Élodie lost their vote during a journey challenge, making them ineligible to vote at the Tribal Council.)	Huggens			Luc	Mylène				
Eric				Mylène							
Florence	Félix	Frédérique	Huggens			Kevin		Léanne			
Geneviève				Sébastien	Sébastien (Note: Geneviève used her extra vote, which allowed her to vote twice.)		Mylène				
Kevin	Félix	Frédérique	Huggens			Luc	Mylène				
Luc	Félix	Frédérique	Huggens			Kevin		Léanne	Léanne (Note: Luc used his Steal-a-Vote advantage on William; therefore William was ineligible to vote while Luc voted twice.)		
Marilou	Félix	Frédérique	Huggens			Kevin					
Myriam				Jérémie							
Rayane	Luc	Frédérique	Huggens			Kevin					
Sarah	Félix	Frédérique	Huggens			Kevin					
Sébastien				Jérémie			Mylène				
William				Sébastien				None			
Kathrine				Jérémie				Luc			
Léanne				Jérémie				Luc			
Mylène				Jérémie			Danyelle				
Jérémie				Sébastien							
Huggens	Immune (Note: As the leader of his tribe, Huggens was immune for the first tribal council but unable to vote.)	Luc	Luc								
Frédérique	Félix	Luc									
Félix	Sarah										
