= Survivor Québec 2026 =

Reality television series

- Season 4
- Presented by: Patrice Bélanger
- No. of days: 40
- No. of castaways: 18
- Winner: Kathrine Huet
- Runner-up: Isabelle Gauvin
- Location: Pearl Islands, Panama
- No. of episodes: 67

Release
- Original network: Noovo
- Original release: April 5 – June 14, 2026

Season chronology
- ← Previous; 2025 Next → 2027

Survivor Québec 2026 is the fourth season of the Québécois reality television series Survivor Québec. This season brings the show to a new location, taking place in the Pearl Islands of Panama where 18 contestants compete against each other for the grand prize of $100,000. The show airs on Noovo and is once again presented by Patrice Bélanger. The season premiered on 5 April 2026.

== Contestants ==
Notable cast members include Kathrine Huet who was medically evacuated on Survivor Québec 2025, Isabelle Gauvin, the wife of entrepreneur Luc Poirier and Kate Vercheval, the daughter of former CFL player Pierre Vercheval.

List of Survivor Québec 2026 contestants
Contestant	Original Tribe	Swapped Tribe	Dissolved Tribe	Merged Tribe	Finish
Kelly-Ann Gallien; 23, Grand-Bouctouche, New Brunswick	Wila				1st Voted Out; Day 2
Martin Tremblay; 50, Chicoutimi	Nali				2nd Voted Out; Day 4
Benjamin Paré; 31, Otterburn Park	Wila	Wila	Nali		3rd Voted Out; Day 8
Timmy Labourdette; 35, Paspébiac	Nali	Nali	Suggu		4th Voted Out; Day 9
Aya Kouamé; 35, Montreal	Wila	Wila	Nali		Lost Duel; Day 12
Maryéva Métellus; 38, Montreal	Nali	Nali	Suggu		5th Voted Out; Day 15
Elise Villeneuve; 48, Lac-Supérieur	Wila	Wila	Suggu		6th Voted Out; Day 16
Jacques Fadous; 38, Quebec City	Suggu	Suggu	Suggu		7th Voted Out; Day 18
Kate Vercheval; 27, Montreal	Suggu	Suggu	Nali	Barú	8th Voted Out; 1st Jury Member; Day 20
Karol Ann Jacques; 32, Chicoutimi	Nali	Nali	Nali	Barú	9th Voted Out; 2nd Jury Member; Day 21
Rémi Babeu; 34, Saint-Jean-sur-Richelieu	Nali	Nali	Nali	Barú	Lost Duel; 3rd Jury Member; Day 24
Simon Gagnon-Brassard; 36, Saguenay	Suggu	Suggu	Suggu	Barú	10th Voted Out; Removed from Jury; Day 28 (Note: On Day 33, the remaining contestants voted to remove one member of the jury for final tribal council.)
Alex Guay-Bastien; 31, Montreal	Suggu	Suggu	Nali	Barú	11th Voted Out; 5th Jury Member; Day 31
Maria Gutierrez; 32, Trois-Rivières	Suggu	Suggu	Nali	Barú	12th Voted Out; 6th Jury Member; Day 35
Stéphan Lessard; 34, Terrebonne	Wila	Wila	Suggu	Barú	13th Voted Out; 7th Jury Member; Day 37
Jean-Marie Kiminou; 32, Brossard	Wila	Wila	Nali	Barú	14th Voted Out; 8th Jury Member; Day 39
Isabelle Gauvin; 46, Candiac	Suggu	Nali	Suggu	Barú	Runner-up; Day 40
Kathrine Huet; 52, Lorraine; 2025	Nali	Nali	Suggu	Barú	Sole Survivor; Day 40

== Challenges ==
Cycle #	Air date	Challenges		Eliminated	Finish
Cycle #	Air date	Reward	Immunity	Eliminated	Finish
1	April 5, 2026	Willa	Nali	Kelly-Ann	1st Voted Out; Day 2
1	April 5, 2026	Nali	Suggu	Kelly-Ann	1st Voted Out; Day 2
2	April 6-12, 2026			Martin	2nd Voted Out; Day 4

== Voting history ==
#	Original Tribe	
Cycle	1	2
Eliminated	Kelly-Ann	
Votes	3-2	
Alex		
Aya	Elise	
Benjamin	Kelly-Ann	
Elise	None (Note: Elise used her Roll of the Dice making her ineligible to vote at tribal council.)	
Isabelle		
Jacques		
Jean-Marie	Kelly-Ann	
Karol Ann		
Kate		
Kathrine		
Maria		
Martin		
Maryéva		
Rémi		
Simon		
Stéphan	Kelly-Ann	
Timmy		
Kelly-Ann	Elise	
