= Survivor Québec 2023 =

- Season 1
- Presented by: Patrice Bélanger
- No. of days: 44
- No. of castaways: 20
- Winner: Nicolas Brunette
- Runners-up: Christophe Tiffet; Kimberly Fortin
- Location: El Nido, Palawan, Philippines

Release
- Original network: Noovo
- Original release: 2 April – 18 June 2023

Additional information
- Filming dates: 29 January – 25 March 2023

Season chronology
- Next → 2024

Survivor Québec season 1, also referred to as Survivor Québec 2023, is the first season of the Québécois reality television series Survivor Québec. This season consists of 20 castaways competing in two tribes of ten, while also competing against one another to survive and avoid elimination. After 44 days, one will be crowned the Sole Survivor and win the grand prize of $100,000.

The season is presented by Patrice Bélanger and airs on Noovo. The season premieres on 2 April 2023. Benoît Gagnon hosts an aftershow, Survivor en prolongation, on Sunday evenings directly after Sunday episodes.

== Contestants ==
Contestant	Tribe				Finish	
Contestant	Original	Swapped	Switched	Merged	Main Game	Redemption Island
Martin Cousineau; 52, Saint-Jean-sur-Richelieu	Kalooban				1st voted out Day 3	
Simon Paradis-Lacroix; 21, Quebec City	Tiyaga				2nd voted out Day 6	
Vicky Côté Pierre; 42, Gatineau	Kalooban				3rd voted out Day 7	
Isabelle Gagnon; 52, Terrebonne	Tiyaga				4th voted out Day 10	
Sylvain Béland; Returned to Game	Kalooban				5th voted out Day 11	
Johannie Thériault; 38, Anse-Bleue, New Brunswick	Tiyaga	Tiyaga			Quit; Day 14	
Denis Potapov; 33, Varennes	Kalooban	Kalooban			6th voted out Day 15	
Marika Guay; 23, Trois-Rivières	Tiyaga	Tiyaga	Tiyaga		7th voted out Day 18	
Pierre-Alexandre Guillot; 43, Drummondville	Kalooban	Kalooban	Kalooban		Ejected; Day 19	
Martine Larose Reda; 47, Lorraine	Kalooban	Kalooban	Tiyaga		8th voted out Day 20	
Marcus "Sango" Bien-Aimé; 28, Saint-Hubert	Tiyaga	Tiyaga	Tiyaga	Pag-Asa	11th voted out Day 26	Lost duel 1; 1st jury member Day 28
Joël Dandurand; 29, Saint-Jean-sur-Richelieu	Tiyaga	Tiyaga	Kalooban	Pag-Asa	12th voted out Day 30	Lost duel 2; 2nd jury member Day 31
Maryse Lauzon; 27, Montreal	Kalooban	Kalooban	Tiyaga	Pag-Asa	13th voted out Day 34	Lost duel 3; 3rd jury member Day 35
Sylvain Béland; 41, Gatineau	Tiyaga	Kalooban	Kalooban	Pag-Asa	9th voted out Day 23	Lost duel 4; 4th jury member Day 38
Sandrine Fortier; 25, Trois-Rivières	Tiyaga	Tiyaga	Kalooban	Pag-Asa	14th voted out Day 37	Lost duel 4; 5th jury member Day 38
Nicolas Brunette; Returned to Game	Kalooban	Kalooban	Kalooban	Pag-Asa	10th voted out Day 23	Returnee; Day 38
Jean-Junior Morin; 41, Victoriaville	Tiyaga	Tiyaga	Tiyaga	Pag-Asa	15th voted out 6th jury member Day 41	
Justine Turpin; 25, Gatineau	Kalooban	Kalooban	Kalooban	Pag-Asa	16th voted out 7th jury member Day 42	
Karine Lavigne-Fortin; 37, Chelsea	Kalooban	Kalooban	Tiyaga	Pag-Asa	17th voted out 8th jury member Day 43	
Kimberly Fortin; 25, Mascouche	Tiyaga	Tiyaga	Kalooban	Pag-Asa	Co-runners-up; Day 44	
Christophe Tiffet; 40, Boisbriand	Tiyaga	Tiyaga	Tiyaga	Pag-Asa	Co-runners-up; Day 44	
Nicolas Brunette; 24, Gatineau	Kalooban	Kalooban	Kalooban	Pag-Asa	Sole Survivor; Day 44	

== Season summary ==
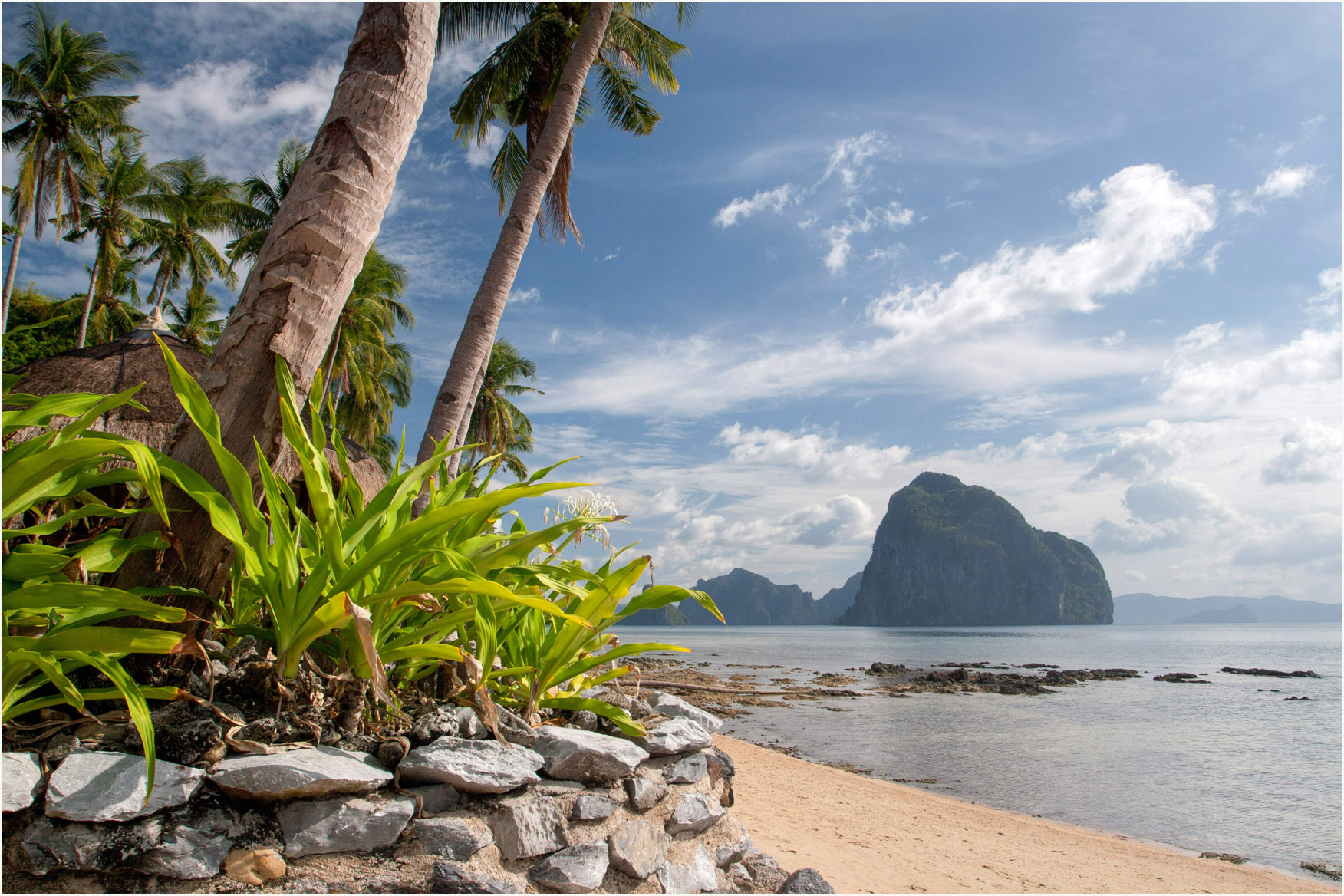
The season was filmed in El Nido, Palawan in the Philippines.

Cycle		Redemption Island		Challenge winner(s)		Eliminated	
No.	Air date	Winner	Eliminated	Reward	Immunity	Tribe	Player
1	2 April 2023	None		Tiyaga	Tiyaga	Kalooban	Martin
2	3–6 April 2023	None		Tiyaga	Kalooban	Tiyaga	Simon
3	9 April 2023	None		Tiyaga		Kalooban	Vicky
4	10–13 April 2023	None		Tiyaga	Kalooban	Tiyaga	Isabelle
5	16 April 2023	None		None	Tiyaga	None (Note: Mock vote.)	
6	17–20 April 2023	None		Tiyaga	Kalooban	Tiyaga	Johannie (Note: Quit.)
7	23 April 2023	None		None	Tiyaga	Kalooban	Denis
8	24–27 April 2023	None		Tiyaga	Kalooban	Tiyaga	Marika
8	24–27 April 2023	None		[Kimberly]	Kalooban	Tiyaga	Marika
9	30 April 2023	None		None		Kalooban	Pierre-Alexandre
9	30 April 2023	None		Kalooban		Tiyaga	Martine
10	1–4, 7–8 May 2023	None		Tiyaga	Joel	Pag-Asa	Sylvain
10	1–4, 7–8 May 2023	None		Tiyaga	Joel	Pag-Asa	Sylvain
10	1–4, 7–8 May 2023	None		None	Maryse	Pag-Asa	Nicolas
11	9–11, 14 May 2023	None		~~Jean-Junior~~ [Justine], Maryse, Sandrine, Sango	Jean-Junior	Pag-Asa	Sango
11	9–11, 14 May 2023	None		Auction	Jean-Junior	Pag-Asa	Sango
12	15–18, 21 May 2023	Nicolas	Sango	Christophe [Jean-Junior, Sandrine]	Kimberly	Pag-Asa	Joël
12	15–18, 21 May 2023	Sylvain	Sango	Christophe [Jean-Junior, Sandrine]	Kimberly	Pag-Asa	Joël
13	22–25, 28 May 2023	Nicolas	Joël	Maryse	Jean-Junior	Pag-Asa	Maryse
13	22–25, 28 May 2023	Sylvain	Joël	Maryse	Jean-Junior	Pag-Asa	Maryse
14	29 May–4 June 2023	Nicolas	Maryse	Karine [Christophe, Jean-Junior]	Christophe	Pag-Asa	Sandrine
14	29 May–4 June 2023	Sylvain	Maryse	Karine [Christophe, Jean-Junior]	Christophe	Pag-Asa	Sandrine
15	5–8, 11 June 2023	Nicolas (Note: Returned to the game upon winning the Redemption Island challenge.)	Sylvain	Jean-Junior [Karine, Kimberly]	Karine	Pag-Asa	Jean-Junior
15	5–8, 11 June 2023	Nicolas	Sandrine	Jean-Junior [Karine, Kimberly]	Karine	Pag-Asa	Jean-Junior
16	12–13 June 2023	None		None	Karine	Pag-Asa	Justine
17	14–15, 18 June 2023	None		None	Nicolas	Pag-Asa	Karine

== Voting history ==
	Original tribes					Post-swap tribes		Switched tribes			Merged tribe									
Cycle	1	2	3	4	5	6	7	8	9		10	11	13	15		17	19	21	22	23
Day	3	6	7	10	11 (Note: On day 11, a Tribal Council was held where the tribe unknowingly voted for a castaway to be swapped to the other tribe.)	14	15	18	19	20	23		26	30		34	37	41	42	43
Tribe	Kalooban	Tiyaga	Kalooban	Tiyaga	Kalooban	Tiyaga	Kalooban	Tiyaga	Kalooban	Tiyaga	Pag-Asa	Pag-Asa	Pag-Asa	Pag-Asa		Pag-Asa	Pag-Asa	Pag-Asa	Pag-Asa	Pag-Asa
Eliminated	Martin	Simon	Vicky	Isabelle	Sylvain	Johannie	Denis	Marika	Pierre-Alexandre	Martine	Sylvain	Nicolas	Sango	Joel		Maryse	Sandrine	Jean-Junior	Justine	Karine
Votes	9-1	9-1	6-3	5-3-1	6-2	None	3-2-2	4-3	None	5-1	5-3-3	2-0-0 (Note: Sango played a hidden immunity idol on Kimberly and Joel played a hidden immunity idol on himself; therefore, one vote against Kimberly and seven votes against Joel were not counted.)	5-4	4-2-2-1		4-3	4-2	3-1-0 (Note: Karine played a hidden immunity idol on Christophe; therefore, two votes cast against Christophe did not count.)	3-1	3-1
Voter	Vote																			
Nicolas	Martin		Vicky		Sylvain		Martine				Kimberly	~~Joel~~						Jean-Junior	Justine	Karine
Christophe		Simon		Johannie				Marika		Martine	Nicolas	Nicolas	Sango	Joel		Maryse	Sandrine	Jean-Junior	Justine	Karine
Kimberly		Simon		Isabelle							Sylvain	~~Joel~~	Sango	Joel		Maryse	Sandrine	Jean-Junior	Justine	Karine
Karine	Martin		Vicky		Sylvain		Denis	Marika		Martine	Sylvain	~~Joel~~	Sango	Sandrine		Sandrine	Justine	~~Christophe~~	None (Note: Karine's vote was blocked by Christophe at Tribal Council.)	Kimberly
Justine	Martin		Vicky		Sylvain		Martine				Sylvain	~~Joel~~	Sango	Joel		Sandrine	Sandrine	~~Christophe~~	Christophe	
Jean-Junior		Simon		Johannie				Marika		Martine	Sylvain	Nicolas	Sango	Joel		Maryse	Sandrine	Nicolas		
Sandrine		Simon		Isabelle							Sylvain	~~Joel~~	Christophe	Christophe	Christophe (Note: Sandrine used an extra vote advantage, allowing her to cast two ballots during a single vote.)	Maryse	Justine			
Maryse	Martin		Vicky		Nicolas		Denis	Christophe		Martine	Nicolas	~~Joel~~	Christophe	Karine		Sandrine				
Joel		Simon		Isabelle							Kimberly	~~Kimberly~~	Christophe	Karine						
Sango		Simon		Johannie				Marika		Martine	Nicolas	~~Joel~~	Christophe							
Sylvain	Martin		Justine		Nicolas						Kimberly									
Martine	Martin		Vicky		Sylvain		Maryse	Christophe		Maryse										
Pierre-Alexandre	Martin		Justine		Sylvain		Denis		Ejected (Note: Pierre-Alexandre was ejected from the game.)											
Marika		Simon		Isabelle				Christophe												
Denis	Martin		Vicky		Sylvain		Maryse													
Johannie		Simon		Isabelle		Quit														
Isabelle		Simon		Sango																
Vicky	Martin		Justine																	
Simon		Christophe																		
Martin	Vicky																			

Jury vote
Cycle	23		
Day	44		
Finalist	Christophe	Kimberly	Nicolas
Votes	6–1–1		
Juror	Vote		
Karine			Yes
Justine			Yes
Jean-Junior	Yes		
Sandrine			Yes
Sylvain		Yes	
Maryse			Yes
Joel			Yes
Sango			Yes
