= Jacob Pozer =

Canadian politician

Jacob Pozer (1777 – October 15, 1822) was a businessman and political figure in Lower Canada. He represented William-Henry in the Legislative Assembly of Lower Canada from 1812 to 1814.

He was born in Schoharie, New York or New York City, the son of Johann Georg "George" Pfotzer and Magdalen Sneider, and went to England with his parents in 1783. In 1785, the family came to Quebec City. Pozer entered his father's business, later going into business on his own. He operated a brewery leased from John Young and was also involved in farming and raising horses. Pozer lived in William Henry for a number of years. In 1802, he married Ann Dorge there. He was elected to the assembly in an 1812 by-election held after Edward Bowen was named to the bench; Pozer did not run for reelection in 1814. He died in Quebec City.

His niece Georgianna Maria Pozer married John Pickel.
