= Marcel Dutil =

Canadian businessman (born 1942)

Marcel Dutil CM CQ
- Born: 1942 (age 82–83); Saint-Georges, Quebec, Canada
- Occupation(s): Businessman, entrepreneur

Marcel Dutil CM CQ (born 1942 in Saint-Georges, Quebec) is a Canadian businessman and the grandson of Édouard Lacroix.

In 1961, he began working as a welder at Canam Steel Works, a company founded by his father, Roger Dutil, in 1960. In 1962, Dutil worked in Canam Steel Works' Boston office before returning to Saint-Georges to get his high school diploma. Dutil continued working at Canam's plant in Saint-Georges and, while doing so, Dutil founded his own company, Manac, which manufactured trailers. In 1972, Dutil bought his father's company, now known as the Canam Group, an international company that fabricates steel and construction products. Dutil led Canam Group until 2012, when he transferred leadership of the company to his son, Marc. That same year, Dutil turned over leadership of Manac to his other son, Charles.
