= Survivor Québec =

- Created by: Charlie Parsons
- Country of origin: Canada
- Original language: French
- No. of seasons: 4

Original release
- Network: Noovo
- Release: 2 April 2023 – present

Related
- Survivor

Survivor Québec is a Canadian reality show based on Survivor. It premiered on Noovo on 2 April 2023.

The first season was filmed from January to March 2023 in the Philippines. Twenty contestants participated in the competition. The winner of the show received CA$100,000. The show is hosted by Patrice Bélanger.

== Format ==
The show follows the same general format as the other editions of Survivor. To begin, the players are split into two tribes and taken to a remote, isolated location. They are forced to live off the land with meagre supplies for several weeks. Frequent physical and mental challenges are used to pit the tribes against each other for rewards such as food, luxuries, or for immunity, forcing the other tribe to attend Tribal Council, where they must vote one of their tribemates out of the game by secret ballot.

About halfway through the game, the tribes are merged into a single tribe, and challenges are on an individual basis; winning immunity prevents that player from being voted out. Most players voted out during this stage become members of the Tribal Council Jury. When only three players remain, the Final Tribal Council is held. The finalists plead their case to the Jury about why they should win the game. The jurors then have the opportunity to interrogate the finalists before casting their vote for which finalist should be awarded the title of Sole Survivor and win the grand prize of $100,000.

== Season overview ==
Season	Location	Host	Channel	Castaways	Winner	Grand Prize	First aired	Last aired
2023	El Nido, Palawan, Philippines	Patrice Bélanger	Noovo	20	Nicolas Brunette	$100,000	2 April 2023	18 June 2023
2024	El Nido, Palawan, Philippines	Patrice Bélanger	Noovo	20	Ghyslain Octeau-Piché	$100,000	31 March 2024	16 June 2024
2025	El Nido, Palawan, Philippines	Patrice Bélanger	Noovo	22	Geneviève La Haye	$100,000	30 March 2025	15 June 2025
2026	Pearl Islands, Panama	Patrice Bélanger	Noovo	18	Kathrine Huet	$100,000	5 April 2026	14 June 2026
2027	Pearl Islands, Panama	Patrice Bélanger	Noovo	TBD	TBD	$100,000	Spring 2027	Summer 2027
