= Saint-Gédéon-de-Beauce =

- Municipality
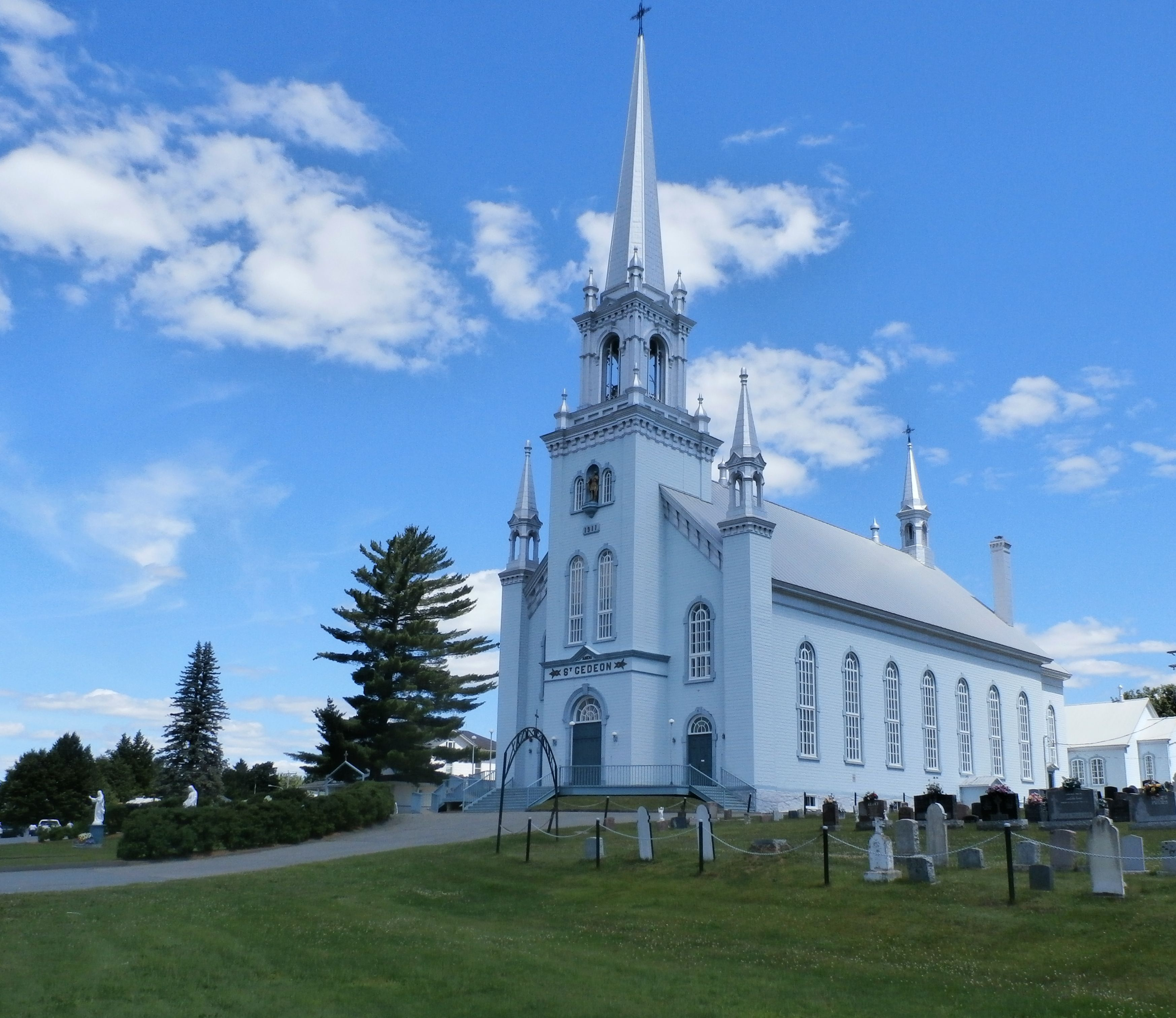
- Church of Saint-Gédéon-de-Beauce

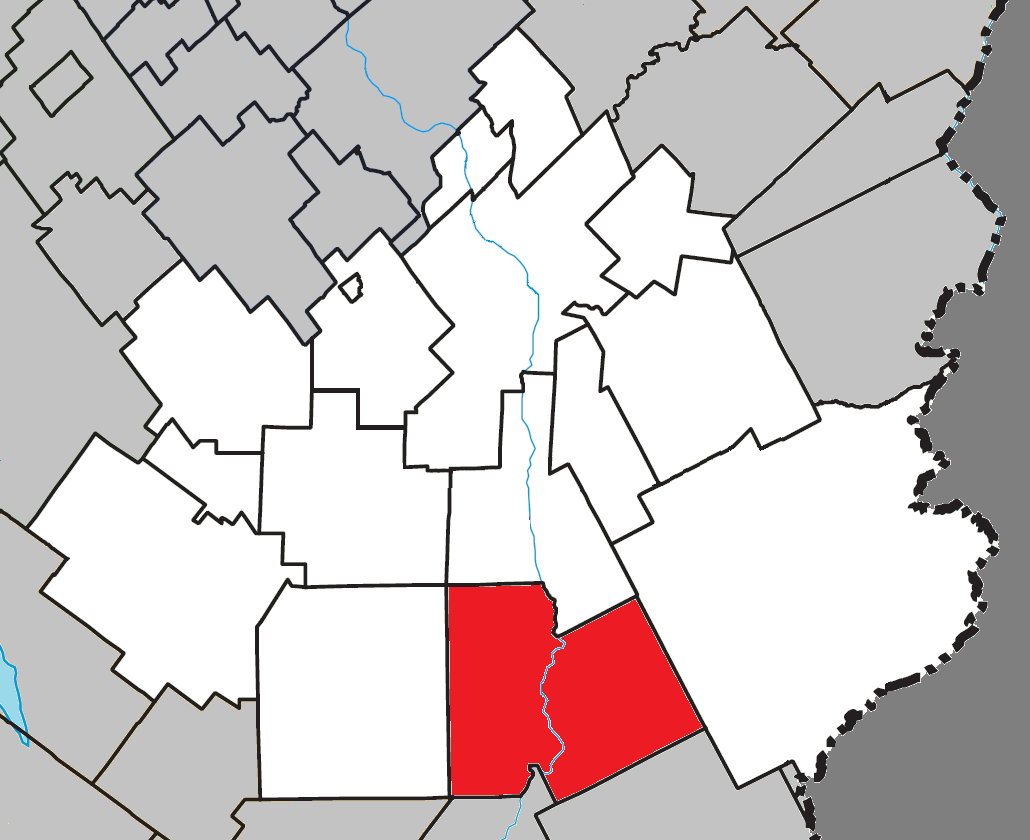
- Location within Beauce-Sartigan RCM.

- Location in southern Quebec.
- Coordinates: 45°51′N 70°38′W
- Country: Canada
- Province: Quebec
- Region: Chaudière-Appalaches
- RCM: Beauce-Sartigan
- Constituted: February 12, 2003
- Named for: Gideon and Beauce

Government
  - Mayor: Jean-Philippe Mercier
  - Federal riding: Beauce
  - Prov. riding: Beauce-Sud

Area
  - Municipality: 200.00 km^{2} (77.22 sq mi)
  - Land: 197.37 km^{2} (76.20 sq mi)

Population (2021)
  - Municipality: 2,093
  - Density: 10.6/km^{2} (27/sq mi)
  - Urban: 1,439
  - Pop 2016-2021: ▼5.1%
  - Dwellings: 956
- Time zone: UTC−5 (EST)
  - Summer (DST): UTC−4 (EDT)
- Postal code(s): G0M 1T0
- Area codes: 418 and 581
- Highways: R-204; R-269
- Website: www.st-gedeon- de-beauce.qc.ca

Saint-Gédéon-de-Beauce (French pronunciation: [sɛ̃ ʒedeɔ̃ də bos], lit. 'Saint Gédéon of Beauce') is a municipality in the Beauce-Sartigan Regional County Municipality in Quebec, Canada. It is part of the Chaudière-Appalaches region, and its population was 2,093 as of 2021. It is named after biblical judge Gideon.

The municipality was created in February 2003 after the merging of the parish municipality of Saint-Gédéon and the municipality of Saint-Gédéon-de-Beauce. The two had split in 1950.

Saint-Gédéon-de-Beauce is a site of Canam, one of the largest steel joist factories in Canada.

== Geography ==
Saint-Gédéon-de-Beauce is the only municipality whose territory straddles the Chaudière River that does not have a bridge across it.

== Demographics ==
=== Population ===
Canada census – Saint-Gédéon-de-Beauce community profile

	2021	2016	2011
Population	2,093 (-5.1% from 2016)	2,205 (-3.2% from 2011)	2,277 (-3.1% from 2006)
Land area	197.37 km^{2} (76.20 sq mi)	197.52 km^{2} (76.26 sq mi)	196.99 km^{2} (76.06 sq mi)
Population density	10.6/km^{2} (27/sq mi)	11.2/km^{2} (29/sq mi)	11.6/km^{2} (30/sq mi)
Median age	44.8 (M: 43.6, F: 46)	43 (M: 43, F: 42.9)	41.2 (M: 41.4, F: 41.1)
Private dwellings	956 (total)	953 (total)	928 (total)
Median household income	$70,500	$58,368	$57,049

References: 2021 2016 2011

Historical Census Data - Saint-Gédéon-de-Beauce, Quebec

Year	Pop.	±%
1951	682	—
1956	857	+25.7%
1961	930	+8.5%
1966	1,030	+10.8%
1971	1,183	+14.9%

Year	Pop.	±%
1976	1,292	+9.2%
1981	1,569	+21.4%
1986	1,627	+3.7%
1991	1,707	+4.9%
1996	1,770	+3.7%

Year	Pop.	±%
2001	1,829	+3.3%
2006	2,351	+28.5%
2011	2,277	−3.1%
2016	2,205	−3.2%
2021	2,093	−5.1%

== Notable people ==
Novelist Jacques Poulin was born in Saint-Gédéon-de-Beauce.

Carnival king Alex Goulet was born in Saint-Gédéon-de-Beauce.
