= Diane Leblanc =

Canadian politician

Member of the National Assembly of Quebec for Beauce-Sud
- In office 1997–2007

Personal details
- Born: December 9, 1954 (age 71) Saint-Jean-sur-Richelieu, Quebec, Canada
- Party: Liberal
- Occupation: publicist, politician

Diane Leblanc (born 9 December 1954) is a publicist and politician in Quebec. She served as a member of the National Assembly of Quebec for the Quebec Liberal Party, representing Beauce-Sud from 1997 to 2007.

== Life and career ==
Leblanc was born in Saint-Jean-sur-Richelieu. She graduated from College of Saint - Laurent in 1975. She then studied management at Laval University and human resource management at University of Quebec at Trois-Rivières.

She served as a press and PR liaison for several politicians in Beauce-Sud before running for office. She won in the 1998 Quebec general election and the 2003 Quebec general election. From 2003 to 2007 she served as second Vice-President of the National Assembly of Quebec. She lost to Action démocratique du Québec candidate Claude Morin in the 2007 Quebec general election.

In 2007, Leblanc opened a consulting firm in public and government relations. In 2008, she did work for the National Democratic Institute in Morocco. In 2010, she was appointed as Vice-President of the Quebec Labour Standards Commission.
