= Saint-Georges City Council =

Saint-Georges City Council (in French: Le conseil municipal de Saint-Georges) is the governing body for the mayor–council government in the city of Saint-Georges, Quebec in the Chaudière-Appalaches region. The council consists of the mayor and eight councillors.

== Current Saint-Georges City Council ==
- Manon Bougie, mayor
- Brigitte Busque, District 1 councillor
- Tom Redmond, District 2 councillor
- Jérôme Gendreau, District 3 councillor
- Esther Fortin, District 4 councillor
- Denis Veilleux, District 5 councillor
- Jean-Pierre Fortier, District 6 councillor
- Olivier Duval, District 7 councillor
- Philippe Breton, District 8 councillor
