= Paul Busque =

Canadian politician

Member of the National Assembly of Quebec for Beauce-Sud
- In office November 9, 2015 – October 1, 2018
- Preceded by: Robert Dutil
- Succeeded by: Samuel Poulin

Personal details
- Political party: Liberal

Paul Busque is a Canadian politician, who was elected to the National Assembly of Quebec in a by-election on November 9, 2015. He represented the electoral district of Beauce-Sud as a member of the Quebec Liberal Party until his defeat in the 2018 election.
