= Mon pays le Québec =

- Party Leader: Claude Dupré
- Founded: November 20, 2012 (registered)
- Headquarters: Ste-Marcelline-de-Kildare, Quebec
- Ideology: Quebec sovereignty Green politics

Website
- Mon pays le Québec

Mon pays le Québec (French pronunciation: [mɔ̃ pei lə kebɛk], lit. 'Quebec, My Country') is a political party in the Canadian province of Quebec.

== Ideology ==
On the subject of immigration, the party created a multi-tiered path to citizenship. Those who can effectively read, write, and speak French will receive citizenship within three years, while other immigrants will have five years to comply with these language requirements or be deported.

The party espouses an ideology of Quebec sovereignty. Similar to Option nationale and the Parti Indépendantiste, the party feels that, if given a majority mandate in the National Assembly of Quebec, they would have a clear mandate to separate from Canada. Additionally, like most sovereigntist parties, the party has announced its support for the primacy of the French language in Quebec. Anglophones and Allophones who were born in Quebec will be considered citizens of a sovereign Quebec, though they will be subject to the same regulations as immigrants to the country. If the anglophone and allophone populations of Quebec do not learn French within five years of Quebec becoming a state, they will lose all rights within the country.

The party wishes to switch to an electronic voting system for both elections and referendums.

In terms of national economics and taxation, the party advocates switching to a FairTax, which would remove all income taxes, payroll taxes, gift taxes, and estate taxes and replace them with a consumption tax and an import tariff.

== Election results ==
In the 2014 Quebec election, the party fielded six candidates. In total, the party received 521 votes, with party leader Claude Dupré receiving 193 votes in the riding of Berthier

Election	# of candidates	# of votes	% of popular vote	# of seats
2014	6	521	0.01%	0

Candidate	Votes	%	Placement	District
Claude Dupré	193	0.51	7/7	Berthier
Jean Paquet	69	0.2	8/8	Beauce-Sud
Dany Brien	35	0.1	8/8	Maskinongé
Serge Dupré	51	0.17	7/7	Argenteuil
Léon Dupré	90	0.2	9/9	Vaudreuil
Denis Cadieux	83	0.21	8/8	Lotbinière-Frontenac
