= Manac (trailers) =

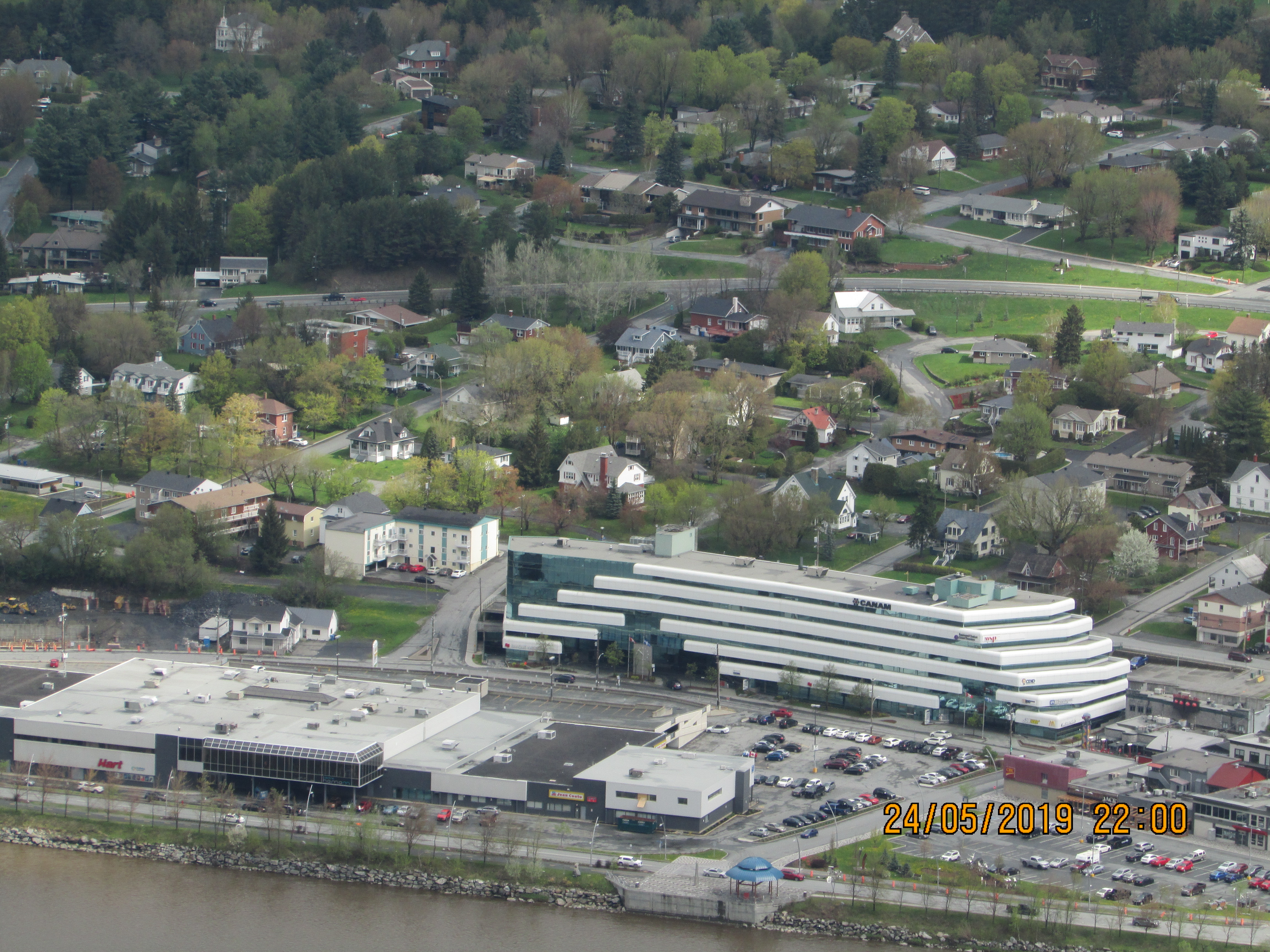
- Head office in Saint-Georges.
- Type: Private
- Industry: Transportation
- Founded: 1966
- Founder: Marcel Dutil
- Headquarters: Saint-Georges, Quebec, Canada
- Area served: North America
- Key people: Charles Dutil, President & CEO
- Products: Semi-trailers
- Number of employees: 1200
- Website: www.manac.com

Manac is a Canadian manufacturing company that primarily produces semi-trailers, with an emphasis on custom-built units. Manac is the biggest manufacturer of trailers in Canada and also produces custom-built trailers for North America. They are the 7th biggest manufacturer of semi-trailers in North America. Its headquarters are located in Saint-Georges, Quebec but it has several factories in Penticton, British Columbia and Oran, Missouri.

== History ==
The company was founded in 1966 as a way of supplying Canam Steel Works (now Canam Group). The shipping delay within the trailer industry in the sixties was well over 6 months, Dutil then decided that he would make his own trailers in an open garage within his factory in Saint-Gédéon and would make the finishing touches in the barn behind his home in Saint-Georges, Quebec. In October 1966 Marcel Dutil incorporates the Company. While producing trailers for Canam many small transporters within the region of Beauce, Quebec started noticing the speed at which the Manac trailers were being delivered and began putting in their orders. The production of Manac trailers within the first year were only flatbeds and Manac manufactured eleven units in its first year.

=== Chronology ===
- 1966: Manac is incorporated by its founder, Marcel Dutil, in Saint-Georges, Quebec.
- 1972: Manac acquires Canam Steel Works, the Canam Manac Group is born.
- 1974: Manac has its first sales and repair office in Boucherville, Quebec next to Canam’s metal deck factory.
- 1977: The first fibre-reinforced plastic (FRP) van made by Manac is put on the market.
- 1982: The first ever galvanized (galvanisation) van is born at Manac.
- 1986: Manac is behind competition and begins production of its first aluminum van.
- 1989: Manac begins its expansion towards a wide range of products and launches two brand new products to the market: side curtain flatbeds and steel walls chip vans.
- 1991: The first aluminum and steel (combo) flatbeds are produced at Manac.
- 1994: Manac sees an expansion opportunity in Orangeville, Ontario and purchases a 138,000-square-foot factory for its production of standard vans.
- 2000:
  - Manac launches a new product: The 100% aluminum flatbed.
  - Manac acquires the Canadian division of Kalyn-Siebert, which includes a 100,000-square-foot factory in Trois-Rivières, Quebec and the market brand Fabrex.
  - A new sales office and service center opens its doors in Mississauga, Ontario (now in Etobicoke, Ontario).
- 2002: Manac begins its expansion in the American market with the purchase of CPS Trailers Inc in Oran, Missouri.
- 2004:
  - The Canam Manac Group is broken up with the sale of Manac due to the fact that Canam wanted to focus on its steel operations.
  - Manac sees the day as a private company, the Dutil family remains important owners of the company.
- 2006: Manac celebrates 40 years of experience.
- 2008: Manac opens up its second factory in the United States with a location in Kennett, Missouri.
- 2009: Following the 2009 economic crisis Manac acquires the intellectual properties of Trailmobile Canada and a small number of its equipment.
- 2011: The intellectual property of Liddell Canada becomes Manac property.
- 2012: Manac is the only trailer manufacturer to pass all three tests by the IIHS when testing underride on rear guards.
- 2013: Manac becomes a public company and its shares are traded on the Toronto Stock Exchange.
- 2014: Manac sees an opportunity in western Canada and announces the acquisition of Peerless Limited from the McCoy Corporation, a manufacturer of highly specialized semi-trailers.
- 2015: After a short stint Manac removes itself from the Toronto Stock Exchange and comes back as a private company with the Dutil family remaining an important owner.
- 2016: Manac highlights its successes after 50 years.

== Brand Names ==
Manac products are sold under the brand names: Manac, CPS, Peerless, Darkwing, UltraPlate, Ultravan and Liddell Canada.

=== CPS ===
CPS Trailers was acquired by Manac in 2002. The brand name CPS Dump Trailer began in the 80s with the goal of helping the construction and agriculture industry with its need for specific semi-trailers. Manac uses its CPS brand in only the United States and produces its CPS units in its Oran, Missouri factory. CPS offers the following products:

- Grain Hoppers
- Half Round End-Dumps
- Demolition End-Dumps
- Lightweight End-Dumps
- Lightweight Bottom Dumps

=== Lidell Canada ===
In 2011 Manac made the acquisition of the intellectual properties of Liddell Canada who were under the property of Remorques Nordic, a Canadian competitor. Liddell is a division of low beds produced in Manac’s Saint-Georges plant. The Liddell brand differentiates itself from the company’s other low-beds in means of specialization and higher quality. Liddell offers 5 types of low-beds under two basic models: the A Series and the AP Model.

=== Peerless ===
Peerless is a company that was acquired in 2014. They manufacture highly specialized low beds, flatbeds and chassis. Manac made the acquisition of the brand Peerless with the goal of building a bigger presence in the oil, gas, forestry, and construction industries in western Canada. Peerless uses the brand name Scona in the United States. Its factory is located in Penticton, British Columbia. Peerless sells more than 100 types of trailers in the following sectors:

- Wind Energy
- Multi-Axle Heavy-Haul
- Heavy-Haul
- Oilfield
- Well Stimulation and intervention
- Oil and Gas, Driling and Well Servicing
- Crane Dolliies
- Forestry
- Power Generation –Transmission
- Mining Trailers

=== Trailmobile ===
In 2009, Manac made the acquisition of the intellectual properties of Trailmobile Canada and part of their equipment. Trailmobile Trailer LLC was originally a pioneer in the production of semi-trailer for over 100 years within the United States but went bankrupt in 2001; however their Canadian operations remained active until 2009. Manac uses the Trailmobile brand to sell their UltraPlate van since the Trailmobile brand is a better-known brand within the United States.
