= Parti 51 =

- Leader: Hans Mercier
- Spokesperson: Sonia Vachon
- Founded: August 11, 1989 (first incarnation); October 13, 2016 (second incarnation)
- Dissolved: December 13, 1990 (first incarnation); January 14, 2024 (second incarnation)
- Headquarters: 11505, 1re avenue Bureau 200; Saint-Georges, Quebec; G5Y 7X3
- Membership (2018): 1,100
- Ideology: Single issue: Accession of Quebec to the United States; Republican sovereignty; Post-colonialism

The Parti 51 (French: Parti cinquante et un, pronounced [paʁti sɛ̃kɑ̃t e œ̃]) was a Pro-American political party in the Canadian province of Quebec that was founded in the late 1980s under the leadership of Serge Talon. The party proposed the separation of Quebec from Canada in order to seek admission to the United States as the 51st state of the American union. The party had no success in winning any seat in the 1989 election to the National Assembly of Quebec, and in the spring of 1990, asked the Direction of Elections of Quebec to dissolve the party because it no longer had enough members to form an executive committee.

In 2016, the party was relaunched by a Saint-Georges-based lawyer, Hans Mercier. Becoming a state of the United States of America had been the primary purpose and goal of Parti 51 since its inception.

== History ==
Founded in August 1989, the party was led by Serge Talon throughout its first version.

The movement presented 11 candidates in the general election of 1989 but obtained only 3846 votes, or 0.11% of the province's vote and no deputy in the National Assembly of Quebec. The average percentage of votes obtained by their candidates compared to the eleven constituencies represents only 1.27%. The scores range from 0.66% (Vachon) to 1.98% (Orford). The party mainly targeted English-speaking constituencies, competing with the Unity Party in six constituencies.

In the spring of 1990, the organization requested its dissolution from the Chief Electoral Officer of Quebec (DGEQ), explaining that it no longer had enough members to form an executive council, it was enacted in 1991.

During the 1990s, legal scholar Claude Laferrière became one of the most prominent advocates of the Parti 51 cause. While not involved in the original founding, Laferrière contributed significantly to the movement's legal foundation. He framed Quebec’s accession to the United States as a lawful constitutional alternative grounded in international law, post-colonial self-determination, and republican sovereignty. His interpretation emphasized the incompatibility of Crown-based Canadian federalism with Quebec's democratic aspirations, proposing instead that U.S. statehood offered greater institutional guarantees for language, law, and liberty. Laferrière's writings and outreach helped transform the movement from a marginal political idea into a juridically structured proposition, particularly through the now-defunct Star51.org platform.

In 2016, Saint-Georges lawyer Hans Mercier re-launched Parti 51, again calling and campaigning for the annexation of Quebec for it to become an American state. By the time of the 2018 election, the party had an estimated 1,100 members. Mercier told La Presse that the times have changed since the party's previous era, as Quebec sovereigntism has waned in popularity. Mercier argued that Americans would be welcoming of a new Quebec state, and pointed to a survey taken during the administration of George W. Bush that suggested nearly 34% of Quebecers would support joining the United States. Of the various reasons and advantages argued by the party in favor of joining the United States of America, one prominent aspect has focused on economic grounds, as for instance by the early 2000s the mutual trade volume between Quebec and the US had surpassed that of Quebec and the remaining provinces of Canada combined, greater autonomy and sovereignty over its own affairs as a US state, access to the US common market, as well as national security and defence, as Quebec as a US state would have its own state National Guard and fall under the umbrella and protection afforded by the federal US Armed Forces.

Similar to the example of Quebec's Parti 51, additional secessionist movements and formal political parties have formed across other Canadian provinces likewise seeking statehood via admission into the United States, such as with Alberta separatism with the formation of Alberta 51. In order to appeal to as wide a base of support as possible, Parti 51 asserts it does not hold positions on any other issues aside from the immediate goal of seceding from Canada and acceding as a state to the US.

As of 2024, the party is no longer active, though there have been efforts to revive it.

== Election results ==
General election	# of candidates	# of elected candidates	% of popular vote
1989	11	0	0.11%
2018	5	0	0.03%
2022	5	0	0.02%

=== 1989 election results ===
In the 1989 Quebec general election, the most successful year for Parti 51, the party nominated 11 candidates, who won 3,846 votes, or 0.11% of the popular vote in the province. The party ran mostly in anglophone areas of the province.

Results of Party 51 candidates in 1989 National Assembly of Quebec elections
District	Candidate	Votes	Percentage
Vachon	Paul Ducharme	223	0.66%
Richmond	Michel Dostie	210	0.87%
Johnson	Yvan Lapointe	257	0.99%
Brome-Missisquoi	Jean-Guy Péloquin	269	1.08%
Sherbrooke	Yvon Rivet	315	1.11%
Anjou	Michel Gauthier	281	1.16%
Mégantic-Compton	Edmond Trudeau	245	1.17%
LaFontaine	Roger Wistaff	391	1.48%
Drummond	Diane Carrier	493	1.58%
Saint-François	France Bougie	568	1.97%
Orford	André Perron	594	1.98%

== See also ==
- List of political parties in Quebec
- Politics of Quebec
- Quebec sovereignty movement
- Republican Party of Alberta
- Unionest Party
- 51st state
- Republicanism in Canada
- Annexation movement (19th century Canada)
- French Canadians in the American Revolution
