= Saint-Georges, Quebec =

City in south-eastern Quebec, Canada

Saint-Georges
- City
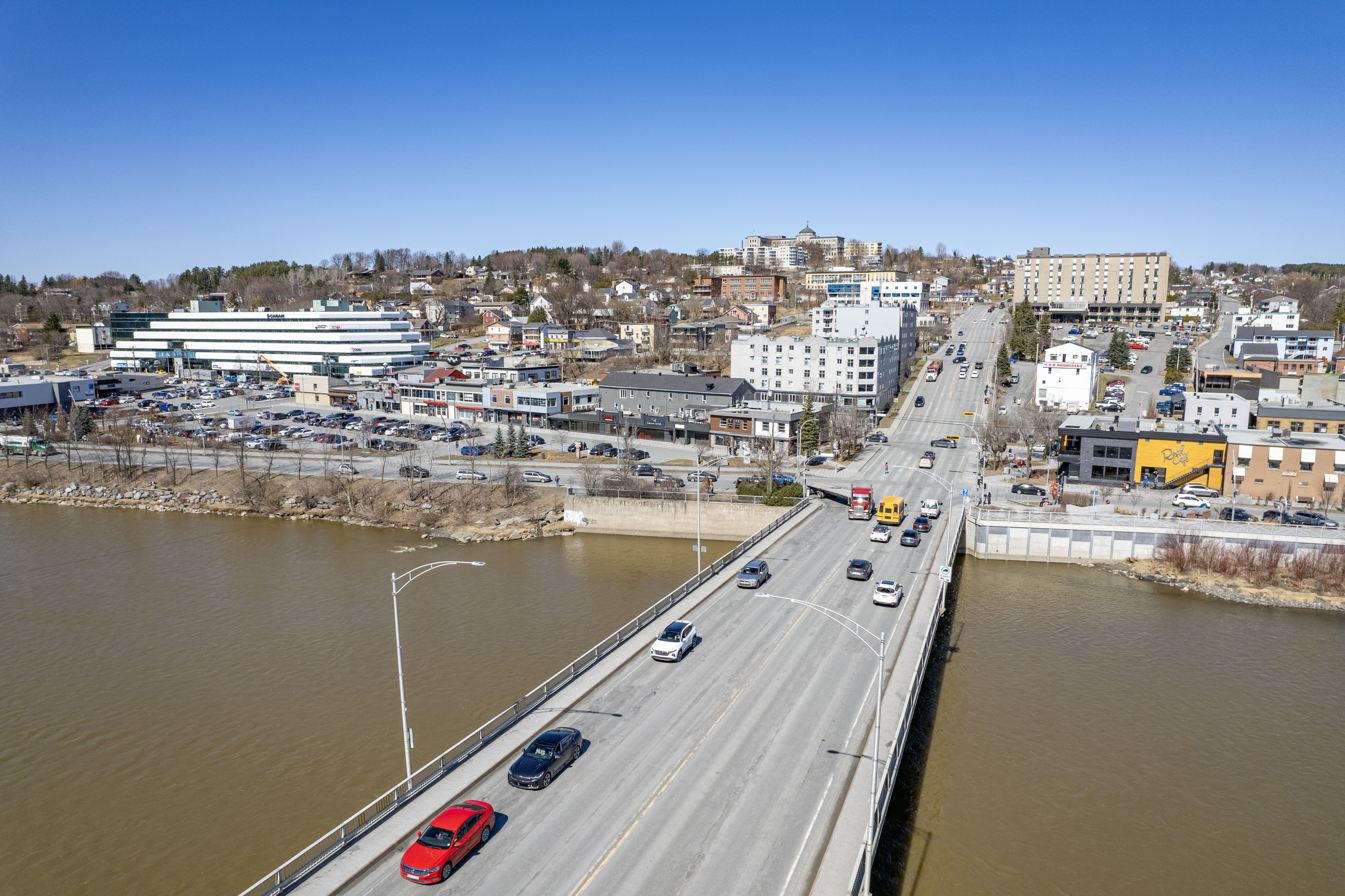
- A view of Saint-Georges, with the CEGEP at the top of the hill.

- Coat of arms
- Motto: Ensemble pour l'avenir (French for "Together for the future")
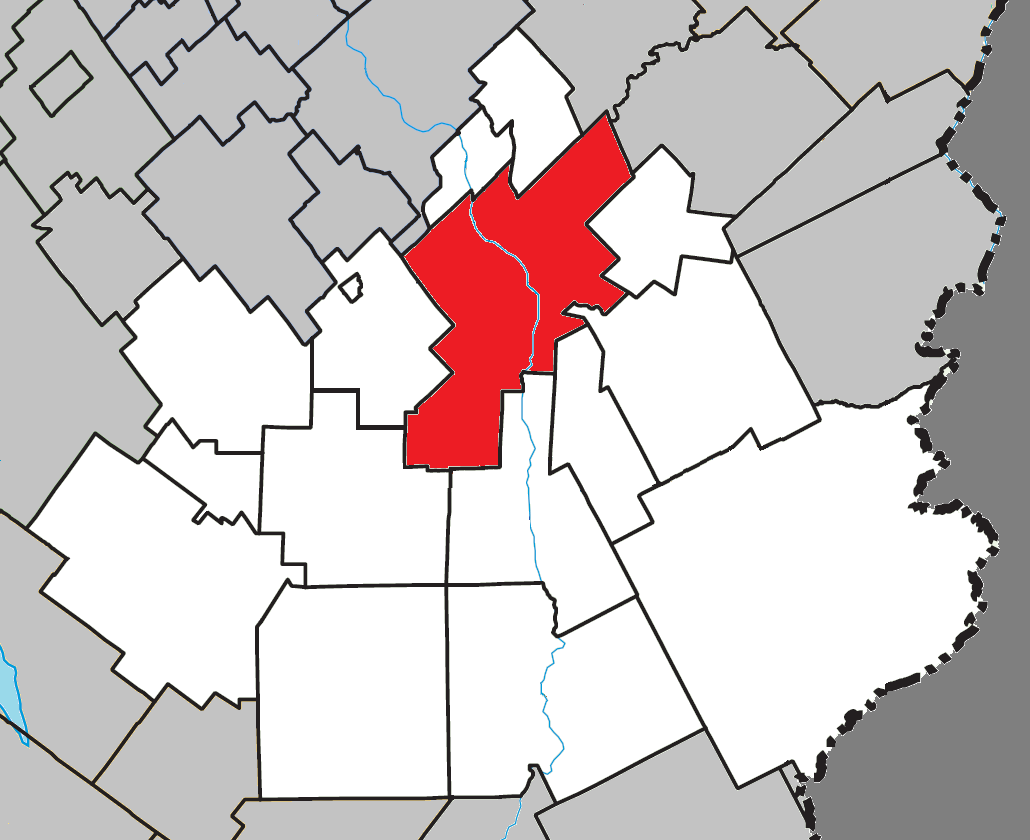
- Location within Beauce-Sartigan RCM.

- Location in southern Quebec.
- Coordinates: 46°07′N 70°40′W
- Country: Canada
- Province: Quebec
- Region: Chaudière-Appalaches
- RCM: Beauce-Sartigan
- Constituted: September 26, 2001

Government
  - Mayor: Manon Bougie
  - Governing Body: Saint-Georges City Council
  - MP: Jason Groleau (Beauce, Conservative)
  - MNA: Samuel Poulin (Beauce-Sud, CAQ)

Area
  - City: 202.40 km^{2} (78.15 sq mi)
  - Land: 199.08 km^{2} (76.87 sq mi)
  - Urban: 27.09 km^{2} (10.46 sq mi)
  - Metro: 355.62 km^{2} (137.31 sq mi)

Population (2021)
  - City: 32,935
  - Density: 165.4/km^{2} (428/sq mi)
  - Urban: 27,402
  - Urban density: 1,011.5/km^{2} (2,620/sq mi)
  - Metro: 34,833
  - Metro density: 95.4/km^{2} (247/sq mi)
  - Pop 2016–2021: ▲1.3%
  - Dwellings: 16,058
- Time zone: UTC−5 (EST)
  - Summer (DST): UTC−4 (EDT)
- Postal code(s): G5Y, G5Z, G6A
- Area codes: 418 and 581
- Highways A-73 A-10 (possible): R-173; R-204; R-271
- People: Georgiens, Georgiennes
- Website: www.ville. saint-georges.qc.ca

Saint-Georges (French pronunciation: [sɛ̃ ʒɔʁʒ]) is a city in the province of Quebec, Canada. It is the seat of Beauce-Sartigan Regional County Municipality, part of the Chaudière-Appalaches region. The population was 32,935 as of the Canada 2021 Census. Route 173 runs through Saint-Georges Est (where it is known as Boulevard Lacroix) and heads south to the border with Maine, United States.

The name of the parish and of the city, Saint-Georges, is in homage to George Pozer, the fourth seigneur of Aubert-Gallion.

The Beauce-Etchemin School Board (Commission scolaire de la Beauce-Etchemin) has its headquarters on 118th Street. Saint-Georges is home to the Cégep Beauce-Appalaches.

In 2002, it amalgamated with Saint-Georges-Est (pop. 4,110), Aubert-Gallion (pop. 2,444) and Saint-Jean-de-la-Lande (pop. 786).

It is home to one of the few inflatable dams, introduced to raise the water level of the Chaudière River for water-based activities and to make the riverside more attractive. Pedestrian bridges were also built over the river as part of the same project.

== History ==
The history of Saint-Georges goes back to the late seventeenth century, at which point the region was inhabited principally by the Algonquin people, also known as the Anishinaabe. The first European presence recorded is that of a Jesuit missionary called Father Gabriel Druillettes who made three visits in 1646, 1650, and finally in 1651, but there was no colonial settlement established at this time. By the middle of the next century, however, two colonial seigneuries had been established on the present site of Saint-Georges: these were Aubin-de-l'Isle and Aubert-Gallion. Records indicate that in 1760, one of them, Aubert-Gallion, passed into the hands of Marie-Anne Josephte de l'Estrigant de St-Martin and of her daughter Charlotte-Marie-Anne-Joseph Aubert de la Chesnaye. The two heiresses sold their inheritance in 1768 to William Grant, a Scotsman with ambitions to become a major Canadian landowner. Grant died in 1805 or 1807 (sources differ), and the estate was sold again, this time to the German (at least by birthplace) Johann Georg Pfotzer. The canonical parish of Saint-Georges was created in 1835, and the secular parish/municipality in 1856.

== Geography ==
Saint-Georges is located 85 km south of Quebec City, 125 km northeast of Sherbrooke and 40 km north of the state of Maine. The other towns of some importance in the vicinity, Lévis and Thetford Mines, are located respectively 80 km to the north and 50 km to the west of Saint-Georges. Saint-Georges shares its borders with Saint-Honoré-de-Shenley to the southwest, with Saint-Benoît-Labre to the west. Notre-Dame-des-Pins, Saint-Simon-les-Mines and Saint-Benjamin are the neighboring municipalities to the north. The border is shared with Saint-Prosper, Saint-Philibert, Saint-Côme–Linière while the southeast is shared with Saint-Martin and Saint-René.

Downtown Saint-Georges extends on both banks of the Chaudière River in the center of the territory; another urban core, the neighborhood of Saint-Jean-de-la-Lande is located southwest of downtown. Saint-Georges is located north of the Beauce-Sartigan Regional County Municipality in the administrative region of Chaudière-Appalaches. The three catholic parishes, L'Assomption-de-la-Bienheureuse-Vierge-Marie, Saint-Georges and Saint-Jean-de-la-Lande, are part of the Roman Catholic Archdiocese of Quebec. The city is part of the Beauce tourist sub-region, which is located in the Chaudière-Appalaches tourist region.

=== Climate ===
Climate data for Saint-Georges (1981−2010)
Month	Jan	Feb	Mar	Apr	May	Jun	Jul	Aug	Sep	Oct	Nov	Dec	Year
Record high °C (°F)	16.0 (60.8)	16.0 (60.8)	20.0 (68.0)	30.0 (86.0)	32.8 (91.0)	34.0 (93.2)	35.0 (95.0)	35.0 (95.0)	34.5 (94.1)	28.0 (82.4)	22.5 (72.5)	15.0 (59.0)	35.0 (95.0)
Mean daily maximum °C (°F)	−6.1 (21.0)	−3.6 (25.5)	2.1 (35.8)	10.3 (50.5)	18.0 (64.4)	22.9 (73.2)	25.1 (77.2)	24.1 (75.4)	19.4 (66.9)	11.9 (53.4)	4.5 (40.1)	−2.6 (27.3)	10.5 (50.9)
Daily mean °C (°F)	−12 (10)	−10 (14)	−4.2 (24.4)	4.2 (39.6)	11.1 (52.0)	16.3 (61.3)	18.8 (65.8)	17.8 (64.0)	13.2 (55.8)	6.6 (43.9)	0.2 (32.4)	−7.5 (18.5)	4.5 (40.1)
Mean daily minimum °C (°F)	−18.0 (−0.4)	−16.4 (2.5)	−10.4 (13.3)	−1.8 (28.8)	4.1 (39.4)	9.7 (49.5)	12.5 (54.5)	11.4 (52.5)	7.0 (44.6)	1.2 (34.2)	−4.1 (24.6)	−12.4 (9.7)	−1.4 (29.5)
Record low °C (°F)	−41.0 (−41.8)	−41.7 (−43.1)	−37.0 (−34.6)	−19.4 (−2.9)	−7.8 (18.0)	−2.8 (27.0)	0.0 (32.0)	−2.2 (28.0)	−8.0 (17.6)	−10.6 (12.9)	−28.0 (−18.4)	−39.0 (−38.2)	−41.7 (−43.1)
Average precipitation mm (inches)	66.6 (2.62)	47.0 (1.85)	55.1 (2.17)	76.1 (3.00)	89.4 (3.52)	111.6 (4.39)	114.1 (4.49)	123.2 (4.85)	89.2 (3.51)	95.3 (3.75)	81.2 (3.20)	80.9 (3.19)	1,029.7 (40.54)
Average rainfall mm (inches)	18.4 (0.72)	11.4 (0.45)	24.7 (0.97)	65.8 (2.59)	89.2 (3.51)	111.6 (4.39)	114.1 (4.49)	123.2 (4.85)	89.2 (3.51)	92.9 (3.66)	62.3 (2.45)	25.9 (1.02)	828.7 (32.63)
Average snowfall cm (inches)	48.2 (19.0)	35.6 (14.0)	30.4 (12.0)	10.4 (4.1)	0.0 (0.0)	0.0 (0.0)	0.0 (0.0)	0.0 (0.0)	0.0 (0.0)	2.5 (1.0)	18.9 (7.4)	55.0 (21.7)	201.0 (79.1)
Average precipitation days (≥ 0.2 mm)	12.9	9.5	9.6	11.9	13.5	14.0	13.6	12.9	11.8	12.9	14.0	14.0	150.6
Average rainy days (≥ 0.2 mm)	2.5	1.9	4.5	10.5	13.5	14.0	13.6	12.9	11.8	12.7	9.6	3.9	111.4
Average snowy days (≥ 0.2 cm)	11.1	7.9	6.0	2.2	0.0	0.0	0.0	0.0	0.0	0.57	5.4	11.3	44.4
Source: Environment Canada

== Demographics ==
In the 2021 Census of Population conducted by Statistics Canada, Saint-Georges had a population of 32,935 living in 15,415 of its 16,058 total private dwellings, a change of 1.3% from its 2016 population of 32,513. With a land area of 199.08 km^{2} (76.87 sq mi), it had a population density of 165.4/km^{2} (428.5/sq mi) in 2021.

Population trend:

- Population in 2021: 32,935 (2016 to 2021 population change: 1.3%)
- Population in 2016: 32,513
- Population in 2011: 31,173
- Population in 2006: 29,616
- Population in 2001: 20,787
- Population in 1996: 20,057
- Population in 1991: 19,583
- Population in 1986: 11,723
- Population in 1981: 10,342
- Population in 1976: 8,605
- Population in 1971: 7,554
- Population in 1966: 6,680
- Population in 1961: 4,082
- Population in 1956: 3,197
- Population in 1951: 2,657
- Population in 1941: 1,945
- Population in 1931: 1,543
- Population in 1921: 1,058
- Population in 1911: 1,410

Mother Tongue:

- English: 0.9%
- French: 96.7%
- English and French: 0.4%
- Other only: 1.7%

In the 2021 Canadian Census, Saint-Georges was 96% white, 1.4% Aboriginal, and 2.6% visible minority.

== Economy ==
Although a relatively small city, Saint-Georges is often considered the Metropolis of Beauce Region because it's the largest city in the region. Saint-Georges is an important manufacturing centre, including textiles, steel forgings, garage doors, bicycles and truck trailers. The town is home to the headquarters of the Canam Group, a construction company, and Manac (trailers), the biggest semi-trailer manufacturer in Canada. Both these companies are under operation of the Dutil family. The city has a wide array of local and national retailers and restaurants, as well as many services including financial institutions, schools of different levels, medical clinics, a hospital and several others that are not found elsewhere in the region. Carrefour Saint-Georges is the largest shopping mall in town and in the region.

Saint-Georges is the headquarters of the intercity bus company Autocars La Chaudière, which provides bus services in the Beauce Region to Quebec City. The city also has a regional airport. The extension of Autoroute 73 from Beauceville, Quebec, approximately 11 kilometres (7 mi) to the north, to Saint-Georges was discussed for almost thirty years before finally being completed in 2016.

== Government ==
City council (as of 2025):

- Mayor: Manon Bougie
- Councillors: Brigitte Busque, Tom Redmond, Jérôme Gendreau, Esther Fortin, Denis Veilleux, Jean-Pierre Fortier, Olivier Duval, Philippe Breton

== Sister cities ==
- Lisieux, France since 1996

== Notable people ==
- Maxime Bernier
- Amélie Veille
- Joshua Roy
- Jesse Bélanger

== See also ==
- Beauce, Quebec
