= Stuart baronets =

Extinct baronetcy in the Baronetage of the United Kingdom

There have been three baronetcies created for persons with the surname Stuart, one in the Baronetage of Nova Scotia, one in the Baronetage of England and one in the Baronetage of the United Kingdom. Two of the creations are extant as of 2008.

The Stuart, later Crichton-Stuart Baronetcy, of Bute, was created in the Baronetage of Nova Scotia on 28 March 1627. For more information on this creation, see the Marquess of Bute.

The Steward, later Stuart Baronetcy, of Hartley Mauduit in the County of Southampton, was created in the Baronetage of England on 27 June 1660 for Nicholas Steward, Chamberlain of the Exchequer and Member of Parliament for Lymington. The second Baronet, grandson of the first, was also Chamberlain of the Exchequer and represented Southampton and Hampshire in the House of Commons. He changed the spelling of the family surname from Steward to Stuart. The third Baronet also sat as Member of Parliament for Hampshire. In 1829, on the death of his grandfather John Luttrell-Olmius, 3rd Earl of Carhampton (on whose death the earldom became extinct; see Earl of Carhampton), the fifth Baronet was offered a fresh patent of the earldom by King George IV. However, the offer was declined. The presumed eighth and ninth Baronets never successfully proved their succession to the title and were never on the Official Roll of the Baronetage, with the baronetcy considered dormant since 1939. In 2026 the tenth Baronet proved his succession to the title and was entered on the Official Roll of the Baronetage.

The Stuart Baronetcy, of Oxford in the County of Oxford, was created in the Baronetage of the United Kingdom on 5 May 1841 for the lawyer, judge and politician James Stuart. The title became extinct on the death of the fourth Baronet in 1915. Andrew Stuart, brother of the first Baronet, was a lawyer and politician. His son, Andrew Stuart, was a lawyer, judge, seigneur and businessman. George Okill Stuart, another brother of the first Baronet, was a clergyman. His son, George Okill Stuart, Jr., was a lawyer, judge and political figure.

== Stuart, later Crichton-Stuart baronets, of Bute (1627) ==
- Sir James Stuart, 1st Baronet (d. 1662)
- Sir Dugald Stuart, 2nd Baronet (d. 1670)
- Sir James Stuart, 3rd Baronet, (created Earl of Bute in 1703)

== Stuart Baronets, of Hartley Mauduit (1660) ==
- Sir Nicholas Steward, 1st Baronet (1618–1710)
- Sir Simeon Stuart, 2nd Baronet (1685–1761)
- Sir Simeon Stuart, 3rd Baronet (died 1779)
- Sir Simeon Stuart, 4th Baronet (died 1816)
- Sir Simeon Henry Stuart, 5th Baronet (1790–1868)
- Sir Simeon Henry Stuart, 6th Baronet (1823–1891)
- Sir Simeon Henry Lechmere Stuart, 7th Baronet (1864–1939)
- Houlton John Stuart, presumed 8th Baronet (1863–1959)
- Phillip Luttrell Stuart, presumed 9th Baronet (1937–2016)
- Sir Geoffrey Phillip Stuart, 10th Baronet (born 1973)

== Stuart baronets, of Oxford (1841) ==
- Sir James Stuart, 1st Baronet (1789–1853)
- Sir Charles James Stuart, 2nd Baronet (1824–1901)
- Sir Edward Andrew Stuart, 3rd Baronet (1832–1903)
- Sir James Stuart, 4th Baronet (1837–1915)

== See also ==
- Earl of Carhampton
- Stewart baronets
- Steuart baronets
- Stuart-Menteth baronets
- Forbes baronets
- Stuart-Taylor baronets
