= Okill =

Okill is a given name and surname. Notable people with the name include:

- George Okill Stuart (1776–1862), Anglican clergyman and educator
- George Okill Stuart Jr. (1807–1884), Canadian lawyer, political figure, and judge, son of George Okill Stuart
- John Okill (c. 1687–1773), English shipbuilder
- Okill Massey Learmonth (1894–1917), Canadian soldier
