= Civil Code of Quebec =

Provincial civil code

National Assembly of Quebec
- Citation: CQLR c. CCQ-1991
- Royal assent: 8 December 1991
- Commenced: 1 January 1994

Legislative history
- Bill citation: Bill 125 (34th Legislature, 1st session)
- Introduced by: Gil Rémillard, Minister of Justice
- First reading: 18 December 1990
- Second reading: 4 June 1991
- Third reading: 8 December 1991

Repeals
- Civil Code of Lower Canada

Related legislation
- An Act respecting the implementation of the reform of the Civil Code (SQ 1992, c. 57)

The Civil Code of Quebec (CCQ; French: Code civil du Québec, pronounced [kɔd sivil dy kebɛk]) is the civil code in force in the Canadian province of Quebec, which came into effect on January 1, 1994. It replaced the Civil Code of Lower Canada (French: Code civil du Bas-Canada) enacted by the Legislative Assembly of the Province of Canada in 1865, which had been in force since August 1, 1866.

The Civil Code of Quebec governs a number of areas affecting relations between individuals under Quebec law. It deals with the main rules governing the law of persons, the family, succession, property and civil liability. It also contains rules of evidence in civil matters and Quebec private international law.

== Scope ==
As summarized in its preliminary provision, the Civil Code of Quebec is a codification of the basic principles of laws, or jus commune, applicable to all people and property in Quebec and their respective relationships to each other. The Code, with some limited statutory exceptions, stands alongside the Quebec Charter of Human Rights and Freedoms as the foundation of all other laws in the province.

As the cornerstone of Quebec's legal system, the Civil Code is frequently amended in order to keep in step with the demands of modern society.

=== Layout and significant changes ===
The Civil Code of Quebec comprises over 3,000 articles and is structured into major divisions and subdivisions called books, titles, chapters and subsections. The Code is made up of ten books:

1. Persons
2. The Family
3. Successions
4. Property
5. Obligations
6. Prior Claims and Hypothecs
7. Evidence
8. Prescription
9. Publication of Rights
10. Private International Law

Articles of the code are numbered in sequential order (1, 2, 3...) across all books, going up to Article 3168. Articles inserted in-between are numbered with a decimal (1, 1.1, 2, 3...). Articles with multiple paragraphs do not have the paragraphs individually numbered.

The Code restatement of the civil law in Quebec as of the date of its adoption, including judicial interpretation of codal provisions, that included several significant changes from the former Code:

- broad privacy and personality rights protection,
- the adoption of rules on patrimonies by appropriation (analogous to, but conceptually different from, the law of trusts in common law jurisdictions),
- the introduction of a requirement for parties to conduct themselves in good faith
- the ability to create unincorporated associations with the ability to sue and be sued
- the ability to create hypothecs on movable property
- the introduction of a central register for personal and movable real rights
- the codification of the rules relating to private international law

== History ==
=== Adoption of the Civil Code of Lower Canada ===
The substantive law of the 1866 Civil Code of Lower Canada was derived primarily from the judicial interpretations of the law that had been in force to that date in Lower Canada. The work of the Commission on codification was also inspired by some of the modernizations found in the 1804 Napoleonic Code. At the time of Canadian Confederation, the Civil Code of Lower Canada replaced most of the laws inherited from the Custom of Paris and incorporated some English law as it had been applied in Lower Canada such as the English law of trusts. The former Civil Code was also inspired by the Louisiana Civil Code, the Field Code movement in New York, and the Civil Code of the Canton of Vaud (1819).

=== Revision process (1955–1991) ===
In 1955, the Government of Quebec embarked on a reform of the Civil Code. The Civil Code Revision Office was established, headed by Thibaudeau Rinfret, a former Chief Justice of Canada. In 1960, the role of the Office was expanded to include the appointment of four codifiers to work on a definitive draft for the new Code.

In 1961, Rinfret stepped down from the Office, and was replaced by André Nadeau who served until his appointment to the Superior Court of Quebec in 1964. Paul-André Crépeau was subsequently appointed to head the Office, where he served until 1977.

The reform process that led to the replacement of the Civil Code of Lower Canada by the Civil Code of Quebec was one of the largest legislative recodification undertakings in any civil law jurisdiction. The Office produced reports, held consultations, and presented a Draft Civil Code with commentaries to the Quebec National Assembly on 15 August 1977. After further consultations during the 1980s, portions of the Book on the Law of the Family were adopted. The consultation process continued through to the early 1990s.

=== Implementation (1991–1994) ===
The bill to enact the new Code was introduced into the National Assembly of Quebec on 18 December 1990 by Gil Rémillard, who was then Quebec's Minister of Justice. It received royal assent on 8 December 1991. It did not come into force until 1 January 1994, as the necessary legislation to provide transitional rules determining what matters would be subject to the new Code was not passed until 1992.

=== Harmonization with federal law ===
The Government of Canada has been undertaking a review of all federal laws that deal with private law to ensure that they take into consideration the terminology, concepts and institutions of Quebec civil law. In that regard, the following Acts have been passed:

- Income Tax Amendments Act, 2000
- Federal Law—Civil Law Harmonization Act, No. 1
- Federal Law—Civil Law Harmonization Act, No. 2
- Federal Law—Civil Law Harmonization Act, No. 3

As part of the first Harmonization Act, the Federal Law and Civil Law of the Province of Quebec Act was passed, which came into effect on 1 June 2001, which:

- repealed the provisions of the CCLC relating to areas under federal jurisdiction (insofar as they had not been already displaced by other federal Acts)
- standardized the rules relating to marriage that are to apply in Quebec as though they formed part of the Civil Code

It is estimated that, as of 2011, the federal harmonization project was 46% complete.
