= Civil Code of Lower Canada =

Codification of the civil law of the province of Lower Canada

Code civil du Bas-Canada
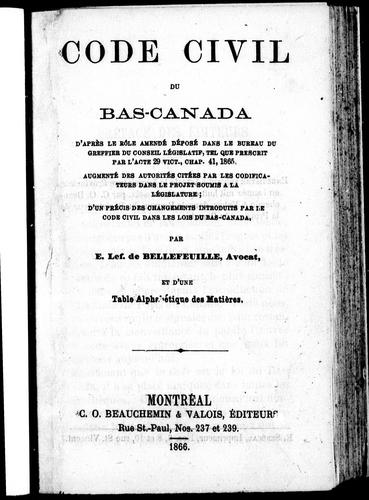
- Cover page from an 1866 edition of the Code

Parliament of the Province of Canada
- Citation: 29 Vict., ch. 41, (1865)
- Territorial extent: Lower Canada (Quebec from 1 July 1867)
- Royal assent: 18 September 1865
- Commenced: 1 August 1866
- Repealed: 1 January 1994 (provincial); 1 June 2001 (federal)
- Status: Repealed

The Civil Code of Lower Canada (French: Code civil du Bas-Canada) was a law that was in effect in Lower Canada on 1 August 1866 and remained in effect in Quebec until repealed and replaced by the Civil Code of Quebec on 1 January 1994. The Code replaced a mixture of French law and English law that had arisen in Lower Canada since the creation of the British Province of Quebec by the Royal Proclamation of 1763, as modified by the Quebec Act in 1774.

== Before the Code ==
=== French colonial era ===
From 1608 to 1664, the first colonists of New France followed the customary law (French: coutume) in effect for their province of origin in France. In 1664, the King of France decreed in Article 33 of the decree establishing the French West India Company (French: l'Édit d'établissement de la compagnie des Indes occidentales) that the Custom of Paris would serve as the main source of law throughout New France. Later, authorities went on to add le droit français de la métropole, that is, French law. This included royal decrees and ordinances (ordonnances royales), canon law relating to marriages, and Roman law relating to obligations, e.g., contracts and torts. Also in force were the ordinances issued by Royal Intendants (ordonnances des intendants) and the orders and judgments handed down by the Conseil supérieur.

The Royal Intendant was responsible for administering justice in the colony, and lawyers were barred from practicing in the colony. Most disputes were resolved by local notaries or local parish priests through arbitration in a manner much as had been done in ancient Rome. While the reliance on feudal French law meant that New France was divided into fiefs (seigneuries), the manorial lords (or seigneurs) were not entitled to the same judicial discretion in New France as they had in France; as it was, all criminal jurisdiction went to the Intendant. Therefore, while the Custom of Paris was the law of New France, there were few resources available for colonists to actually enforce that law.

=== Under the British Empire ===
Following France's relinquishment of Canada in favour of Guadeloupe in the Treaty of Paris, Canada came under British law. However, the seigneurial system of land tenure continued to be applied uniformly throughout the province. In 1774, as a result of a ruling by the British courts in Campbell v Hall about the status of legal systems found in acquired territories, the British Parliament passed the Quebec Act, which preserved French civil law for private law while keeping and reserving English common law for public law, including criminal prosecution. As a result, modern-day Quebec is one of a handful of jurisdictions in the world where two legal systems co-exist.

The Quebec Act was opposed by the English minority who believed that British citizens should be governed by English law. The Constitutional Act of 1791 resolved the dispute through the creation of Upper Canada west of the Ottawa River (subject to English common law) and Lower Canada around the St. Lawrence River (where civil law was maintained).

=== The need for codification ===
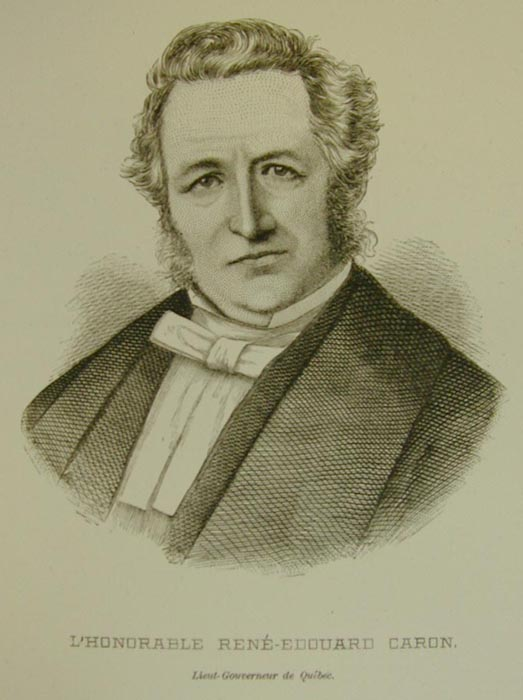
René-Édouard Caron

The practice of civil law in Lower Canada became quite complex by the middle of the 19th century, because of the multiple sources of law that needed to be drawn upon — most only available in French. As identified by René-Édouard Caron, the "law of the land" included:

1. the Custom of Paris as it was in 1663
2. during 1663–1759, edicts and ordinances of the French Crown that applied to Canada (Note: Ordinance of Saint-Germain-en-Laye of 1667; Criminal Ordinance of 1670; Trade Ordinance of 1673 ("Savary Code"); Navy Ordinance of 1681 ("Navy Code"); Code Noir of 1685)
3. during 1663–1759, ordinances of the Conseil supérieur
4. laws, edicts and ordinances issued by the French Crown for France that were registered with the Conseil supérieur
5. statutes of the British Parliament passed since the Conquest for Canada, or which specifically named Canada
6. during 1759–1764, laws passed by the British military government prior to the Treaty of Paris
7. during 1764–1791, laws passed by the Legislative Council of Quebec
8. Provincial Statutes of Lower Canada, 1791–1840
9. Ordinances of the Special Council of Lower Canada, 1838–1841
10. from 1840, Acts passed by the Parliament of the Province of Canada applicable to Lower Canada
11. English criminal laws as they existed at the passage of the Quebec Act 1774 as amended
12. for matters not treated in the above categories:

- pre-revolutionary French legal writers, such as Robert Joseph Pothier, Jean Domat, and Angers
- Canadian legal writers, such as Doucet, Crémazie, Louis-Hippolyte LaFontaine, and Bonner
- case law incorporating French case law and judgments published in Canadian law reports
- English public law applicable throughout the British Empire affecting the rights of British subjects

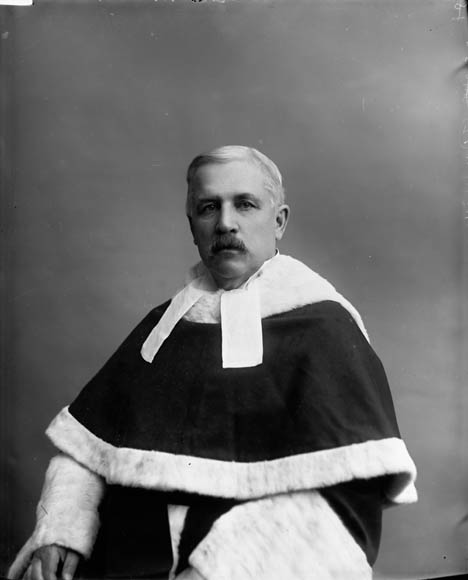
Désiré Girouard

In 1859, Désiré Girouard (later a judge of the Supreme Court of Canada) noted:

There is nothing more uncertain than the actual law of Lower Canada, nothing more confused than the state of Canadian law.

== Creation ==
In 1857, the Parliament of the Province of Canada passed An Act respecting the Codification of the Laws of Lower Canada relative to Civil matters and Procedure, to authorize the codification of the civil law then currently in force in Lower Canada. The Act's preamble declared:

WHEREAS the laws of Lower Canada in Civil Matters are mainly those which, at the time of the cession of the country to the British Crown, were in force in that part of France then governed by the Custom of Paris, modified by the Provincial Statutes, or by the introduction of portions of the Law of England in peculiar cases; and it therefore happens, that the great body of the Laws; in that division of the Province, exist only in a language which is not the mother tongue of the inhabitants thereof of British origin, while other portions are not to be found in the mother tongue of those of French origin and whereas the laws and Customs in force in France, at the period above mentioned, have there been altered and reduced to one general Code, so that the old laws still in force in Lower Canada are no longer reprinted or commented upon in France, and it is becoming more and more difficult to obtain copies of them, or of the commentaries upon them; And whereas the reasons aforesaid, and the great advantages which have resulted from Codification, as well in France as in the State of Louisiana, and other places, render it manifestly expedient to provide for the Codification of the Civil Laws of Lower Canada:

The Act authorized the creation of a codification commission, which consisted of three commissioners and two secretaries, all drawn from the Bar of Lower Canada.

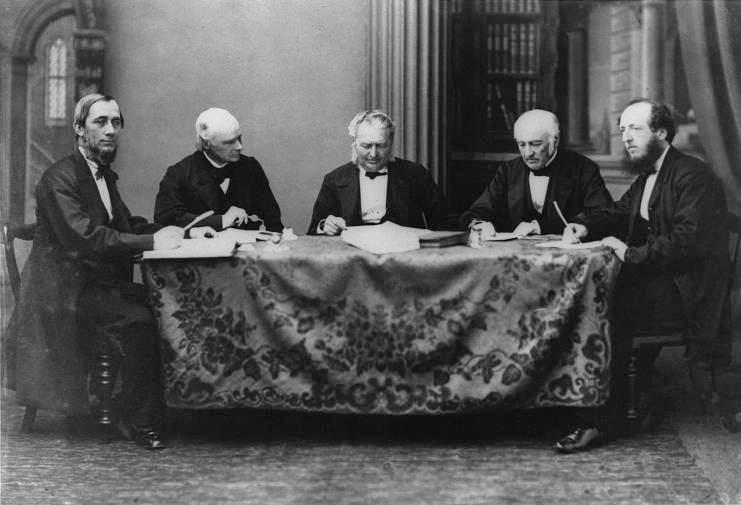
A meeting of the codification commission around 1865. From left to right: Joseph-Ubalde Beaudry, Charles Dewey Day, René-Édouard Caron, Augustin-Norbert Morin, Thomas McCord.

Members of the codification commission
Name	Position	Appointed
René-Édouard Caron	Judge of the Court of Queen's Bench at Quebec	Commissioner, 4 February 1859
Charles Dewey Day	Judge of the Superior Court at Montreal	Commissioner, 4 February 1859
Augustin-Norbert Morin	Judge of the Superior Court at Quebec	Commissioner, 4 February 1859
Joseph-Ubalde Beaudry	Clerk of the Court of Appeal	Secretary, 10 February 1859; Commissioner, 7 August 1865, replacing Morin
Thomas Kennedy Ramsay	Advocate at Montreal	Secretary, 10 February 1859
Thomas McCord	Advocate at Montreal	Secretary, 19 November 1862, replacing Ramsay
Louis-Siméon Morin	Advocate at Montreal, former solicitor general of Lower Canada	Secretary, 7 August 1865, replacing Beaudry

The Act authorizing the Code's adoption received royal assent on 18 September 1865, and it was proclaimed in force on 1 August 1866.

The commission was also charged with the codification of the laws of civil procedure, and the Act authorizing the adoption of the Code of Civil Procedure of Lower Canada received royal assent on 15 August 1866, and came into force on 28 June 1867.

The Code was generally greeted with satisfaction. As Thomas McCord noted in his 1867 edition of the Code:

The English speaking residents of Lower Canada may now enjoy the satisfaction of at last possessing in their own language the laws by which they are governed, and the Province of Quebec will bring with her into the Confederation a system of laws of which she may justly be proud.

== Layout ==
The Code consisted of four books:

- Book First – Of Persons (consisting of eleven titles)
- Book Second – Of Property, Of Ownership, and of its different modifications (consisting of five titles)
- Book Third – Of the Acquisition and Exercise of rights of property (consisting of twenty titles)
- Book Fourth – Commercial Law (consisting of six titles)

The provisions of the Code were drawn from several sources, including:

- the Napoleonic Code of 1804
- the Louisiana Civil Code of 1825
- the writings of Robert Joseph Pothier on pre-revolutionary French jurisprudence
- writings of contemporary commentators regarding the Napoleonic Code
- the Field Code movement in New York
- the Civil Code of the Canton de Vaud of 1819

The codification resulted in many parts of the French civil law being available in English for the first time. As Thomas McCord related later:

The conversion into English, of those titles, especially, which are derived from the old French law, was not unattended with difficulties, and to overcome these the terms of the Scotch law were in many instances made use of.

== Innovation ==
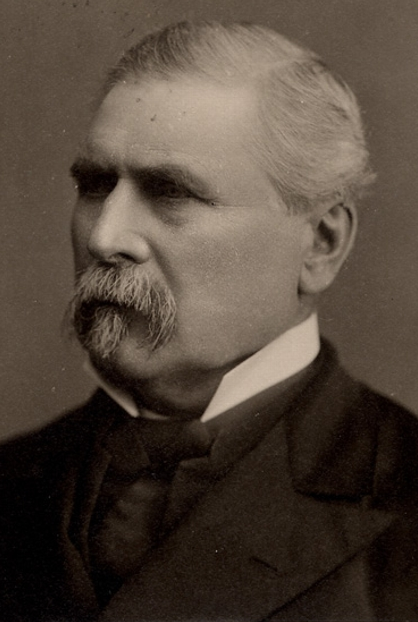
Thomas-Jean-Jacques Loranger

While the 1804 French Civil Code's framework was used in drafting the CCLC, the commissioners had to adapt its provisions to conform to the legal situation in Lower Canada by:

- deleting those provisions that were "new" law and thus not in force in Lower Canada
- adding to the Code those laws particular to Lower Canada

In addition, they proposed 217 resolutions for changes to the law, which were accepted by the Legislature with only minor modifications. As Thomas-Jean-Jacques Loranger observed in his 1873 work, Commentaire sur le Code Civil du Bas-Canada:

Four main objects stand out in the new legislation, reflect its spirit and summarize its general design.

The drafters of the Code have based their reforms upon four fundamental principles which are the very foundation of their work. These principles are:

1. Unlimited liberty of contracting, within the bounds of morality and public order, and, as sanction, the irrevocability of contracts except in accordance with the stipulations of the original agreement; the absolute right of the owner to deal with moveable property, the conveyance of immoveable property and the perfecting of the contract by consent alone.
2. The introduction of uniformity into the law by the coordination of its different branches; the application of the same principle to analogous cases, a strict deduction of principles in cases where the law is silent or contradictory, and the substitution of an absolute legislation for an arbitrary one; in other words, the substitution of a positive jurisdiction for the discretionary power of the Courts.
3. The simplifying of the rules which give rise to rights created by law, and which govern the legal transmission of property in the absence of any formal disposition thereof, the forms of contracts, and the creation as well as the exercise of legal rights.
4. Finally, provision for giving publicity to charges which, if concealed, might cause prejudice both to third persons and to the contracting parties.

Each of the amendments which we have enumerated will be found to fall, by a natural affinity, into one of these four classes.

There were significant reforms to the previous French law:

- mutual assent alone was now sufficient to convey title without delivery (which also was extended to cover sales and gifts)
- lesion (i.e. injury from another's failure to perform a contract) was abolished as grounds for voiding contracts between adults
- in contractual obligations, any stipulation of a fixed and certain sum to be paid as damages would no longer be liable to modification by the courts

Unlike the 1804 French Civil Code, with its revolutionary ideals, the Civil Code of Lower Canada reflected the conservative, family-oriented values of the largely rural (and mostly francophone) society of 19th-century Quebec, as well as the economic liberalism of the burgeoning commercial and industrial (and primarily anglophone) élites concentrated in Montreal. In structure and style, the Code reflected the 1804 French Code very closely. Nevertheless, it rejected major elements of the French Code which were new law (since 1763 or 1789) and socially unacceptable to most Québécois (notably divorce), while maintaining elements of the pre-revolutionary French law (e.g. the fideicommissary substitution).

Although most of the original draft of the code was done in French (subsequently translated into English), all of Book Fourth and most of Book Third were originally drafted in English. In order to deal with any potential conflicts between the French and English texts, Article 2615 of the Code stated:

2615. If in any article of this code founded on the laws existing at the time of its promulgation, there be a difference between the English and French texts, that version shall prevail which is most consistent with the provisions of the existing laws on which the article is founded; and if there be any such difference in an article changing the existing laws, that version shall prevail which is most consistent with the intention of the article, and the ordinary rules of legal interpretation shall apply in determining such intention.

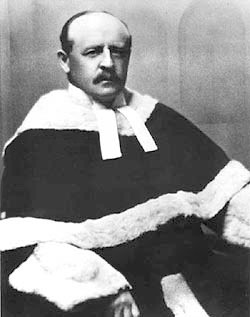
Francis Alexander Anglin

In 1922, Francis Alexander Anglin, in addressing the Junior Bar of Quebec on the impact of the Code, observed:

In the civil code, you possess a precious heritage. Yours is indeed a great and noble responsibility: the thought of seeing to it that the administration of that code is worthy of its conception and shall reflect no discredit on the genius and ability of the great jurisconsults who produced it. Would that this excellent and scientific body of law, so detailed and so logically complete, were better known throughout the other provinces of Canada!

== Replacement ==
From 1888 to 1979, the Code was amended to reflect the various social and commercial changes occurring within Quebec society. In 1890, the Parliament of Canada ousted articles 2279–2354 of the Code with the passage of the Bills of Exchange Act.

Work commenced in 1955 on the revision of the Civil Code of Lower Canada, which eventually led to the passage of the Civil Code of Quebec by the National Assembly of Quebec on 8 December 1991, brought into effect on 1 January 1994.

The repeal of the CCLC did not affect those provisions that affected areas within federal jurisdiction, which continued to be in force in Quebec (insofar as they had not been displaced by other federal Acts) until they were finally repealed by the Parliament of Canada on 1 June 2001. The same legislation also provided framework provisions relating to marriage in the Province, that were "to be interpreted as though they formed part of the Civil Code of Québec."

== Bibliography ==
- Code civil du Bas-Canada, d'après le rôle amendé déposé dans le bureau du greffier du conseil législatif, tel que prescrit par l'acte 29 Vict., chap. 41, 1865 (in French). C.O. Beauchemin & Valois. 1866.
- The Civil Code of Lower Canada: together with a synopsis of changes in the law, references to the reports of the commissioners, the authorities as reported by the commissioners, a concordance with the Code Napoleon and the Code de commerce, special references for notaries, clergymen, physicians, merchants, real estate owners, and persons out of Lower Canada, and a complete index. Thomas McCord. 1867. ISBN 978-0-665-40178-7.
- Charles Chamilly de Lorimier et Charles Albert Vilbon, La bibliothèque du Code civil de la province de Québec (1885), Cadieux & Derome (in French)
- Pierre-Basile Mignault, Le Droit civil canadien basé sur les « Répétitions écrites sur le code civil » de Frédéric Mourlon avec revue de la jurisprudence de nos tribunaux par P.B. Mignault, conseil de la reine, Whiteford & Théoret, éditeurs (volume 1, 1895), C. Théoret, éditeur (volumes 2–6, 1896–1902), Wilson & Lafleur, éditeurs (volumes 7–9, 1906–1916), Montréal. (in French)
- E. Fabre-Surveyer (1939). "The Civil Law in Quebec and Louisiana". Louisiana Law Review. 1 (4). Paul M. Hebert Law Center: 649–664.
- "The Civil Code of Quebec". The Encyclopedia of Canada. 1948.
- John E.C. Brierley (1968). "Quebec's Civil Law Codification" (PDF). McGill Law Journal. 14 (4). McGill Law School: 521–589.
- David Howes (1987). "From Polyjurality to Monojurality: The Transformation of Quebec Law, 1875-1929" (PDF). McGill Law Journal. 32 (3). McGill Law School: 523–558.
- Brian J. Young (1994). The Politics of Codification: The Lower Canadian Civil Code of 1866. McGill-Queen's University Press. p. 134. ISBN 0-7735-1235-7.
- Nicholas Kasirer (2005). "Si la Joconde se trouve au Louvre, où trouve-t-on le Code civil du Bas Canada ?". Les Cahiers de droit (in French). 46 (1–2): 481–518. doi:10.7202/043850ar.
