= Charles Dewey Day =

Canadian lawyer, politician and judge (1806–1884)

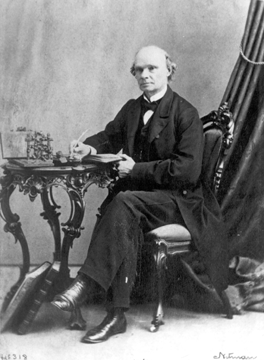

Member of the Special Council of Lower Canada
- In office May 23, 1840 – February 10, 1841

Solicitor General of Lower Canada
- In office May 26, 1840 – February 10, 1841
- Succeeded by: Himself
- In office February 10, 1841 – June 20, 1842
- Preceded by: Himself
- Succeeded by: Thomas Cushing Aylwin

Member of the Legislative Assembly of the Province of Canada for Ottawa County
- In office 1841 – June 21, 1842
- Preceded by: None; new position
- Succeeded by: Denis-Benjamin Papineau

Court of Queen's Bench, Lower Canada
- In office June 28, 1842 – December 31, 1849

Superior Court of Lower Canada
- In office January 1, 1850 – 1862

Commission for the Codification of the Civil Laws of Lower Canada
- In office February 4, 1859 – August 1, 1866 Serving with René-Édouard Caron, Augustin-Norbert Morin (1859–1865), and Joseph-Ubalde Beaudry (1865–1866)

Royal Commission of Inquiry into the Pacific Scandal
- In office 1873–1873 Serving with Antoine Polette and James Robert Gowan

1st Chancellor of McGill University
- In office 1864–1884
- Succeeded by: James Ferrier

Personal details
- Born: May 6, 1806 Bennington, Vermont
- Died: January 31, 1884 (aged 77) England
- Party: Government Tory
- Spouse(s): (1) Barbara Lyon (m. 1830) (2) Maria Margaret Holmes
- Relations: Benjamin Holmes (father-in-law)
- Children: 3
- Profession: Lawyer; judge
- Known for: Civil Code of Lower Canada

Charles Dewey Day, QC (May 6, 1806 – January 31, 1884) was a lawyer, political figure, and judge in Lower Canada and Canada East (now Quebec). He was a member of the Special Council of Lower Canada, which governed Lower Canada after the Lower Canada Rebellions in 1837 and 1838. He was elected to the first Legislative Assembly of the Province of Canada in 1841, but resigned in 1842 to accept an appointment to the Court of Queen's Bench of Lower Canada.

Day also served on the commission for the codification of the civil laws of Lower Canada, which produced the Civil Code of Lower Canada, enacted in 1866. Day wrote all of the provisions of the Civil Code relating to commercial law, and most of the provisions relating to property rights. He was later appointed to the federal royal commission investigating the Pacific Scandal, whose investigation contributed to the downfall of the federal Conservative government of Sir John A. Macdonald in 1873.

Day was interested in promoting education throughout his life, and from 1864 to his death in 1884 was the first chancellor of McGill College, now McGill University.

== Family and early legal career ==
Day was born in Bennington, Vermont in 1806, the son of Ithmar Day and Laura Dewey. His father was likely employed by the North-West Company. The family moved in 1812 to Montreal in Lower Canada, where his father was involved in retail businesses, particularly pharmacies and provisions for the fur trade. In 1828, the family moved again, this time to Wright's Town, Lower Canada (now Gatineau, Quebec), across the Ottawa River from Bytown (now Ottawa). His father established a sawmill, fulling-mill and blacksmith shop.

Day studied in Montreal, articled in law, and was called to the bar of Lower Canada in 1827. He practised mainly in the Ottawa Valley and represented lumber merchants such as the Wright family. In 1838, he was named Queen's Counsel.

Day married twice, first to Barbara Lyon in 1830, with whom he had three children, and then in 1853 to Maria Margaret Holmes, daughter of Benjamin Holmes, a Montreal merchant and political figure.

== Political career ==
=== Lower Canada ===
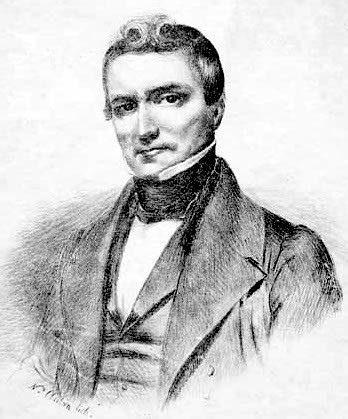
Louis-Joseph Papineau, primary drafter of the Ninety-Two Resolutions, which Day opposed

Day’s political career began in 1834, when he spoke publicly against the Ninety-Two Resolutions, passed by the Legislative Assembly of Lower Canada. The Resolutions were drafted by the Parti patriote, the nationalist French-Canadian party led by Louis-Joseph Papineau. The Resolutions were highly critical of the British government of Lower Canada, particularly the Legislative Council of Lower Canada, the appointed upper house of the Lower Canada Parliament. The Legislative Council was dominated by British Canadians and frequently rejected measures passed by the elected Legislative Assembly.

Day spoke strongly in favour of maintaining the British connection and opposed what he saw as a revolutionary approach in the Resolutions. He became a leading member of the Montreal Constitutional Committee, which was opposed to the Resolutions. He also was elected to a significant position on a committee formed to draft an address to the monarch and the British government outlining the political views of the anglophone business community in Montreal.

The political tensions in Lower Canada led to the Lower Canada Rebellions of 1837–1838. Day was appointed deputy judge advocate, and presided over some of the trials of Patriote rebels. In 1840, Day was appointed to the Special Council of Lower Canada, which the British government created to govern the province, after it suspended the Lower Canada Parliament following the Rebellion. Day was also appointed solicitor-general of Lower Canada.

=== Province of Canada ===
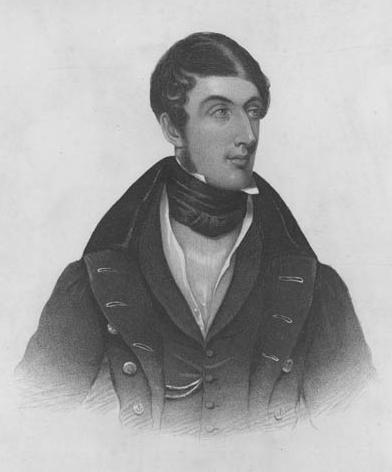
Governor General Lord Sydenham, who kept Day in the Executive Council

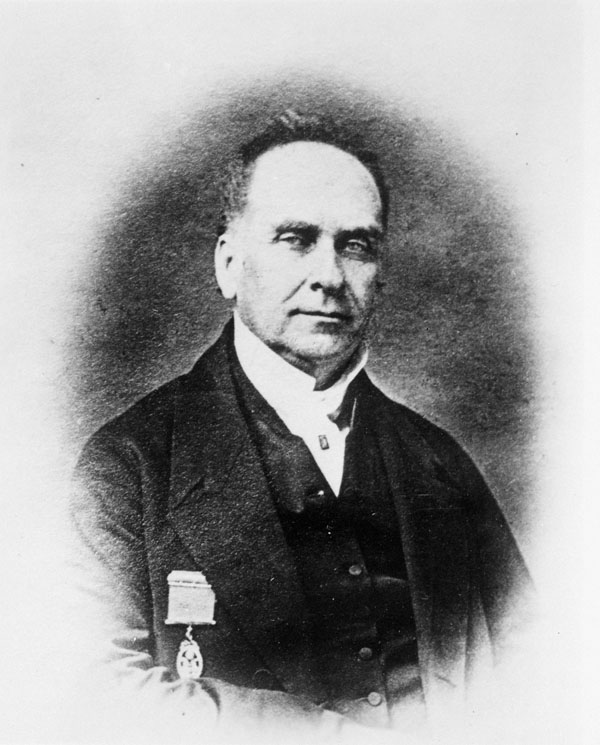
Robert Baldwin, dismissed from Executive Council because he protested Day's position on the Council

As a result of the Lower Canada Rebellion, and the similar rebellion in Upper Canada (now Ontario), the British government merged Lower Canada and Upper Canada into a single Province of Canada in 1841. The separate parliaments were abolished and replaced by a single parliament for the entire province, composed of an elected Legislative Assembly and an appointed Legislative Council. The Governor General retained a strong position in the government.

Day was invited by Governor General Lord Sydenham, to join the Executive Council as solicitor-general for Canada East (the new name for Lower Canada), on condition that he hold a seat in the Legislative Assembly of the Province of Canada, the elected lower house of the Parliament. In the general elections of 1841, Day was a candidate in the Canada East constituency of Ottawa County. He was supported by Ottawa timber merchants such as Ruggles Wright, and campaigned in favour of the union of the two Canadas. Day won the seat, but the election was hotly contested. His committee's election costs were approximately £1,580.

Day's appointment to the Executive Council triggered a dispute between Lord Sydenham and Robert Baldwin, also a member of the Council and one of the leaders of the Reform group in the new Parliament. Baldwin's focus was on instituting a system of responsible government, where the Governor General would appoint the Executive Council from the group with a majority in the Legislative Assembly. As part of that policy, Baldwin wanted to ensure francophone Reformers from Lower Canada would be in the Council. Sydenham opposed Baldwin's plan. His policy was to retain as much control as possible over the government, and not to include a French-Canadian party in the Council. Baldwin wrote to Sydenham, protesting the inclusion of Day and other Government Tories, and the exclusion of French-Canadian representatives. Sydenham treated the letter as a resignation: Baldwin was out, and Day stayed in the Executive Council. It was the first skirmish in the battle for responsible government.

The first session of the new Legislative Assembly began with a motion on the union of the two Canadas. Day voted in favour of the union, along with the other Government Tories from Lower Canada. During the session, he was a consistent supporter of Governor General Lord Sydenham.

As solicitor-general, Day introduced a Common Schools Act, which included grants from the provincial government to support primary schools throughout the province. The Common Schools Act was the beginning of public education in the province, and also the beginning of separate schools on religious lines, which eventually became entrenched in the British North America Act, 1867 (now the Constitution Act, 1867).

Sydenham died suddenly at the end of the first session. The following year, in 1842, the new governor general, Sir Charles Bagot, was trying to reconstruct the ministry to better reflect the composition of the Legislative Assembly. He offered Day an appointment to the Court of Queen's Bench of Lower Canada, which Day took, resigning from the government. his resignation created a vacancy in the Executive Council, but Bagot had trouble finding a French-Canadian to fill the position. The Reformers of Lower Canada acted as a group, seeking to gain group representation for French Canadians in the Executive Council, not the occasional individual appointment.

== Later legal career ==
=== Judicial positions ===
Day was initially appointed to the Court of Queen’s Bench of Lower Canada in 1842. Eight years later, in 1850, he was appointed to the Superior Court. In 1862, he resigned his position on that court and resumed his legal practice.

=== Civil Code of Lower Canada ===
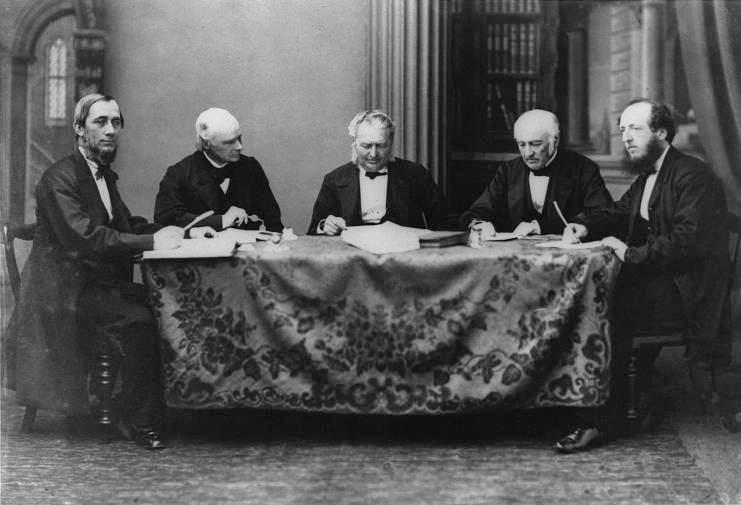
A meeting of the three civil code commissioners around 1865, with the two secretaries to the commission. Day is second from the left.

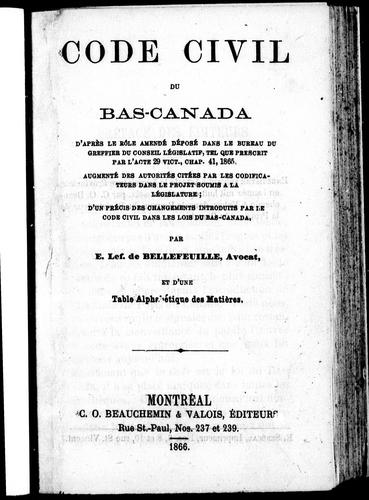
Civil Code of Lower Canada, enacted in 1866

In 1859, Day was appointed to the three-person commission to develop the Civil Code of Lower Canada. Up to that point, the civil law of New France and then Lower Canada had been based on French statutes, royal decrees, and the customary law from the Paris area, the coutume de Paris. Those sources of the law had become increasingly outdated, particularly after France adopted the Code Napoléon, which replaced the older sources of law in France. George-Étienne Cartier, the joint premier for Lower Canada, appointed Day and two other Lower Canada judges, René-Édouard Caron and Augustin-Norbert Morin, to the commission. Their mandate was to review the civil laws of Lower Canada and prepare a draft civil code for enactment by the Parliament of the Province of Canada.

The commissioners worked for six years on the project. When Morin died in 1865, he was replaced by Joseph-Ubalde Beaudry for the remaining term of the Commission. Day was the main author of the portion of the proposed code dealing with commercial law, which was his legal specialty. His work became the fourth book of the Civil Code of Lower Canada, entitled "Commercial Law". He also wrote a substantial portion of "Book Third, Of the Acquisition and Exercise of Rights of Property".

The commissioners completed their work in 1865 and submitted the draft of the code to Parliament. By a statute passed in 1865, the Parliament approved the draft code, with a number of corrections and additions for the commissioners to review. In 1866, the provincial Cabinet passed an order-in-council authorising the Governor General to proclaim the Code in force on August 1, 1866.

By the time of its enactment, shortly before Confederation in 1867, the Code was seen as an important statement of Quebec's control over its own legal system in the new country. Thomas McCord, who had been one of the secretaries to the commission, produced one of the first commercial versions of the Civil Code. In his preface, he wrote:

The English speaking residents of Lower Canada may now enjoy the satisfaction of at last possessing in their own language the laws by which they are governed, and the Province of Quebec will bring with her into the Confederation a system of laws of which she may be justly proud; a system mainly founded on the steadfast, time-honored and equitable principles of the Civil Law, and which not only merits admiration and respect, but presents a worthy model for legislation elsewhere.

The Civil Code of Lower Canada remained the statement of Quebec's civil law for over a century, until the enactment of the Civil Code of Québec in 1991, which replaced the old code.

=== Arbitrator under the Constitution Act, 1867 ===
After Confederation in 1867, the province of Quebec appointed Day as their representative on the arbitration board set up to divide the assets and liabilities of the former Province of Canada between the new provinces of Quebec and Ontario.

=== Counsel before the British-American Joint Commission ===
Flag of the Hudson's Bay Company

In 1869, Day was retained by the Hudson's Bay Company to argue its case before the British-American Joint Commission appointed under a treaty between the two countries, signed in 1864, respecting property claims in the Oregon Country (referred to as the Columbia District by Britain). The Hudson's Bay Company and its subsidiary, the Puget Sound Agricultural Company, had operated in the area that Britain ceded to the United States by the Oregon Treaty of 1846. The Oregon Treaty stated that they were entitled to fair compensation for their lands. The 1864 treaty set up the joint commission to adjudicate the claims.

Day appeared before the commission in Washington, DC on behalf of the Hudson's Bay Company. He argued that the Company was entitled to $1,388,703.33. However, the final award was $200,000.

=== Royal Commission on the Pacific Scandal ===
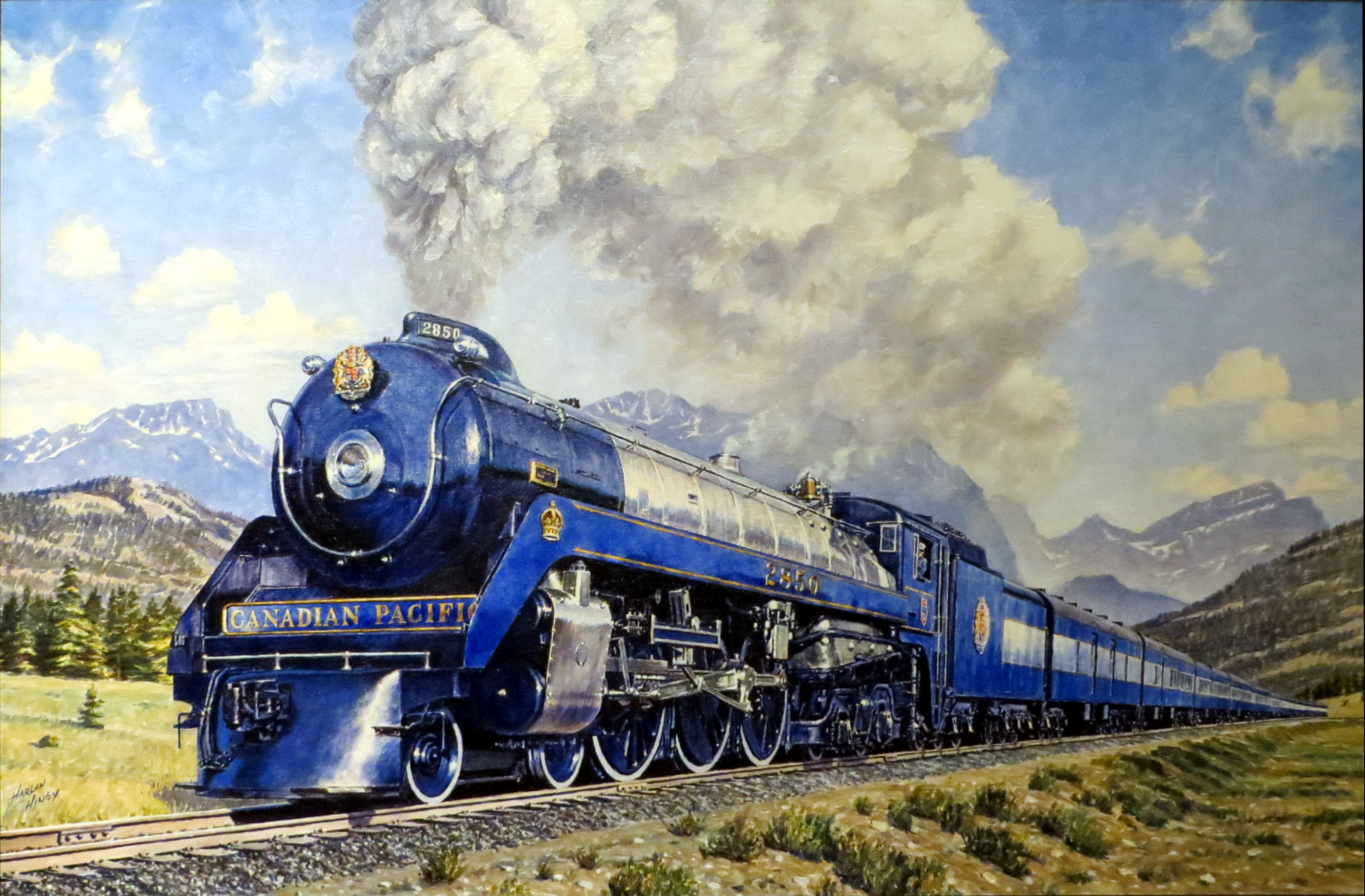
Canadian Pacific Railway engine

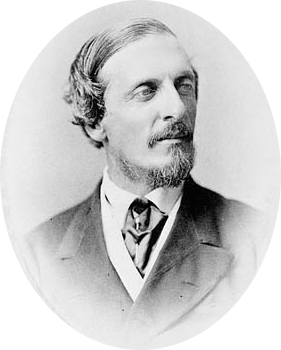
Governor General Lord Dufferin, who spent two days with Day, reviewing the royal commission's evidence

In 1873, Day was appointed chair of the Royal Commission which investigated charges of corruption against the federal government in the Pacific Scandal. The commission’s mandate was to investigate allegations that the Conservatives under Prime Minister Sir John A. Macdonald had agreed to give the contract for the Canadian Pacific Railway to Sir Hugh Allan, owner of the Allan steamship line, in exchange for substantial campaign donations to the Conservatives in the 1872 federal election.

Day was proposed as a possible chair for the commission by Sir Hector-Louis Langevin, the federal Minister of Public Works, who had sounded Day out and found that he was generally sympathetic to the position of the Macdonald government. The other members of the commission were two judges, Antoine Polette and James Robert Gowan.

The Liberal opposition boycotted the commission proceedings, because they had wanted an inquiry by a parliamentary committee. As a result, only witnesses proposed by the government were called, and only Prime Minister Macdonald cross-examined them. The witnesses' testimony was often evasive, and the commissioners did not ask many questions of the witnesses.

The commission did not make any findings, but simply filed the transcripts of the evidence with Parliament, when it returned following a prorogation. Day met personally with the Governor General, Lord Dufferin, for two days and went over the evidence with him. Dufferin concluded that the evidence cleared Macdonald of personal corruption, and of any knowledge of the key point, that Allan had covert arrangements with American financiers for control of the proposed railway. However, on one point, Macdonald admitted that the Conservatives had used some of the money received from Allan for improper election expenses.

The opposition Liberals relied on the evidence of the commission in the subsequent debates in Parliament, which ended with the resignation of the Conservative government and the installation of a Liberal government, led by Prime Minister Alexander Mackenzie.

== Promoter of education ==
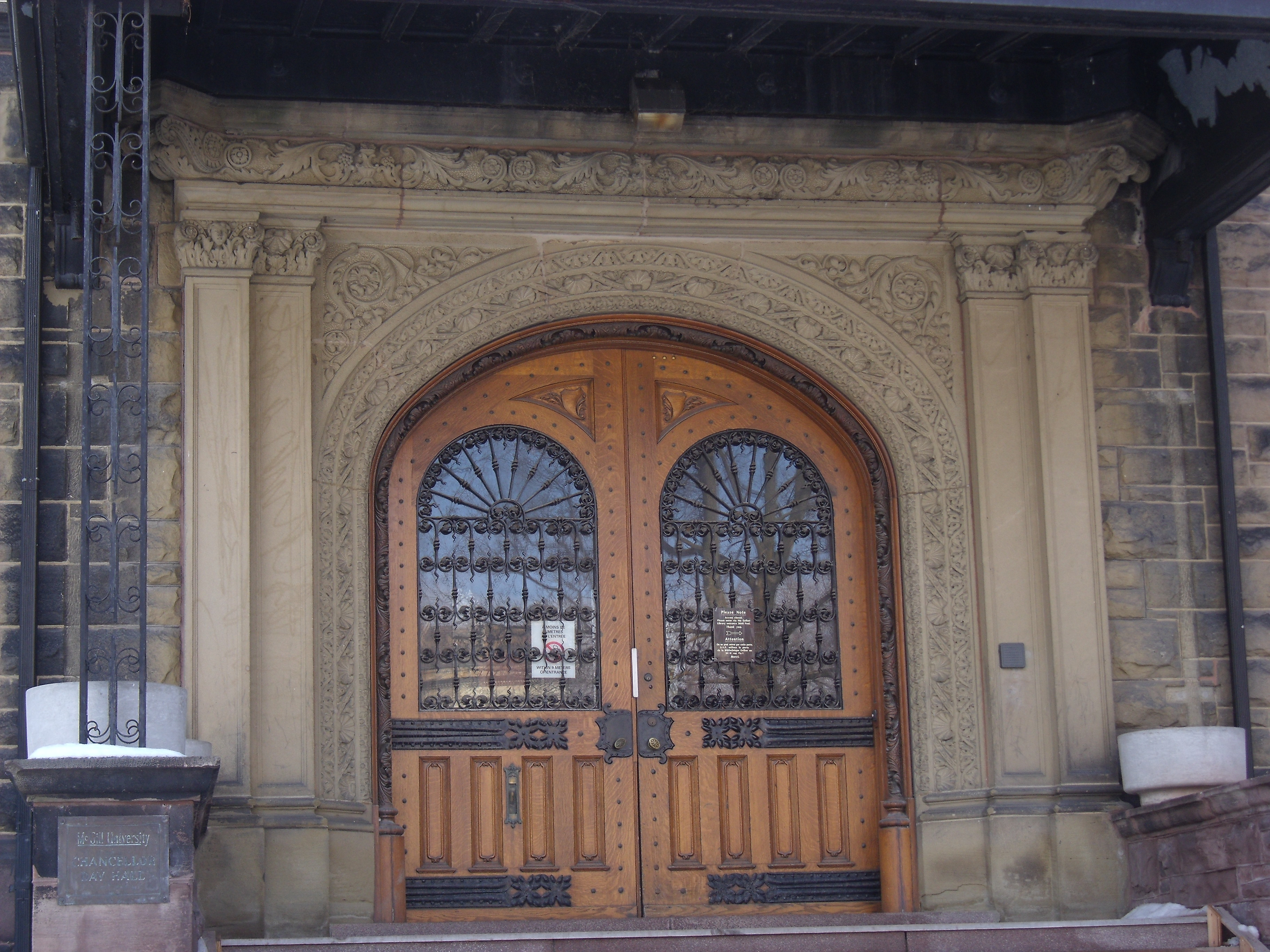
Entrance to Chancellor Day Hall, McGill Law School, named after Day

Day was strongly interested in improving educational facilities in Lower Canada. As early as 1836, he had joined a Montreal committee formed to improve education in the province. It included amongst its members several who would become leaders in the Patriote movement. From 1842 to 1852 he was the vice-president of the Anglican Church Society, possibly because of the Society's educational goals. In 1869 he was appointed to the Quebec Council of Public Instruction, serving from 1868 to 1875 as the chairman of the Council's Protestant Committee.

From 1852 to 1884, Day served as president of the Royal Institution for the Advancement of Learning in the province. The Institution was an umbrella body that provided funding for a variety of educational facilities in the province, including McGill College (now McGill University). As a member of the board of the Institute, he helped with changes to the governing legislation which established McGill College as independent entity, although still affiliated with the Institute. He was the principal pro tem of the College from 1853 to 1855. From 1864 to 1884, he served as chancellor of McGill and helped establish the McGill Law School.

== Death ==
Day died during a visit to England in 1884, aged 77.

== See also ==
1st Parliament of the Province of Canada
