= St. George's Cathedral (Kingston, Ontario) =

The Cathedral Church of Saint George
- St. George's Cathedral
- The Cathedral Church of Saint George
- 44°13′46″N 76°28′59″W
- Location: 270 King Street East; Kingston, Ontario
- Country: Canada
- Denomination: Anglican Church of Canada
- Website: stgeorgescathedral.ca

History
- Status: Cathedral
- Founded: 1792
- Founder: John Stuart
- Dedication: St. George
- Consecrated: 1828

Architecture
- Functional status: Active
- Architect: Thomas Rogers
- Style: Georgian & Neoclassical
- Groundbreaking: 1825

Administration
- Province: Canada
- Diocese: Ontario
- Parish: St. George

Clergy
- Dean: The Very Rev. Douglas Michael (2022-)

St. George's Cathedral in Kingston, Ontario, Canada, is the cathedral church of the Anglican Diocese of Ontario.

== History ==
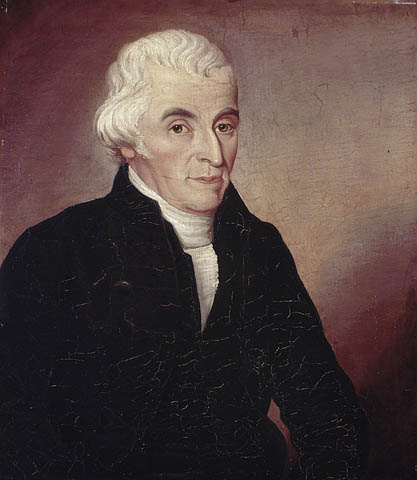
John Stuart served as the church's first rector

The original St. George's parish church was a wooden building constructed in 1792 located across from what is now Kingston Market Square, and was the first church built in the Kingston area. John Stuart was the Rector.

The present church building was constructed at another location (King St. at Johnson St.) during the years 1825–1828. Architect William Coverdale enlarged it in 1838–1840 with the addition of a rebuilt steeple and the doric portico 1842.

It was elevated to cathedral status in 1862. In 1891–1894 the transepts, choir and dome were built but shortly thereafter in 1899 the interior was badly damaged by fire. S. George Curry (architect) and Joseph Power performed a complete restoration in 1899–1900.

== Worship at the Cathedral ==
The Cathedral is currently led by The Very Rev. Douglas Michael (Dean of Ontario/Rector of Kingston, 2022-) and Brad Barbeau (Director of Music, 2020-). The current Bishop of Ontario is the Right Rev. William Grant Cliff (2023-).

Sunday Services: 8am (Holy Eucharist, BCP) & 10:30am (Choral Eucharist, BAS)

Choral Evensong: 1st and 3rd Wednesdays @ 7:00pm

Other weekday service times are available on the Cathedral website.

== Association with the Royal Military College ==
For many years Royal Military College of Canada (RMC) cadets and other military groups have marched into St. George's for worship on special occasions. 'Copper Sunday', an annual church parade from RMC to St. George's, in which cadets took up a collection of copper coins, was established in 1882 or earlier. A memorial tablet was erected before 1899 to the memory of three officers, graduates of the Royal Military College of Canada, who died while serving in Africa: Huntly Brodie Mackay, Captain Royal Engineers; William Henry Robinson, Captain Royal Engineers; and William Grant Stairs, Captain the Welsh Regiment, but was lost in the 1899 fire and was not replaced.

In 1918, the Royal Military College's Great War Memorial Flag was presented to the rector of St. George's Cathedral, the Very Rev. Dean Starr, honorary chaplain to the college, by the then Commandant, Brig. General C. N. Perreau, C.M.G.. The 18 feet by 24 feet flag hung on the north gallery of the cathedral, until the summer of 1934, when it was removed to the college museum for preservation. 932 Maple leaves represent those graduates who served, and 147 crimson leaves represent those who paid the supreme sacrifice in the Great War.

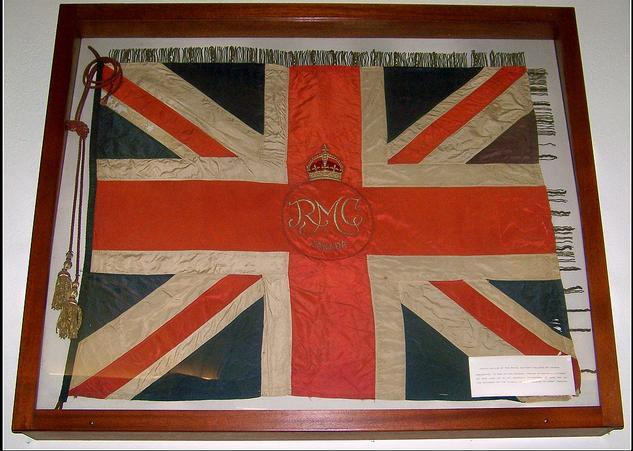
The King's Colour of the Royal Military College of Canada was placed in the cathedral in 1942.

In a 1942 church parade ceremony, General Hertzberg asked permission of the churchwarden, RMC Professor W.R.P. Bridger to lay up the RMC colours in the cathedral. After the congregation were addressed by the Lord Bishop of Ontario, the cadet battalion marched back to the college.

A virtual tour the Royal Military College of Canada gallery at the Cathedral Church of St. George features stained glass windows of several soldier saints including St. George. The most recent windows—the St. Cecilia window and the St. Margaret window—also in the RMC gallery, were installed in 2002 and 2003 respectively.

== Popular culture ==
St. George's Cathedral, Kingston was treated fictionally as St. Nicholas's, Salterton, in Robertson Davies's novel Leaven of Malice.

== Notable Burials ==
- Charles Poulett Thomson, 1st Baron Sydenham, Governor General of the United Province of Canada 1839-1841

== Gallery ==
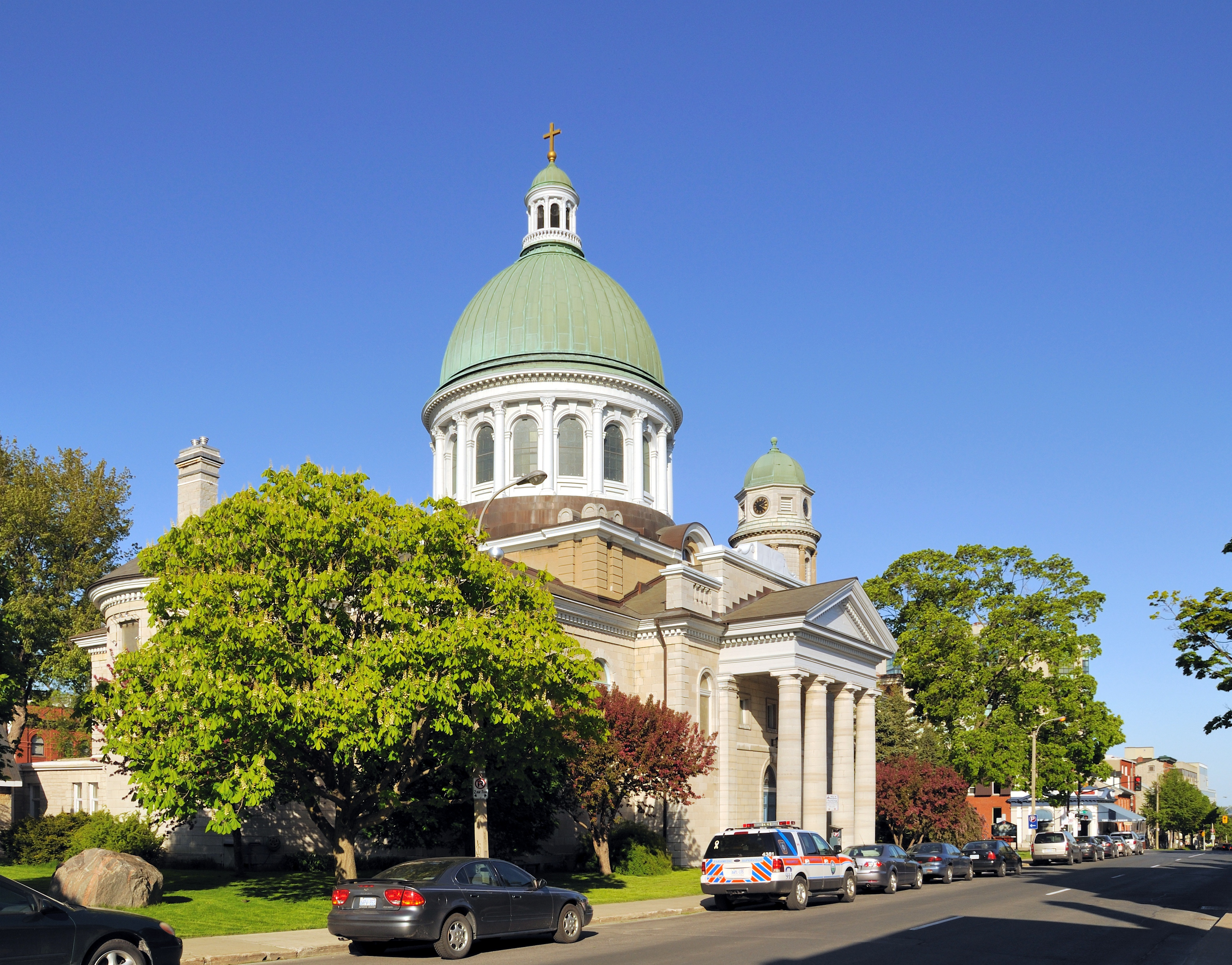
View in 2009

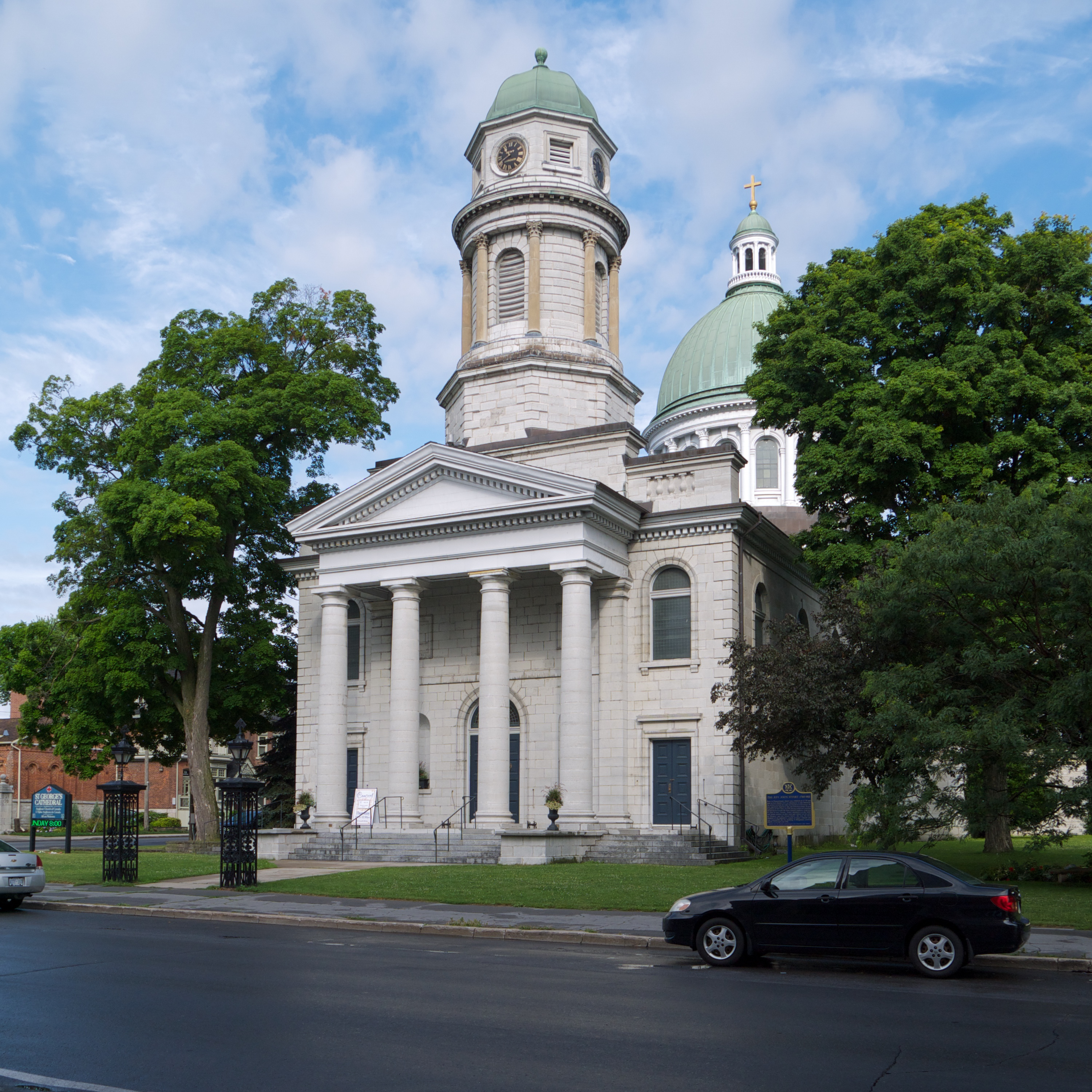
View in 2015

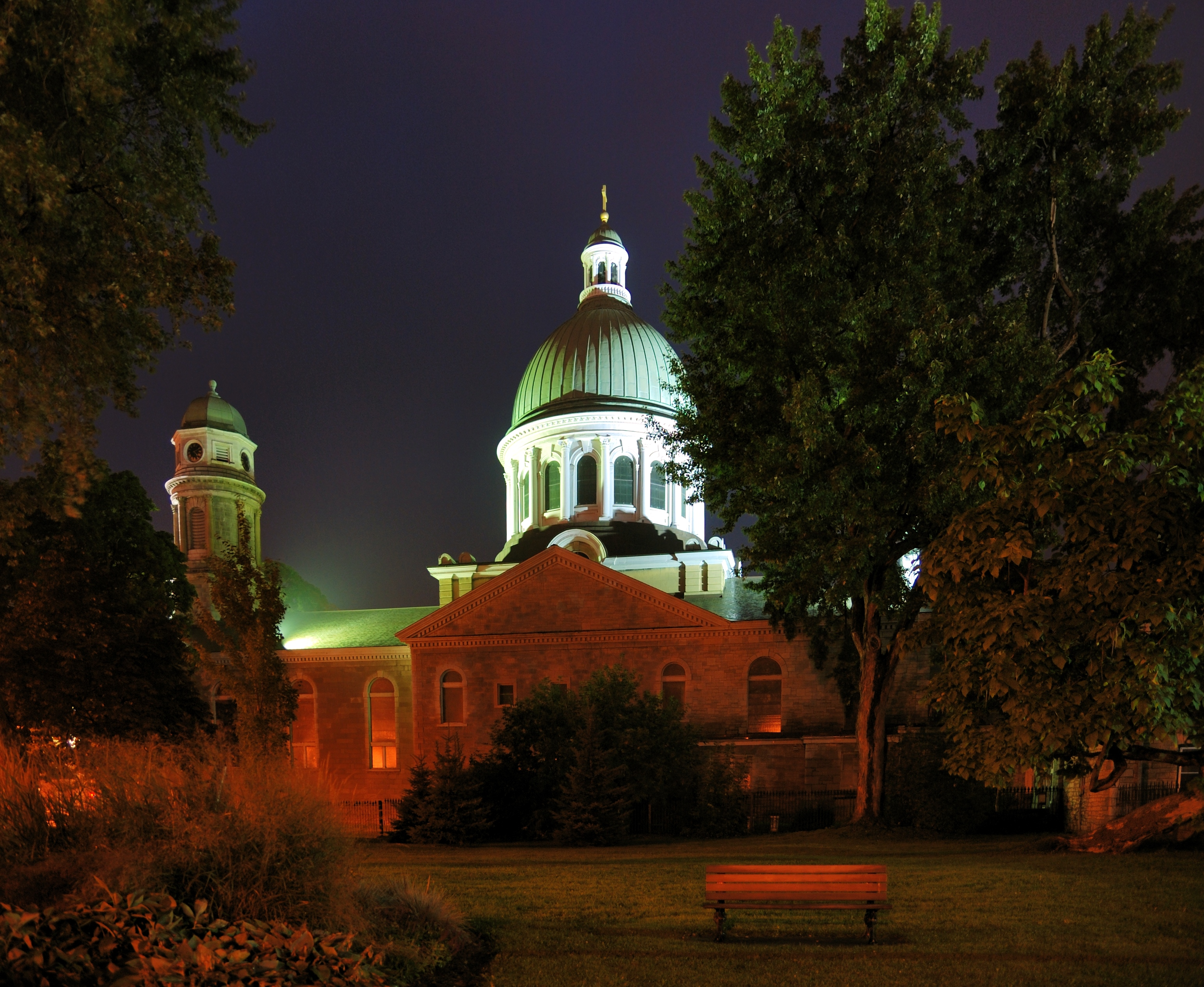
View at night

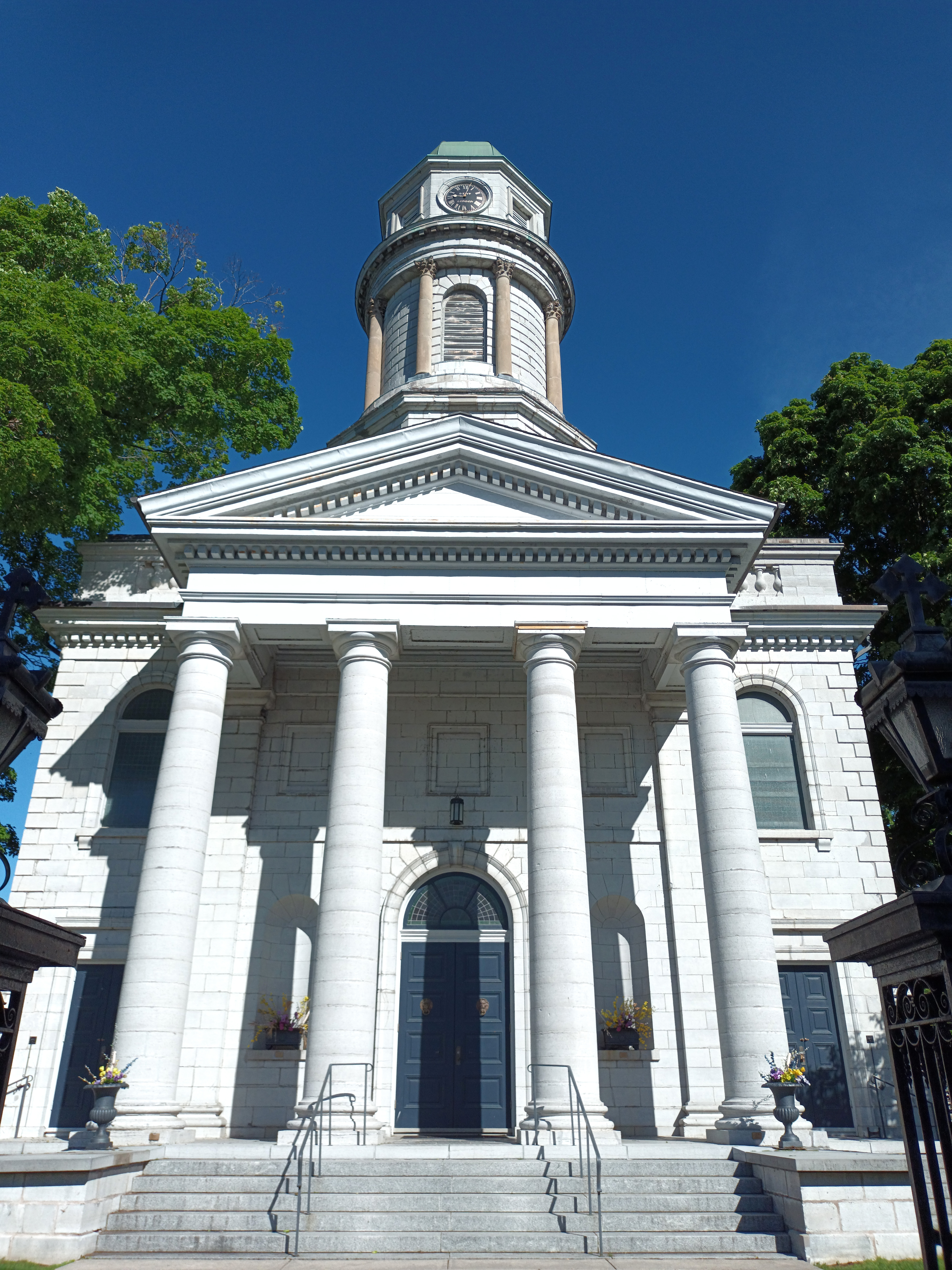
View in May 2024

== See also ==
- List of cathedrals in Canada
- Saint George in devotions, traditions and prayers
