= John Stuart (priest) =

American loyalist

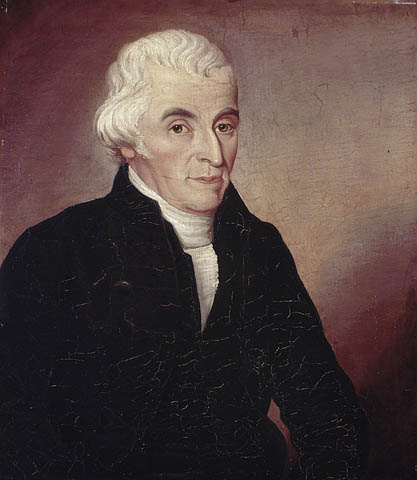
- John Stuart
- Born: 24 February 1740; Near Harrisburg, Pennsylvania, Colonial America
- Died: 15 August 1811 (aged 71); Kingston, Upper Canada
- Occupations: Anglican priest, missionary, and educator
- Spouse: Jane Okill
- Children: George, John, James, Charles, Jane, Andrew, Mary, Ann
- Parent(s): Andrew Stuart and Mary Dinwiddie

John Stuart (24 February 1740 – 15 August 1811) was a Church of England clergyman, missionary, educator, and Loyalist. He is noted for being the first chaplain of the Legislative Council of Upper Canada, for being the first Anglican priest in what is now Ontario, for building the first church (now St. George's Cathedral) in what is now Kingston, Ontario, and for opening the first grammar school in Upper Canada.

== Early life ==
John Stuart was born near Harrisburg, Pennsylvania in 1740. After graduating from the College of Philadelphia in 1763 he taught school, but returned to the college to complete a master's degree. He converted from Presbyterianism to Anglicanism and was ordained by the Bishop of London as a deacon, and later, as a priest. Stuart married Jane Okill in 1775 and they would have eight children.

== Missionary to the Mohawks ==
Upon receiving an appointment from the Society for the Propagation of the Gospel he was assigned as a missionary to the Mohawks at Fort Hunter, New York. His work of serving the people in his chapel at Fort Hunter began in 1770. He was also responsible for a small school at nearby Johnstown where he also conducted monthly services, and he ministered to the Mohawks at Canajoharie where he met Mohawk leader Joseph Brant. Stuart collaborated with Joseph Brant to translate the Gospel of St. Mark into the Mohawk dialect. Since Stuart was a Loyalist and an Anglican priest, he was harassed by American Revolutionary War rebels. His home was looted, property confiscated, and his church desecrated. He was almost arrested in 1777 but saved by Joseph Brant and his troops.

== British Canada years ==
By 1781, Stuart was permitted to leave for the Province of Quebec. He was exchanged for an army officer who had been imprisoned by the British. Stuart arrived in Canada with his wife, Jane (née Okill), three children and his black slaves. He settled in Montreal where he became the chaplain for the 2nd Battalion of the King's Royal Regiment of New York. He also operated a school and ministered to Loyalist settlers.

Stuart realized that prospects of obtaining a more secure position or obtaining property in Montreal were low, so in 1783 he petitioned Governor Haldimand to allow him to move to Cataraqui (now Kingston), grant him land and appoint him Chaplain of the Garrison of Cataraqui. He was successful and so he moved to Cataraqui with his family in 1785. He visited the neighboring Mohawk settlers and tended to his fellow citizens. His church consisted of only a room in the garrison quarters at Tête-de-Pont Barracks. The room was used until the first St. George's Church was built in 1792. St. George's was the first church to be built in the Kingston area. He is often referred to as the "Father of the Upper Canada Church".

In 1786 Stuart opened the first school west of the Ottawa River. It was located in one room in his rectory and had an enrolment of 30 pupils. The schoolroom was expanded by adding a small shed and it would become the first grammar school (Secondary School) in Upper Canada. He ran the school until 1788. In 1792, Lieutenant Governor Simcoe appointed him chaplain of the Legislative Council of Upper Canada. Stuart became the first Anglican priest in what is now the province of Ontario. In 1799 he was granted an honorary Doctorate of Divinity degree from the College of Philadelphia.

John and Jane Stuart had eight surviving children. Their eldest son, George Okill Stuart, would become rector of Kingston after the death of his father.

== See also ==
- Mohawk Chapel
