= Joseph-Ubalde Beaudry =

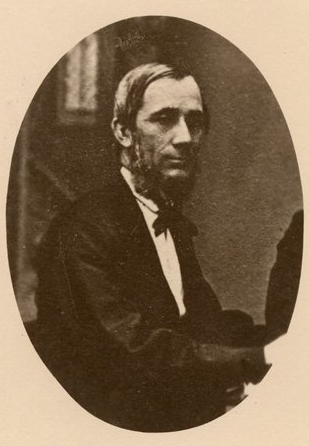

Commission for the Codification of the Law of Lower Canada
- In office August 1865 – August 1, 1866 Serving with Charles Dewey Day and René-Édouard Caron

Personal details
- Born: May 15, 1816 Montreal, Lower Canada
- Died: January 11, 1876 (aged 59) Montreal, Quebec
- Resting place: Notre Dame des Neiges Cemetery
- Spouse: Caroline Beaudry
- Children: Pierre-Janvier Beaudry; Joseph-Ubalde Beaudry
- Parent(s): Louis Beaudry; Félicité Dubreuil
- Education: Collège de Montréal
- Occupation: jurist and author
- Known for: codification of Civil Code of Lower Canada

Joseph-Ubalde Beaudry (May 15, 1816 – January 11, 1876) was a jurist and writer from Montreal.

Beaudry was educated at the Collège de Montréal where he was highly proficient in languages and the exact sciences. He entered the legal field as a law clerk for Côme-Séraphin Cherrier and became a lawyer in 1838. He spent some time practicing law before he became involved with judicial administration.

Joseph-Ubalde spent time in Saint-Hyacinthe as a clerk of the Court of Requests. Returning to Montreal in 1847, he was on city council and then became an alderman. In 1850, he became clerk of the Court of Appeal, and later became clerk of the Seigneurial Court. This court, presided over by Sir Louis-Hippolyte la Fontaine, was involved with changes to the land tenure seigneurial system in Lower Canada.

In 1859 Beaudry began his most important work on a commission for the codification of laws which had been created in 1857. He spent more than six years as a secretary on this commission. He then replaced Judge Augustin-Norbert Morin in 1865 as a commissioner. His role was important as was one of the principal drafters of the first edition of the new code.

Joseph-Ubalde Beaudry was also an assistant judge in the Superior Court later was promoted titular judge for the district of Montreal.

After his death in 1876, he was entombed at the Notre Dame des Neiges Cemetery in Montreal.
