= René-Édouard Caron =

Canadian politician and judge (1800–1876)

The Honourable René-Édouard Caron
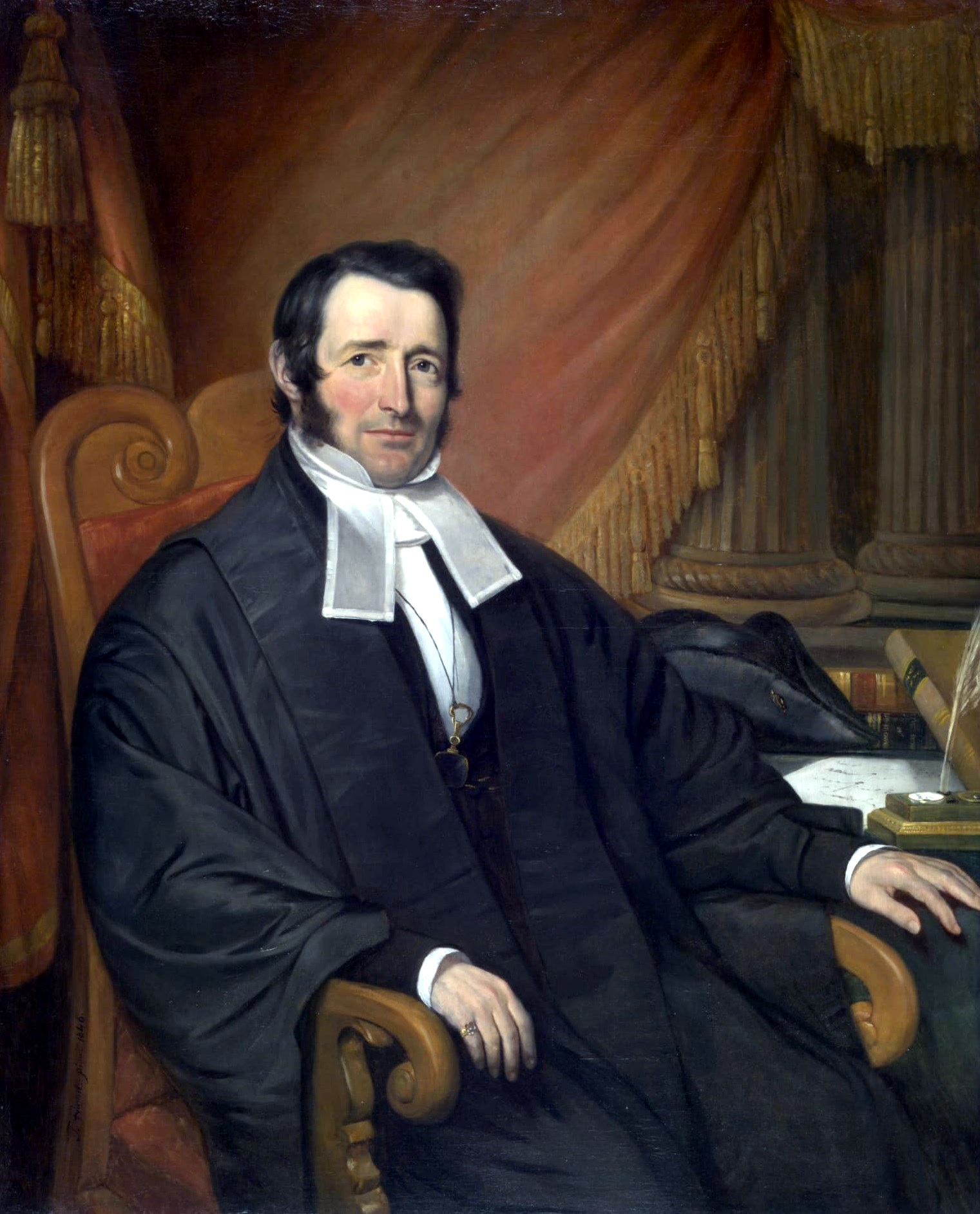
- Caron by Theophile Hamel, 1846

2nd Lieutenant Governor of Quebec
- In office 11 February 1873 – 13 December 1876
- Monarch: Victoria
- Governor General: The Earl of Dufferin
- Premier: Pierre-Joseph-Olivier Chauveau; Gédéon Ouimet; Charles Boucher de Boucherville
- Preceded by: Narcisse-Fortunat Belleau
- Succeeded by: Luc LeTellier de Saint-Just

Commission for the Codification of the Law of Lower Canada
- In office 4 February 1859 – 1 August 1866 Serving with Charles Dewey Day, Augustin-Norbert Morin (1859–1865), and Joseph-Ubalde Beaudry (1865–1866)

2nd Mayor of Quebec City
- In office 31 March 1834 – 9 April 1836
- In office 15 August 1840 – 9 February 1846
- Preceded by: Elzéar Bédard
- Succeeded by: George Okill Stuart, Jr.

Member of the Legislative Assembly of Lower Canada, Upper Town of Quebec (two-member constituency)
- In office 1834 – 7 March 1836 Serving with Amable Berthelot
- Preceded by: Jean-François-Joseph Duval; Andrew Stuart
- Succeeded by: Andrew Stuart (1836–1838)

Member of the Legislative Council of Lower Canada
- In office 22 August 1837 – 27 March 1836
- Succeeded by: None; Constitution suspended

Member of the Legislative Council of the Province of Canada
- In office 9 June 1841 – 16 March 1857
- Preceded by: New position

Personal details
- Born: 21 October 1800 Sainte-Anne-de-Beaupré, Lower Canada
- Died: 13 December 1876 (aged 76) Spencer Wood, Sillery
- Resting place: Cimetière Notre-Dame-de-Belmont, Sainte-Foy
- Spouse: Marie-Venerande-Josephine Blois (m. 1828)
- Children: Adolphe-Philippe Caron and 2 daughters
- Parent: Augustin Caron
- Education: Petit Séminaire de Québec

René-Édouard Caron (21 October 1800 – 13 December 1876) was a Canadian politician, judge, and the second Lieutenant Governor of Quebec.

He was born in Sainte-Anne-de-Beaupré, Lower Canada, the son of Augustin Caron, a well-to-do farmer and Member of the House of Assembly (MHA) for Lower Canada, and Élizabeth Lessard. He studied Latin at the college of Saint-Pierre-de-la-Rivière-du-Sud, which prepared him for admittance to the Petit Séminaire de Québec, in 1813. After later studying law in André-Rémi Hamel's office, Caron was called to the bar of Lower Canada in 1826. In 1828, he married Marie-Vénérande-Joséphine de Blois, the daughter of Joseph de Blois and Marie-Vénérande Ranvoyzé.

In 1833, he was elected as a municipal representative for the Palais district of Quebec City. In 1834, he was elected mayor by the city councillors and served until 1836. He was mayor again from 1840 to 1846. He was mayor when cholera broke out in 1834 and when a fire nearly destroyed the city in 1845.

In 1834, he was elected a Member of the Legislative Assembly of Lower Canada for the riding of Upper Town of Quebec. In 1841, he was appointed a member of the Legislative Council of the Province of Canada. He was the Speaker from 1843 to 1847 and again from 1848 to 1853. From 1844 to 1853, he was also in a law partnership with Louis de Gonzague Baillairgé. In 1853, he was appointed Judge of the Court of Appeal, and in 1855 of the Court of the Queen's Bench. In 1859, he took part in the codification of the civil laws. He remained a judge until 1873 when he was appointed the second Lieutenant-Governor of Quebec. He served until his death in December 1876. He was buried at Cimetière Notre-Dame-de-Belmont in Sainte-Foy.

== Family ==
He married Marie-Vénérande-Joséphine de Blois, daughter of Joseph de Blois and Marie-Vénérande Ranvoyzé, of Quebec, on 16 September 1828, at Notre-Dame de Québec. She died on 25 March 1880, and was buried at cimetière Notre-Dame-de-Belmont, alongside her husband. The couple's son Adolphe-Philippe later became a member of the Canadian House of Commons and cabinet minister. Their daughter Corine married Sir Charles Fitzpatrick, who became Chief Justice of Canada and Lieutenant-Governor of Quebec. Their daughter Marie-Joséphine married Jean-Thomas Taschereau, later a judge in the Supreme Court of Canada, and was the mother of Louis-Alexandre Taschereau, a premier of Quebec.

Descendants

- Augustin Caron (1778–1862), m. Élizabeth Lessard (1774–1823)
  - René-Édouard Caron (1800–1876), m. Marie-Vénérande-Joséphine de Blois (1829–1886)
    - Adolphe-Philippe Caron (1843–1908), m. Marie-Clotilde-Alice Baby (1833–1924)
    - Marie-Elmire Corinne Caron, m. Sir Charles Fitzpatrick (1853–1942)
    - Marie-Joséphine Caron (1839–1915), m. Jean-Thomas Taschereau (1814–1893)
      - Joseph-Édouard Taschereau (1863–1891), m. Marie-Clara-Amelie Dionne (1865–1948)
      - Louise-Josephine Taschereau (1866–1959)
      - Louis-Alexandre Taschereau (1867–1952), m. Marie-Emma-Adine Dionne (1871–1952)
