= Francis Godschall Johnson =

Canadian politician

The Honourable Sir Francis Godschall Johnson
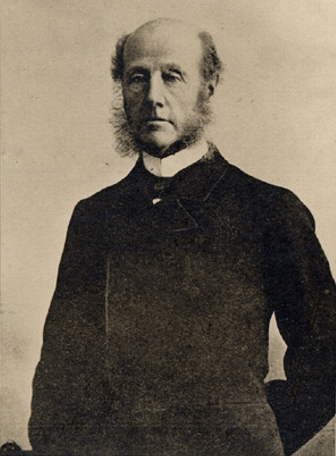

Chief Justice of the Superior Court of Quebec
- In office 1889–1894
- Preceded by: Sir Andrew Stuart
- Succeeded by: Sir Louis-Napoléon Casault

Personal details
- Born: January 1, 1817 Oakley House, Bedfordshire
- Died: May 27, 1894 (aged 77) Quebec City

Sir Francis Godschall Johnson (January 1, 1817 – May 27, 1894) was a Canadian office holder. He was appointed Lieutenant Governor of Manitoba on April 9, 1872, but had his commission revoked before he was sworn in. In 1889, he was appointed the 4th chief justice of the Superior Court of Quebec.

== Early life ==
Born New Year's Day, 1817, at Oakley House in Bedfordshire. He was the son of Captain Godschall Johnson (1780–1859), formerly of the 10th Royal Hussars, and his wife Lucy (died 1823), daughter of Sir Cecil Bishopp (1753–1828) 8th Bt., of Parham Park, West Sussex; 12th Baron Zouche. He was a nephew of Colonel Cecil Bisshopp. Francis Johnson was educated at Harrow and afterwards at Saint-Omer and Bruges. In his early life he had the reputation of an excellent athlete, and in later life he was remembered as a renowned wit.

Johnson moved to Montreal, Lower Canada, in the 1830s, where he studied law. From 1834 to 1836, he articled under Henry Pearce Driscoll of Montreal. He was called to the bar in 1839, and became known as a leading figure in criminal law. His career was undoubtedly helped by his bilingualism. On February 11, 1848, he was appointed a queen's counsel (QC).

Politically, Johnson was a Conservative. He was elected a vice-president of the British American League in 1849, and opposed the Rebellion Losses Bill later in the same year. He also signed the Annexation Manifesto, for which he was stripped of his QC (which was not restored until 1853).

On March 4, 1856, at St John's Church, Red River, he married Mary Louisa Mills, eldest daughter of Thomas Milliken Mills of Taunton, Somerset.

== Legal career ==
In 1854, Johnson was commissioned by the Hudson's Bay Company to work as a legal administrator in Assiniboia. He was soon recognized as one of the most competent figures in the Company, and became Assistant Governor of Assiniboia on July 19, 1855. On November 26, he succeeded William Bletterman Caldwell as governor, also retaining his legal portfolio. He appears to have been popular and respected during his time in the territory.

Johnson returned to Montreal in 1858, and resumed his legal practice. He was appointed a judge in 1865.

In 1870, he was commissioned by George-Étienne Cartier to become the first legal recorder in the new province of Manitoba. He was sworn in on October 19, and sought to develop a functioning legal system in the province.

== Political career ==
On October 21, 1870, Lieutenant Governor Adams George Archibald appointed Francis as a legislative councillor in the North-West Territories. This appointment made him the first councillor and member of the Executive Council in the territory. The appointment to the Temporary North-West Council was quickly revoked by the federal government, however, which ruled that Archibald had overstepped his authority in granting it.

On April 9, 1872, Johnson reluctantly agreed to replace Archibald as lieutenant governor of the territories. This appointment was also revoked, following opposition in the House of Commons of Canada to a government appointee holding two paid positions. Johnson was never sworn into office, despite his continued popularity in the region.

== Judicial career ==
Johnson returned to Montreal later in 1872, and was appointed a judge of the Superior Court of Quebec. On December 9, 1889, he was appointed its chief justice.
