= Henry Pearce Driscoll =

Lt.-Colonel Henry Peard Driscoll (1792-1869) Q.C., J.P., was an Anglo-Irish officer court-martialled and discharged from the British Army at Montreal. Remaining there he edited two newspapers and became well known as a lawyer, poet and wit.

== Early life ==
In 1792, Henry Peard Driscoll was born in Dublin. He was a son of Timothy Driscoll (1760-1835) K.C., "for many years known on the Munster circuit as a barrister of considerable practice," and his wife Mary Ann Campbell (d. 1816), daughter of the Rev. Dr John Campbell (1724-1772) B.A., LL.B., LL.D., of Newgarden House; Vicar-General of Tuam, County Galway. His first cousins included Mrs Richard Graves and Lt.-Col. Joseph Netterville Burton, the father of Captain Sir Richard Francis Burton and Lady Stisted, wife of the Lieutenant Governor of Ontario. Also on his mother's side, he was related to the first cousins Sir William Collis Meredith, 2nd Chief Justice of Quebec, and Sir Richard Graves MacDonnell, briefly the Governor-General of Nova Scotia.

In 1806, Driscoll entered Trinity College, Dublin. After graduating, he chose a military career and was commissioned as an Ensign into the 2nd Battalion of the 67th (South Hampshire) Regiment of Foot, going with them to Spain. The battalion saw little action, spending most of its time guarding the garrison at Cartagena.

== Military service ==
At the outbreak of the War of 1812, Driscoll received a lieutenancy in the newly formed 99th/100th Regiment and came to Canada. The regiment was sent to the frontier on the Niagara Peninsula and participated in most of the actions fought there, performing a brilliant feat of arms by the surprise and capture of Fort Niagara in the winter of 1813. At the Battle of Chippewa his regiment suffered heavy losses. In 1817, Lieutenant Driscoll was court-martialled at Montreal and discharged from the British army "for having falsely, calumniously, and maliciously traduced the character of his commanding officer, Brevet Major John Martin" in an address he gave before Lt.-General Sir Gordon Drummond at the conclusion of the war in 1814.

== Legal career ==
Driscoll remained in Montreal, where he studied for the bar in the offices of Denis-Benjamin Viger. At the same time as his studies, he edited the Herald newspaper while living on Rue Saint-Paul, and in 1819 he was the editor of the Courant too. In May 1823, Driscoll was called to the Bar of Lower Canada. He got on rapidly, gaining the reputation of being a clever, eloquent and witty lawyer. He was invited to run for Parliament at Carleton County, Upper Canada, where many of his old regiment had been granted land, but declined. In time, he took silk and was for a long time Crown Prosecutor in the Criminal Terms. The future 4th Chief Justice of Quebec, Sir Francis Godschall Johnson, articled under him from 1834 to 1836. He saw active service during the Lower Canada Rebellion of 1837–38, and as a favourite of Lord Durham, he was appointed Lieutenant Colonel of the volunteers.

In 1840, he was appointed police magistrate, and a seat on the Bench lay before him. But, his levity of character, coupled with an irritable and sensitive spirit led him to quarrels, and duels, with many of his legal contemporaries, notably Judges Aylwin and Holland. Those who suffered from a sense of professional inferiority to the quick-tempered old Irishman, and the lash of his wit, did all they could to disparage him and point out his weaknesses, but in the end it was his disregard of public opinion that precluded him from becoming a judge, to which his talents clearly entitled him. On his death, except for Côme-Séraphin Cherrier, he was the oldest serving member of his profession in Montreal.

Driscoll had many good qualities, the chief of which was benevolence, which he often carried to excess, "in the manner of poor Oliver Goldsmith"; and like that benevolent person, Driscoll was improvident and died poor. Though remembered as a great lawyer, Henry Driscoll had all the talents to attain high position and true lasting memory, but he threw away his opportunities. A strange peculiarity about him was that he did not like his own countrymen, and too frequently decried them.

== Poet and wit ==
Driscoll was possessed of a great wit and talent with words. He was affectionately known among his many admirers as "Grin-Chuckle", and everyone expected a bon mot or a pun from him. His epigrams were very pungent, and many of his witty sayings were remembered long after his death by the old citizens of Montreal. He was also an apt poet, and if all his epigrams and satires, etc., were collected, they would have made a good-sized volume, entitling him to a place among the poets of Canada. He died at his home, 16 Barclay Street, Montreal, on October 28, 1869. He was survived by at least two illegitimate sons - Netterville Driscoll, Barrister of Montreal, and the jovial Alfred Driscoll (1830-1893), of Aylmer; Prothonotary of Ottawa.

== Works ==
- Capture of Fort Niagara, by Lieutenant Henry Driscoll, 1814
