= Andrew Stuart (seigneur) =

The Honourable Sir Andrew Stuart

Chief Justice of the Superior Court for the Province of Quebec
- In office 1885–1889
- Preceded by: Sir William Collis Meredith
- Succeeded by: Sir Francis Godschall Johnson

Personal details
- Born: June 16, 1812 Quebec City
- Died: June 9, 1891 (aged 79) Quebec City
- Children: Gustavus George Stuart

Sir Andrew Stuart, QC (June 16, 1812 – June 9, 1891) was a Quebec lawyer, judge, seigneur and businessman.

He was born at Quebec City in 1812, the son of Andrew Stuart, and studied at Edward Parkin's school at Chambly. He articled with his uncle Sir James Stuart 1st., Bt. and then with Henry Black, was called to the bar in 1834 and set up practice at Quebec City. In 1842, he married Charlotte-Elmire, the daughter of seigneur Philippe-Joseph Aubert de Gaspé. He purchased the seigneury of La Martinière in 1846. In 1851, with a partner, he purchased the Saint-Maurice ironworks from his brother Henry; six or seven years later, they abandoned the operation which were taken over by John McDougall in 1862. Stuart was named Queen's Counsel in 1854. In 1859, he was named assistant judge in the Superior Court of Lower Canada and, in 1860, puisne judge for the same court. In 1885, he was named chief justice in the Quebec Superior Court. He acted as administrator for the province during the illness of Lieutenant Governor Louis-François-Rodrigue Masson in 1887 and was also made a Knight Bachelor in that year. Stuart retired from the bench in 1889. Born an Anglican, he became a Roman Catholic in 1890.

He died at Quebec City in 1891.
