= George Okill Stuart =

Canadian clergyman (1776–1862)

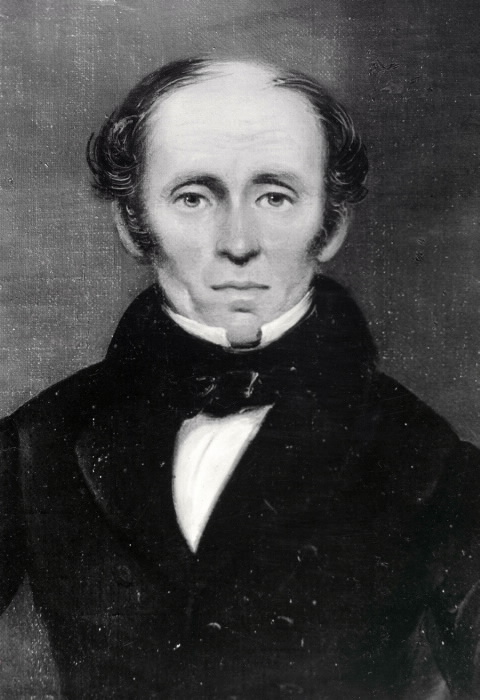
- Born: June 29, 1776; Amsterdam, New York
- Died: October 5, 1862 (aged 86); Kingston, Canada West

George Okill Stuart (June 29, 1776 – October 5, 1862) was an Anglican clergyman and educator who was born into a Loyalist family that came to Canada in 1781. He was born at Fort Hunter near Amsterdam, New York, the son of the Reverend John Stuart and Jane Okill. The family first settled in Montreal but moved to Cataraqui (now Kingston, Ontario) in 1785.

Stuart studied at his father's schools in Montreal and Kingston. He went on to study at Union College in Schenectady, New York and at King's College in Windsor, Nova Scotia. Stuart opened a school in Kingston in 1795. His formal education was completed at Harvard College, which granted him an AB in 1801. By that time he had been ordained a deacon of the Church of England in Canada now the Anglican Church of Canada. Stuart was sent to York (later Toronto). He opened a school there which became the Home District Grammar School and served as its first schoolmaster. He married Lucy, the daughter of John Brooks, later governor of Massachusetts, in 1803 and, in 1812, succeeded his father at Kingston. Stuart was also designated as the bishop's official in Upper Canada. He was named archdeacon of York in 1821 and archdeacon of Kingston in 1827. Stuart was named to the council for Trinity College in 1851 and became the first dean for the district of Ontario in 1862.

The street that divides the campus of Queen's University from the Kingston General Hospital compound was named in his honour, as was a cluster of four other small streets near the hospital. The former is Stuart and the others are Arch, Deacon, George and Okill.

Stuart died in Kingston in 1862. His brothers Andrew and James both settled in Lower Canada, where they practiced law and were active in politics.
