= Sir James Stuart, 1st Baronet =

Lower Canada lawyer, politician and judge

Sir James Stuart Bt
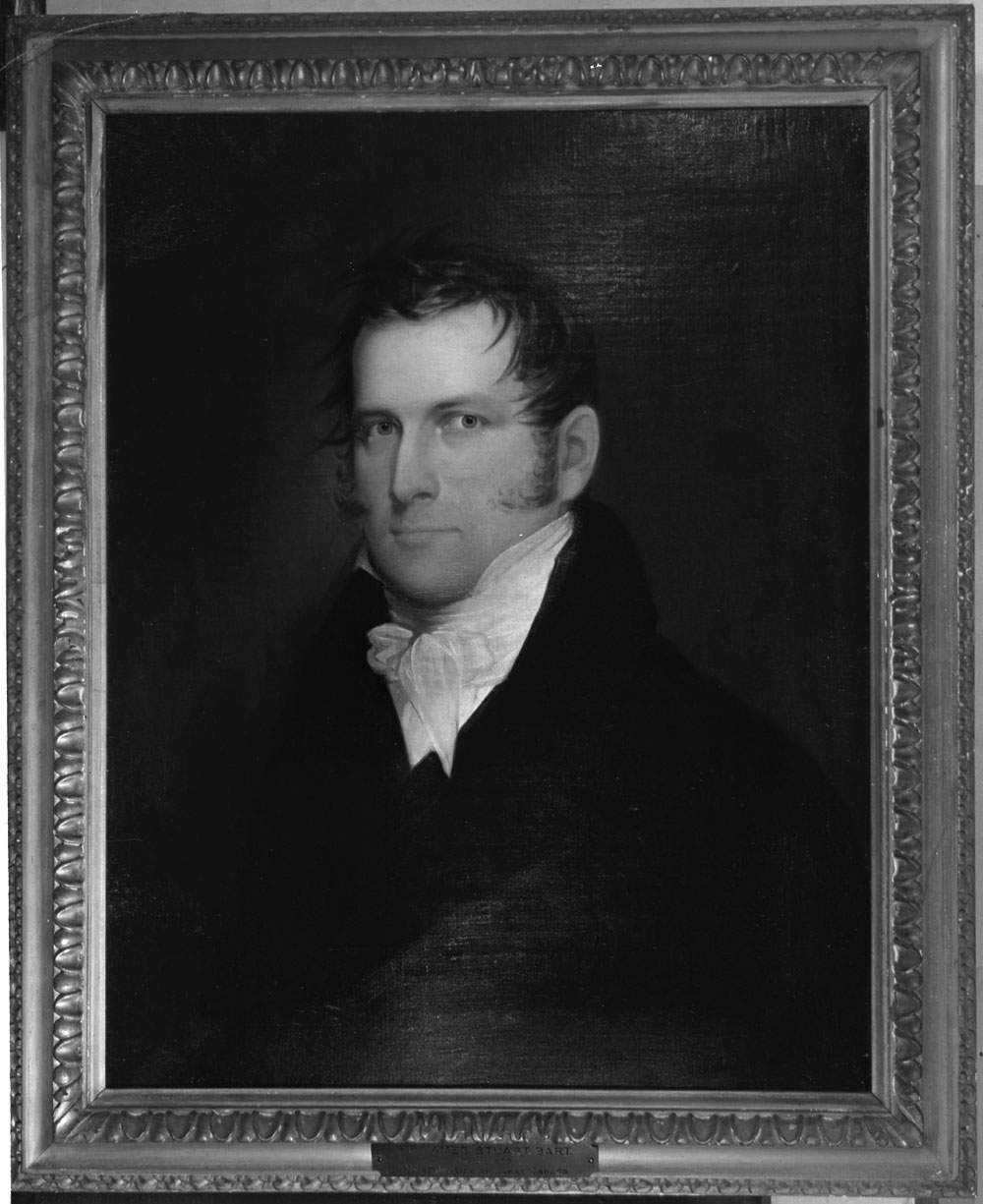

Chief Justice of Lower Canada
- In office 1838–1853

Member of the Special Council of Lower Canada
- In office 1838; 1839

President of the Special Council of Lower Canada
- In office 1839–1841
- Preceded by: James Cuthbert Jr.
- Succeeded by: Position abolished

Solicitor General for Lower Canada
- In office 1805–1809

Attorney General for Lower Canada
- In office 1825–1832
- Preceded by: Norman Fitzgerald Uniacke
- Succeeded by: Charles Richard Ogden

Member of the Legislative Assembly of Lower Canada for Montreal East
- In office 1808–1820

Member of the Legislative Assembly of Lower Canada for Buckingham
- In office 1814

Member of the Legislative Assembly of Lower Canada for William Henry
- In office 1825–1827

Personal details
- Born: March 2, 1780 Fort Hunter, New York
- Died: July 14, 1853 (aged 73) Québec City, Province of Canada
- Party: Parti canadien (until 1825); British Party (after 1825)
- Spouse: Elizabeth Robertson (m. 1818)
- Children: 4
- Parent: Rev. John Stuart (father)
- Education: University of King's College
- Profession: Lawyer

Sir James Stuart, 1st Baronet of Oxford (March 2, 1780 – July 14, 1853) was a lawyer, judge, and political figure in Lower Canada.

== Personal life ==
He was born in Fort Hunter, New York, in 1780, the son of the Anglican priest John Stuart, a United Empire Loyalist. He studied at King's College in Windsor, Nova Scotia and then apprenticed in law in Lower Canada with John Reid and then Jonathan Sewell; he was called to the bar in 1801.

== Politics ==
Stuart served as personal secretary for Lieutenant Governor Sir Robert Shore Milnes. In 1805, he was named solicitor general for the province. Stuart was elected to the Legislative Assembly of Lower Canada for Montreal East in 1808 and was reelected in 1809. He supported the Parti canadien in the assembly. He was defeated in 1810, but elected for Montreal County in an 1811 by-election and served as leader of the Parti canadien, replacing Pierre-Stanislas Bédard. In 1814, he was elected for both Montreal and Buckingham counties and chose to represent Montreal; he was reelected in 1816. In the assembly, Stuart led the attack against the judges Jonathan Sewell and James Monk; it was felt that by revising the rules of practice for the courts, these judges had stepped outside of their jurisdiction and taken on authority that should have been under the control of the legislature. After his party lost interest in pursuing this issue after 1817, Stuart lost interest in the affairs of the assembly. He was not reelected in 1820.

Unlike his former party, Stuart supported the union of Upper and Lower Canada proposed in 1822. In 1825, he was named Attorney General for Lower Canada. He was elected to the assembly for the riding of William-Henry in an 1825 by-election, now a supporter of the British party; he was defeated by Wolfred Nelson in the general election held in 1827. Stuart was named to the Executive Council of Lower Canada in 1827 and served until the union of Upper and Lower Canada in 1841. He was dismissed as attorney general in 1832, after having been accused by the assembly of conflict of interest in a case involving the Hudson's Bay Company, which had retained Stuart as its attorney, and other abuses of his position. He was offered the position of Chief Justice for Colony of Newfoundland as a form of compensation, but refused this offer and returned to private practice. He served as a member of the Special Council that governed the province after the Lower Canada Rebellion and was president of this council from 1839 to 1841. Stuart was also named Chief Justice of Lower Canada in 1838. In 1841, he was created a baronet, of Oxford in the County of Oxford.

He died at Quebec City in 1853.

His brother Andrew was also a lawyer and a long-time member of the legislative assembly. His nephew George Okill Stuart later served in the legislative assembly for the Province of Canada and also as a mayor of Quebec City.

== Coat of arms ==
Coat of arms of Sir James Stuart, 1st Baronet
Adopted 1841 Crest Issuant from a Roman fasces (Note: The fasces was once a symbol of law, dating back to the Romans. When used in this context, it has no association with fascism) a demi-lion holding a thistle slipped and leaved proper Escutcheon Or a fess chequy Azure and Ermine between in chief two crosses patté Gules and in base a thistle slipped and leaved proper all within a bordure Azure Motto JUSTITIÆ PROPOSITIQUE TENAX (Latin for 'Tenacious of justice and firm of purpose') Other elements Red hand of Ulster baronet badge

== Notes ==
Baronetage of the United Kingdom
New creation	Baronet (of Oxford); 1841–1853	Succeeded by Charles James Stuart
