= Andrew Stuart (Lower Canada politician) =

Lower Canada politician (1785–1840)

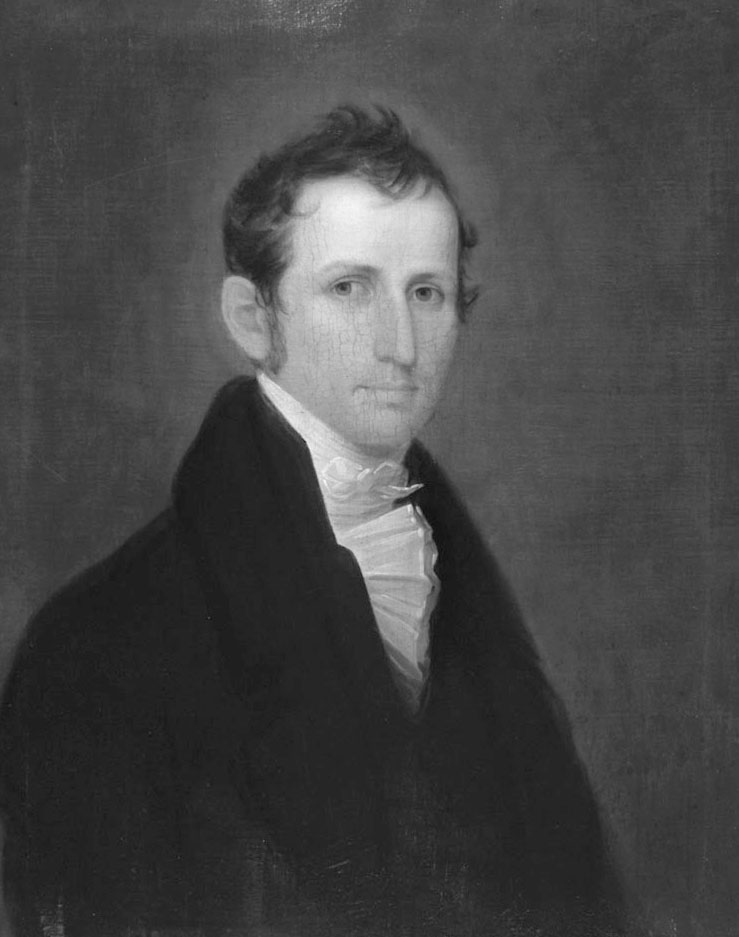
Canadian lawyer and politician Andrew Stuart

Andrew Stuart (November 25, 1785 – February 21, 1840) was a lawyer and political figure in Lower Canada.

He was born at Cataraqui in 1785, the son of the Anglican priest John Stuart, a United Empire Loyalist, and studied with the Reverend John Strachan and then at Union College in New York City. He studied law in Lower Canada, was admitted to the bar in 1807 and set up practice at Quebec City. He defended Pierre-Stanislas Bédard, who had been arrested for his involvement with the newspaper Le Canadien. Henry Black practiced with Stuart as a partner. Stuart was elected to the Legislative Assembly of Lower Canada for the Lower Town of Quebec in 1814 and reelected in 1816; he supported the parti canadien at that time. He was elected to represent the Upper Town of Quebec in April 1820 and continued to represent that riding until his defeat in 1834. Near the end of that period, Stuart became a supporter of the government party. Stuart voted against the Ninety-Two Resolutions. He was elected again in a by-election held in 1836 and served until the suspension of the constitution following the Lower Canada Rebellion. In 1838, he was named solicitor general for Lower Canada.

Stuart also served as president of the Literary and Historical Society of Quebec and vice president of the Société pour l'Encouragement des Sciences et des Arts en Canada. With John Charlton Fisher, he contributed material for Alfred Hawkins's book Hawkins's picture of Quebec; with historical recollections, published at Quebec in 1834.

Stuart died in Quebec City in 1840. His brother James was also a lawyer and member of the legislative assembly. His nephew George Okill Stuart later served in the legislative assembly for the Province of Canada and also as a mayor of Quebec City. His son Andrew became a seigneur and judge.
