= Custom of Paris =

Legal system in force in New France & Lower Canada (1627–1866)

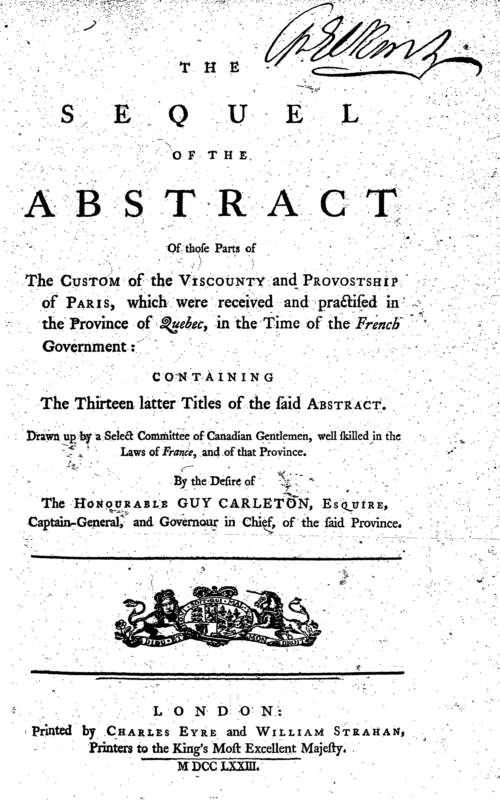
The Custom of Paris as practised in New France during the French government

The Custom of Paris (French: Coutume de Paris) was one of France's regional custumals of civil law. It was the law of the land in Paris and the surrounding region in the 16th–18th centuries and was applied to French overseas colonies, including New France. First written in 1507 and revised in 1580 and 1605, the Custom of Paris was a compilation and systematization of Renaissance-era customary law. Divided into 16 sections, it contained 362 articles concerning family and inheritance, property, and debt recovery. It was the main source of law in New France from the earliest settlement, but other provincial customs were sometimes invoked in the early period.

The Custom of Paris was introduced in 1627 by the Company of One Hundred Associates. In 1664, under the royal charter of the French West India Company, Louis XIV made the Custom of Paris the only legitimate source of civil law in any French colony. In Quebec, however, it was not replaced until the Civil Code of Lower Canada entered into force in 1866.

== French inheritance ==
The Custom first originated in 16th-century France as part of a larger project of centralization of law. French law was not unified; multiple regions with distinct laws stemming from each region's unique blend of jus commune and customary law. The Custom of Paris was just one of 360 uncodified custumals in effect across the different regions of 15th-century France.

The customary law of Paris was viewed as prestigious since it was the capital, so it began to be refined between the 13th and 15th centuries as part of a project of codification of all French custumals decreed by King Charles VII in the Ordinance of Montil-les-Tours in 1453. It was first compiled in 1510 and subsequently revised in 1580 by order of King Henry III, following a period of disuse. A symptom of the time in which it was written, the Custom's 362 articles attempted to merge feudal land tenure with the nascent town-centered commercialization of the Ancien Régime.

=== Initial implementation in New France ===
In 1663, upon the dissolution of the Company of One Hundred Associates, New France came under direct rule by the French crown. The Custom was officially introduced in New France by Article 33 of the royal charter establishing the French West India Company in May 1664. The company retained control of the colony for a decade thereafter.

The Custom had been a part of the justice system of Canada since the 1627 founding of the Company of One Hundred Associates, which previously managed French holdings in North America. The unilateral application of the Custom to the colonies was a solution imposed by the French monarchy after 1664. Despite the judicial unity, customary practice varied across regions.

Institutionally, the colony found itself governed by a three-part government in 1665. The Intendant, who represented one third of this body, was charged with the policy areas of justice, police, and finance, for which the Custom of Paris was relevant. The Custom evolved rapidly in New France, to the extent that in 1760 it was, as applied in Montreal and Quebec City, the "law of Canada", and on certain points had diverged significantly from its origins in France.

== Property and tenure ==
=== Movable and immovable property ===
Under the Custom of Paris, property was divided into movables (biens meubles: chattels, emblements, debts or 'obligations') and immovables (biens immeubles: land, buildings, fixtures, etc.).

In the interest of encouraging trade, movable property could not be mortgaged and was not considered separate property (biens propres), that is, property in severalty external to the marital community unless specified in the marriage contract. Immovables such as land, offices, and rentcharges (rentes constituées) were considered separate property if acquired by one of the spouses prior to the marriage or inherited directly by either spouse.

Immovable property purchased during the marriage was considered to be after-acquired property (conquêts) and incorporated into the marital property but would become separate property as soon as the estate went into succession. The distinction between separate property (biens propres) and community property (biens communs, or biens de communauté) was very important; many limitations were imposed on the alienation of separate property.

=== Feudal tenure ===
Land was subject to feudal tenure and could be held in allod or fief, the latter coming in two distinct forms—either free socage (seigneurie) or villein socage (roture). Free socage was considered 'noble' (but the owner did not have to be a member of the nobility) and the latter 'peasant'.

Under feudal tenure, a fief could not be owned outright but was instead divided into competing interests known as estates in land; thus, a single tract of land could be held both in villein socage by a tenant and in free socage by the lord of the manor. Villein socage was subject to a number of real burdens and feudal incidents owed to the manorial landlord. For example, the Custom provided for the payment of an annual feu-duty (the cens) by villein socagers to the landlord as both revenue and as a token of submission. The entry fine (lods et ventes) was another mandatory payment, a conveyance fee for villein socages and amounting to a twelfth of the sales price, derived from the feu-duty, as were other fees and the right of laudatio (retrait lignager).

Additionally, the Custom of Paris accorded a number of privileges to lords over villein socagers who were their tenants. They included the right of soke (right to hold court), restrictions, as well as astrictions such as a monopoly over mills and milling (thirlage), water power, hunting, and fishing (piscary). Peasants also had to pay a fixed quitrent for land as specified in their deeds of enfeoffment, and tenants were not permitted to run down their tenancy to the point that the revenue it generated would fail to cover their annual feu-duties. The Custom also contained the equivalent of a building code, outlining rules for property held in common, but in general, police regulations were more important for construction, fire prevention, and public hygiene in New France.

== Marriage community ==
=== Overview ===
Under the Custom, when a couple got married in New France, the couple married in community of property (communauté de biens), which means that the couple's marital property was co-owned. However, any immovable property purchased prior to marriage or directly inherited remained separate property (biens propres); all other property acquired after the marriage was concurrently owned by the spouses as community property (biens communs, or biens de communauté).

The husband was the "head and master" (seigneur et maître) of the community property; the wife could not alienate property or conduct any other property transactions without her husband's approval. However, the husband was also required to get his wife's consent to undertake a transaction involving any of their community property. Essentially, the community as a legal entity, rather than either spouse separately, was the owner of the marital property. It was possible to marry out of community of property if both prospective spouses elected in a marriage contract to separation of property. Alternatively, the right to administer the community property could be awarded by a court to a wife who could prove that her husband was unfit in some way to administer their property.

=== Dower and jointure ===
Marriage contracts were often used to alter the rules of inheritance and to provide the surviving spouse and family with one or more financial safeguard(s). The most important such safeguard was dower (douaire), a fixed sum set aside for the wife to live on in the event of her husband's death and drawn from half of the marriage community reserved for the minor heirs.

The dower could take two forms: dower by custom (douaire coutumier), the income drawn from half of the husband's estate that could not be alienated during the husband's life or claimed by creditors after his death unless the wife formally renounced her rights, or contractual dower (douaire préfix), a sum of money stipulated in a marriage contract by the spouses’ respective families, with the wife's same rights applying. Dower by custom was more common among upper-class families in which both spouses held extensive assets, and contractual dower was much more common in general and used almost always by lower-class families.

Ultimately, the couple's children would inherit the dower property, but a widow had the right to live on its income for the duration of her life. Additionally, a widow could elect to walk away from the marital community on the death of her husband and therefore not be responsible for any of its assets or liabilities. This was done if the liabilities outweighed the value in the property that she was inheriting. Under such an agreement, the widow also retained control of her dower, which then became quite valuable and important for her to be able to get back on her feet. It was unavailable to widowers as they were typically the partners that incurred and held marital debt.

Both spouses had the option to put aside a certain amount of property (usually, a sum of money, certain movable property, or a combination of both) that was untouchable by creditors and did not belong to the community for the other spouse to claim in the event of the death of their partner. This was the jointure (préciput) and typically came to half the dower's value. Almost all married couples of the time created a jointure in their marriage contracts, and the vast majority of jointures were reciprocal.

In practice, the jointure allowed a widow to remove her bed, clothes, and personal effects from the marital community prior to the estate inventory, partition of the community, and payment of liabilities.

=== Abandonment of parental consent in New France ===
The nature of the socio-economic environment in rural Quebec was conducive to marriage. In contrast to France, the social pressures for marriages into affluent and prestigious households was not as pronounced in the new colony, which allowed for greater leniency in gaining parental consent. Sailors and soldiers from France required the approval of their superiors to marry in the colony. Parental consent as required under the Custom became problematic when parents were unwilling to consent to young marriages.

The imbalance of the sexes in the new colony led to a great number of marriages between youths, which was especially pronounced in the early years of settlement: the average age for girls was 12, boys 14. Furthermore, the vast availability of land acted as an incentive for marriage. Local administrators facilitated young marriages despite the lack of parental consent and reprimands from the central government and the local Sovereign Council. The Sovereign Council would punish clandestine marriages by either exiling the married couple to Île Royale or annulling the marriage.

Marriage contracts, while not required under the Custom, were a form of protecting economic interests and a form of security in the New World. Contracts of marriage community (communauté de biens) were significant as they contained important safeguards for widowed men and women as well as their children and orphans.

Legal separations were uncommon in 18th-century rural Quebec. Typically, couples desiring to separate would circumvent the legal process and have a notary draw up a contract to dissolve the marriage community by dividing their movable and immovable assets. It was difficult for women to obtain legal separation; if separation was obtained, women lacked full freedom, as they could not mortgage or alienate their fixed assets without the approval of the justice or their estranged husbands.

Upon the death of a spouse, remarriage was common and frequently occurred without great delay, which created additional complications for inheritance and property principles under the Custom.

=== Women's rights ===
==== Coverture ====
According to the Custom, a married woman was a feme covert subject to marital power, meaning she was legally considered to be a minor and so was under the guardianship of her husband. As for the husband, he was the legal "head and master" of the marital community property. As such, the wife was unable to make transactions without the permission of her husband.

She was, however, protected from egregious control of her affairs by her husband by the customary provision that he had to secure her consent before mortgaging, selling, or alienating any of the couple's community property. Empirical evidence suggests that while this provision was strictly obeyed, it was largely a formality, and there is no evidence that a wife ever officially exercised her power of veto over a transaction initiated by her husband. Of the importance of the marriage community to the implications of the Custom of Paris for early modern women living in New France, historian Allan Greer says:

The relationship between the spouses was clearly unequal, but the comunauté de biens, the fundamental principle governing marital property arrangements, gave women legal protection and a stake in family possessions that could not be ignored by any male 'head of household'.

The implications of the Custom regarding property were particularly important for widows. Under the Custom, the surviving spouse (husband or wife) had a right to half of the marital community property, but the deceased's separate property acquired prior to the marriage as well as the other half of the community property was inherited by the couple's children. Marriage contracts, however, often specified the conditions of inheritance for a widow in such a way that their financial future was prioritized over that of the family as a whole.

The husband's role as "head of household" and his effective control over the couple's marital property meant that he would have a significant impact on the material well-being of the family in the event of his death. Thus, the wife largely depended on the managerial abilities and good faith of her husband in according her sufficient material holdings on which to live and support her family in her potential widowhood.

==== Protection of widows: dower, jointure, and separate property ====
A married woman was not allowed to manage her own inheritances, but the usual (largely nominal) rules about asking her permission applied. Marriage contracts could not be used to overcome the Custom's doctrines of male marital power and the coverture of married women. The best that an egalitarian-minded couple could do was to stipulate in their marriage contract that the wife would have the right of administration over her own goods (benefit from their returns), but then, she did not have the right to alienate those goods freely and unilaterally. The essential point of the option was to protect the woman's fortune from the possible incompetence or malfeasance of her future husband. It also made the wife's nominal veto right over transactions more real in practice. However, contracts including such provisions were quite rare.

The Custom included some clauses that allowed wives to evade their apparent legal and economic subjugation by their husbands, if they were inclined to permit such a state of affairs. Once married, the husband could, as head of household, explicitly authorize his wife to manage (though not to dispose of) her inheritances, give her general or special power of attorney, or recognize her as a public merchant capable of transacting independently.

However, contemporary husbands were not commonly predisposed to initiating such measures.

The Custom of Paris provided for several specific measures for evening out the balance of power; the most important among these were the dower and the right of renunciation to an indebted community; also important was jointure. The Custom stated that if such a right was specified in the marriage contract, a widow could choose between taking a legal or contractual dower. The vast majority of early modern marriage contracts in New France provided for dowers, and in Quebec City and Montreal, the vast majority of wives with dower rights also had the right to choose their form. However, the principle that such transactions involving the dower could not be carried out by the husband without the wife's presence or written permission was not always respected.

One of the most important protective mechanisms for a widow under customary law was her right to renounce community property plagued by insurmountable debt and effectively walk away with her dower. A widower did not have that right to renounce the community's liabilities. The 18th-century Canadian lawyer François-Joseph Cugnet explained the principle as demonstrating inherent fairness in the treatment of women:

The husband being the master of the community and being able to dispose of it at will, it is necessary to afford the wife the privilege of renouncing the community, and to give her by this means the ability to rid herself of debts incurred during the marriage and transacted by the husband, as he alone could incur debts, without her consent, and the wife being unable to do so at all, without being so permitted by her husband, it must be the choice of the wife to accept or renounce the community.

Accordingly, almost all marriage contracts stipulated that a widowed woman renouncing her indebted marital community could not be held accountable for any liabilities of that community. Normally, the widowed woman could not be held accountable for debts on her own personal property unless she had an independent business separate from her husband's and was recognized as an independent public merchant by her husband or if she decided to continue to manage the community as an undivided entity with her minor children.

Therefore, it was in a creditor's best interest to insist that the wife be present for and participate meaningfully in all transactions involving the community property. That clause acted not only to protect women in widowhood but also to enhance their stature and involvement in family finances during the marriage.

Most marriage contracts stipulated that the spouses would not be held accountable for debts incurred by their partners prior to the marriage, so if such a debt was paid off using the community property, the spouse that did not incur the debt would have to be compensated for that payment upon the dissolution of the marriage. It was customarily permissible for a couple to stipulate in the marriage contract that the widow would have the right, if she renounced the indebted community, to retake her material input to the marriage free from any debt claims. That clause de reprise was included in the majority of relevant marriage contracts. As previously mentioned, the widow who renounced the community could walk away with her dower, but unless the marriage contract explicitly specified otherwise, did not have the right to also retain her jointure in the case of renunciation. Therefore, almost all relevant marriage contracts contained such a specification.

Finally, according to customary law, the widowed woman could claim from the community, prior to its partition, the value of any of her separate property that had been alienated during the marriage without the profits of that alienation being used to purchase other property. While technically this clause applied to both spouses, it existed to protect the wife from the abuses of the husband-administrator, who would benefit from the returns on such a transaction at the dissolution of the marriage when, as part of the community, it would be divided between the spouses even if it was the profit from the alienation of an item of the wife's separate property. If the community property's value was insufficient to provide compensation for such a transaction, the widow could lay claim to her deceased husband's separate property. The husband, if he was attempting to benefit from this clause on the death of his wife, had no such option.

The Custom also provided widows with other specific benefits. The husband's heirs were obligated to provide her with mourning clothes paid for out of their inheritance, whereas a widower had to pay for his mourning clothes personally. Somewhat amusingly, the explanation for the clause was that it compensated a widow for the fact that she would be reviled if she did not formally mourn her husband for at least a year, but no such expectation constrained a widower.

==== Daughters' inheritance ====
Divorce was uncommon in New France. While the Custom of Paris did not specify any hard and fast rules for such a situation, there is empirical evidence of a notary drawing up a separation agreement for an early modern Quebecois couple (Félicité Audet and Étienne Ledoux) that specified a fairly egalitarian custody arrangement regarding the couple's children and provided the wife with a perpetual material settlement in the form of agricultural provisions. The agreement also dissolved their community of property, enabling the wife to sell land and purchase a farm and a loom in order to support herself and her children. However, Audet likely counted herself lucky, as such a favourable settlement depended on the goodwill of the husband.

The evidence from notarial instruments suggests that while the value of movable goods bequeathed to children leaving the family hearth was about equal for both sexes, land was endowed in a very discriminatory fashion. While departing sons sometimes received a piece of land when they married, that was not the case for daughters in the same position. Customary law accorded women a share in property, including land, upon the deaths of their parents, such that in the mid-18th century, they received a part of the family estate. However, when parents created specific distributions of family property to come into effect if they should die, they prioritized getting their sons established and assumed that the families of their future sons-in-law would do the same, thus taking care of their daughters. Daughters were often left out of the inheritance of land.

Throughout the history of New France, peasant farmers increasingly disposed of their property while they were still living so transmission of land through the female line had practically disappeared by the end of the 18th century. Truly egalitarian distributions of land had been possible and occurred in the early period because farmers were often able to acquire huge tracts of land, with the express intention of providing future farms for a large family. However, sons were prioritized over daughters despite the Custom's equitable inheritance principles.

One final interesting implication of the Custom of Paris for women in New France was that customarily, daughters who entered religious orders were excluded from any inheritance of the community property of their families. These daughters were instead granted one-time dowries. Thus, it became quite economically practical and common for daughters of typically large, financially strained upper-class families to enter religious orders.

== Inheritance ==
=== Land ===
The Custom of Paris also set out what happened to a deceased's property on death, so wills were fairly rare. Since it was a legal matter, it was important to have a notary take inventory of the family estate in the event of the death of either spouse. To have some control over the process of inheritance and to provide safeguards for the widow and surviving family (to deviate somewhat from customary provisions as would best suit the family's needs and preferences), the couple could choose to specify the structure of family inheritance, to an extent, in their marriage contract. If no marriage contract was made, on the death of either the husband or wife, the surviving spouse would retain half of the assets and liabilities of the marital community.

The other half would be split evenly among the surviving children. Children were entitled to a legitime, whether they were male or female, and could access their inheritances at 25, the legal age of majority. They could not be disinherited. Estates in free socage (seigneuries) were subject to different rules of inheritance, and estates in villein socage had to be partitioned equally. A free socage was inherited unequally with half going to the eldest son and the rest being divided equally among his siblings.

In the case of the death of one spouse in a childless couple, the Custom stipulated that the half of the marital community normally reserved for the children of the family could go to a male cousin, a brother, or even the manorial landlord.

=== Legitime ===
The financial well-being of a deceased person's children was safeguarded in the Custom by the legitime, a sum equal to half of what each child would have received in an equitable division of the marital community property if no gifts or bequests had previously diminished it. Every child heir of the deceased parent had a right to that minimum amount of inheritance, and children who had been previously gifted from the family estate to the detriment of the legitime of one of their siblings would have to compensate that sibling appropriately. Accordingly, a parent had the right to bequeath property in a written will only if such action did not infringe on the legitimes of heirs-at-law and only for the value of movable property and one fifth of immovable property.

The community property could remain unpartitioned after the death of one spouse if all interested parties consented so that the estate could be dissolved and its components divided later, usually after the death or remarriage of the surviving parent. In the various transactions involved in the case of the death of both parents, a legal guardian, who was usually a relative, would protect the rights of minor orphans.

Depending on whether the estate was dissolved after the death of one or both parents, the minor heirs would share equally in either half of the community, minus the dower and often the jointure, or the whole community.

=== Implications on family ===
The Custom of Paris turned the family into a body corporate that usually co-owned property. That arrangement contributed to egalitarian family structures and a preoccupation with "fairness" in family matters in New France.

While technically property was divided into separate property and community property upon solemnizing of the marriage, early settlers often had no separate property, or brought plots of land that were virtually worthless into their marriages and reaped the benefit of such land only after years of combined labour. Thus, in practice, much separate property was incorporated into the marital community to avoid future disputes about added values and so forth. Even in subsequent generations, when land was more developed and children each inherited a portion of the family estate, inheritances of family land were often treated as movable property and therefore incorporated into subsequent marital communities, complicating patterns of inheritance and linking families together in intricate ways.

The strict rules set out for inheritance by the Custom of Paris commonly forced early modern families in New France (especially those of the first colonists) to act outside the law in the interest of self-preservation. Given that upon the death of half of a childless couple, the half of the community property customarily reserved for the children would revert to the relevant manorial lord, most contemporary marriage contracts specified a reciprocal gift (don mutuel) so if the couple in question was childless, the entire community of property would be inherited by the surviving spouse in the event of the death of either the husband or the wife. That was an especially crucial practice for the earliest settlers, who had no family around to support them if their spouse was to die, and it became increasingly common throughout subsequent generations. Customary law prohibited such gifts, but notaries still drew them up, as they were recognized to be key to the survival of individuals living in New France.

The inheritance rules of the Custom of Paris, which stipulated that children would inherit significant and equal portions of their parents’ community property, often served to keep these families tight-knit, as parents frequently opted to "set up" their children for their adult lives or ensure that their children would remain close at hand to care for them in their old age by providing them with advancements on their inheritance in the form of inter vivos gifts rather than dowries.

Parents (in practice, fathers) could also favour their heirs through testamentary gifts in their wills (common only in cases of divorce known as the separation of property, which occurred more among the upper classes). If parents married in community of property wished to favour one particular heir, customary inheritance laws necessitated an inter vivos gift since after the death of the parents, an egalitarian division of property would apply. Even examples of contemporary marriage contracts demonstrate that the ideals of the Custom with regards to family, inheritance, and marriage imbued families with a closeness and collaborative spirit in setting up the marital communities of their children and protecting them as best they could.

==== Blended families formed by remarriage ====
The Custom also had implications for blended families, which were extremely common in New France (approximately 1/4 to 1/3 of marriages involved at least one spouse who had been previously married, but that proportion decreased over time). In the case of a widowed mother who remarried, the Custom called for the dissolution of her former marital community after having been inventoried. Her half of the community property, in addition to her dower and possibly her jointure, became movable property that was incorporated into her new marital community, which was managed by her new husband. Her children from her first marriage would have no rights to their inheritances until they reached the age of majority (25). Any children born to the new couple would inherit from their community property.

However, when couples wanted each of their respective children and children together to receive an equal inheritance upon death (which was common, especially among the lower classes), they circumvented the complications by adopting each other's children (or having the husband adopt the wife's children from a previous marriage). Thus, customary inheritance laws enhanced and facilitated the economic and social blending of families.

==== From egalitarianism to preferential treatment ====
The general historiographic consensus based on case studies in Quebec is that egalitarian inheritance practices, as stipulated in the Custom of Paris, were observed in the early period of the colony in the 16th and the 17th centuries. However, by the mid-18th century, there were various qualifications favouring preferential treatment.

===== 16th and 17th centuries =====
In the early settlement of New France, settlers would practice equality of the division of property post mortem in its purest form so they were frequently more egalitarian than what the Custom prescribed. Between the 17th and the 18th centuries, qualifiers such as inter vivos gifts, dowries, and wills were rare. Wills were primarily a form of demonstrating religious piety through their spiritual rhetoric, as opposed to temporal concerns for the division of property.

Equitable settlements stemmed from a familial interest in preventing an excessive fragmentation of land.

During this period of early settlement, families profited from the abundance of virgin land and frequently purchased vast plots with the intention of providing for their offspring post mortem. Despite the fact that many plots remained unfarmed during the parents’ lifetime, farmers were willing to pay their feudal incidents for the land.

At this time, the law for the equitable distribution of land among both female and male offspring was observed so girls received their due portion of the estate in conjunction with their allocation of movable assets. Egalitarianism took on many forms so if children did not receive an inheritance of land, they would be compensated with additional movable assets.

===== 18th century =====
The 18th century marked a progressive shift from egalitarian practices to more discriminatory forms of inheritance. French Canadians increasingly used inter vivos gifts to transfer land to a single heir before death. They thus were able to circumvent the division of the property post mortem. That led to inequality among heirs, and most inheritances by the 19th century did not provide compensation for those disadvantaged.

The shift from an egalitarian system to inequality was motivated by numerous factors including the introduction of English freedom of testation in 1774, the development of the grain market, and the increased bond between man and land. The rise of rural population density was a major catalyst of this shift, as it led to the saturation of land so that familial interests shifted from the preparation of all children for a productive life through individual landholdings to the preservation of the family estate. Some historians, such as Sylvie Dépatie who carried out a case study of Île Jésus, argued that rather than the changing man-to-land ratio, the primary use of inter vivos gifts stemmed from concerns for the productive capacity of property. Notably, gifts were not limited to French Canada or the jurisdiction of the Custom of Paris, and they occurred in areas that were primarily based on cultivation such as Andover, Massachusetts.

That shows a pattern of preferential treatment not in the fashion of primogeniture or ultimogeniture and suggests that the primary concern was pragmatic, the preservation of estates, but emotional considerations are assumed to have been a motivating factor. Parents tried to retain a degree of control following the conveyance of legal title to the land and property from the maintenance of younger siblings and the guarantee of their endowment upon marriage to the supply of food requirements and basic necessities for parents. Some children found the exactions so onerous that they annulled the right following a year or two. Though notaries drew up the gift deeds, they fundamentally represented the concerns and desires of the farmers.

Throughout the centuries of its existence in New France, the inheritance system under the Custom was complicated by internal family conditions. Sons who married before the death of their parents typically wanted their portion of land and would receive it by way of inter vivos gift.

== Debt recovery ==
The Custom of Paris contained four titles regarding debt collection and commercial transactions that were greatly influenced by the canon-law ban on interest-bearing loans. For instance, with the exception of rentcharges that allowed interest, notaries were forbidden to include interest charges within their contracts. Notaries played a significant role in the French legal tradition, as opposed to English practice; notaries drew up most agreements and served as mediators. Performing the function of magistrates in non-contentious matters, notaries facilitated amicable settlements through transactions, accords and désistements. Most of a notary's work concerned property law, primarily in the areas of conveyancing, inheritance, indebtedness, and investment.

Evidence of efficient notarial work that prevented civil conflict is found in the fact that few cases concerning real property went to courts; typically, such issues were resolved between the parties.

In order to encourage business within the colony, movable property could not be mortgaged under the Custom. In cases of bankruptcy, certain creditors held a statutory preference (preferential creditors) including women, officers of the court, and feudal lords. Depending on the object and extent of indebtedness, debt claims had to be filed within a given amount of time. Debts were secured by all the debtor's property.

When lawsuits led to a court order to recover debts, creditors had three options for lawful seizure in cases of debts in default:

- attachment (saisie-exécution) – involving the seizure of movables;
- foreclosure (saisie réelle) – passing the sale of land to a public auctioneer; and
- sequestration (saisie-arrêt), in which property or money was taken into custody by a third party pending a court trial.

== Application ==
The Custom of Paris was understood to apply to all of the French colonies of the Ancien Régime including the French West Indies and America. The application of the Custom of Paris in the territories of New France varied periodically, as France lost and won back colonies. At its peak, the Custom applied to the colonies of Canada, Acadia, Newfoundland, Louisiana, and Île Royale. The Custom was practiced in the St. Lawrence Valley in the colony of Canada. To the east, the Superior Councils of Louisburg and Cape Breton, like those of the southern colonies of New Orleans and Louisiana, observed the same body of law. The absence of comparably formal administrative structures in continental Acadia and the western fur-trading territories led to a different pattern of legal development in these areas. English common law was practiced in the adjacent territories of New England.

The French West India Company envisioned a system of judicial unity within a framework of institutional diversity that was to be facilitated by the judges in all the colonies. The Company wanted judges in the colonies to observe the Custom of Paris. Given the nature of the 17th and 18th-century governance and arbitration, there was considerable regional variation within the practice of the law, even within a colony. From 1665, the colony's governor-general controlled foreign relations and the military, while the intendant and the Sovereign Councils of Quebec and Louisbourg operated as judicial bodies, among other things.

The Custom of Paris was not a comprehensive body of law, as its provisions did not deal with commerce or criminal law. In those areas that the Custom of Paris did not cover, judges were free to interpret any custom that they felt best relevant, although, in theory, the jus commune was meant to prevail. The flexibility of judicial interpretation was qualified by the Ordinance of 1673, also known as the "Savary Code", that regulated commercial law, and the Criminal Ordinance of 1670.

== Legacy ==
After the conquest of New France by the British, the Royal Proclamation of 1763 introduced English common law in the former French colony. The new French Canadian subjects that Britain had just acquired were reluctant to accept this reality, and the Royal Proclamation of 1764 subsequently allowed for French law to be used in legal business between natives of New France.

However, French Canadians continued to protest even that, particularly by continuing to use notaries to handle their legal affairs, as it had been done under the Custom of Paris. In 1774, wary of the rebellion brewing in the Thirteen Colonies, the British sought to appease French Canadians and co-opt their support by the provisions of the Quebec Act, which reinstated French private law pertaining to property and civil rights (the Custom of Paris) by allowing "Canadians" to cite the "laws and customs of Canada". The Quebec Act thereby contributed to the survival in Canada of French civil law under the Custom of Paris while affirming the overarching influence of English common law and its hegemony in criminal matters.

The partition of the colony into Upper Canada (largely English) and Lower Canada (largely French) in the Constitutional Act 1791 ensured the constitutional survival of French civil law in Canada. Even after the adoption of the Act of Union (which affirmed that the law of each Canadian province would remain in force unless amended by a law of the United Canadas) in 1840, legislators preserved the civil law tradition in Lower Canada (then known as Canada East). Among the reforms undertaken after 1840 was the codification of laws governing private law in Canada East, which had over the years moved away from historic French customary law (the tenets of the Custom of Paris as applied in New France) to better meet the changing needs of the French Canadian population, and had also incorporated elements of English common law. The result of the project, the Civil Code of Lower Canada, came into force in 1866, and the Code of Civil Procedure followed it in 1867. The codes symbolically confirmed that Quebec belonged to a civil law tradition with roots in the Custom of Paris, and the province is unique in Canadian history in entering into Canadian Confederation with a codified private law and a system of civil law statutes.

Thus, the legacy of the Custom of Paris in New France is that its evolved successor, Quebec's modern system of civil private law, laid the foundation for Canadian bijuralism, which has been a distinct and important feature of justice in Canada since its inception.

== Bibliography ==
- Brun, Josette (2000). Le Veuvage en Nouvelle-France : Genre, dynamique familiale et stratégies de survie dans deux villes coloniales du XVIII^{e} siècle, Québec et Louisbourg (Ph.D.). Montreal: Université De Montréal. ISBN 0-612-57459-8.
- Dechêne, Louise (1992). Habitants and Merchants in Seventeenth-century Montreal. Montreal: McGill-Queen's University Press. ISBN 0-7735-0658-6.
- Dépatie, Sylvie (1990). "La transmission du patrimoine dans les terroirs en expansion : un exemple canadien au XVIIIe siècle". Revue d'histoire de l'Amérique française. 44 (2). Institut d'histoire de l'Amérique française: 171–198. doi:10.7202/304878ar. ISSN 1492-1383.
- Dickinson, John A. (1995). "New France: Law, Courts, and the Coutume De Paris, 1608-1760". Manitoba Law Journal. 23: 32.
- Gilles, David (2002). "La condition juridique de la femme en Nouvelle-France: essai sur l'application de la Coutume de Paris dans un contexte colonial". Cahiers aixois d'histoire des droits de l'outre-mer français. 11. Aix-en-Provence: PUAM: 77–125.
- Greer, Allan (1985). Peasant, Lord, and Merchant : Rural Society in Three Quebec Parishes, 1740-1840. Toronto: University of Toronto Press. ISBN 0-8020-6578-3.
- Munro, William B. (1909). « The custom of Paris in the New World », excerpted from Juristische Festgabe des Auslandes zu Joseph Kohlers 60. Geburtstag
- Pue, W. Wesley; Guth, DeLloyd J., eds. (2001). Canada's Legal Inheritances. Winnipeg: Canadian Legal History Project, Faculty of Law, University of Manitoba. ISBN 0-96845602-2.
- Zoltvany, Yves F. (1971). "Esquisse de la Coutume de Paris". Revue d'histoire de l'Amérique française. 25 (3). Institut d'histoire de l'Amérique française: 365. doi:10.7202/303092ar. ISSN 1492-1383.
