= George Okill Stuart Jr. =

Canadian lawyer, political figure and judge

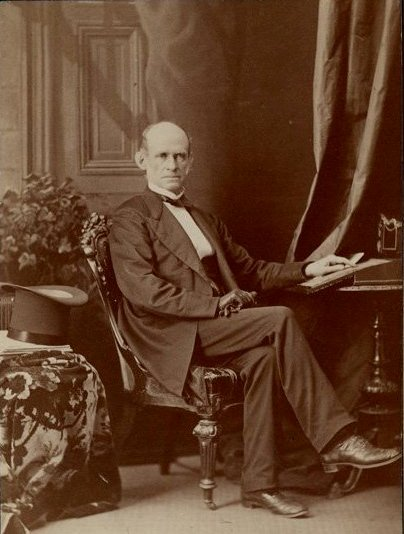
- Stuart c. 1890

3rd Mayor of Quebec City
- In office 9 February 1846 – 11 February 1850
- Preceded by: René-Édouard Caron
- Succeeded by: Narcisse-Fortunat Belleau

Personal details
- Born: October 12, 1807 Toronto, Upper Canada, British Empire
- Died: March 5, 1884 (aged 76) Quebec City, Quebec, Canada
- Resting place: Mount Hermon Cemetery, Sillery, Quebec
- Parent: George Stuart

George Okill Stuart QC (October 12, 1807 – March 5, 1884) was a Canadian lawyer, political figure, and judge.

He was born in (York, later Toronto), Upper Canada in 1807, the son of George Okill Stuart and was educated at Kingston and Quebec City. He articled in law with his uncle, James Stuart, and was admitted to the Lower Canada Bar in 1830. He entered practice with his uncle from 1834 until 1838, when his uncle became chief justice for Lower Canada. Stuart served as solicitor for the city of Quebec from 1841 to 1843. In 1843, he was elected to city council and he served as mayor from 1846 to 1850. In 1851, he was elected to the Legislative Assembly of the Province of Canada for Quebec City as an independent Conservative. He was defeated in 1854 but reelected in an 1857 by-election. Stuart was bâtonnier for the bar of Lower Canada from 1851 to 1853. In 1854, he was named Queen's Counsel. He was an assistant judge in the Superior Court of Lower Canada for a short time in 1855. Stuart served as a director for the Saint Maurice Railway and Navigation Company. He started a law firm with John Murphy around 1861 that operated until 1873. In 1873, he became an assistant to his wife’s uncle, Henry Black, a judge in the Vice Admiralty Court at Quebec. When Black died later that year, Stuart was chosen as his replacement and served in that function until his death at Quebec City in 1884.

Stuart also published a volume of case reports from the courts of King's Bench, the provincial Court of Appeals of Lower Canada and the Court of Vice Admiralty and edited another work on cases related to maritime law.
