= 15th Parliament of Lower Canada =

Parliament of Lower Canada 1835–1838

The 15th Parliament of Lower Canada was in session from March 21, 1835, to March 27, 1838. Elections to the Legislative Assembly in Lower Canada had been held in October 1834. The lower house was dissolved following the Lower Canada Rebellion and Lower Canada was administered by an appointed Special Council until the Act of Union in 1840 established a new lower chamber for the Province of Canada. All sessions were held at Quebec City.

The 15th Parliament of Lower Canada was elected in 1834. The general election of 1834 allowed voters of Lower Canada to choose 88 deputies, spread over a total of 46 constituencies—four single-member districts (Magantic, Drummond, Montmorency and William-Henry) and 42 two-seat districts.

== Members ==
Riding	Member	First elected / previously elected	No. of terms
Beauce	Antoine-Charles Taschereau	1830	2nd term
Beauce	Pierre-Elzéar Taschereau (Note: resigned in November 1835; Joseph-André Taschereau was elected in a by-election held in December 1835.)	1830	2nd term
Beauce	Joseph-André Taschereau (1835)	1835	1st term
Beauharnois	Charles Archambault	1830	2nd term
Beauharnois	Jacob De Witt	1830	2nd term
Bellechasse	Augustin-Norbert Morin	1830	2nd term
Bellechasse	Nicolas Boissonnault	1830	2nd term
Berthier	Alexis Mousseau	1820, 1827	5th term*
Berthier	Jacques Deligny (Note: died in January 1837; Norbert Éno was elected in a by-election held in March 1837.)	1820	6th term
Berthier	Norbert Éno (1837)	1837	1st term
Bonaventure	Édouard Thibaudeau (Note: died in August 1836; James McCracken was elected in a by-election held in December 1836.)	1830	2nd term
Bonaventure	James McCracken (1836)	1836	1st term
Bonaventure	Joseph-François Deblois	1834	1st term
Chambly	Louis Lacoste	1834	1st term
Chambly	Louis-Michel Viger	1830	2nd term
Champlain	Olivier Trudel	1830	2nd term
Champlain	Pierre-Antoine Dorion	1830	2nd term
Deux-Montagnes	William Henry Scott	1829	3rd term
Deux-Montagnes	Jean-Joseph Girouard	1831	2nd term
Dorchester	Jean-Baptiste Beaudoin	1834	1st term
Dorchester	Jean Bouffard	1832	2nd term
Drummond (Note: second seat added in 1836)	Edward Toomy	1833	2nd term
Drummond	Henry Menut (1836)	1836	1st term
Gaspé	John Le Boutillier	1833	2nd term
Gaspé	William Power	1832	2nd term
Kamouraska	Amable Dionne (Note: resigned in May 1835; Alexandre Fraser was elected in a by-election held in June 1835.)	1830	2nd term
Kamouraska	Alexandre Fraser (1835)	1835	1st term
Kamouraska	Pierre Canac, dit Marquis	1834	1st term
L'Acadie	Merritt Hotchkiss	1834	1st term
L'Acadie	Cyrille-Hector-Octave Côté	1834	1st term
Lachenaie	Charles Courteau	1824, 1830	3rd term*
Lachenaie	Jean-Marie Rochon (Note: Died in February 1837; Ludger Duvernay was elected in a by-election held in May 1837.)	1830	2nd term
Lachenaie	Ludger Duvernay (1837)	1837	1st term
Laprairie	Jean-Moïse Raymond	1824	4th term
Laprairie	Joseph-Narcisse Cardinal	1834	1st term
L'Assomption	Édouard-Étienne Rodier	1832	2nd term
L'Assomption	Jean-Baptiste Meilleur	1834	1st term
L'Islet	Jean-Baptiste Fortin	1820	6th term
L'Islet	Jean-Charles Létourneau	1827	3rd term
Lotbinière	Louis Méthot	1830	2nd term
Lotbinière	Jean-Baptiste-Isaïe Noël	1830	2nd term
Mégantic	John Greaves Clapham	1834	1st term
Missisquoi	Ephraim Knight	1834	1st term
Missisquoi	William Baker	1834	1st term
Montmorency	Elzéar Bédard (Note: resigned to accept a position as judge in February 1836; Nicolas Lefrançois was elected in a by-election held in March 1836.)	1832	2nd term
Montmorency	Nicolas Lefrançois (1836)	1836	1st term
Montmorency	Vital Têtu (1836)	1836	1st term
Montreal County	Côme-Séraphin Cherrier	1834	1st term
Montreal County	Louis-Joseph Papineau (Note: Resigned immediately. Papineau was elected in Montreal County and Montreal West, choosing to represent the latter; André Jobin was elected in a by-election held in November 1835.)	1808	11th term
Montreal County	André Jobin (1835)	1835	1st term
Montreal East	Joseph Roy	1834	1st term
Montreal East	James Leslie	1824	4th term
Montreal West	Louis-Joseph Papineau	1808	11th term
Montreal West	Robert Nelson	1834	1st term
Nicolet	Jean-Baptiste Proulx	1820	5th term
Nicolet	Louis Bourdages (Note: died in January 1835; Jean-Baptiste Hébert was elected in a by-election held in April 1835.)	1804, (Note: Richelieu) 1815	12th term*
Nicolet	Jean-Baptiste Hébert (1835)	1835	1st term
Orléans	Alexis Godbout	1834	1st term
Orléans	Jean-Baptiste Cazeau	1830	2nd term
Ottawa	Baxter Bowman	1834	1st term
Ottawa	James Blackburn	1834	1st term
Portneuf	Hector-Simon Huot	1830	2nd term
Portneuf	François-Xavier Larue	1826	4th term
Quebec County	Louis-Théodore Besserer	1833	2nd term
Quebec County	Jean Blanchet	1834	1st term
Quebec (Lower Town)	George Vanfelson (Note: resigned his seat in June 1837; John Munn was elected in a by-election held in July 1837.)	1832	2nd term
Quebec (Lower Town)	John Munn (1837)	1837	1st term
Quebec (Lower Town)	Hippolyte Dubord	1834	1st term
Quebec (Upper Town)	René-Édouard Caron (Note: resigned in March 1836; Andrew Stuart was elected in a by-election held in March 1836.)	1834	1st term
Quebec (Upper Town)	Andrew Stuart (1836)	1814, 1820, 1824, 1836	7th term*
Quebec (Upper Town)	Amable Berthelot	1814, (Note: Trois-Rivières) 1824, 1834	3rd term*
Richelieu	Clément-Charles Sabrevois de Bleury (Note: resigned his seat in August 1837 after being appointed to Legislative Council)	1832	2nd term
Richelieu	Jacques Dorion	1830	2nd term
Rimouski	Jean-Baptiste Taché	1820, 1834	3rd term*
Rimouski	Louis Bertrand	1832	2nd term
Rouville	Pierre-Martial Bardy	1834	1st term
Rouville	Pierre Careau	1833	2nd term
Saguenay	François-Xavier Tessier (Note: died in December 1835; Charles Drolet was elected in a by-election held in February 1836.)	1833	2nd term
Saguenay	Charles Drolet (1836)	1836	1st term
Saguenay	André Cimon	1832	2nd term
Saint-Hyacinthe	Thomas Boutillier	1834	1st term
Saint-Hyacinthe	Louis Raynaud, dit Blanchard	1834	1st term
Saint-Maurice	Valère Guillet (Note: resigned in June 1836; François Lesieur Desaulniers was elected in a by-election held in August 1836.)	1830	2nd term
Saint-Maurice	François Lesieur Desaulniers (1836)	1836	1st term
Saint-Maurice	Pierre Bureau (1836) (Note: died in June 1836; Alexis Bareil, dit Lajoie was elected in a by-election held in August 1836.)	1819	7th term
Saint-Maurice	Alexis Bareil, dit Lajoie (1836)	1836	1st term
Shefford	Alphonso Wells	1834	1st term
Shefford	Samuel Wood	1832	2nd term
Sherbrooke	John Moore	1834	1st term
Sherbrooke	Bartholomew Gugy	1834	1st term
Stanstead	John Grannis (Note: resigned in October 1836; Moses French Colby was elected in a by-election held in January 1837.)	1834	1st term
Stanstead	Moses French Colby (1837)	1837	1st term
Stanstead	Marcus Child	1829, 1834	2nd term*
Terrebonne	Séraphin Bouc (Note: died in July 1837; André-Benjamin Papineau was elected in a by-election held in September 1837.)	1834	1st term
Terrebonne	André-Benjamin Papineau (1837)	1837	1st term
Terrebonne	Louis-Hippolyte Lafontaine	1830	2nd term
Trois-Rivières	Edward Barnard	1834	1st term
Trois-Rivières	René-Joseph Kimber	1834	1st term
Vaudreuil	Charles-Ovide Perrault	1834	1st term
Vaudreuil	Charles Rocbrune, dit Larocque	1833	2nd term
Verchères	Pierre Amiot	1813	9th term
Verchères	Joseph-Toussaint Drolet	1832	2nd term
William-Henry	John Pickel	1834	1st term
Yamaska	Edmund Bailey O'Callaghan	1834	1st term
Yamaska	Léonard Godefroy de Tonnancour	1832	2nd term
