= 14th Parliament of Lower Canada =

Parliament of Lower Canada 1831–1834

The 14th Parliament of Lower Canada was in session from January 21, 1831, to October 9, 1834. Elections to the Legislative Assembly in Lower Canada had been held in October 1830. The Ninety-Two Resolutions were submitted to the legislative assembly in 1834. All sessions were held at Quebec City.

== Members ==
| Riding | Member | First elected / previously elected | No. of terms |
|---|---|---|---|
| Beauce (Note: formerly part of Dorchester) | Antoine-Charles Taschereau | 1830 | 1st term |
| Beauce | Pierre-Elzéar Taschereau | 1830 | 1st term |
| Beauharnois (Note: formerly part of Huntingdon) | Charles Archambault | 1830 | 1st term |
| Beauharnois | Jacob De Witt | 1830 | 1st term |
| Bellechasse (Note: formerly Hertford) | Augustin-Norbert Morin | 1830 | 1st term |
| Bellechasse | Nicolas Boissonnault | 1830 | 1st term |
| Berthier (Note: formerly Warwick) | Alexis Mousseau | 1820, 1827 | 4th term* |
| Berthier | Jacques Deligny | 1820 | 5th term |
| Bonaventure (Note: formerly part of Gaspé) | Édouard Thibaudeau | 1830 | 1st term |
| Bonaventure | John Gosset (Note: resigned his seat in November 1832; John Robinson Hamilton was elected in a by-election held in December 1832.) | 1830 | 1st term |
| Bonaventure | John Robinson Hamilton (1832) | 1832 | 1st term |
| Chambly (Note: formerly Kent) | Frédéric-Auguste Quesnel | 1820 | 4th term |
| Chambly | Louis-Michel Viger | 1830 | 1st term |
| Champlain (Note: created in 1830) | Olivier Trudel | 1830 | 1st term |
| Champlain | Pierre-Antoine Dorion | 1830 | 1st term |
| Deux-Montagnes (Note: formerly part of York) | William Henry Scott | 1829 | 2nd term |
| Deux-Montagnes | Jacques Labrie (Note: died in October 1831; Jean-Joseph Girouard was elected in a by-election held in December 1831.) | 1827 | 2nd term |
| Deux-Montagnes | Jean-Joseph Girouard (1831) | 1831 | 1st term |
| Dorchester | Henry John Caldwell | 1830 | 1st term |
| Dorchester | Louis Lagueux (Note: died in June 1832; Jean Bouffard was elected in a by-election held in August 1832.) | 1827 | 2nd term |
| Dorchester | Jean Bouffard (1832) | 1832 | 1st term |
| Drummond | Frederick George Heriot (Note: resigned his seat in 1833; Edward Toomy was elected in a by-election held in March 1833.) | 1829 | 2nd term |
| Drummond | Edward Toomy (1833) | 1833 | 1st term |
| Gaspé (Note: second seat added in 1832) | Robert Christie (Note: expelled in January 1831, reelected in March 1831, expelled in November 1831, reelected in April 1832 and expelled in November 1832; John Le Boutillier was elected in a by-election held in March 1833.) | 1827 | 2nd term |
| Gaspé | John Le Boutillier (1833) | 1833 | 1st term |
| Gaspé | William Power (1832) | 1832 | 1st term |
| Kamouraska (Note: formerly part of Cornwallis) | Amable Dionne | 1830 | 1st term |
| Kamouraska | Charles-Eusèbe Casgrain | 1830 | 1st term |
| L'Acadie | Robert Hoyle | 1830 | 1st term |
| L'Acadie | François Languedoc | 1830 | 1st term |
| Lachenaie (Note: formerly part of Leinster) | Charles Courteau | 1824, 1830 | 2nd term* |
| Lachenaie | Jean-Marie Rochon | 1830 | 1st term |
| Laprairie | Jean-Moïse Raymond | 1824 | 3rd term |
| Laprairie | Austin Cuvillier | 1814 | 7th term |
| L'Assomption | Barthélemy Joliette (Note: resigned in June 1832 to become a member of the Legislative Council; Édouard-Étienne Rodier was elected in a by-election held in August 1832.) | 1830 | 1st term |
| L'Assomption | Édouard-Étienne Rodier (1832) | 1832 | 1st term |
| L'Assomption | Amable Éno, dit Deschamps | 1830 | 1st term |
| L'Islet (Note: formerly Devon) | Jean-Baptiste Fortin | 1820 | 5th term |
| L'Islet | Jean-Charles Létourneau | 1827 | 2nd term |
| Lotbinière (Note: formerly part of Buckinghamshire) | Louis Méthot | 1830 | 1st term |
| Lotbinière | Jean-Baptiste-Isaïe Noël | 1830 | 1st term |
| Mégantic (Note: created in 1832, formerly part of Buckinghamshire) | Anthony Anderson (1832) | 1832 | 1st term |
| Missisquoi | Ralph Taylor | 1830 | 1st term |
| Missisquoi | Stevens Baker | 1830 | 1st term |
| Montmorency (Note: formerly part of Northumberland) | Philippe Panet (Note: resigned his seat to accept an appointment as judge in July 1832; Elzéar Bédard was elected in a by-election held in the same month.) | 1830 | 1st term |
| Montmorency | Elzéar Bédard (1832) | 1832 | 1st term |
| Montreal County | Joseph Valois | 1820 | 5th term |
| Montreal County | Joseph Perrault (Note: died in August 1831; Dominique Mondelet was elected in a by-election held in October 1831, but his seat was declared vacant in November 1832 after he was named to the Executive Council.) | 1820 | 5th term |
| Montreal County | Dominique Mondelet (1831) | 1831 | 1st term |
| Montreal East | Hugues Heney (Note: resigned his seat in February 1832; Antoine-Olivier Berthelet was elected in a by-election held in April 1832.) | 1820 | 5th term |
| Montreal East | Antoine-Olivier Berthelet (1832) | 1832 | 1st term |
| Montreal East | James Leslie | 1824 | 3rd term |
| Montreal West | Louis-Joseph Papineau | 1808 | 10th term |
| Montreal West | John Fisher (Note: resigned in March 1832; Daniel Tracey was elected in a by-election held in May 1832 but died in July 1832.) | 1830 | 1st term |
| Montreal West | Daniel Tracey (1832) | 1832 | 1st term |
| Nicolet | Jean-Baptiste Proulx | 1820 | 4th term |
| Nicolet | Louis Bourdages | 1804, (Note: Richelieu) 1815 | 11th term* |
| Orléans (Note: second seat added in 1830) | François Quirouet (Note: named to the Legislative Council in October 1833; Alexis Godbout was elected in a by-election held in February 1834.) | 1820 | 5th term |
| Orléans | Alexis Godbout (1834) | 1834 | 1st term |
| Orléans | Jean-Baptiste Cazeau | 1830 | 1st term |
| Ottawa | Philemon Wright | 1830 | 1st term |
| Ottawa | Theodore Davis (1832) | 1832 | 1st term |
| Portneuf (Note: formerly Hampshire) | Hector-Simon Huot | 1830 | 1st term |
| Portneuf | François-Xavier Larue | 1826 | 3rd term |
| Quebec County | Michel Clouet (Note: resigned due to health problems in August 1833; Louis-Théodore Besserer was elected in a by-election held in October 1833.) | 1822 | 4th term |
| Quebec County | Louis-Théodore Besserer (1833) | 1833 | 1st term |
| Quebec County | John Neilson | 1820 | 5th term |
| Quebec (Lower Town) | Thomas Lee (Note: died in August 1832; George Vanfelson was elected in a by-election held in September 1832.) | 1809, (Note: Northumberland) 1820, (Note: Quebec (Lower Town)) 1828 | 6th term* |
| Quebec (Lower Town) | George Vanfelson (1832) | 1832 | 1st term |
| Quebec (Lower Town) | Thomas Ainslie Young | 1824 | 3rd term |
| Quebec (Upper Town) | Andrew Stuart | 1814, 1820, 1824 | 5th term* |
| Quebec (Upper Town) | Jean-François-Joseph Duval | 1829 | 2nd term |
| Richelieu | François-Roch de Saint-Ours (Note: resigned to become a member of the Legislative Council in July 1832; Clément-Charles Sabrevois de Bleury was elected in a by-election held in August 1832.) | 1824 | 3rd term |
| Richelieu | Clément-Charles Sabrevois de Bleury (1832) | 1832 | 1st term |
| Richelieu | Jacques Dorion | 1830 | 1st term |
| Rimouski | Paschal Dumais (Note: The election in Rimouski was declared invalid in December 1831; a by-election was held in February 1832.) | 1830 | 1st term |
| Rimouski | Alexis Rivard (1832) | 1832 | 1st term |
| Rimouski | François Corneau | 1830 | 1st term |
| Rimouski | Louis Bertrand (1832) | 1832 | 1st term |
| Rouville (Note: formerly Bedford) | Jean-Baptiste-René Hertel de Rouville (Note: resigned due to poor health in November 1832; Théophile Lemay was elected in a by-election in December 1832.) | 1824 | 3rd term |
| Rouville | Théophile Lemay (1832) | 1832 | 1st term |
| Rouville | Rémi-Séraphin Bourdages (Note: died in December 1832; François Rainville was elected in a by-election held in February 1833.) | 1830 | 1st term |
| Rouville | François Rainville (1833) (Note: died in September 1833; Pierre Careau was elected in a by-election held in November 1833.) | 1833 | 1st term |
| Rouville | Pierre Careau (1833) | 1833 | 1st term |
| Saguenay | Joseph-Isidore Bédard (Note: died in April 1833; François-Xavier Tessier was elected in a by-election held in October 1833.) | 1830 | 1st term |
| Saguenay | François-Xavier Tessier (1833) | 1833 | 1st term |
| Saguenay | Marc-Pascal de Sales Laterrière (Note: named to the Legislative Council in September 1832; André Cimon was elected in a by-election held in October 1832.) | 1830 | 1st term |
| Saguenay | André Cimon (1832) | 1832 | 1st term |
| Saint-Hyacinthe (Note: formerly part of Richelieu) | Jean Dessaulles (Note: resigned his seat in June 1832 after he was named to the Legislative Council; Louis Poulin was elected in a by-election held in July 1832.) | 1816 | 6th term |
| Saint-Hyacinthe | Louis Poulin (1832) | 1832 | 1st term |
| Saint-Hyacinthe | Louis Raynaud, dit Blanchard | 1830 | 1st term |
| Saint-Maurice | Valère Guillet | 1830 | 1st term |
| Saint-Maurice | Pierre Bureau | 1819 | 6th term |
| Shefford | Paul Holland Knowlton | 1830 | 1st term |
| Shefford | Samuel Wood (1832) | 1832 | 1st term |
| Sherbrooke | Samuel Brooks (Note: resigned in July 1831 because he was not a British subject; Bartholomew Conrad Augustus Gugy was elected in a by-election held in September 1831.) | 1829 | 2nd term |
| Sherbrooke | Bartholomew Conrad Augustus Gugy (1831) | 1831 | 1st term |
| Sherbrooke | Charles Frederick Henry Goodhue | 1830 | 1st term |
| Stanstead | Ebenezer Peck | 1829 | 2nd term |
| Stanstead | James Baxter (Note: resigned in February 1833 to become a member of the Legislative Council; Wright Chamberlin was elected in a by-election held in March 1833.) | 1830 | 1st term |
| Stanstead | Wright Chamberlin (1833) (Note: Marcus Child was declared elected after the results of the 1833 by-election were overturned.) | 1833 | 1st term |
| Stanstead | Marcus Child (1834) | 1834 | 1st term |
| Terrebonne (Note: formerly Effingham) | Joseph-Ovide Turgeon | 1824 | 3rd term |
| Terrebonne | Louis-Hippolyte Lafontaine | 1830 | 1st term |
| Trois-Rivières | Charles Richard Ogden (Note: resigned his seat in January 1833 to become attorney general; Jean Desfossés was elected in a by-election held in February 1833.) | 1814, 1826 | 7th term* |
| Trois-Rivières | Jean Desfossés (1833) | 1833 | 1st term |
| Trois-Rivières | Pierre-Benjamin Dumoulin (Note: resigned his seat in October 1832; René-Joseph Kimber was elected in a by-election held in December 1832.) | 1827 | 2nd term |
| Trois-Rivières | René-Joseph Kimber (1832) | 1832 | 1st term |
| Vaudreuil | Godefroy Beaudet (Note: resigned in October 1831; Paul-Timothée Masson was elected in a by-election held in December 1831.) | 1830 | 1st term |
| Vaudreuil | Paul-Timothée Masson (1831) | 1831 | 1st term |
| Vaudreuil | Alexis Demers (Note: died in January 1833; Charles Rocbrune dit Larocque was elected in a by-election held in February 1833.) | 1830 | 1st term |
| Vaudreuil | Charles Rocbrune, dit Larocque (1833) | 1833 | 1st term |
| Verchères (Note: formerly Surrey) | Pierre Amiot | 1813 | 8th term |
| Verchères | François-Xavier Malhiot (Note: resigned to become a member of the Legislative Council in June 1832; Joseph-Toussaint Drolet was elected in a by-election held in July 1832.) | 1815, 1828 | 3rd term* |
| Verchères | Joseph-Toussaint Drolet (1832) | 1832 | 1st term |
| William-Henry | Jonathan Würtele | 1830 | 1st term |
| Yamaska | Joseph Badeaux | 1808, (Note: Trois-Rivières) 1816, 1820, 1830 | 5th term* |
| Yamaska | Charles-Nicolas-Fortuné de Montenach (Note: died in May 1832; Léonard Godefroy de Tonnancour was elected in a by-election held in August 1832.) | 1830 | 1st term |
| Yamaska | Léonard Godefroy de Tonnancour (1832) | 1832 | 1st term |
