= Hoyle =

- Pronunciation: English: /ˈhɔɪl/
- Language: English

Origin
- Language: English
- Meaning: Someone who lived in, or by, a hollow
- Region of origin: England

Other names
- Variant forms: Hoile, Hoyles, Hoiles

Hoyle is an English surname. Notable people with the surname include:

- Arthur Hoyle (1922–2012), Australian historian and biographer
- Bert Hoyle (1920–2003), English footballer
- Colin Hoyle (born 1972), English footballer
- David Hoyle (performance artist) (born 1962), British performance artist
- David W. Hoyle (1939–2023), North Carolina politician
- Dean Hoyle (born 1967), British businessman
- Doug Hoyle (1926–2024), British politician
- Edmond Hoyle (1672–1769), compiler of rules of card games
- Sir Fred Hoyle (1915–2001), British astronomer and science fiction writer
- Geoff Hoyle (born 1945), British actor
- Geoffrey Hoyle (born 1942), English science fiction writer, son of Sir Fred Hoyle
- Henry Hoyle (1852–1926), Australian politician and rugby league football administrator
- Isaac Hoyle (1828–1911), British mill owner and politician
- Jacob Hoyle (born 1994), American Olympic fencer
- Jonas Hoyl (1834–1906), American politician
- Joshua Hoyle (died 1654), English theologian
- Katie Hoyle (born 1988), New Zealand footballer
- Sir Lindsay Hoyle (born 1957), British politician and current Speaker of the House of Commons
- Mark Hoyle (born 1987), British YouTuber known as LadBaby
- Rebecca Hoyle, British mathematician
- Robert Hoyle (1781–1857), British businessman and politician
- Stephen Hoyle (born 1992), English footballer
- Theodore Hoyle (1884–1953), English cricketer
- Trevor Hoyle (born 1940), English science fiction writer
- William Hoyle (disambiguation)

== See also ==
- Hoyle Casino, a computer casino simulation game, named for Edmond Hoyle
- Hoyle Card Games, a computer game, also named for Edmond Hoyle
- United States Playing Card Company, owners of the "Hoyle" brand for playing cards
