= Drolet =

Drolet is a surname. Notable people with the surname include:

- Adine Fafard-Drolet (1876–1963), Canadian singer and founder of a conservatory
- André Drolet (born 1954), politician in the Canadian province of Quebec
- Antoine Drolet (born 1940), politician in Quebec, Canada and a Member of the National Assembly of Quebec
- Charles Drolet (1795–1873), Quebec lawyer and political figure
- François Drolet (born 1972), Canadian short track speed skater
- Joseph-Toussaint Drolet (1786–1838), merchant, seigneur and political figure in Lower Canada
- Leon Drolet (born 1967), Michigan Republican politician and political activist with libertarian views
- Marie-Ève Drolet (born 1982), Canadian short track speed skater
- Michele Drolet, American cross-country skier
- Nancy Drolet (born 1973), Canadian ice hockey player
- René Drolet (born 1944), retired Canadian professional ice hockey centre

== See also ==
- Lac-Drolet, Quebec, village of 1,100 people in Le Granit Regional County Municipality in the Estrie region in Quebec, Canada
