= Augustin-Norbert Morin =

Lower Canada lawyer, politician and judge

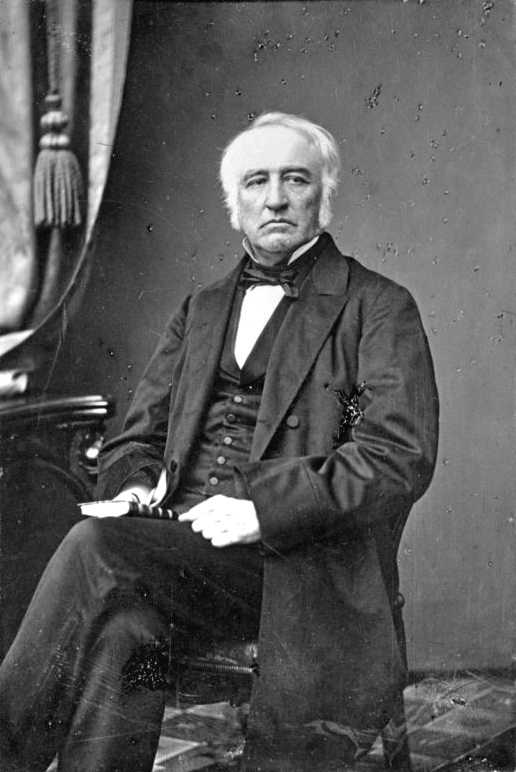

Joint Premier of the Province of Canada for Canada East
- In office 1851 – 1855 (two elections: 1851, 1854) Serving with: Francis Hincks (1851–1854); Allan MacNab (1854–1855)
- Monarch: Victoria
- Governors General: Earl of Elgin; Sir Edmund Walker Head
- Preceded by: Louis-Hippolyte LaFontaine
- Succeeded by: Étienne-Paschal Taché

Commissioner of Crown Lands
- In office October 13, 1842 – December 11, 1843
- Preceded by: Jonathan Davidson
- Succeeded by: Office vacant until September 3, 1844

Speaker of the Legislative Assembly of the Province of Canada
- In office 1848–1851
- Preceded by: Allan MacNab
- Succeeded by: John Sandfield Macdonald

Member of the Legislative Assembly of Lower Canada for Bellechasse (two-member constituency)
- In office 1830 – 1838 (two elections and one by-election) Serving with Nicolas Boissonnault
- Preceded by: François Blanchet; Nicolas Boissonnault
- Succeeded by: None; constitution suspended

Member of the Legislative Assembly of the Province of Canada for Nicolet
- In office 1841 – January 1, 1842
- Preceded by: None; new position
- Succeeded by: Louis-Michel Viger

Member of the Legislative Assembly of the Province of Canada for Saguenay
- In office 1842 – 1844 (by-election)
- Preceded by: Étienne Parent
- Succeeded by: Marc-Pascal de Sales Laterrière

Commission for the Codification of the Law of Lower Canada
- In office February 4, 1859 – July 27, 1865 Serving with René-Édouard Caron and Charles Dewey Day

Personal details
- Born: October 13, 1803 Saint-Michel-de-Bellechasse, Lower Canada
- Died: July 27, 1865 (aged 61) Sainte-Adèle, Province of Canada
- Party: Lower Canada: Parti Patriote; Province of Canada: Anti-Unionist; Groupe canadien-français; Reformer
- Spouse: Adèle Raymond
- Relations: Rémi Raymond (brother-in-law)
- Education: Petit Séminaire de Québec
- Profession: Journalist, lawyer, judge

Augustin-Norbert Morin (French pronunciation: [oɡystɛ̃ nɔʁbɛʁ mɔʁɛ̃]; October 13, 1803 – July 27, 1865) was a Canadien journalist, lawyer, politician, and rebel in Lower Canada. He was a member of the Legislative Assembly of Lower Canada in the 1830s, as a leading member of the Parti patriote. Although he participated in the Lower Canada Rebellion, the British authorities concluded his conduct did not warrant a charge of high treason. After the Rebellion, he entered politics in the Province of Canada, eventually becoming joint premier of the Province. Retiring from politics due to health concerns, Morin was appointed to the bench. He was one of the commissioners who codified the law of Lower Canada, producing the Civil Code of Lower Canada which stayed in force for over a century.

== Early life and family ==
Morin was born in 1803 in Saint-Michel-de-Bellechasse, Lower Canada, son of Augustin Morin, a farmer, and Marianne Cottin, dit Dugal. He was the eldest of eleven children, of a family that had been in Canada for seven generations. The Morin family was not well-off. The young Augustin-Norbert owed his classical education to the local parish priest, Abbé Thomas Maguire, who identified him as a boy of exceptional talent and intelligence when Augustin-Norbert was learning his catechism. Abbé Maguire arranged for Morin's education at the Petit Séminaire de Québec, beginning in 1815.

Morin grew to be a tall man, above average height, but he also developed rheumatism at a young age, which gradually grew worse as the years passed. He also had a diffident, retiring personality which masked his intellectual abilities and in some ways was ill-suited to political life. He had a talent for hard work throughout his life.

Morin did not marry until quite late in life. In 1843, at the age of forty, he married Adèle Raymond, daughter of merchant Joseph Raymond, and sister of Father Joseph-Sabin Raymond, the superior of the Séminaire de Saint-Hyacinthe. Another of her brothers, Rémi Raymond, was elected to the Legislative Assembly of the Province of Canada in 1863.

== Legal studies and journalism ==
After leaving the seminary, Morin worked as newspaperman in order to earn money for the study of law as a clerk in the office of Denis-Benjamin Viger, who in addition to being a well-recognised lawyer, was one of the leading figures in the nationalist Parti canadien. Morin also taught Latin and mathematics in order to earn money; Viger did not have a reputation of generosity towards his law clerks.

In 1826, while still an articled clerk, Morin founded his own newspaper, La Minerve, which supported the policies of the Parti canadien. Within a month he had to stop publication due to lack of subscriptions, but he was able to sell it to a more experienced newspaperman, Ludger Duvernay. La Minerve became a major newspaper supporting the nationalist policies of the Parti canadien, which came to be known as the Parti patriote. Over the next decade, even while developing his legal practice and entering politics, Morin contributed articles on a regular basis to La Minerve, on a wide range of topics.

Morin was called to the bar in 1828, and practised law in Montreal until 1836, when he transferred his practice to Quebec. By 1830 had become involved with provincial politics.

== Lower Canada: Parliament and the Rebellion ==
=== Role in Parliament ===
In 1830, at age 27, Morin was elected to the Legislative Assembly of Lower Canada to represent Bellechasse, sitting in the 14th Parliament. Morin was part of a new, younger French-Canadian contingent, along with Louis-Joseph Papineau, Charles-Ovide Perrault, and Édouard-Étienne Rodier. He was strongly critical of the British appointed governors and the appointed Legislative Council, and wanted greater access to Crown lands for French-Canadians. He was also opposed to British attempts to swamp the French-Canadians by encouraging English-speaking immigration.

Morin was also a hard worker, sitting on seven different committees, and regretfully advised Duvernay that he would not be able to produce as many articles for La Minerve. However, Morin was able to assist when Duvernay was imprisoned for articles he published in the paper, criticising the appointed Legislative Council. Morin presented a petition to the Assembly calling for Duvernay's release. There was also an episode in Morin's first term where he was accused of corrupt conduct in buying certain tracts of land. Morin resigned his seat and was promptly re-elected in the by-election, ending the criticism. He was re-elected to the 15th Parliament in the general elections of 1834.

When Morin first entered Parliament, he was a moderate supporter of the Parti canadien. However, as the political debates over the British government of the province grew more heated, by 1836 he had moved to the radical wing of the party and become a strong supporter of Papineau. He was one of the major drafters of the Ninety-Two Resolutions, which were strongly critical of the British government and the constitutional structure of Lower Canada, pariculalerly the appointed Legislative Council, dominated by the British Canadians. The Resolutions passed the Assembly by a strong majority. The Assembly then sent Morin and Viger, also a member of the Assembly, to London to explain the Resolutions and the political situation to members of the British government. Morin's work in London achieved strong praise from Papineau and the entire Assembly.

=== Role in the Rebellion ===
The British government rejected the Ninety-Two Resolutions, responding through resolutions passed by the House of Commons under the guidance of the Colonial Secretary, Lord John Russell. Events moved towards a crisis. In November, the Lower Canada Rebellion broke out, with a similar rebellion in Upper Canada. Morin was one of the major leaders of the Rebellion at Quebec, but was generally considered to be ineffective. When a warrant for his arrest issued, he took refuge in the woods near Saint-François-de-la-Rivière-du-Sud. He was arrested in October 1839 and held briefly, but the British authorities did not consider that a charge of high treason was justified. He was released without any charges.

== Province of Canada ==
Following the rebellion in Lower Canada, and the similar rebellion in Upper Canada (now Ontario), the British government decided to merge the two provinces into a single province, as recommended by Lord Durham in the Durham Report. The Union Act, 1840, passed by the British Parliament, abolished the two provinces and their separate parliaments, and created the Province of Canada, with a single Parliament for the entire province, composed of an elected Legislative Assembly and an appointed Legislative Council. The Governor General retained a strong position in the government.

In the general elections in 1841 for the first Parliament of the new Province, Morin was elected unopposed in the Nicolet constituency. At first, he had been inclined to support the union of the two Canadas because it would help to create an alliance between the reform groups in the two provinces. He ultimately opposed the union because the Act created equal representation of the two regions in the new Parliament, in spite of Lower Canada's greater population. He campaigned on an anti-union platform. In the first major vote in the Assembly, he was a co-sponsor of a motion condemning the union, which was defeated but attracted the support of all but two of the French-Canadian members. During the rest of the first session of the Parliament, he was also a consistent opponent of the government of Governor General Lord Sydenham.

On January 1, 1842, Morin resigned his seat on appointment to the district court for Rimouski, but he served on the bench for less than a year. The new governor general, Sir Charles Bagot tried to entice Morin to become the clerk of the Executive Council. Morin declined that offer, and Bagot instead suggested that Morin should be Commissioner of Crown Lands, an Executive Council position that required Morin to hold a seat in the Assembly. Morin accepted that offer. Bagot appointed the member for riding of Saguenay, Étienne Parent as the Clerk of the Executive Council, which vacated the Saguenay riding. Morin resigned from the court and was appointed Commissioner of Crown Lands and a member of the Executive Council on October 13, 1842, as a member of the 1st ministry Reform ministry of Louis-Hippolyte Lafontaine and Robert Baldwin. He was re-elected to Parliament, from the vacant Saguenay riding, in November, 1842. Back in Parliament, continued as a member of the French-Canadian group. He supported Baldwin and Lafontaine a year later in the major dispute with the new Governor General, Sir Charles Metcalfe, where all the members of the Lafontaine-Baldwin ministry resigned, except for one minister, Dominick Daly.

Morin threw himself into his work as commissioner, learning about agriculture himself, and improving agricultural education for farmers. He also considered infrastructure issues, such as roads and windmills. He personally acquired land and began to perform experiments with new agricultural methods, which he published in La Minerve and in American agricultural journals. He also founded new parishes north of Montreal: Val-Morin, Sainte-Adèle (from the name of his wife), and Morin-Heights all were begun under his auspices.

== Joint Premier of the Province of Canada ==
Morin served as Joint Premier of the Province of Canada from Canada East along with his counterparts from Canada West Francis Hincks (from October 28, 1851, to September 11, 1854), and with Allan Napier MacNab (from that date until January 27, 1855).

== Judicial career ==
He resigned from government due to ill health. However, Morin was named a judge in the Quebec Superior Court and he also took part in the commission which drafted a new civil code for Canada East.

== Legacy ==
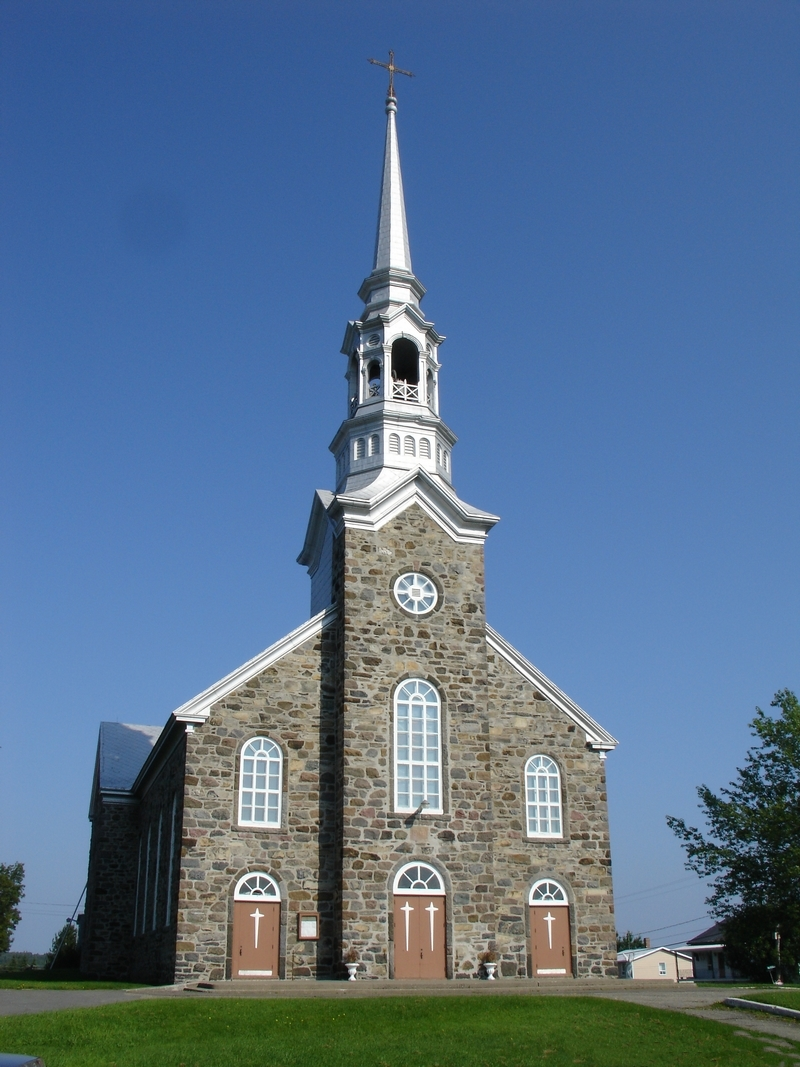
Church of Notre Dame du rosaire, where Morin's funeral took place

Morin-Heights, Quebec, and Val-Morin, Quebec, which Morin help found, are named for him. He also helped found Sainte-Adèle, Quebec, which was named after his wife Adèle Raymond, the sister of Mgr Joseph-Sabin Raymond.

He died at Sainte-Adèle in 1865.

== See also ==
- 1st Parliament of the Province of Canada
- List of presidents of the Saint-Jean-Baptiste Society of Montreal
