= Godbout (surname) =

Godbout is a surname. Notable people with the surname include:

- Adélard Godbout (1892–1956), Canadian agronomist and politician
- Alexis Godbout (1799–1887), Canadian merchant and politician
- Arthur Godbout (1872–1932), Canadian lawyer and politician
- Bill Godbout (1939–2018), American computer pioneer and entrepreneur
- François Godbout (born 1938), Canadian lawyer, sports administrator and tennis player
- Henri Godbout (born 2005), Canadian soccer player
- Henry Godbout (born 2003), American baseball player
- Jacques Godbout, CQ (born 1933), Canadian writer, journalist, filmmaker and poet
- Joseph Godbout (1850–1923), Canadian physician and politician
- Louis Godbout, Canadian film director and screenwriter
- Marc Godbout (born 1951), Canadian politician
- Marie-Marcelle Godbout (1943-2017), Canadian trans rights activist
- Michel Godbout, Canadian television news anchor
- Réal Godbout (born 1951), Canadian cartoonist

== See also ==
- Godbout (disambiguation)

Media related to Godbout (surname) at Wikimedia Commons
