= Marcus Child =

Lower Canada businessman and politician (1792–1859)

Member of the Legislative Assembly of Lower Canada for Stanstead Township
- In office November 13, 1829 – June 26, 1830 Serving with Ebenezer Peck
- Preceded by: New position
- Succeeded by: James Baxter

Member of the Legislative Assembly of Lower Canada for Stanstead Township (by-election and general elections)
- In office March 21, 1833 – March 27, 1838 Serving with: John Grannis (1835–1836); Moses French Colby (1837–1838)
- Preceded by: James Baxter
- Succeeded by: Office abolished on suspension of the constitution

Member of the Legislative Assembly of the Province of Canada for Stanstead
- In office 1841–1844
- Preceded by: New position
- Succeeded by: John McConnell

Personal details
- Born: December 1792 West Boylston, Massachusetts
- Died: March 6, 1859 (age 68) Coaticook, Canada East, Province of Canada
- Spouse: Lydia F. Chadwick
- Children: 2; 1 boy, 1 girl
- Occupation: Businessman, justice of the peace, school administrator

Marcus Child (December 1792 – March 6, 1859) was a businessman and political figure in Lower Canada (now Quebec). An immigrant from the United States, he became a prosperous businessman. He was involved in improving local education in the Eastern Townships, an area which had recently opened for colonial settlement. He represented the Stanstead Township of Lower Canada, first in the Legislative Assembly of Lower Canada, later in the Legislative Assembly of the Province of Canada. He supported the Parti patriote in the 1830s, and fled to exile in the United States for a short time after the Lower Canada Rebellion in 1837.

Child's politics moderated after the Rebellion and he took a more conservative approach after his return. After serving one term in the Province of Canada Assembly, he continued to be active in the business and social activities of Stanstead, but later moved to nearby Coaticook. He died in 1859 of an inflammation of the lungs.

== Early life and family ==
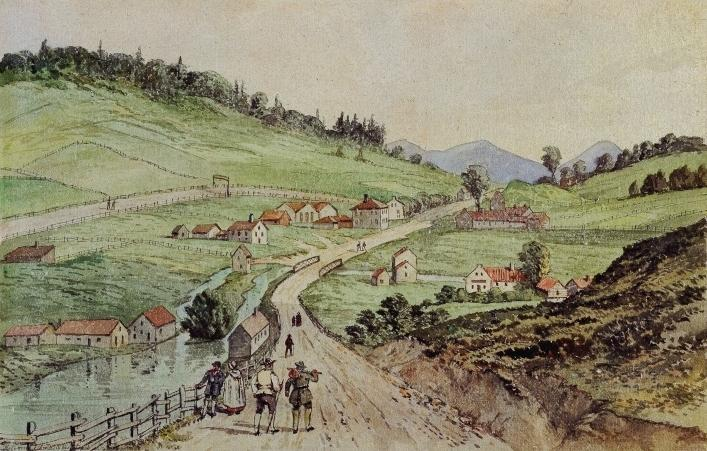
Kilbourn Mill, Stanstead, 1827, on the River Tomifobia

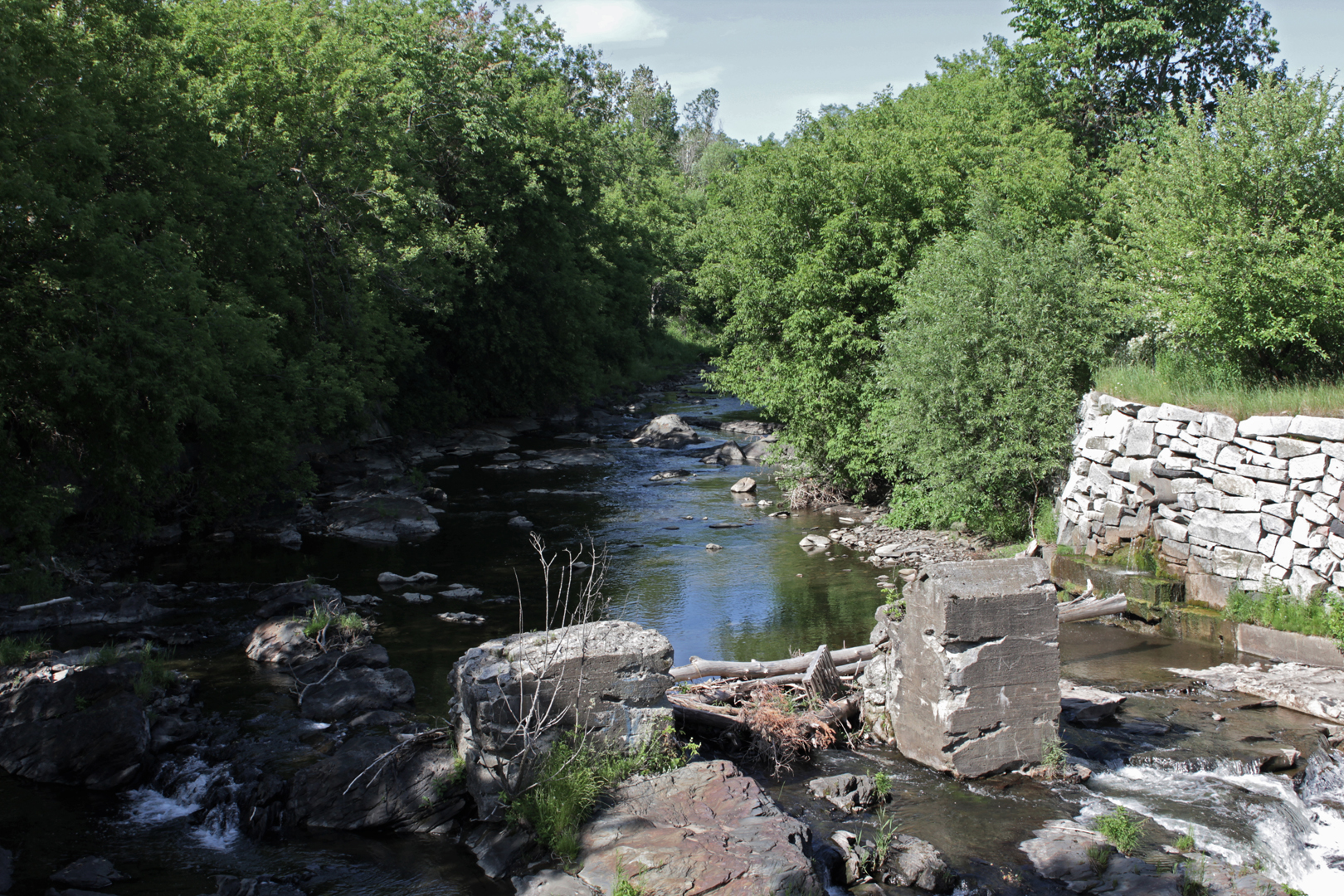
River Tomifobia today

Child was born in 1792 in West Boylston, Worcester County, Massachusetts. He worked for a short time for an uncle in Vermont, then emigrated to Stanstead Township, Lower Canada in 1812, where he entered business as a druggist. He gradually acquired considerable property in the area. Around 1819, he married Lydia F. Chadwick, also from Worcester, Massachusetts. The couple had children, only two of whom survived infancy: Elizabeth and George. Elizabeth predeceased her parents as an adult.

Child served as postmaster for Stanstead and as justice of the peace for the Montreal and St. Francis districts. He took a strong interest in education in the area. From 1815 to 1840, he was a visitor in the local schools. From 1822 to 1829, he was a trustee for a school established by the Royal Institution for the Advancement of Learning. He was also involved in the establishment of the first two secondary schools in the area, the Charleston Academy and the Stanstead Seminary. Child was a secretary and trustee of the Seminary, which was only one of two schools providing a classical education in the Eastern Townships. A member of the Methodist Church, he was also the secretary of the Stanstead County Bible Society, and a Grand Master of the local Masonic Lodge.

== Lower Canada: Political activity ==
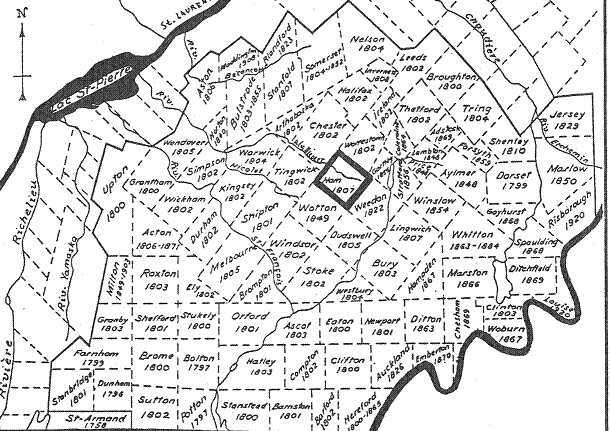
The Eastern Townships — Stanstead at bottom centre, township 1800

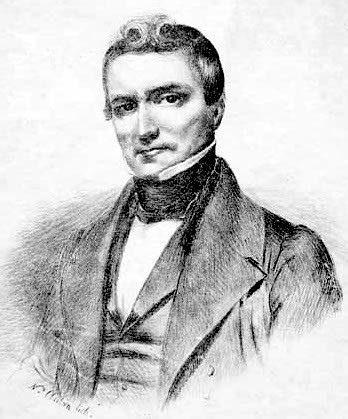
Louis-Joseph Papineau, leader of the Parti patriote

Child first became involved in politics in 1822, when the British government was considering the reunification of Lower Canada and Upper Canada (now Ontario). The proposal triggered substantial opposition from French-Canadians in Lower Canada, but had support from English-Canadians. Child was one of the few in the largely English-settled Eastern Townships who opposed re-unification.

In 1829, a new constituency for the Legislative Assembly of Lower Canada was created for the Stanstead area, to be represented by two members. Child stood for election and was one of the successful candidates. He generally supported the Parti patriote as a reformer. While in office, he helped obtain government funding for the Stanstead Seminary and the Charleston Academy.

Child did not stand for election in the general election of 1831, because his parliamentary duties at Quebec entailed long absences away from his family. However, he re-entered politics in a by-election in March 1833. The returning officer held that he had been defeated by the opposing candidate, Wright Chamberlain, but this decision was subsequently set aside by the Legislative Assembly on an election petition. On February 18, 1834, the Assembly held that Child had been elected.

Child was sworn into the Assembly the next day, February 19, 1834, just in time to participate in the debate on the Ninety-Two Resolutions, introduced by Louis-Joseph Papineau and other members of the Parti patriote. The Resolutions were highly critical of the colonial government, headed by the Governor General (appointed by the British government), and the Legislative Council, an oligarchic body appointed by the Governor General and dominated by the British commercial classes of the colony. The Resolutions called for substantive constitutional reforms. The Assembly passed the Resolutions by a strong majority (56–24), with a clear split between French-Canadian and English-Canadian members. Child was one of the few English-Canadians who voted in favour of the Resolutions.

Child stood for re-election in 1834. The local paper gave him an endorsement, saying that he was "...by no means a polished orator, or calculated to shine in debate, as but few men are, but is capable of expressing himself with ease, force and clearness." His opponents ran as moderate reformers, while Child and his running mate, John Grannis, were elected as supporters of the Parti patriote. The Patriotes won a strong majority overall in the province.

In the new Assembly, Child was part of the permanent committee on schools and education, charged with investigating the state of public education in the province. He also chaired a committee which investigated the conduct of the sheriff in Sherbrooke, who was part of the group supporting one of the major landholders, William Bowman Felton. The committee produced a report that was highly critical of the sheriff. Child also supported Papineau's steady attacks on the British American Land Company, a private company charged with developing Crown lands in the Eastern Townships. Child was active in the Patriote movement in the Eastern Townships, participating in public meetings attended by major Patriote leaders like Papineau, Denis-Benjamin Viger, and Augustin-Norbert Morin. However, support for the Patriote movement began to wane in the Eastern Townships in the mid-1830s, when Papineau suggested that the semi-feudal seigneurial system of land-holding should be extended there, replacing the freehold system based on English common law. When Grannis resigned his seat in 1836, he was replaced in the by-election by a more conservative candidate, Moses French Colby, who opposed some of the key points of the Ninety-Two Resolutions, such as making the Legislative Council elected rather than appointed.

In November 1837, the Lower Canada Rebellion broke out. Child did not participate in any of armed battles, but he sympathised with the Patriotes and appears to have assisted some of them in fleeing to the United States. As a result, he was removed from his positions as postmaster and justice of the peace. In 1838, he himself went to Vermont to avoid being arrested. The outbreak of the Rebellion, and the loss of his two government positions, seems to have affected Child and his political views. One Patriote wrote that "[Child] worships his property too much to jeopardize his safety by doing anything or even saying anything to advance the interests of the sacred cause."

Child eventually returned to Lower Canada. His position as a member of the Lower Canada Assembly ended on March 27, 1838, with the suspension of the provincial constitution and replacement by the Special Council of Lower Canada. Although he continued to live in Stanstead, he began to develop business interests in nearby Coaticook where he established himself as a merchant, potash manufacturer, and carding-miller.

== Province of Canada: Member of the Legislative Assembly ==
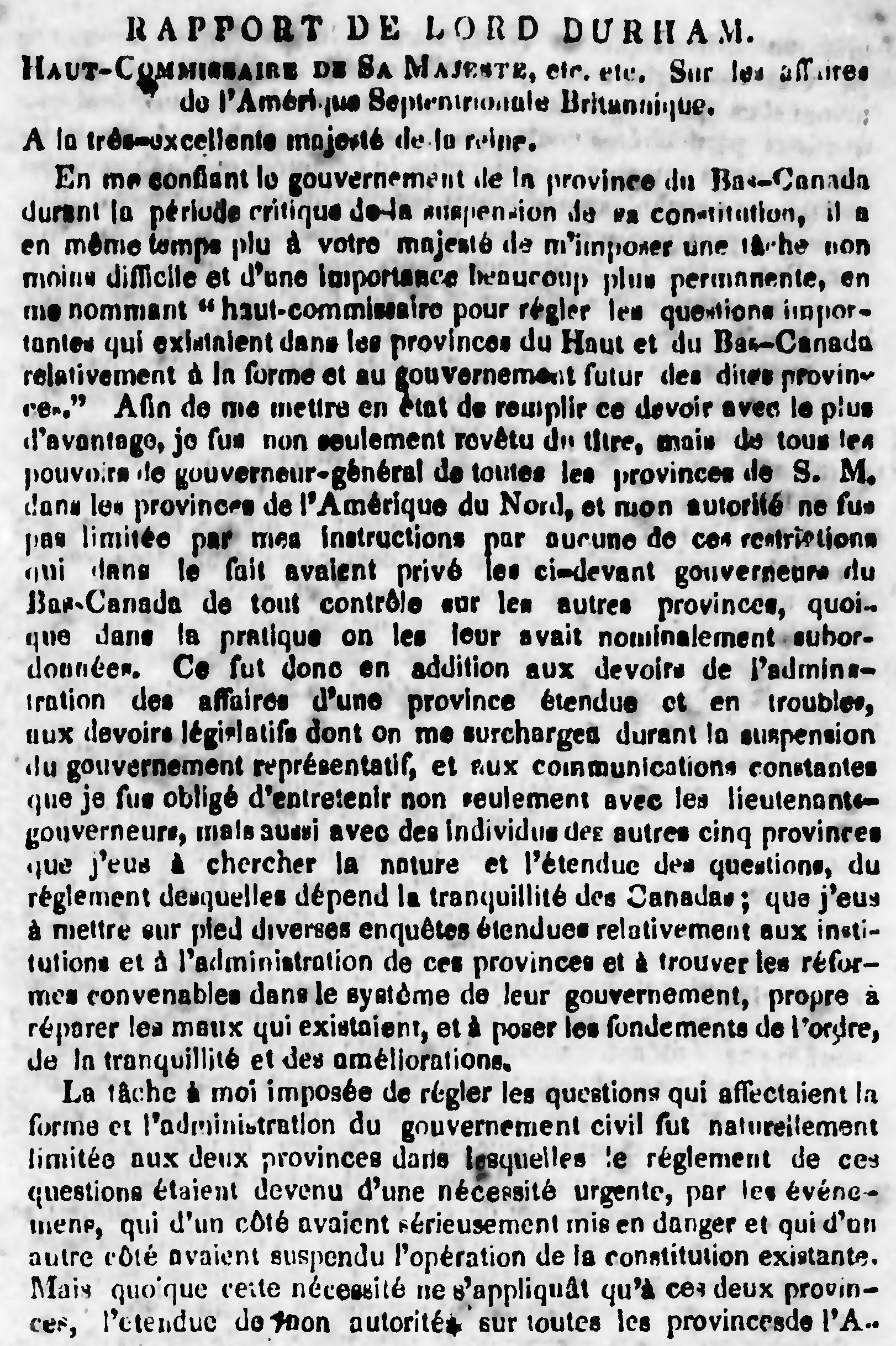
Lord Durham's Report

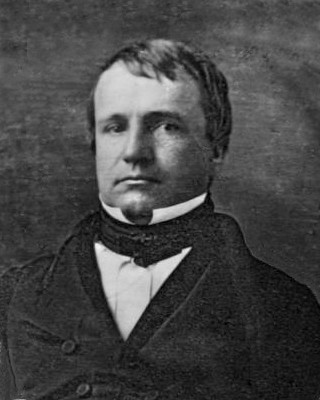
Louis-Hippolyte LaFontaine, whom Child supported in the dispute with Governor General Metcalfe

Following the rebellion in Lower Canada, and the similar rebellion in Upper Canada in 1837, the British government decided to merge the two provinces into a single province, as recommended by Lord Durham in the Durham Report. The Union Act, 1840, passed by the British Parliament, abolished the two provinces and their separate parliaments. It created the Province of Canada, with a single Parliament for the entire province, composed of an elected Legislative Assembly and an appointed Legislative Council. The Governor General initially retained a strong position in the government.

In 1841, Child stood for election to represent Stanstead in the new Legislative Assembly. His opponent was Moses French Colby, who had replaced Grannis in the 1837 by-election and had been Child's paired member from Stanstead in the Lower Canada Assembly. Both candidates supported the union. Child continued to represent the reform perspective, while Colby supported the more conservative perspective. The poll stayed open for twelve days, a lengthy period, as the supporters of the two candidates hotly contested the election. Child was elected.

In the first session, the major issue was a debate on the union. One of the leaders of the French-Canadian Group, John Neilson, introduced a motion condemning the way the union had been imposed on Lower Canada. Child voted in support of the union and against the motion, which was defeated. He was a consistent supporter of the Governor General throughout the term of the first Parliament, until the final session of the Assembly, when he voted against the Governor General's position.

The last major political issue of the first Assembly occurred in the third session, in 1843. The ministry headed by Louis-Hippolyte LaFontaine and Robert Baldwin resigned en masse in a conflict with Governor General Sir Charles Metcalfe, on the basis that the elected representatives should control appointments to government positions, not the governor. On a major debate in the Assembly on the issue, Child voted in support of the members of the Executive Council, and against the Governor General.

During his term in office, Child supported government programmes favouring agriculture, such as roads and better municipal governments. He opposed the expansion of the timber trade, and pressed for policies protecting freshwater fish spawning. He reluctantly accepted the need for tariff protection for local industries, in response to increases in American tariffs. He also argued that appointments in the post office should be brought under control of the Executive Council, apparently in reaction to his termination as local postmaster by the Postmaster General.

Child stood for election in the general elections of 1844, but was defeated by John McConnell, who supported the Governor General. When LaFontaine and Baldwin were returned to power in the 1848 general elections, Child was given control over government patronage in the Stanstead area. He sought re-election in 1851 as a LaFontaine supporter, but was defeated.

== Later life and death ==
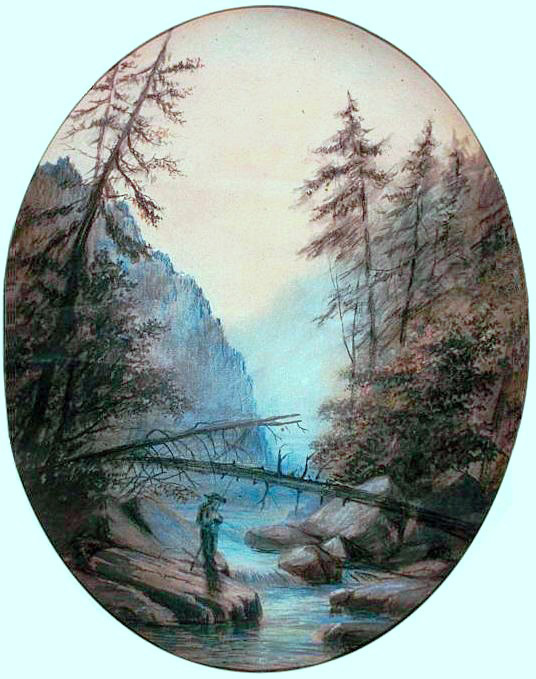
River Coaticook, c. 1850

Child later served as senior magistrate for Stanstead County and inspector of schools for the Saint Francis district. Following the decision of the St. Lawrence and Atlantic Railroad to build its branch line through Coaticook instead of Stanstead, Child sold his Stanstead properties and moved to Coaticook. He had earlier suggested the name "Coaticook" for the post office, based on the local Coaticook River. The name was later adopted by the town. Child was active in the business and social affairs of his new town. He changed his religious affiliation to the Anglican Church, which appeared to be an example of a shift towards a more conservative viewpoint.

He died in Coaticook in 1859, from an inflammation of the lungs.
