= Gadabout =

Gadabout may refer to:

== People ==
- Gadabout Gaddis (Roscoe Vernon Gaddis; 1896–1986), American fisherman and television pioneer

== Vehicles ==
- Gadabout (1914–1916 automobile), an American automobile manufactured in Newark, New Jersey, and later in Detroit
- Gadabout (1946 automobile), an American automobile manufactured in Grosse Pointe Park, Michigan
- Phillips Gadabout, a British brand of mopeds produced in the early 1960s

== See also ==
- Sir Gadabout: The Worst Knight in the Land, a British children's television show (2002–2003)
- Godbout (disambiguation)
