= Bouffard =

Bouffard may refer to:

- Auguste-Désiré Bouffard (1854–1916), a French agronomist
- Édouard Bouffard (1858–1903), a lawyer and political figure in Quebec
- Jean Bouffard (1800–1843), a notary and political figure in Lower Canada
- Léon Bouffard (1893–1981), a Swiss pole vault athlete
- Scarlet Mae Bouffard Garcia (1985–2008), a Filipino glamour model
