= Ralph Taylor =

Ralph Taylor may refer to:

- Ralph Taylor (ice hockey) (1905–1976), ice hockey player
- Ralph Taylor (politician) (1773–1847), merchant and political figure in Lower Canada
- Ralph Taylor (archer) (1874–1958), American archer
- Ralph Taylor (footballer) (1915–2012), Australian rules footballer
- Ralph Taylor (divine) (1647–1722), English non-juroring clergyman
