= Stanstead (Province of Canada electoral district) =

Electoral district in former Province of Canada

Stanstead Canada East
Province of Canada electoral district

Defunct pre-Confederation electoral district
- Legislature: Legislative Assembly of the Province of Canada
- District created: 1841
- District abolished: 1867
- First contested: 1841
- Last contested: 1863

Stanstead was an electoral district of the Legislative Assembly of the Parliament of the Province of Canada, in Canada East. It was south-east of Montreal, in the Eastern Townships. Created in 1841, it was based on the previous electoral district of the same name for the Legislative Assembly of Lower Canada.

Stanstead was represented by one member in the Legislative Assembly. It was abolished in 1867, upon the creation of Canada and the province of Quebec.

== Boundaries ==
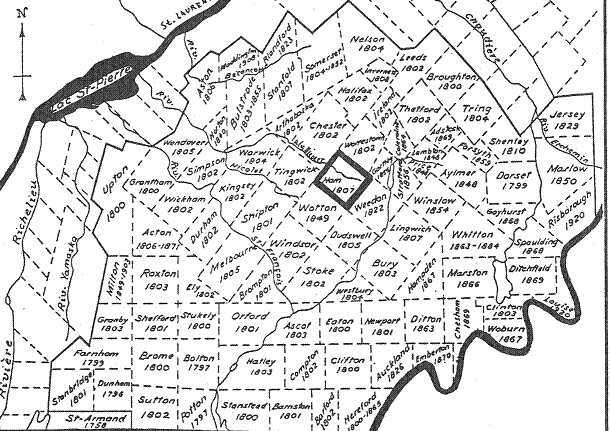
Map of the Eastern Townships, with Stanstead at bottom centre, township 1800

Stanstead electoral district was located In the Eastern Townships, south of Montreal (including areas now in Memphrémagog Regional County Municipality and Coaticook Regional County Municipality). The district extended south to the border with the United States.

The Union Act, 1840 merged the two provinces of Upper Canada and Lower Canada into the Province of Canada, with a single Parliament. The separate parliaments of Lower Canada and Upper Canada were abolished. The Union Act provided that the pre-existing electoral boundaries of Lower Canada and Upper Canada would continue to be used in the new Parliament, unless altered by the Union Act itself.

The Lower Canada electoral district of Stanstead was not altered by the Union Act and therefore continued with the same boundaries in the new Parliament. Those boundaries had been set by a statute of Lower Canada in 1829:

The County of Stanstead shall contain the Townships of Hatley, Barston, Barford, Stanstead, Bolton and Potton, with all the gores and augmentations of the said Township

== Members of the Legislative Assembly (1841–1867) ==
Stanstead was a single-member constituency.

The following were the members of the Legislative Assembly for Stanstead. The party affiliations are based on the biographies of individual members given by the National Assembly of Quebec, as well as votes in the Legislative Assembly. "Party" was a fluid concept, especially during the early years of the Province of Canada.

Parliament	Members	Years in Office	Party
1st Parliament; 1841–1844	Marcus Child	1841–1844	Unionist; initially government supporter; later "British" Member
2nd Parliament; 1844–1847	John McConnell	1844–1851	"British" Tory
3rd Parliament; 1848–1851	John McConnell	1844–1851	Conservative Independent
4th Parliament; 1851–1854	Hazard Bailey Terrill (Note: Died in office, October 28, 1852: Côté, Political Appointments and Elections, p. 62, note (147).)	1851–1852	"English" Moderate
4th Parliament; 1851–1854	Timothy Lee Terrill (Note: Elected in by-election, November 23, 1852: Côté, Political Appointments and Elections, p. 62, note (148).)	1852–1854	Liberal
5th Parliament 1854–1857	Timothy Lee Terrill (Note: Appointed Provincial Secretary, an office of profit under the Crown and vacated seat, May 24, 1856; re-elected in ministerial by-election, June 10, 1856: Côté, Political Appointments and Elections, p. 63, note (196).)	1854–1861	Conservative
6th Parliament; 1858–1861	Timothy Lee Terrill	1854–1861	Conservative
7th Parliament; 1861–1863	Albert Knight	1861–1867	Conservative
8th Parliament	Albert Knight	1861–1867	Confederation; Conservative

== Abolition ==
The district was abolished on July 1, 1867, when the British North America Act, 1867 came into force, creating Canada and splitting the Province of Canada into Quebec and Ontario. It was succeeded by electoral districts of the same name in the House of Commons of Canada and the Legislative Assembly of Quebec.

== See also ==
- List of elections in the Province of Canada
