= John Munn =

John Munn may refer to:

- John Munn (Manitoba politician) (1882–1941), Manitoba veterinarian and politician
- John Munn (shipbuilder) (1788–1859), shipbuilder and politician in Lower Canada
- John Munn (Newfoundland politician) (1807–1879), Newfoundland businessman and politician
- John C. Munn - United States Marine Corps general officer
- John Shannon Munn (1880–1918), Newfoundland businessman and first-class cricketer
