= René Boileau =

René Boileau may refer to:

- René Boileau (ice hockey) (1904–1969), Canadian NHL player
- René Boileau (politician) (1754–1831), Canadian politician
