= Benjamin Beaupré =

Canadian politician

Benjamin Beaupré (1780 – November 27, 1842) was a businessman and political figure in Lower Canada.

He was born in 1780, probably at L'Assomption. He was a merchant and served as captain in the local militia. In 1804, Beaupré married Julie Mercier, the daughter of a merchant. In 1816, he was elected to the Legislative Assembly of Lower Canada for Leinster. In 1838, he married Charlotte Robillard, a widow, after the death of his first wife.

He died at L'Assomption in 1842.

His daughter Élise married Édouard-Étienne Rodier, who also was a member of the legislative assembly. His daughter Joséphine married Pierre-Urgel Archambault, who became a member of the legislative council and also served as mayor of L'Assomption.
