= Lotbinière (Province of Canada electoral district) =

Electoral district in former Province of Canada

Province of Canada electoral district

Defunct pre-Confederation electoral district
- Legislature: Legislative Assembly of the Province of Canada
- District created: 1841
- District abolished: 1867
- First contested: 1841
- Last contested: 1863

Lotbinière was an electoral district of the Legislative Assembly of the Parliament of the Province of Canada, in Canada East, near Quebec City. It was created in 1841 and was based on the previous electoral district of the same name for the Legislative Assembly of Lower Canada. It was represented by one member in the Legislative Assembly.

The electoral district was abolished in 1867, upon the creation of Canada and the province of Quebec.

== Boundaries ==
The Union Act, 1840 merged the two provinces of Upper Canada and Lower Canada into the Province of Canada, with a single Parliament. The separate parliaments of Lower Canada and Upper Canada were abolished.

The Union Act provided that the pre-existing electoral boundaries of Lower Canada and Upper Canada would continue to be used in the new Parliament, unless altered by the Union Act itself. The Lotbinière electoral district of Lower Canada was not altered by the Act, and therefore continued with the same boundaries which had been set by a statute of Lower Canada in 1829:

The County of Lotbinière shall be bounded on the north east by the south western boundary line of the Seigniories of Lauzon, Saint Etienne, and Sainte Marie, to the south angle of the said Seigniory of Sainte Marie, on the south west by the south west boundary of the Seigniory of Saint Jean d'Eschaillons, and the augmentation thereof, on the south east by the rear lines of the Seigniories of Saint Giles, Sainte Croix, and the augmentation of the Seigniories of Lotbinière and Saint Jean d'Eschaillons, and on the north west by the River Saint Lawrence; which County so bounded comprises the Seigniories of Tilly or Saint Antoine, Gaspé, Saint Giles des Pleines, Bonsecours, Sainte Croix, Lotbinière and Saint Jean d'Eschaillons, and their augmentations.

The electoral district was on the south shore of the Saint Lawrence, near Quebec City (now in the Lotbinière Regional County Municipality). Elections were held at Sainte-Croix.

== Members of the Legislative Assembly ==
Lotbinière was a single-member constituency.

The following were the members of the Legislative Assembly from Lotbinière. "Party" was a fluid concept, especially during the early years of the Province of Canada. Party affiliations are based on the biographies of individual members given by the National Assembly of Quebec, as well as votes in the Legislative Assembly.

Parliament	Member	Years in Office	Party
1st Parliament; 1841–1844	Jean-Baptiste-Isaïe Noël	1841–1844	Anti-unionist; French-Canadian Group

== Abolition ==
The district was abolished on July 1, 1867, when the British North America Act, 1867 came into force, splitting the Province of Canada into Quebec and Ontario. It was succeeded by electoral districts of the same name in the House of Commons of Canada and the Legislative Assembly of Quebec.
