= Paul-Timothée Masson =

Canadian politician

Paul-Timothée Masson (December 18, 1795 – June 15, 1881) was a lumber merchant and political figure in Quebec. He represented Vaudreuil in the Legislative Assembly of Lower Canada from 1831 to 1834.

He was born in Saint-Eustache, Lower Canada, the son of Jean-Baptiste Masson and Charlotte Roussil. In 1818, he married Esther Masson. He was named a commissioner for the trial of minor causes in 1836. Masson was elected to the legislative assembly in an 1831 by-election held after Godefroy Beaudet resigned his seat. He voted in support of the Ninety-Two Resolutions. Masson was defeated when he ran for reelection in 1834. He died at Saint-Charles-sur-Richelieu at the age of 85.
