= Félix Têtu =

Canadian politician

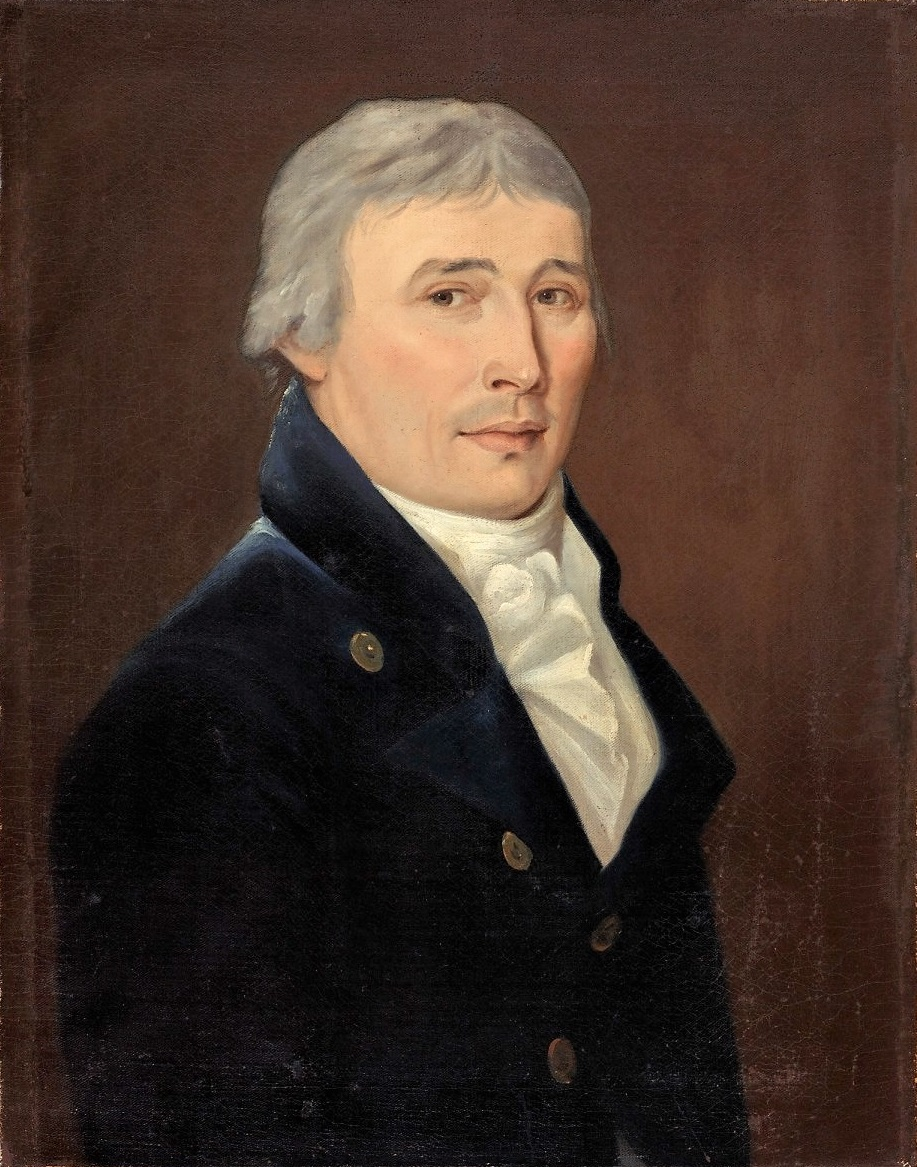
Félix Têtu (circa 1812) by Louis Dulongpré

Félix Têtu (January 26, 1769 – October 12, 1853) was a notary and political figure in Lower Canada. He represented Hertford in the Legislative Assembly of Lower Canada from 1796 to 1800.

He was born in Saint-Thomas, the son of Félix Têtu and Marie-Madeleine Vallée, and was educated at the Petit Séminaire de Québec. He apprenticed as a notary and was licensed to practise in 1795. Têtu practised mainly at Quebec City. He served in the militia, reaching the rank of lieutenant-colonel. Têtu did not run for reelection in 1800 and was defeated when he ran in Dorchester in 1809. He died in Saint-Thomas at the age of 84.

His nephew Vital Têtu also served in the assembly.
