= Louis Poulin =

Canadian politician

Louis Poulin (March 8, 1785 – April 24, 1849) was a farmer and political figure in Lower Canada. He represented Saint-Hyacinthe in the Legislative Assembly of Lower Canada from 1832 to 1834.

He was born Louis-Michel Poulin in Saint-Charles-sur-Richelieu, Quebec, the son of Étienne Poulin and Élisabeth Blanchard, dit Renault. In 1811, he married Marie-Angélique Benoit, dit Livernois. Poulin served in the militia during the War of 1812. He was elected to the legislative assembly in an 1832 by-election held after Jean Dessaulles was named to the legislative council. Poulin voted in support of the Ninety-Two Resolutions. He died at Sainte-Rosalie at the age of 64.
