= Amable Éno, dit Deschamps =

Canadian politician

Amable Éno, dit Deschamps (April 27, 1785 – July 22, 1875) was a political figure in Quebec. He represented L'Assomption from 1830 to 1834 in the Legislative Assembly of Lower Canada as a supporter of the Parti patriote. His name also appears as Amable Deschamps.

He was born in L'Assomption, Quebec, the son of Jean-Baptiste Hénault dit Deschamps and Marie-Victoire Limoges. Originally working as a blacksmith, Éno, dit Deschamps later became a farmer at Repentigny. He married Marie-Louise Hétu in 1812. He served as an officer in the militia, reaching the rank of lieutenant-colonel, and was justice of the peace. Amable Éno, dit Deschamps voted in support of the Ninety-Two Resolutions. He was defeated by Jean-Baptiste Meilleur when he ran for reelection in 1834. He died in Repentigny at the age of 90.
