= Cléophe Cimon =

Cléophe Cimon (1822 – March 29, 1888) was a notary and political figure in Canada East. His surname also appears as Simon.

He was born at Saint-Étienne-de-la-Malbaie in 1822, the son of a merchant and navigator. Cimon studied at the Petit Séminaire de Québec, qualified to practice as a notary in 1843 and set up practice at La Malbaie and then Quebec City. In 1846, he married Marie-Caroline Langlois. He was inspector of schools for Charlevoix County from 1852 to 1859. In 1858, he was elected to the Legislative Assembly of the Province of Canada for Charlevoix. After 1872, he returned to La Malbaie.

He died at Saint-Étienne-de-la-Malbaie in 1888.

His uncle André Cimon represented Saguenay in the legislative assembly for Lower Canada. His brother Simon-Xavier and his son Ernest were members of the Canadian House of Commons. His daughter Marie Caroline married Philippe Dufour, who later served in the Quebec Legislative Assembly.
