= Nicolas-Gaspard Boisseau =

Canadian politician (1765–1842)

Nicolas-Gaspard Boisseau (October 10, 1765 – March 9, 1842) was a notary and political figure in Lower Canada.

He was born at Saint-Pierre, Île d'Orléans in 1765, the son of Nicolas-Gaspard Boisseau and the grandson of court clerk and royal notary Nicolas Boisseau, and studied at the Petit Séminaire de Québec. His studies were interrupted by the invasion of Quebec City by the Americans in 1775-6 and he completed his studies from 1778 to 1780. He qualified to practice as a notary in 1791. In the same year, he married Catherine, the daughter of seigneur Ignace-Philippe Aubert de Gaspé. In 1792, Boisseau was elected to the 1st Parliament of Lower Canada for the island of Orléans. After his term in office, he resumed his practice as a notary at Saint-Vallier and then in the parish of Saint-Thomas at Montmagny.

Boisseau produced a series of memoirs between 1787 and 1789 that were published in 1907 as Mémoires de Nicolas-Gaspard Boisseau.

He died at Saint-Thomas in 1842.

His daughter Catherine married Jean-Charles Létourneau, who later became a member of the legislative assembly.
