= William Power (Lower Canada judge) =

Canadian judge (1800–1860)

William Power (September 10, 1800 – July 11, 1860) was a lawyer, judge and political figure in Lower Canada and Canada East. He represented Gaspé in the Legislative Assembly of Lower Canada from 1832 to 1838.

He was born in Harbour Grace, Newfoundland, the son of Michael Power, an Irish immigrant, and Elizabeth Tovig. Power was educated in Ireland, then studied law at Quebec City with Norman Fitzgerald Uniacke and then George Vanfelson, and was admitted to the Lower Canada bar in 1826. In 1827, he was named clerk for the Vice Admiralty Court. Power voted against the Ninety-Two Resolutions. He married Suzanne Aubert de Gaspé, the daughter of Philippe-Joseph Aubert de Gaspé, in 1829. He was a captain in the Queen's Volunteers in the Eastern Townships. In 1840, he was named to the Court of Appeals for Quebec district; in 1844, he was named to the circuit court and, in 1857, to the Quebec Superior Court for Montmagny district. He died in Montmagny at the age of 59.
