= Godbout (disambiguation) =

Godbout often refers to Godbout, Quebec, a village municipality in Canada.

Godbout may also refer to:

- Godbout (surname), includes a list of notable people with the surname
- Godbout River, in the Côte-Nord region of Quebec, Canada
- Godbout v Longueuil (City of), a Supreme Court of Canada decision

== See also ==
- Gadabout (disambiguation)
