= Théophile Lemay =

Canadian farmer and politician (1784–1848)

Théophile Lemay (October 12, 1784 – April 17, 1848) was a farmer, notary and political figure in Lower Canada. He represented Rouville in the Legislative Assembly of Lower Canada from 1832 to 1834.

He was born Théophile Lemay, dit Delorme in Varennes, Quebec, the son of Paul Lemay, dit Delorme and Élisabeth Monjon. He was a farmer at Sainte-Marie-de-Monnoir until 1820 when he qualified to practice as a notary. Lemay served in the militia during the War of 1812, later reaching the rank of lieutenant-colonel. He was a commissioner for the trial of minor causes and a justice of the peace. He was married twice: to Marie-Esther Letêtu in 1810 and to Julie-Scholastique Talon-Lespérance in 1836. Lemay was first elected to the legislative assembly in an 1832 by-election held after Jean-Baptiste-René Hertel de Rouville retired due to poor health. He voted against the Ninety-Two Resolutions. Lemay was defeated when he ran for reelection in 1834. He was captured by the rebels in 1837 and held until late the following year. Lemay died at Sainte-Marie-de-Monnoir at the age of 63.
