= Stevens Baker =

Canadian politician

Stevens Baker (August 16, 1791 – February 29, 1868) was a farmer and political figure in Quebec. He represented Missisquoi in the Legislative Assembly of Lower Canada from 1830 to 1834.

Baker was born in Petersham, Massachusetts, the son of Joseph Baker and Molly Stevens, and came to Dunham, Quebec with his parents in 1799. He was involved in raising and importing livestock. In 1818, he married Lavina Barnes, his cousin. He was named a commissioner for the trial of minor causes and justice of the peace in 1830. He voted against the Ninety-Two Resolutions. Baker was a lieutenant-colonel in the militia and supported the British during the Lower Canada Rebellion. His brother William succeeded him as representative for Missisquoi in the legislative assembly in 1834. Baker died in Dunham at the age of 76.
