= John Grannis =

Lower Canada farmer, educator and politician

Member of the Legislative Assembly of Lower Canada for Stanstead Township
- In office 1834–1836 Serving with Marcus Child
- Preceded by: Ebenezer Peck
- Succeeded by: Moses French Colby

Personal details
- Born: Unknown Claremont, New Hampshire
- Died: After 1836
- Party: Parti patriote
- Spouse: Roxanna Grannis (died 1834)
- Occupation: Farmer, educator

John Grannis was a farmer, educator, and political figure in the Eastern Townships of Lower Canada in the 1820s and 1830s. He is believed to have been born in Claremont, New Hampshire in the early 19th century, but the year of his birth is unknown. The location and year of his death is also unknown.

Grannis emigrated from the United States at some date in the early 19th century, to the village of Charleston (also known as East Hatley) in the Eastern Townships. He was involved in agriculture. In 1829, he was a founder and administrator of the Charleston Academy, one of the first secondary schools in the Eastern Townships. He was associated in the establishment of the academy with Marcus Child of Stanstead Township.

His wife, Roxanna Grannis, died February 16, 1834.

In October 1834, Grannis was elected to represent Stanstead Township in the Legislative Assembly of Lower Canada. Stanstead was a two-member constituency. Marcus Child was his running mate, and was also elected. The two members supported the Parti patriote, the party of the French-Canadian majority in Lower Canada which was agitating for constitutional reform and greater popular control of the colonial government.

In October 1836, Grannis resigned his seat in the Assembly, on the basis that he was permanently leaving the province.

His subsequent history is unknown.
