= Anthony Anderson (politician) =

Canadian politician

Anthony Anderson (1767 – April 3, 1847) was a Scottish-born merchant and political figure in Lower Canada. He represented Mégantic in the Legislative Assembly of Lower Canada from 1832 to 1834.

He was born in Jedburgh and came to the British Province of Quebec in 1784. He established himself as a merchant and butcher at Quebec City. Anderson supplied the army and navy and also invested in real estate. In 1794, he married Margaret Jefferys. He served as quartermaster during the War of 1812. Anderson served in the militia, reaching the rank of captain, and was also a justice of the peace. Anderson was a director for the Savings Bank of Quebec. He voted against the Ninety-Two Resolutions. Anderson died at Quebec City at the age of 79.
