= Ralph Taylor (politician) =

Canadian politician 1773–1847

Ralph Taylor (March 29, 1773 – February 9, 1847) was a merchant and political figure in Lower Canada. He represented Missisquoi in the Legislative Assembly from 1829 to 1834.

He was born in Philipsburg, Lower Canada, the son of Alexander Taylor, a United Empire Loyalist from New York, and Jane Brisbane. He served as a commissioner for the trial of minor causes and as a school inspector for Missisquoi and Shefford counties. Taylor married Maria Lester in 1816. Up until 1832, he supported the Parti patriote, but he voted against the Ninety-Two Resolutions. In March 1833, he was put in prison for 24 hours for publishing a letter in the Quebec Mercury critical of the speaker of the assembly. He died in Philipsburg at the age of 53.
