= William Baker (Lower Canada politician) =

Canadian politician

William Baker (1789 – May 1866) was a businessman and political figure in Lower Canada. He represented Missisquoi in the Legislative Assembly of Lower Canada from 1834 until the suspension of the constitution in 1838.

He was born in Petersham, Massachusetts, the son of Joseph Baker and Maria "Molly" Stevens, and came to Dunham in Lower Canada in 1799 with his family. Baker studied medicine but never practised as a physician. He was named village schoolmaster in 1812 but shortly afterwards entered business. Baker was named justice of the peace in 1831. Baker was married, probably in Massachusetts, around 1821. He died in Dunham.

His brother Stevens also represented Missisquoi in the assembly. His son George Barnard served in the Quebec assembly and the Canadian House of Commons and Senate. His grandson George Harold Baker was a member of the Canadian House of Commons.
