= René Boileau (politician) =

Canadian politician

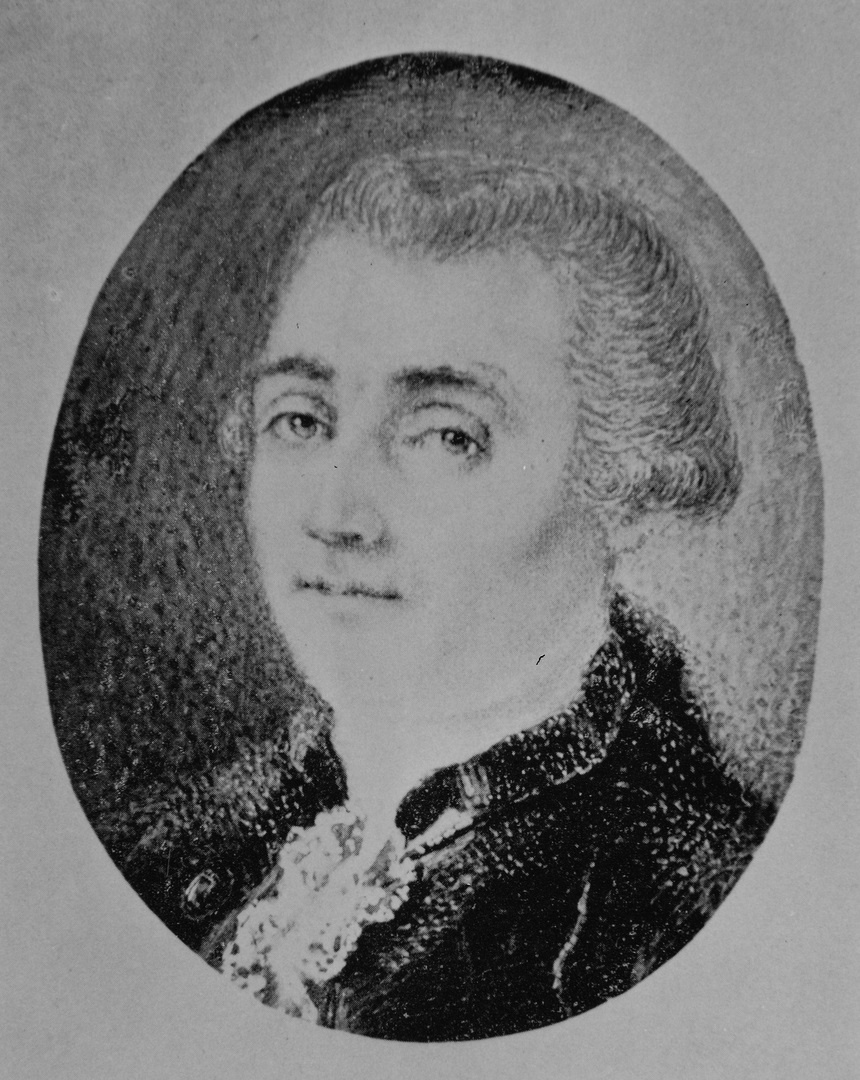
René Boileau by François Baillairgé

René Boileau (October 26, 1754 – July 11, 1831) was a political figure in Lower Canada.

He was born in Chambly in 1754. He was a trader there. He served as a major in the local militia during the American Revolution. Boileau was elected to the 1st Parliament of Lower Canada for Kent. He was named justice of the peace for the Montreal district in 1799. Boileau was part of a committee formed in Kent County to oppose the union of Upper and Lower Canada proposed in 1822.

He died at Chambly in 1831 after having been ill for several months.

His daughter Emmélie married Timothée Kimber, a physician and one of the Patriote leaders in Chambly County. His daughter Sophie married Joseph-Toussaint Drolet, who also later served in the legislative assembly.
