= Merritt Hotchkiss =

Canadian politician

Merritt Hotchkiss (before 1814 – 1865 or later) was a merchant and political figure in Lower Canada. He represented L'Acadie in the Legislative Assembly of Lower Canada from 1834 until the suspension of the constitution in 1838.

He was the son in law of Henry Hoyle. Hotchkiss established himself in business at Lacolle, where he also operated a flour mill. He served as a commissioner for the Tribunal of Minor Pleas. In 1838, he married the adopted daughter of Henry Hoyle, Sarah Anne Visscher Schuyler.
