= Ephraim Knight =

Canadian politician

Ephraim Knight (February 27, 1786 – February 3, 1868) was a businessman and political figure in Lower Canada. He represented Missisquoi in the Legislative Assembly of Lower Canada from 1834 until the suspension of the constitution in 1838.

He was born in Shrewsbury, Vermont, the son of Amos Knight, and settled in the Eastern Townships before the War of 1812. He lived in Saint-Armand and later Dunhuam, then moved to Bedford after his marriage to Philenda Beeman in 1819. He attended an assembly of reformers at Stanbridge in 1837 and was put in prison in Montreal in 1838. Knight died in Stanbridge at the age of 81.

== Sources ==
- "Biography". Dictionnaire des parlementaires du Québec de 1792 à nos jours (in French). National Assembly of Quebec.
