= Joseph-François Deblois =

Canadian politician (1797–1860)

Joseph-François Deblois (April 2, 1797 – August 10, 1860) was a lawyer, judge and political figure in Lower Canada.

He was born in the town of Quebec in 1797, the son of a merchant, and studied at the Petit Séminaire de Québec. He served in the local militia during the War of 1812. After his father's death in 1814, he helped his mother to run the family store while he studied law with Louis Lagueux; Deblois was called to the bar in 1826. With his brother, he set up a herring fishery at Baie de Cascapédia in the Gaspé region. Deblois also began practising law in the region and set up a farm there. In 1834, he was elected to the Legislative Assembly of Lower Canada for Bonaventure. A few years later, he moved his law practice to Quebec. In 1849, he was named a circuit judge for Gaspé district, which also included the Îles de la Madeleine, and settled at Percé. He also served as president of the Société d'agriculture de Gaspé. After the post of circuit judge was abolished in 1857, Deblois retired and settled at Quebec, where he died in 1860.
