= John Le Boutillier =

Canadian politician

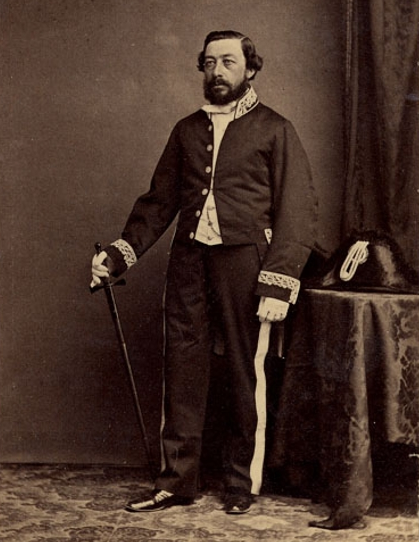

Member of the Legislative Council of Quebec for Golfe
- In office 1867–1872
- Succeeded by: Thomas Savage

Personal details
- Born: 23 April 1797 Isle of Jersey
- Died: 31 July 1872 (aged 75) Gaspé, Quebec
- Party: Conservative

John Le Boutillier or John Le Bouthillier (1797 – 31 July 1872) was a Quebec businessman and political figure.

He was born in Jersey in 1797 and came to the Gaspé peninsula around 1815 as an employee of Charles Robin. In 1830, he opened his own business exporting dried cod from the Gaspé region and settled in Gaspé.

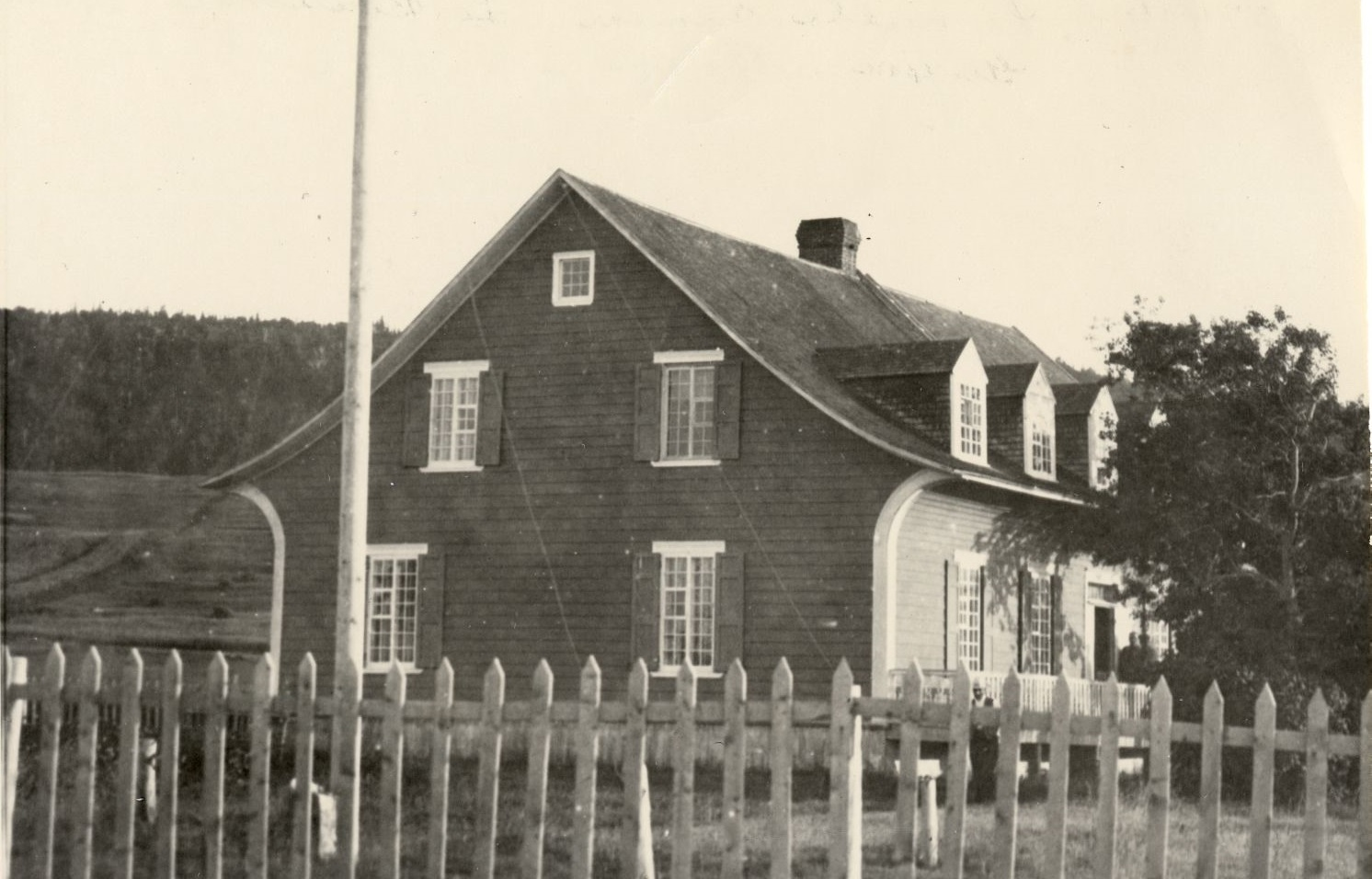
His house at Gaspé

He represented Gaspé in the Legislative Assembly of Lower Canada from 1833 to 1838 and then Bonaventure from 1844 to 1847 and Gaspé from 1854 to 1867 in the Legislative Assembly of the Province of Canada. Le Boutillier voted against the Ninety-Two Resolutions. In 1867, he was named to the Legislative Council of Quebec for the Gulf division and served until his death in Gaspé in 1872.

His firm, which had grown to 2,500 employees, 12 ships and 169 fishing boats, was taken over by Charles Robin's company after his death.

Le Boutillier's final house in Gaspé was later a hospital before being razed in the 1970s against the wishes of preservationists. Another house formerly used by John Le Boutillier Company managers was designated a National Historic Site of Canada in 1975.
