= André Cimon =

Canadian politician

André Cimon (1776 – May 12, 1853) was a merchant and political figure in Lower Canada. He represented Saguenay in the Legislative Assembly of Lower Canada from 1832 to 1838. His surname also appears as Simon.

He was born Jean-Henry Simon in Rivière-Ouelle, the son of Jean-Baptiste Simon and Angélique Deschênes. Cimon was an innkeeper and then merchant at Baie-Saint-Paul. In 1802, he married Thérèse Rodrigue. He was first elected to the legislative assembly in an 1832 by-election held after Marc-Pascal de Sales Laterrière was named to the legislative council. He mainly supported the Parti patriote and voted in support of the Ninety-Two Resolutions. Cimon died at Baie-Saint-Paul at the age of 77.

His nephew Cléophe served in the legislative assembly for the Province of Canada.
