= Theodore Hoyle =

English cricketer

Theodore Hind Hoyle (19 March 1884 – 2 June 1953) was an English first-class cricketer, who played one game for Yorkshire County Cricket Club against Northamptonshire at Bramall Lane in 1919. He also appeared for the Yorkshire Second XI in the same year, and the Yorkshire Council in 1920.

Born in Halifax, Yorkshire, England, Hoyle was a wicket-keeper, and was dismissed for seven and a duck, by Claude Woolley. He also stumped Davies off the bowling of Wilfred Rhodes, his only dismissal in first-class cricket.

Hoyle died in June 1953, in Hull, Yorkshire.
