= Charles Archambault =

Canadian politician

Charles Archambault (before 1812 – after 1838) was a Canadian politician and surveyor in Lower Canada. He represented Beauharnois in the Legislative Assembly of Lower Canada from 1830 to 1838.

He served as a captain in the militia during the War of 1812. In 1816, he qualified as a surveyor and set up practice in Beauharnois. Archambault surveyed the seigneury of Ellice. In 1831, he was named school inspector for Beauharnois County. In the legislative assembly, Archambault generally supported the Parti Patriote and voted in support of the Ninety-Two Resolutions.
