= Bellechasse (Lower Canada) =

Champlain
Lower Canada electoral district

Defunct pre-Confederation electoral district
- Legislature: Legislative Assembly of Lower Canada
- District created: 1830
- District abolished: 1838
- First contested: 1830
- Last contested: 1834

The district of Bellechasse was established in 1829, under the regime of the Constitutional Act of 1791. It was located in the current Chaudière-Appalaches area.

Bellechasse was represented simultaneously by two Members at the Legislative Assembly of Lower Canada.

== Members of the Parliament of Lower Canada ==
- Augustin-Norbert Morin and Nicolas Boissonnault (1830–1841)

== See also ==
- Bellechasse (electoral district in Canada East)
- Bellechasse (Quebec provincial electoral district)
- Bellechasse (Canadian federal electoral district)
