= Charles Rocbrune, dit Larocque =

Canadian politician

Charles Rocbrune, dit Laroque (August 1784 – September 1849) was a farmer, merchant and political figure in Lower Canada. He represented Vaudreuil in the Legislative Assembly of Lower Canada from 1833 to 1838 as a supporter of the Parti patriote. His surname also appears as Laroque or Larocque.

He was born in Sainte-Geneviève near Montreal, the son of Charles Laroquebrune and Geneviève McDonell. Originally a farmer and labourer at Sainte-Geneviève, he later became a merchant at Rigaud. He was married twice: to Marie Lefebvre in 1806 and to Julie Fournier in 1833. Around 1838, Rocbrune, dit Laroque established himself at the future site of the village of Saint-Louis-de-Gonzague, where he was also involved in the timber trade. He also acquired property in Lancaster Township. Rocbrune, dit Laroque was first elected to the legislative assembly in an 1833 by-election held after the death of Alexis Demers. He voted in support of the Ninety-Two Resolutions. He died at St. Raphaels, Canada West at the age of 65.
