= William Henry Scott (politician) =

Canadian politician

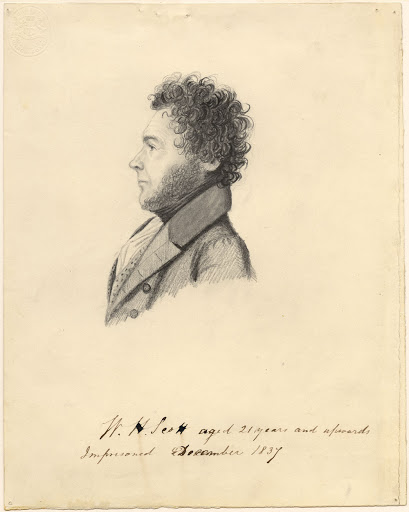
William-Henry Scott (1799-1851)

William Henry Scott (January 13, 1799 – December 18, 1851) was a businessman and political figure in Lower Canada and Canada East.

He was born in Scotland in 1797 and came to Lower Canada with his family around 1800, growing up in Montreal. He became a merchant at Saint-Eustache and a member of the militia, but was dismissed in 1827 for participating in meetings supporting the Parti patriote. In 1829, he was elected to the Legislative Assembly of Lower Canada for York County after the death of the previously elected member; he was elected to represent Deux-Montagnes in 1830 and 1834 after York was divided. He supported the Ninety-Two Resolutions but did not support the use of force, which meant that both the government and the Patriotes viewed him as a traitor. He fled but was arrested at Montreal in 1837; he was released in July 1838.

In 1844, he was elected to the Legislative Assembly of the Province of Canada for Deux-Montagnes; he was reelected in 1848 and 1851. Scott supported the Rebellion Losses Bill compensating residents of Canada East for property losses during the Lower Canada Rebellion; Scott himself was compensated for damage to his home and business. He died at Saint-Eustache in 1851.

Although he had been living with his Catholic wife since 1829 and they had five children, because he was a Presbyterian, they were only married two days before his death after Scott was able to persuade bishop Ignace Bourget to allow the marriage.
