= Alphonso Wells =

Canadian politician

Alphonso Wells (March 30, 1803 – August 24, 1852) was a land surveyor and political figure in Lower Canada. He represented Shefford in the Legislative Assembly of Lower Canada from 1834 until the constitution was suspended in 1838.

Born in Farnham, Wells was the son of Oliver Wells and Lucy Whipple, both natives of Vermont. Wells studied surveying for three years, obtained his commission as a surveyor in 1827 and settled in Saint-Hyacinthe. In 1850, he married Adelia Marcotte. He later became a provincial surveyor and lived in Montreal. Wells ran for reelection to the assembly for the Province of Canada in 1841 but withdrew his name before the election was held. He died in Montreal at the age of 49.
