= Pierre Careau =

Canadian politician

Pierre Careau (October 1786 – July 15, 1856) was a farmer and political figure in Lower Canada. He represented Rouville in the Legislative Assembly of Lower Canada from 1833 to 1838 as a supporter of the Parti patriote. His surname also appears as Carreau.

He was born in Saint-Mathias, Quebec, the son of Joseph Careau and Dorothée Loisel. Careau married Victoire Tétrau in 1804. He was first elected to the provincial assembly in an 1833 by-election held after the death of François Rainville. Careau voted in support of the Ninety-Two Resolutions. He died at Sainte-Marie-de-Monnoir at the age of 69.
