= Gadabout (1946 automobile) =

Defunct American motor vehicle manufacturer

The Gadabout was a car invented by Ray Russell in the mid-1940s, with an aluminum and magnesium body. Built on an MG frame, its proposed specifications included a two-cycle, air-cooled engine with direct fuel injection and turbocharger, which would have been mounted either in front or in back at the owner's discretion. It was featured in many Second World War publications as a model post-war car, but the project was not funded, so only the original Gadabout was ever produced.
