= Pierre Canac =

Lower Canada politician and businessman

Pierre Canac, dit Marquis (October 8, 1780 – November 25, 1850) was a businessman and political figure in Lower Canada and Canada East.

He was born Pierre Canac in Sainte-Famille on the Île d'Orléans in 1780. He became a merchant in Quebec City, moving to Saint-André in 1810. He lent money, also leased and sold land in the region and raised grain and livestock on his own farm. In 1821, he was named a justice of the peace in Quebec district. Canac also served in the local militia, reaching the rank of colonel. In 1834, he was elected to the Legislative Assembly of Lower Canada for the town of Kamouraska, originally supporting the parti patriote but later taking a more conservative position. He became mayor of Saint-André in 1845. In 1848, he was elected to the Legislative Assembly of the Province of Canada for Kamouraska as a Reformer. Canac voted in support of the Rebellion Losses Bill.

He died at Saint-André in 1850 while still in office.
