= Jean-Baptiste Beaudoin =

Canadian politician

Jean-Baptiste Beaudoin (June 12, 1787 – December 6, 1870) was a farmer and political figure in Lower Canada. He represented Dorchester in the Legislative Assembly of Lower Canada from 1834 until the suspension of the constitution in 1838, mainly supporting the parti patriote.

He was born in Saint-Henri-de-Lauzon, the son of François Beaudoin and Suzanne Hallé. Beaudoin was an officer in the militia and served during the War of 1812. He was married three times: first to Madeleine Fontaine in 1807, then to Geneviève Girard in 1839 and finally to Marguerite Bilodeau in 1853. He died at Saint-Henri-de-Lauzon at the age of 83.
