= Samuel Wood (Lower Canada politician) =

Canadian politician (1787–1848)

Samuel Wood (January 27, 1787 – January 24, 1848) was a farmer and political figure in Lower Canada. He represented Shefford in the Legislative Assembly of Lower Canada from 1832 to 1838.

He was born in Massachusetts or Vermont, the son of Philip Wood and Eunice Pierce. Wood owned a farm at Farnham. He was postmaster, school commissioner and justice of the peace. He helped establish the Shefford Academy. Wood voted against the Ninety-Two Resolutions. He was named one of the commissioners empowered to administer the oath of allegiance in January 1838. Wood was married twice: to Abigail Church in 1809 in Vermont and to Hannah Paige in 1843. He died at Farnham at the age of 60.

His son married the niece of Paul Holland Knowlton.
