= Jean-Baptiste Cazeau =

Canadian politician

Jean-Baptiste Cazeau (September 1774 – May 12, 1865) was a wheelwright and political figure in Quebec. He represented Orléans in the Legislative Assembly of Canada from 1830 to 1838.

He was born in Quebec City to Jean Cazeau and Françoise Ruel, and he married Rachel Campbell in 1806. Cazeau was a commissioner for the trial of minor causes and also served as a commissioner for the construction of a road between Saint-Jean and Sainte-Famille on Île d'Orléans. He generally supported the Parti patriote and voted in support of the Ninety-Two Resolutions. He died at Saint-Jean at the age of 90.
