= Edward Toomy =

Canadian politician

Edward Toomy (ca 1809 – December 25, 1859) was a merchant and political figure in Lower Canada. He represented Drummond in the Legislative Assembly of Lower Canada from 1833 to 1838. His surname also appears as Toomey.

Toomy was a merchant in Drummondville, Quebec. He was first elected to the legislative assembly in an 1833 by-election held after Frederick Heriot resigned his seat. He voted for the Ninety-Two Resolutions. Toomy married Catherine Clarke. He was named bailiff for the Superior Court in 1851. He died in Drummondville at the age of 50.
