= Jean-Joseph Girouard =

Lower Canada notary, politician and philanthropist

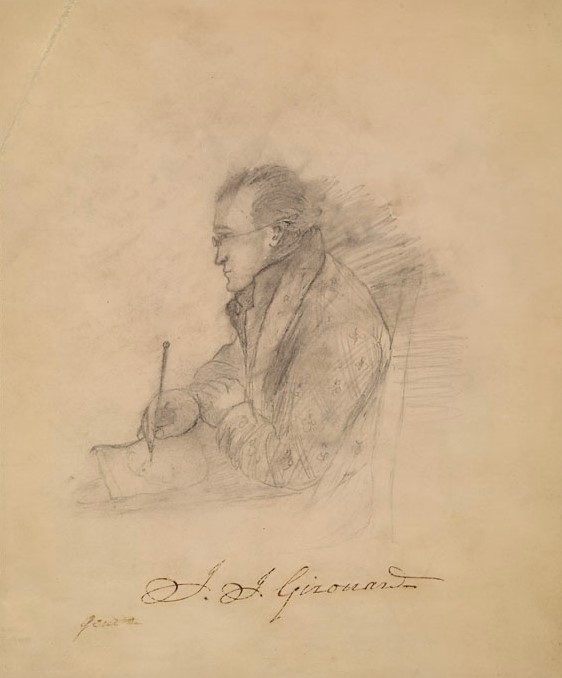
- Girouard self-portrait in prison, Montreal, 1837-1838
- Born: Jean-Joseph Girouard; November 13, 1794; Québec City, Québec
- Died: September 18, 1855 (aged 60); Saint-Benoît, Québec

Jean-Joseph Girouard (November 13, 1794 – September 18, 1855) was a notary and political figure in Lower Canada.

He was born at Quebec City in 1794, of Acadian descent, and lived with his grandfather, Jean Baillairgé, after his father's death in 1800. When Baillairgé died in 1805, his mother became the housekeeper for a parish priest, who also tutored the children. Girouard trained as a notary, qualified to practice in 1816 and set up practice at Saint-Benoît (later Mirabel). He also served as a volunteer in the militia during the War of 1812 and was named captain in 1821. In 1818, he married Marie-Louise Félix from the village of Saint-Benoît.

He resigned his position in the militia after a number of his friends were dismissed as militia officers because of their association with the Patriotes. Girouard was elected to the Legislative Assembly of Lower Canada for Deux-Montagnes in an 1831 by-election held after the death of Jacques Labrie and supported Louis-Joseph Papineau in the assembly. He supported the Ninety-Two Resolutions and was reelected in 1834. In 1837, his name was on a list of rebel leaders to be arrested. He escaped but later turned himself in after he heard that his supporters had already been arrested and was imprisoned at Montreal. He was released in July 1838 but imprisoned again following the uprisings later that year.

After his release, he retired from politics and returned to his profession as a notary. He married Émélie, the daughter of local notary Joseph-Amable Berthelot, in 1851. With his wife, he established the Hospice Youville, which provided education for young girls and care for the elderly, at Saint-Benoît. It was administered by the Sisters of Charity of the Hôpital Général in Montreal.

He died at Saint-Benoît in 1855.

His son Jean later served in the Legislative Council of Quebec. His son Joseph was a member of the Canadian House of Commons.

== Archives ==
There is a Jean-Joseph Girouard fonds at Library and Archives Canada. The material in the fonds dates from 1837 to 1838, and includes ninety-five artworks, the majority of which are portraits of patriots from the Rebellion of Lower Canada (1837-1838) drawn while Girouard was incarcerated in Montreal. There is also a view of the ruins of Saint-Benoît by Girouard; a portrait of Dr. J.-O. Chénier drawn by the notary André Jobin; and finally two lithographs by the patriot publisher Napoléon Aubin.
