= Jean-Baptiste-Isaïe Noël =

Canadian politician

Member of the Legislative Assembly of Lower Canada for Lotbinière
- In office 1830 – 1838 (two elections)
- Preceded by: New district – redistribution
- Succeeded by: None; constitution suspended

Member of the Legislative Assembly of the Province of Canada for Lotbinière
- In office 1841–1844
- Preceded by: New office
- Succeeded by: Joseph Laurin

Personal details
- Born: February 20, 1799 Saint-Antoine-de-Tilly
- Died: October 6, 1847 (aged 48) Saint-Antoine-de-Tilly
- Resting place: Saint-Antoine-de-Tilly
- Party: Lower Canada: Independent; Province of Canada: Anti-Unionist; French-Canadian Group
- Spouse: Marguerite Ryan
- Profession: Physician

Jean-Baptiste-Isaïe Noël (February 20, 1799 – October 6, 1847) was a seigneur, medical doctor and political figure in Lower Canada (now Quebec). He represented Lotbinière in the Legislative Assembly of Lower Canada from 1830 to 1838, and again in the Lotbinière electoral district in the Legislative Assembly of the Province of Canada from 1841 to 1844.

In the Lower Canada Assembly he was an independent, sometimes voting with the nationalist Parti patriote and sometimes with the Bureaucrats Party, which supported the Governor. In 1834 he voted with the Patiotes in supporting the Ninety-Two Resolutions, which were strongly critical of the British colonial government.

He opposed the union of Lower Canada with Upper Canada, but successfully stood for election to the Legislative Assembly of the Province of Canada in 1841. In the Assembly he generally was part of the French-Canadian Group which opposed the policies of the governors. However, in a major dispute in 1843, he broke with them and sided with Governor General Metcalfe. He was defeated in the general election of 1844.

== Early life and family ==
He was born in Saint-Antoine-de-Tilly, the son of seigneur Jean-Baptiste Noël de Tilly and Marie-Josephte Boudreau. In 1814, he inherited the seigneuries of Tilly and Bonsecours; in the same year, he acquired the seigneury of Duquet. He studied medicine and qualified to practise in 1828. Noël married Marguerite Ryan in 1831.

== Political career ==
=== Lower Canada ===
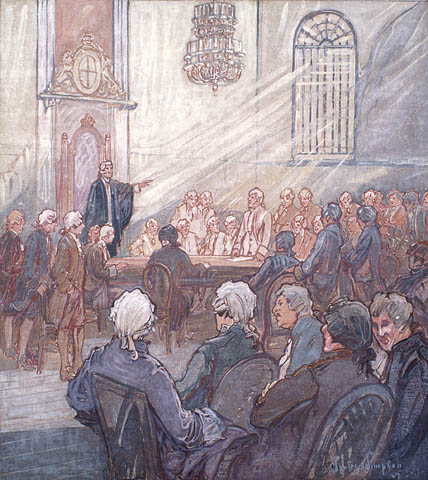
Legislative Assembly of Lower Canada, meeting in the Bishop's Chapel, Quebec

In 1830, Noël was elected to the Legislative Assembly of Lower Canada. He sometimes aligned with the Parti patriote, the nationalist party which opposed the British government of Lower Canada, but other times voted with the Bureaucrats Party, which supported the governors appointed by the British government. In 1834, he voted in support of the Ninety-Two Resolutions, which criticised the British colonial government of Lower Canada and called for reforms. He was re-elected in 1834, but lost the position in 1838, when the British government suspended the provincial constitution after the Lower Canada Rebellion of 1838.

=== Province of Canada ===
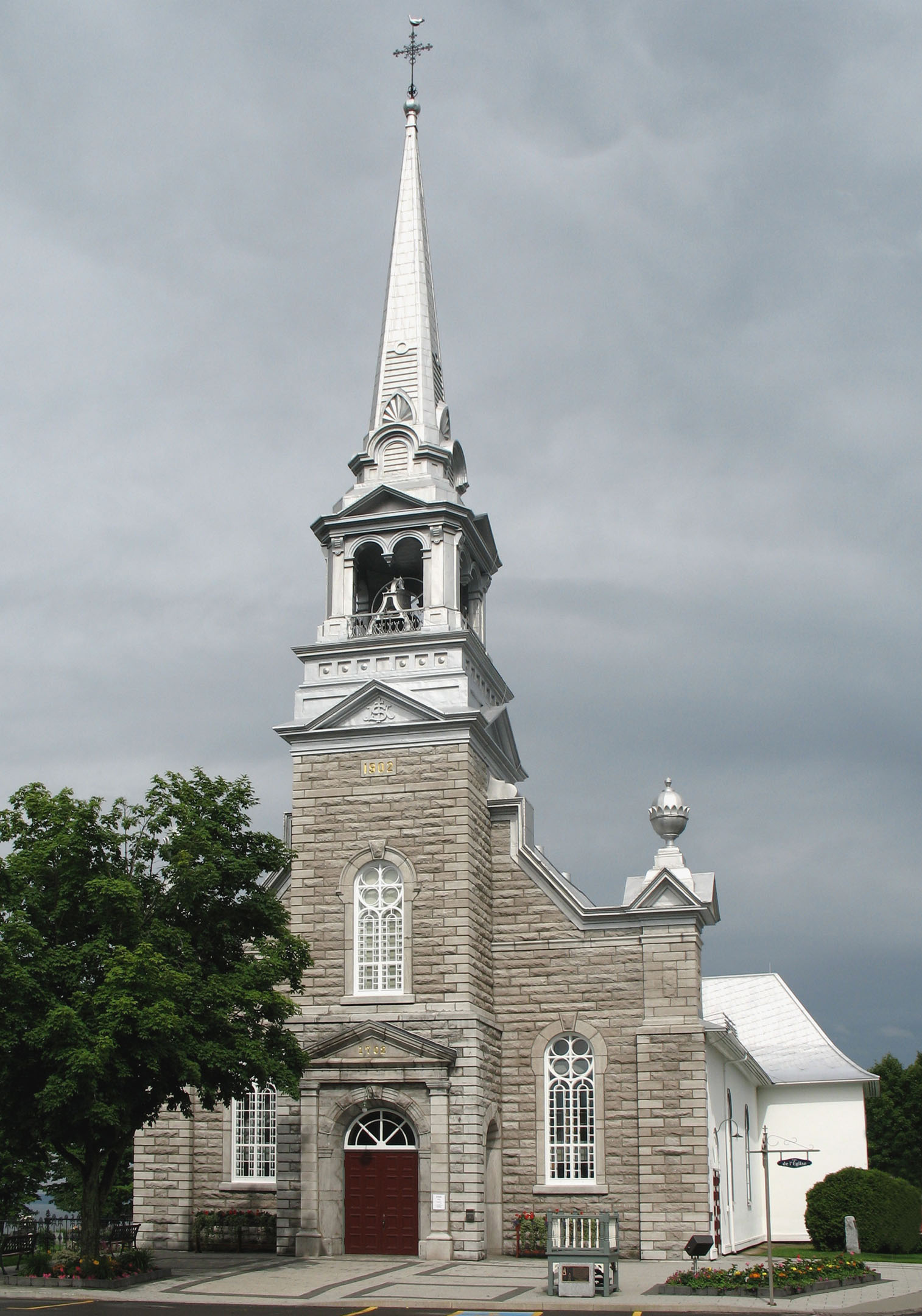
Saint-Antoine-de-Tilly parish church, where Noël was baptised and also buried

Following the rebellion in Lower Canada, and the similar rebellion in 1837 in Upper Canada (now Ontario), the British government decided to merge the two provinces into a single province, as recommended by Lord Durham in the Durham Report. The Union Act, 1840, passed by the British Parliament, abolished the two provinces and their separate parliaments, and created the Province of Canada, with a single parliament for the entire province, composed of an elected Legislative Assembly and an appointed Legislative Council. The Governor General retained a strong position in the government.

Noël stood for election unopposed to the new Legislative Assembly, for the constituency of Lotbinière, and was elected by acclamation. In the first session of the new Parliament, Noël opposed the union of Upper and Lower Canada into the new province. In the first and second sessions, he was a member of the Groupe canadien-français from Lower Canada, which generally opposed the policies of Governor General Lord Sydenham.

In the third session, Noël continued to be a member of the reform-minded Groupe canadien-français, and supported the first Reform ministry of Louis-Hippolyte Lafontaine and Robert Baldwin. However, in 1843 Lafontaine and Baldwin resigned in a dispute with Governor General Metcalfe, over Metcalfe's assertion that he could make government appointments without consulting the members of the ministry. The resignation was one of the first tests of the concept of responsible government desired by reformers, namely that the governor should take the advice of the elected members of the government. In a vote in the Assembly following the resignation, Noël was one of three members of the Groupe canadien-français which supported Governor Metcalfe, not Lafontaine and Baldwin.

As a result of the dispute, Metcalfe prorogued the Parliament for over a year. In 1844, a general election was held. Noël was defeated in Lotbinière by a Reformer, Joseph Laurin, part of a general increase in supporters of Lafontaine.

== Death ==
Noël died at Saint-Antoine-de-Tilly in 1847 at the age of 48. He was buried from the same parish church where he had been baptized.

== See also ==
1st Parliament of the Province of Canada
