= Jacques Labrie =

Canadian politician

Jacques Labrie (January 4, 1784 – October 26, 1831) was a medical doctor and political figure in Lower Canada.

He was born at Saint-Charles in 1784, the son of farmer Jacques Nau, dit Labry, and studied at the Petit Séminaire de Québec. He studied medicine with François Blanchet and completed his medical training at Edinburgh in Scotland. Labrie was also editor for the Courier de Québec from 1806 to 1808. He set up practice first at Montreal and then at Saint-Eustache. In 1809, he married Marie-Marguerite Gagnier, the daughter of the local notary at Saint-Eustache. Labrie served as surgeon for the militia during the War of 1812. He founded two schools, one for girls and one for boys, in his parish. In 1827, he was elected to the Legislative Assembly of Lower Canada for York, as a supporter of the parti patriote. He was elected for the new riding of Deux-Montagnes in 1830 after York was split up.

He died of pneumonia at Saint-Eustache in 1831 while still in office.

Labrie had written but not completed a history of Canada, which was deposited for safe-keeping in the library of Jean-Joseph Girouard. The manuscript was destroyed by fire during the Lower Canada Rebellion.

His daughter Zéphirine married Jean-Olivier Chénier, a leader of the Patriotes.
