= Robert Hoyle =

Canadian politician

Robert Hoyle (September 16, 1781 – February 15, 1857) was a businessman and political figure in Lower Canada.

He was born in Lancashire, England in 1781 and came to New York state in 1806. Hoyle supplied lumber to Lower Canada. After he declared loyalty to Britain during the War of 1812, he was forced to abandon his property there and he settled in the Richelieu valley near Lacolle. His brother Henry was leasing the seigneury of Lacolle. Hoyle became involved in farming and the lumber trade there. He also operated a ferry service across the Richelieu River. Hoyle served in the local militia, becoming lieutenant-colonel during the Lower Canada Rebellion, and also served as justice of the peace. He was elected to the Legislative Assembly of Lower Canada for L'Acadie in 1834. He voted against the Ninety-Two Resolutions. In 1832, he married Elizabeth B. Nye, who was the sister of some important local merchants; his first wife Pamelia Wright had died seven years earlier. In 1834, he was named customs collector at Stanstead and, in 1835, registrar for L'Acadie County. Hoyle retired from his duties as customs collector in 1844. He died at Lacolle in 1857 and was buried in Champlain, New York.
