= Charles Courteau =

Canadian politician

Charles Courteau (April 1787 – January 18, 1846) was a merchant and political figure in Lower Canada. He represented Leinster from 1824 to 1827 and Lachenaie from 1830 to 1838 in the Legislative Assembly of Lower Canada as a supporter of the Parti patriote.

He was born in Deschaillons, Quebec, the son of Julien Courteau and Marie-Anne Colle, and moved to Saint-Roch-de-l'Achigan with his family in 1799. Courteau was educated at the Collège de Montréal. He set up business in Saint-Roch and married Constance Bouchard in 1819. Courteau served in the local militia, reaching the rank of major. He was a commissioner for the trial of minor causes, a member of the school board, a member of the municipal council and a justice of the peace. He was an unsuccessful candidate for a seat in the legislative assembly in 1827. Courteau voted in support of the Ninety-Two Resolutions. He died at Saint-Roch-de-l'Achigan at the age of 58.
