= Rebecca Hoyle =

Applied mathematician and researcher

Rebecca Bryony Hoyle is a professor of applied mathematics at the University of Southampton, and associate dean for research at Southampton. She was the London Mathematical Society Mary Cartwright Lecturer for 2017.

== Research ==
Hoyle describes herself as an interdisciplinary mathematician working on dynamical processes in biology and social science. Her 2017 LMS Mary Cartwright Lecture, entitled Transgenerational plasticity and environmental change, illustrates her work in evolutionary biology but her research is broader than that, touching on diverse topics in applied mathematics including dynamic network analysis and industrial ecology.

She is the author of the book Pattern Formation: An Introduction to Methods (Cambridge University Press, 2006).

== Education and career ==
Hoyle read mathematics at the University of Cambridge, where she earned a bachelor's degree in 1989, took the Mathematical Tripos in 1990, and completed her Ph.D. in 1994. Her dissertation, Instabilities of Three Dimensional Patterns, was supervised by Michael Proctor.

After postdoctoral study at Northwestern University she returned to Cambridge as a research and teaching fellow, but after a brief stint at McKinsey & Company she moved to the University of Surrey in 2000. She moved again to Southampton in 2016.

== Awards ==
Hoyle won the inaugural Hedy Lamarr Prize in 2021, awarded by the Institute of Mathematics and its Applications for knowledge exchange in mathematics and its applications. Hoyle is a founding member of the Virtual Forum for Knowledge Exchange in Mathematical Sciences (V-KEMS) and was awarded the prize primarily for her role in setting up V-KEMS and for promoting effective knowledge exchange during the COVID-19 pandemic.
