= John Munn (shipbuilder) =

Canadian politician

John Munn (12 March 1788 – 20 March 1859) was a Scottish-born shipbuilder and political figure in Lower Canada.

He was born in Irvine, Scotland in 1788, the son of a sailor, also named John Munn, and came to Quebec City in 1801, where he began his career as a shipbuilder. In 1814, he went to Montreal, where he manufactured ships for the government. He set up his own shipbuilding business at Quebec in 1815. Many of the ships that he built were transported to Britain for sale. Munn, well known as a master craftsman, also trained a number of shipbuilders. He also helped found Queen's College at Kingston.

In 1837, he was elected to the Legislative Assembly of Lower Canada for the Lower Town of Quebec in a by-election held after George Vanfelson resigned his seat. He served on the city council for Quebec from 1840 to 1842. In 1845 and 1846, he built steamships for the People's Line of Steamers; when this company was unable to pay, Munn was forced to take back ownership of the ships. Because he had borrowed heavily from the Bank of British North America to finance their construction, this left Munn in a bad financial position and he was later forced to sell his shipyard and other properties.

He died at Quebec in 1859, where a small park bear his name in the Saint-Roch neighbourhood. It contains a sculpture that represents a ship and is called Le roi du fleuve (King of the River), John Munn's nick-name. Munn was buried in Mount Hermon Cemetery in Sillery.

== See also ==
- Jeanie Johnston
