= William Hoyle =

William Hoyle may refer to:

- William Hoyle (politician) (1842–1918), English-born furniture maker and politician in Ontario, Canada
- William Hoyle (temperance reformer) (1831–1886), British temperance reformer and vegetarian
- William Evans Hoyle (1855–1926), British zoologist
