= Charles Drolet =

Canadian politician

Charles Drolet (May 8, 1795 – September 22, 1873) was a Quebec lawyer and political figure.

He was born in Quebec City in 1795. He was admitted to the bar in 1827 and set up practice at Quebec City. In 1830, he married Marguerite, the daughter of Rémi Quirouet and the niece of François Quirouet. He was elected to the Legislative Assembly of Lower Canada for Saguenay County in an 1836 by-election held after the death of François-Xavier Tessier. He was a member of the Association des Frères-Chasseurs but did not participate in the armed resistance of 1837. In November 1838, he helped Patriote prisoners Edward Alexander Theller and William Wallin Dodge escape from the Citadel of Quebec. A warrant was issued for Drolet's arrest and he fled for the United States. Despite being captured at Saint-Gervais, he was able to escape and reach the United States. He was admitted to the New York bar in 1839 and then practiced at Detroit. He returned to Montreal after a general amnesty was proclaimed in 1849. In 1850, he was named clerk of the Court of Vice-Admiralty at Quebec. He was also named deputy clerk of the Court of Appeal in 1854.

He died at Quebec City in 1873.
