= Louis Raynaud, dit Blanchard =

Canadian politician

Louis Raynaud, dit Blanchard (March 1789 – August 9, 1868) was a farmer and political figure in Lower Canada. He represented Saint-Hyacinthe in the Legislative Assembly of Lower Canada from 1830 to 1838. His name also appears as Louis Renault Blanchard and Louis Reynaud, dit Blanchard.

He was born Pierre-Louis Blanchard in L'Assomption, Quebec, the son of Jean-Baptiste Blanchard and Magdeleine Payette, and settled at Saint-Hyacinthe. Raynaud, dit Blanchard was married twice: to Angélique Poulin in 1809 and to Marie Evé in 1857. He supported the Parti patriote in the legislative assembly and voted in support of the Ninety-Two Resolutions. A local leader of the Lower Canada Rebellion, a warrant was issued for his arrest in December 1837 and he fled to the United States, returning after a general amnesty was granted in June 1838. In 1844, Raynaud, dit Blanchard was named a commissioner for the trial of minor causes; however, he never swore the required oath and resigned in 1848. In 1856, he was named a lieutenant-colonel in the militia. He died at Saint-Hyacinthe at the age of 79.
