= Vital Têtu =

Canadian politician

Vital Têtu (February 15, 1799 – December 2, 1883) was a political figure in Lower Canada. He represented Montmorency in the Legislative Assembly of Lower Canada from 1836 until the suspension of the constitution in 1838.

He was born in Saint-Thomas, the son of François Têtu and Charlotte Bonenfant, was educated at the Petit Séminaire de Québec and worked as a clerk in the Lower Town of Quebec City before entering business on his own in 1826. In 1835, he married Virginie Ahier. Têtu was elected to the assembly in an 1836 by-election held after a second seat was added to Montmorency. From 1840 to 1842, he served as a member of the municipal council for Quebec City. Têtu was president of Assurance de Québec from 1866 to 1872. He died in Quebec City at the age of 84.

His uncle Félix Têtu also served in the assembly.
