= Gadabout (1914–1916 automobile) =

Defunct American motor vehicle manufacturer

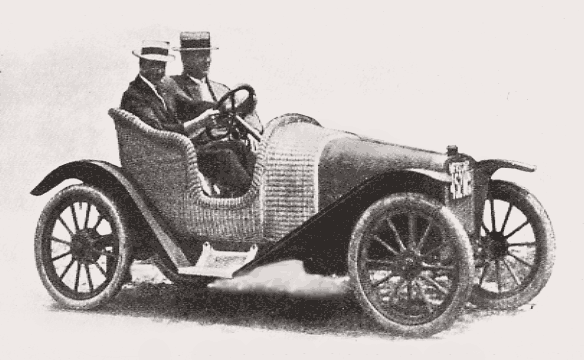
A 1914 Gadabout car with wickerwork body

The Gadabout was an American automobile from 1914 until 1916. A four-cylinder self-declared cyclecar, it had a body woven from so-called "waterproof reeds" (wicker) on a wooden frame. It has been described as "looking like a mobile wastepaper basket".

== History ==
First announced in August 1913, the car was manufactured by the Gadabout Motor Corporation. The company leased a building in Newark, New Jersey, on the southwest corner of Badger Avenue and Runyon Street, in the summer of 1914. The cars were marketed as Gadabouts. Walter Greunberg was the designer and Philip Heseltine the marketer. In 1915, the company moved to Detroit, Michigan (Lafayette Street). Production ended in 1916; many manufacturers of cyclecars were failing in the US since 1914. The Heseltine Motor Corporation is considered to be the successor to Gadabout, its cars were sold as Heseltines.

== Cars ==
The original 1914 car was a two-seater (side-by-side, so technically not a cyclecar) with right-hand steering, an 86-inch wheel base and a 46-inch wheel track. The car used a 12 horsepower four-cylinder Sterling motor, Schebler carburetor, and a solid rear axle made by the Detroit Axle Company. The design features included magneto ignition and splash lubrication.

The 1916 model, shown at the Chicago Automobile Show in January, had dropped the wickework body and got a longer wheelbase of 104 inches.

== Sources ==
- Kimes, Beverly Rae; Clark, Henry A. (1989). Standard Catalog of American Cars, 1805-1942. Iola, Wis: Krause Publications. ISBN 0-87341-111-0.
- Kimes, Beverly Rae (1996). Standard Catalog of American Cars, 1805-1942. Iola, WI: Krause Publications. ISBN 0-87341-428-4.
- Georgano, G. N. (2000). The Beaulieu Encyclopedia of the Automobile. Chicago: Fitzroy Dearborn Publishers. ISBN 1-57958-293-1. OCLC 45369199.
- Wise, David Burgess (1992). The New Illustrated Encyclopedia of Automobiles. Quarto Inc. ISBN 1-55521-808-3.
