= Michel Godbout =

Canadian television news anchor

Michel Godbout is a Canadian television news anchor. From 2006 to 2009 he anchored CBC News: Montreal at Six for CBMT, since taking over for Dennis Trudeau in 2006. He studied journalism in New Brunswick where he also worked in community and private radio then joined Radio-Canada Télévision and played university hockey for the Moncton Blue Eagles. He moved to Manitobato continue to work as a journalist for Radio-Canada-RDI, before returning to Montreal in 1999 where he joined CBC Television.

After working as a reporter from 2000-2004 he became head news anchor for CBC News at Six. In September 2009, with the revamping of the newscast to a 90-minute format, Godbout became the senior correspondent for CBC News Montreal, working in the field as a special assignment reporter. In 2010 he moved to sports as CBC's sports journalist and anchor.

In August 2011, Godbout joined the newly created TVA Sports. He was the head anchor for sports news at 11:00pm.

Since 2014 he hosts the NHL broadcast on TVA Sports. He occasionally anchors newscasts at LCN and TVA.
