= Édouard Thibaudeau =

Canadian politician

- Born: 7 March 1797; Pointe-Claire, Quebec, Canada
- Died: 21 August 1836 (aged 39); Bonaventure, Quebec, Canada
- Other name: Édouard Thibodeau
- Occupations: lawyer, political figure
- Known for: member, Legislative Assembly of Lower Canada
- Political party: Parti patriote
- Parents: Louis Thibodeau (father); Marguerite Bro (mother)

Édouard Thibaudeau (March 7, 1797 – August 21, 1836) was a lawyer and political figure in Lower Canada. He represented Bonaventure in the Legislative Assembly of Lower Canada from 1830 to 1836. His surname also appears as Thibodeau.

He was born in Pointe-Claire, Quebec, the son of Louis Thibodeau and Marguerite Bro. Thibaudeau studied law in Montreal, was admitted to the bar in 1823 and set up practice in Gaspé. He served as inspector of schools for Gaspé and Bonaventure counties. Thibaudeau generally supported the Parti patriote but was not present for the session where the vote on the Ninety-Two Resolutions was held. He died in office in Bonaventure at the age of 39.
