= Jean-Charles Létourneau =

Canadian politician (1775–1838)

Jean-Charles Létourneau (November 28, 1775 – April 21, 1838) was a notary and political figure in Lower Canada.

He was born in Saint-Pierre-de-la-Rivière-du-Sud in 1775 and studied at the Petit Séminaire de Québec. Létourneau articled as a notary with Roger Lelièvre and later Nicolas-Gaspard Boisseau, qualifying to practice in 1803. He set up practice in the parish of Saint-Thomas at Montmagny and, in 1806, he married Catherine, Boisseau's daughter. Létourneau was named commissioner for several public works projects in the area. In 1827, Létourneau was elected to the Legislative Assembly of Lower Canada for Devon. He was elected to represent L'Islet in 1830 and 1834. He supported Louis-Joseph Papineau and voted for the Ninety-Two Resolutions.

He died at Saint-Thomas in 1838 after suffering a long illness.
