= Louis-Théodore Besserer =

Canadian politician

Louis-Théodore Besserer (January 4, 1785 – February 3, 1861) was a businessman, notary and political figure in Lower Canada.

He was born at Château-Richer, Quebec in 1785. He studied at the Petit Séminaire de Québec and later became a notary. During the War of 1812, he was a lieutenant in the Quebec City militia, later becoming captain. He represented Quebec County in the Legislative Assembly of Lower Canada from 1833 to 1838. He supported the Ninety-Two Resolutions, but preferred working through legal channels to rebellion. So, the British government saw him as a rebel, while the Parti patriote resented his moderate stance. In 1845, he retired to a large estate that he had purchased in Bytown. He subdivided this property and sold off building lots; this area is now the Ottawa neighbourhood of Sandy Hill. Besserer Street in this area was named after him.

He died at Ottawa in 1861.
