= John McConnell (Lower Canada politician) =

John McConnell (May 20, 1799 – 1856 or later) was a political figure in Canada East. He represented Stanstead in the Legislative Assembly of the Province of Canada from 1844 to 1851.

He was born in Hatley, Lower Canada, the son of Thomas McConnell, a native of New Hampshire, and Roxana Hovey. McConnell was a member of a citizen's committee formed to promote the construction of a railway from Montreal to Boston via Sherbrooke. He served in the militia, reaching the rank of lieutenant-colonel. In 1820, he married Alice Wadley. McConnell later became involved in the movement favouring annexation with the United States. He did not run for reelection to the assembly in 1851 and was defeated when he ran for reelection in 1854.
