= Édouard-Étienne Rodier =

Canadian politician

Édouard-Étienne Rodier (December 26, 1804 – February 5, 1840) was a lawyer and political figure in Lower Canada.

He was born Étienne-Édouard Rodier in Montreal in 1804, the son of a Montreal merchant, and studied at the Petit Séminaire de Montréal. He studied law with Hippolyte Saint-Georges Dupré and then Dominique-Benjamin Rollin; Rodier was called to the bar in 1827 and set up practice at Montreal. In 1826, he had married Julie-Victoire Dumont, the daughter of a cooper; she died in 1829. In 1831, he married Elise, the daughter of Benjamin Beaupré, a merchant at L'Assomption. Rodier moved to L'Assomption; he was elected to the Legislative Assembly of Lower Canada for that region in an 1832 by-election held after Barthélemy Joliette was appointed to the legislative council. Rodier was reelected in 1834. As a radical member of the parti patriote, he supported an elected legislative council, the creation of a French Canadian republic, the end of seigneurial tenure and ending trade with Great Britain. Rodier voted in support of the Ninety-Two Resolutions. He gave speeches in 1837 that encouraged armed revolt and was a leader in the Fils de la Liberté. After a riot in Montreal, a warrant was issued for his arrest. He was wounded in a clash in December and was brought to Swanton, Vermont. He took part in the preparation of a declaration of independence for Lower Canada in February 1838.

In October 1838, he returned his family and law practice in L'Assomption. He was branded by the remaining Patriotes as a traitor. He died at Montreal in 1840.

His cousin Charles-Séraphin Rodier later served as mayor of Montreal.
