= Alexis Godbout =

Canadian politician

Alexis Godbout (1799 – October 22, 1887) was a merchant and political figure in Quebec. He represented Orléans in the Legislative Assembly of Lower Canada from 1834 to 1838.

He was born at Saint-Pierre on the Île d'Orléans, the son of Pierre Godbout and Marie-Anne Leclerc. In 1830, he married Julie Gauvreau. Godbout was elected to the legislative assembly in an 1834 by-election held after François Quirouet was named to the legislative council. He voted in support of the Ninety-Two Resolutions. In 1856, Godbout was named registrar for Dorchester County, serving in that post until 1868. He died at Lac-Etchemin at the age of 88.
