= Jean Bouffard =

Canadian politician

Jean Bouffard (1800 – December 1, 1843) was a notary and political figure in Lower Canada. He represented Dorchester in the Legislative Assembly of Lower Canada from 1832 to 1838.

He was born at Saint-Laurent on Île d'Orléans, the son of Jean Bouffard and Marie Noël. Bouffard apprenticed as a notary at Saint-Henri-de-Lauzon and set up practice there after qualifying to practice in 1830. In 1831, he married Catherine Pepin dit Lachance. He was named school inspector for Dorchester County in 1832 and commissioner for the Court of Minor Causes in 1837. Bouffard was first elected to the provincial assembly in an 1832 by-election held after the death of Louis Lagueux. He voted in support of the Ninety-Two Resolutions. He died at Saint-Henri-de-Lauzon at the age of 42.
