= Joseph-Toussaint Drolet =

Canadian politician

Joseph-Toussaint Drolet (October 31, 1786 – October 31, 1838) was a merchant, seigneur and political figure in Lower Canada. He represented Verchères in the Legislative Assembly of Lower Canada from 1832 to 1838 as a supporter of the Parti patriote.

He was born in Saint-Marc-sur-Richelieu, Quebec, the son of Joseph-Charles Drolet and Brigitte Raynault, dit Blanchard. He entered business at Saint-Marc-sur-Richelieu with his father and later took over the operation of the business. He served as a captain in the militia during the War of 1812, later becoming major. He married Sophie Boileau, the daughter of René Boileau. In 1825, Drolet acquired the seigneury of Cournoyer (also known as Saint-Marc). He was named a commissioner in charge of improving navigation on the Richelieu River in 1829. He was first elected to the legislative assembly in an 1832 by-election held after François-Xavier Malhiot was named to the legislative council. Drolet voted in support of the Ninety-Two Resolutions. A local leader in the Lower Canada Rebellion, he was arrested in December 1837 and released in June the following year. Drolet died in his residence at Saint-Marc-sur-Richelieu at the age of 52.

His daughter Lucille married Louis Giard, later a key official in the field of education in Quebec.
