= François-Xavier Tessier =

Canadian politician

François-Xavier Tessier (September 15, 1799 – December 24, 1835) was a medical doctor, publisher, and political figure in Lower Canada.

He was born in the town of Quebec in 1799. He studied medicine for several years and was qualified to practice as a surgeon in 1820. At the recommendation of the medical board of examiners, he studied medicine at a university in New York and was qualified as a doctor in 1823. In the same year, he was named apothecary for the Quebec Emigrant Hospital. In 1824, he was named assistant surgeon for the militia. In 1826, he established a bimonthly medical publication, Quebec Medical Journal/Journal de médecine de Québec; it was published until the fall of 1827. He helped found the Quebec Medical Society in 1826 and later served as its president.

Tessier lived in New York City from 1828 to 1830, where he contributed to a local newspaper. In 1830, he returned to Quebec where he was named health officer for the port. Tessier was also named administrator for a new hospital at Pointe-Lévy. He was fired from his posts at Quebec following the cholera epidemic of 1832; this may have been at least partly due to Tessier's politics. In 1831, Tessier was elected to the Quebec boards of medical examiners. He was elected to the Legislative Assembly of Lower Canada for Saguenay in an 1833 by-election held after the death of Joseph-Isidore Bédard; he was reelected in 1834. Tessier supported the parti patriote and voted in support of the Ninety-Two Resolutions. In 1834, he was selected as physician for the Marine and Emigrant Hospital. He had also taught medicine and set up a clinic to vaccinate against smallpox in his home.

He died in office at Quebec City in 1835.
