= George Vanfelson =

Canadian politician and judge (1784–1856)

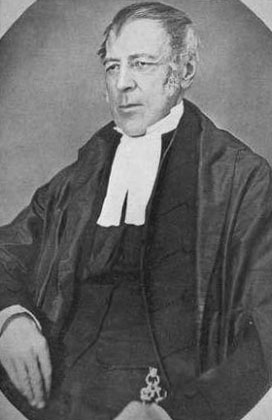
George VanFelson

George Vanfelson, QC (April 23, 1784 – February 16, 1856) was a lawyer, judge and political figure in Lower Canada.

He was born in Quebec City in 1784, of German descent, and studied law with Jean-Antoine Panet. He was called to the bar in 1805. Vanfelson was a captain in the militia during the War of 1812. He was elected to the Legislative Assembly of Lower Canada for the Upper Town of Quebec in an 1815 by-election held after Jean-Antoine Panet was named to the Legislative Council; he was reelected in 1816. He was named advocate general for the province in 1819 and served in that position until 1832. Vanfelson was elected for the Lower Town of Quebec in an 1832 by-election held after the death of Thomas Lee; he was reelected in 1834. He supported the Ninety-Two Resolutions but became a moderate Patriote, becoming the leader of this group when Elzéar Bédard was appointed judge.

Vanfelson retired from politics in 1837, disturbed by the increasing animosity in the assembly. He became a Queen's Counsel in 1843 and was named inspector of police for Montreal later that year. In 1849, he was named to the Superior Court of Lower Canada at Montreal and served until his death at Montreal in 1856.

His sister Josette married Louis Gauvreau, who also served in the legislative assembly.
