= Moses French Colby =

Lower Canada doctor and politician (1795-1863)

- Born: July 2, 1795 [Thornton, New Hampshire]]
- Died: May 4, 1863 (aged 67)
- Education: Yale College; Dartmouth College; Harvard College
- Children: Charles Carroll Colby

Moses French Colby (July 2, 1795 – May 4, 1863) was a medical doctor and politician in Lower Canada.

He was born in Thornton, New Hampshire in 1795 but moved to Derby, Vermont with his family in 1798. He studied medicine with the local doctor there, then went on to further medical studies at Yale College and Dartmouth College. He returned to Derby to practice. In 1828, he studied anatomy at Harvard College. In 1832, after qualifying as a physician in Lower Canada, Colby moved to Stanstead. Besides practicing medicine, he also contributed to medical journals and produced his own remedies. He was elected to the Legislative Assembly of Lower Canada for Stanstead in an 1837 by-election and served until March 27, 1838, when the province was put under the rule of a special council after the Lower Canada Rebellion. He ran unsuccessfully in 1841 for a seat in the Legislative Assembly of the Province of Canada. In 1847, he was named surgeon for the local militia regiment. He died at Stanstead in 1863.

His son, Charles Carroll Colby, later represented Stanstead in the Canadian House of Commons.
