= Nicolas Boissonnault =

Canadian politician

Nicolas Boissonnault (ca 1793 – February 6, 1862) was a merchant and political figure in Quebec. He represented Hertford from 1824 to 1830 and Bellechasse from 1830 to 1838 in the Legislative Assembly of Lower Canada.

He was the son of Nicolas Boissonnault and Marie McClin. Boissonnault lived at Saint-Michel-de-Bellechasse and later at Quebec City. In 1817, he married Madeleine Mathurin. Boissonault owned sawmills at Saint-Vallier and Saint-Thomas, selling them to William Price in 1831 but remaining on as manager. He supported the Parti patriote in the legislative assembly and voted in support of the Ninety-Two Resolutions. He died at New Richmond.
