= Ninety-Two Resolutions =

Resolutions of Lower Canada Assembly, 1834

The Ninety-Two Resolutions were drafted by Louis-Joseph Papineau and other members of the Parti patriote of Lower Canada in 1834. The resolutions were a long series of demands for political reforms in the British-governed colony.

Papineau had been elected speaker of the Legislative Assembly of Lower Canada in 1815. His party constantly opposed the unelected colonial government, and in 1828 he helped draft an early form of the resolutions, essentially a list of grievances against the colonial administration. To ensure that the views of the Legislative Assembly be understood by the British House of Commons, the Parti patriote had sent its own delegation to London in order to submit a memoir and a petition signed by 78,000 people.

On February 17, 1834, Elzéar Bédard introduced the Ninety-Two Resolutions in the Assembly. Papineau provided most of the arguments for the Resolutions in the subsequent debates. The Resolutions proved divisive, with some moderate supporters of the Parti patriote voting against them, such as John Neilson and Frédéric-Auguste Quesnel. The Assembly nonetheless approved the Resolutions by a large margin, 56–23, on February 21, 1834. The Assembly then sent the Resolutions to London. The resolutions included, among other things, demands for an elected Legislative Council and an Executive Council responsible before the house of representatives. Under the Constitutional Act of 1791, Lower Canada was given an elected legislative assembly, but members of the upper house were appointed by the governor of the colony.

In the resolutions, the elected representatives once again reiterated their loyalty to the British Crown but expressed frustration that the government of London had been unwilling to correct the injustices caused by the past governments of the colony.

In response, the British government appointed the Royal Commission for the Investigation of all Grievances Affecting His Majesty's Subjects of Lower Canada, chaired by the Governor, the Earl of Gosford, which produced several reports on the issues raised by the Resolutions. Meanwhile, the Legislative Assembly did all it could to oppose the un-elected upper houses while avoiding outright rebellion. Home Secretary Lord John Russell eventually responded to them by issuing ten resolutions of his own (the Russell Resolutions). All of the Legislative Assembly's demands were rejected.

The ten resolutions reached Canada in 1837, and many of Papineau's reformists began to agitate for a rebellion. See the Lower Canada Rebellion.
