= Pierre Bureau =

Canadian politician (1771–1836)

Pierre Bureau (October 9, 1771 – June 6, 1836) was a businessman and political figure in Lower Canada.

He was born in L’Ancienne-Lorette, Quebec in 1771. Bureau operated an inn for travellers at Sainte-Anne-de-la-Pérade and a ferry service across the Sainte-Anne River. Around 1811, he moved to Trois-Rivières, where he became a merchant. He was elected to the Legislative Assembly of Lower Canada for Saint-Maurice in an 1819 by-election and represented that region until his death at Trois-Rivières in 1836. He supported an elected Legisliative Council and tended to support the Parti canadien. Bureau voted in support of the Ninety-Two Resolutions.

His grandsons, Antoine-Aimé Dorion and Jean-Baptiste-Éric Dorion, both became members of the Legislative Assembly of the Province of Canada. Antoine-Aimé was also a lawyer, judge and Canadian cabinet minister; Jean-Baptiste-Éric was a journalist.

Political offices
Preceded by Louis Gugy, Tory; Étienne Mayrand, Tory	MLA, District of Saint-Maurice; 1819–1836; With: Étienne Mayrand, Tory; Louis Picotte, Parti Canadien; Charles Caron, Parti Canadien; Valère Guillet, Parti Canadien	Succeeded by Alexis Bareil, dit Lajoie, Patriote; François Lesieur Desaulniers, Patriote
