= François Lesieur Desaulniers =

Canadian politician (1785–1870)

Personal details
- Born: 1785 Yamachiche, Province of Quebec
- Died: August 7, 1870 (aged 84–85) Yamachiche, Quebec
- Children: Louis-Léon Lesieur Desaulniers

François Lesieur Desaulniers (1785 – August 7, 1870) was a Quebec farmer and political figure.

He was born in Yamachiche in 1785. He served as lieutenant-colonel in the local militia. In 1805, he married Charlotte, the daughter of Augustin Rivard, who represented Saint-Maurice in the legislative assembly from 1792 to 1796. Desaulniers was elected to the Legislative Assembly of Lower Canada for Saint-Maurice in an 1836 by-election as a member of the parti patriote. He was elected to the Legislative Assembly of the Province of Canada for the same region in 1844.

He died at Yamachiche in 1870.

His son Louis-Léon was a member of the Canadian House of Commons.

Political offices
Preceded by Valère Guillet, Patriote; Pierre Bureau, Patriote	MLA, District of Saint-Maurice; 1836–1838; With: Alexis Bareil, dit Lajoie, Patriote	Vacant Constitution suspended in 1838
Preceded by Joseph-Édouard Turcotte, Moderate Reformer	MLA, District of Saint-Maurice; 1844–1848	Succeeded by Louis-Joseph Papineau, Radical Reformer
