= Étienne Mayrand =

Canadian politician (1776–1872)

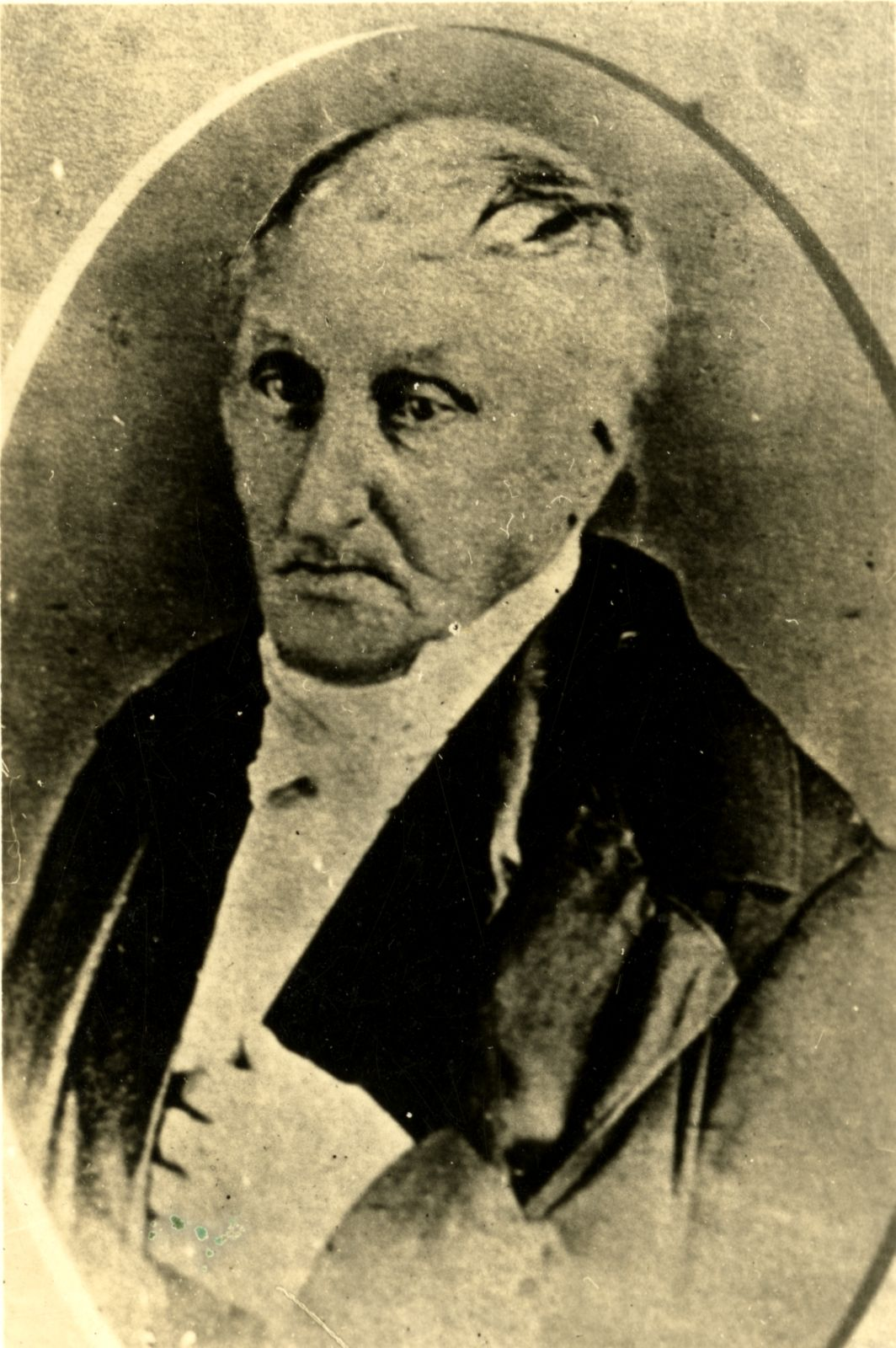
Portrait of Étienne Mayrand, around 1860

Étienne Mayrand (September 3, 1776 – January 22, 1872) was a Quebec businessman and political figure.

He was born in Montreal in 1776 and went on to work in the fur trade with the North West Company. He established a business in grain and hay at Rivière-du-Loup (later Louiseville in Maskinongé County), also expanding into real estate and money lending. Mayrand served in the militia as an officer during the War of 1812, becoming captain and, in 1846, major. He also held several posts as commissioner in Lower Canada. He was elected to the Legislative Assembly of Lower Canada for Saint-Maurice County in 1816. Mayrand served as a member of the Special Council which governed the province following the Lower Canada Rebellion and was named to the Legislative Council of the Province of Canada in June 1841. He resigned from the council later that same month.

He was married four times:

- first to a native woman, who bore him two daughters, during his time with the North West Company
- then, to Sophie Héneau from Berthier
- thirdly, to Thérèse Heney at Montreal
- finally, to Félicité Le Maitre-Bellenoix, the widow of Louis Gauvreau, a Quebec merchant

He died in Rivière-du-Loup (Louiseville) in 1872.

His grandson, Hormidas Mayrand, later served in the Canadian House of Commons.

Political offices
Preceded by Étienne Le Blanc, Parti Canadien; Joseph-Rémi Vallières de Saint-Réal, Parti Canadien	MLA, District of Saint-Maurice; 1816–1920; With: Louis Gugy, Tory; Pierre Bureau, Parti Canadien	Succeeded by Louis Picotte, Parti Canadien; Pierre Bureau, Parti Canadien
