= Michel Caron (politician) =

Canadian politician (1763–1831)

Michel Caron (January 14, 1763 – December 26, 1831) was a political figure in Lower Canada. He represented Saint-Maurice in the Legislative Assembly of Lower Canada from 1804 to 1814. He signed his name as Michel Caront.

He was born in Saint-Roch-des-Aulnaies, the son of Michel Caron and Marie-Josephte Parent. He married Marie-Anne Trahan, who was of Acadian descent, in 1767. In 1783, he settled on property in the seigneury of Yamachiche which had been acquired by his father and was known as the village of the Carons. In 1812, Caron was named a commissioner for the purpose of taking the oath of allegiance for Yamachiche parish. He was part of a group of singers known as the "Chantres de Machiche". Caron was named a justice of the peace. He did not run for reelection to the assembly in 1814. Caron died in Yamachiche at the age of 67.

His brothers Charles and François also served in the assembly.

Political offices
Preceded by Thomas Coffin, Tory, Mathew Bell, Tory	MLA, District of Saint-Maurice; 1804–1814; With: David Monro, Tory, Louis Gugy, Tory, Thomas Coffin, Tory; François Caron, Parti Canadien	Succeeded by Joseph-Rémi Vallières de Saint-Réal, Parti Canadien; Étienne Le Blanc, Parti Canadien
