= Charles Caron =

Canadian politician (1768–1853)

Charles Caron (January 3, 1768 – January 30, 1853) was a farmer and political figure in Lower Canada. He signed his name Charle Caront.

He was born Charles-François Caron in Saint-Roch-des-Aulnaies in 1768. Caron began farming on land purchased by his father in the seigneury of Yamachiche and also acquired additional land himself. In 1794, he married Françoise, the daughter of Augustin Rivard. He was elected to the Legislative Assembly of Lower Canada for Saint-Maurice in 1824 and reelected in 1827. Caron was defeated in the general election held in 1830. He was part of a group of singers known as the "Chantres de Machiche".

He died at Yamachiche in 1853.

His brothers Michel and François also represented Saint-Maurice in the assembly. His daughter Victoire married André Gérin-Lajoie; their son Charles later became a member of the Canadian House of Commons.

Political offices
Preceded by Louis Picotte, Parti Canadien; Pierre Bureau, Parti Canadien	MLA, District of Saint-Maurice; 1824–1830; With: Pierre Bureau, Parti Canadien	Succeeded by Valère Guillet, Parti Canadien; Pierre Bureau, Parti Canadien
