= Augustin Rivard =

Canadian politician

Augustin-Amable Rivard Dufresne (1743 – May 5, 1798) was a farmer and political figure in Lower Canada.

He was born either Augustin-Amable Rivard dit Dufresne, or Augustin-Amable Laglanderie Dufresne, depending on the source of information at Yamachiche March 11, 1742 or 1743, the son of farmer Joseph Laglanderie Dufresne (Rivard). He settled on land inherited from his parents in the seigneury of Gatineau. Rivard was named a sub-baillif at Yamachiche in 1767. He was elected to the 1st Parliament of Lower Canada for Saint-Maurice in 1792. Rivard had a wooden leg due to an earlier accident. It should be mentioned that the Rivard family does not generally associate the Laglanderie name with Augsustin-Amable, or his father Joseph, but other branches of the Rivard family did have Laglanderie as a dit name, and some adopted it as a surname in place of Rivard.

Augustin Rivard was the 6th and final child of Joseph Rivard dit Dufresne and Marie Toutant, and was the Great Grandson of Nicolas Rivard dit Lavigne, the first member of the Rivard family to immigrate to Canada in 1648. The Rivard family goes back to Tourouvre, France, which is located in Lower Normandy and part of the modern day Orne department. Thomas RIvard is the earliest known male ancestor of Augustin-Amable Rivard dit Dufresne.

Augustine-Amable Rivard dit Dufresne died at Yamachiche, but the official records do not agree on the date of his death. 5 May 1798 and 6 March 1809 are listed as the date of death on official church and government documents, with the 1798 date being the more likely of the two.

His daughter Marie-Charlotte married François Lesieur Desaulniers, who later also represented Saint-Maurice in the legislative assembly; their son Louis-Léon Lesieur Desaulniers later became a member of the Canadian House of Commons. Rivard's daughter Françoise married Charles Caron, who also became a member of the legislative assembly.

Augustin-Amable is also survived (via his sons) by numerous other descendants in the United States and Canada, including Oscar and Marius Dufresne, who were notable Quebecois Entrepreneurs and the origins of the historic Château Dufresne in Montreal. Oscar and Marius were Great-Great-Great Grandsons of Augustin-Amable Rivard dit Dufresne. Many of Augustin-Amable's American descendants are concentrated in the upper Midwest, with large concentrations in Minnesota and Wisconsin.

== See also ==
- Tourouvre Wikipedia entry for Tourouvre France, the ancestral homeland of the Rivard family.

Political offices
Preceded by Parliamentary system established in 1792	MLA, District of Saint-Maurice; 1792–1796; With: Thomas Coffin, Tory	Succeeded by Nicholas Montour, Tory; Thomas Coffin, Tory
