= Saint-Maurice (Lower Canada electoral district) =

Lower Canada electoral district

Defunct pre-Confederation electoral district
- Legislature: Legislative Assembly of Lower Canada
- District created: 1792
- District abolished: 1838
- First contested: 1792
- Last contested: 1836

Under the Constitutional Act of 1791, the district of Saint-Maurice was established. Its boundaries, which roughly covered the current Mauricie area except for the city of Trois-Rivières, were reduced when the district of Champlain was created in 1829.

Saint-Maurice was represented simultaneously by two Members at the Legislative Assembly of Lower Canada.

== Members for Saint-Maurice (1792-1838) ==
Name	Party	Election
Thomas Coffin	Tory Party	1792
Thomas Coffin	Tory Party	1796
Thomas Coffin	Tory Party	1800
David Monro	Tory Party	1804
Thomas Coffin	Tory Party	1808
Louis Gugy	Tory Party	1809
François Caron	Parti Canadien	1810
Joseph-Rémi Vallières de Saint-Réal	Parti Canadien	1814
Louis Gugy	Tory Party	1816
Pierre Bureau	Parti Canadien	1819
Pierre Bureau	Parti Canadien	Spring 1820
Pierre Bureau	Parti Canadien	Summer 1820
Pierre Bureau	Parti Canadien	1824
Pierre Bureau	Parti Canadien	1827
Pierre Bureau	Parti Canadien	1830
Pierre Bureau	Parti Patriote	1834
Alexis Bareil, dit Lajoie	Parti Patriote	1836
Name	Party	Election
Augustin Rivard-Dufresne	Parti Canadien	1792
Nicholas Montour	Tory Party	1796
Mathew Bell	Tory Party	1800
Michel Caron	Parti Canadien	1804
Michel Caron	Parti Canadien	1808
Michel Caron	Parti Canadien	1809
Michel Caron	Parti Canadien	1810
Étienne Le Blanc	Parti Canadien	1814
Étienne Mayrand	Tory Party	1816
Louis Picotte	Parti Canadien	Spring 1820
Louis Picotte	Parti Canadien	Summer 1820
Charles Caron	Parti Canadien	1824
Charles Caron	Parti Canadien	1827
Valère Guillet	Parti Canadien	1830
Valère Guillet	Parti Patriote	1834
François Lesieur Desaulniers	Parti Patriote	1836

== See also ==
- History of Canada
- History of Quebec
- Mauricie
- Politics of Canada
- Politics of Quebec
- Saint-Maurice—Champlain Federal Electoral District
- Saint-Maurice (Quebec provincial electoral district)
- Saint-Maurice (electoral district in Canada East)
- Shawinigan
