= Louis Gugy =

Canadian politician

Lt.-Colonel The Hon. Jean-Georges-Barthélemy-Guillaume-Louis Gugy (January 1770 – July 17, 1840) represented Saint-Maurice in the Legislative Assembly of Lower Canada and the Legislative Council of Lower Canada. In his early years at Trois-Rivières he was Justice of the Peace, Colonel of the militia and Sheriff. On entering politics he came to Montreal where he was appointed Sheriff and was elected the first president of the Montreal Mechanics' Institution (now the Atwater Library of the Mechanics' Institute of Montreal). He inherited five seigneuries from his uncle, Conrad Gugy.

== Early life ==
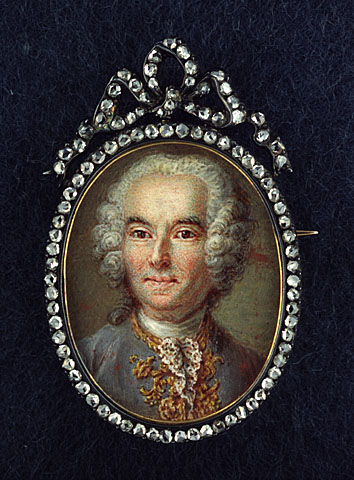
Colonel Barthélemy Gugy (1737–1797), father of Louis Gugy

Known as Louis Gugy, he was born in Paris in 1770. He was the son of Colonel Barthélemy Gugy (1737–1797) and his Swiss-French Huguenot wife, Jeanne Elizabeth Teissier de la Tour (who died at an advanced age in Montreal), the granddaughter of Antoine de Teissier (b.1667), 1st Baron of Marguerittes in the Languedoc. Though Swiss and the son of an officer in the Dutch service, Louis's father had joined the armies of the King of France. He served with distinction, was knighted, and at the breaking out of the French Revolution, was Colonel commandant of the 2nd Regiment of Swiss Guards in the French Royal Service, that corps being the personal bodyguards of King Louis XVI during the revolution.

As a young man, Louis served in France as a Lieutenant under his father during the revolution. Following the overthrow of the King Louis XVI, both father and son were offered advancement in the French revolutionary army, and most brilliant prospects were held out to them. They declined these offers, and Louis' father had the honor of marching his regiment from Paris back to Switzerland without losing a man. Considering that the elder Gugy's men were disarmed, exposed to all manner of seductions, supplied by wine and allured by women, this feat certainly indicated the respect and regard in which he was held.

On reaching the Swiss Frontier, the elder Gugy found himself penniless. Resolving to sell his horses, he requested that a non-commissioned officer of his regiment enquire for purchasers. One of the interested parties was a French cavalry officer, but Louis Gugy interceded before the purchase of one of the horses could go ahead, revealing to his father that the purchaser was none other than Jérôme Pétion de Villeneuve, the servant at the inn of Varennes who had recognised and betrayed King Louis XVI. In an outburst of ruthless loyalty, and costing himself the price of a horse, the elder Gugy shot the animal so that it could never fall into the hands of a traitor, a trait that he detested.

== Life in Lower Canada ==
From 1792 to 1794, he lived in Switzerland; Gugy then went to Quebec City on inheriting his uncle Conrad Gugy's seigneuries of Grandpré and Dumontier and part of the seigneury of Yamachiche, Quebec.

He returned to Quebec in 1795 and settled at Yamachiche. Gugy inherited the seigneuries after his father's death in 1797. In 1799, he moved to Trois-Rivières. He was named a justice of the peace for Trois-Rivières district in 1803 and was appointed sheriff in 1805. Gugy served as an officer in the local militia, becoming lieutenant-colonel in 1813. He also served as commissioner for several public works projects in the region.

In 1809, he was elected to the Legislative Assembly of Lower Canada for Saint-Maurice. He was elected again in 1816 and he was named to the Legislative Council in 1818. In 1827, he was named sheriff for Montreal. In 1828 he became the first president of the Montreal Mechanics' Institution (now the Atwater Library of the Mechanics' Institute of Montreal). On April 21, 1835, Gugy also became the first president of the newly founded German Society of Montreal. Gugy was accused of favouring the English party by the Parti canadien after three supporters of Daniel Tracey were killed during an 1832 by-election held in Montreal West. In 1836, he was accused of fraud and negligence by an assembly committee and he was removed from his post as sheriff in 1837.

== Family ==
On 27 February 1795, at the Church of St. Andrew in the Field, England, Gugy married Juliana O'Connor (an English lady with an Irish name), the daughter of James O'Connor, a surgeon in the British Army who served with General James Wolfe at Quebec. Gugy's father-in-law was a tall man possessed of strength and great activity, and remembered to have saved the scalp of a soldier who had fallen in the field during the British retreat near Beauport, Quebec City. With the yells of the rapidly approaching Indians in their ears, O'Connor returned to the soldier and carried him to the safety of the British ships. On another occasion, in Montreal, a woman was seemingly left to her fate in a house fire, she being in an attic window with no ladders available to help her. O'Connor climbed the roof of a neighbouring house, jumped onto a tree and from there on to the burning house, and making his way carefully across to her window, rescued her to a point of safety. Louis and Juliana (O'Connor) Gugy were the parents of six daughters (one of whom died in infancy) and two sons,

- Colonel The Hon. Bartholomew Conrad Augustus Gugy, married Louise-Sophie, daughter of The Hon. Antoine-Louis Juchereau Duchesnay.
- Thomas John Gugy (1798–1825), served with distinction with the Glengarry Light Infantry, died unmarried.
- Anne Amelia Gugy (1799–1825), married Judge Samuel Wentworth Monk (1792–1865) of Montreal, nephew of Sir James Monk, Chief Justice of Lower Canada. They were the grandparents of The Hon. Frederick Debartzch Monk.
- Marie-Elizabeth Gugy (1801–1877), married William Stevenson, merchant of Quebec
- Louisa Bowen Gugy (b. 1804), married James Guthrie Scott (1804–1839), of Quebec. Their son of the same name was President of the Quebec Board of Trade.
- Julia Gugy (b. 1805). In 1825, she married Thomas William Willan of Quebec. They were the grandparents of Sir Robert Caradoc Hamilton, 8th Baronet of Silvertonhill.
- Clara Gugy (1810–1868), died unmarried

Louis Gugy died at Montreal in 1840. He was described as "amiable, generous, hospitable and confiding to a fault". He was highly educated at the French Court, and a refined and accomplished gentleman. Fluent in four languages, like his father and uncle before him, he was also tenacious on the point of honor.

Political offices
| Preceded by Thomas Coffin, Tory; Michel Caron, Parti Canadien | MLA, District of Saint-Maurice; 1809–1810; With: Michel Caron, Parti Canadien | Succeeded by François Caron, Parti Canadien; Michel Caron, Parti Canadien |
| Preceded by Joseph-Rémi Vallières de Saint-Réal, Parti Canadien; Étienne Le Blanc, Parti Canadien | MLA, District of Saint-Maurice; 1816–1819; With: Étienne Mayrand, Tory | Succeeded by Pierre Bureau, Parti Canadien; Étienne Mayrand, Tory |
