= François Caron (politician) =

Canadian politician (1766–1848)

François Caron (September 1766 – November 12, 1848) was a farmer and political figure in Lower Canada. He represented Saint-Maurice in the Legislative Assembly of Lower Canada from 1810 to 1814. He signed his name François Caront.

He was born in Saint-Roch-des-Aulnaies, the son of Michel Caron and Marie-Josephte Parent. He moved to Yamachiche with his parents in 1783. In 1791, he married Catherine Lamy. Caron served as a lieutenant in the militia during the War of 1812, later reaching the rank of major. He was part of a group of singers known as the "Chantres de Machiche". Caron did not run for reelection to the assembly in 1814. He was speaker for the Patriote assembly held at Yamachiche in July 1837. Caron died at Rivière-du-Loup at the age of 82.

His brothers Michel and Charles also served in the assembly. His grandson Édouard Caron served in the Quebec assembly.

Political offices
Preceded by Louis Gugy, Tory; Michel Caron, Parti Canadien	MLA, District of Saint-Maurice; 1810–1814; With: Michel Caron, Parti Canadien	Succeeded by Joseph-Rémi Vallières de Saint-Réal, Parti Canadien; Étienne Le Blanc, Parti Canadien
