= Mathew Bell =

Canadian politician (1769–1849)

Mathew Bell (1769 – June 24, 1849), alternatively spelled Matthew, was a Lower Canada seigneur, businessman and politician.

He was born at Berwick-upon-Tweed in England, the son of James Bell, a merchant of 'gentry stock' who served two terms as the town's Mayor. Bell came to Quebec around 1784 and worked as a clerk for merchant John Lees. In 1790, he started an importing business in partnership with David Monro; they owned a store at Quebec and their own ships. When John Lees retired from business in 1791, they became agents for Alexander and George Davison, who were suppliers to the British troops in North America. Bell and Monro also managed the king's posts on the north shore of the lower Saint Lawrence River and, in 1793, held a share in the lease of the Saint-Maurice ironworks. In 1799, after the death of George Davison, they became sole holders of the lease of the ironworks.

In 1799, Bell was named a justice of the peace. He was elected to the Legislative Assembly of Lower Canada for Saint-Maurice in 1800. He was elected for Trois-Rivières in 1809 and again in 1810, generally supporting the English party. During the War of 1812, he served as a captain in the local militia and formed a volunteer cavalry unit at Quebec. Bell served as master of Trinity House of Quebec from 1814 to 1816. His partner David Monro retired in 1815 and he took on John Stewart as a partner in the firm. In 1817, with Monro, Bell bought the seigneury of Champlain; he acquired the seigneuries of Hertel and Mont-Louis on his own. Bell also acquired large amounts of property in the townships. In 1823, he was named to the Legislative Council and served until the suspension of the constitution following the Lower Canada Rebellion. In 1829, he moved his home to Trois-Rivières to be closer to the ironworks. During the rebellion, he organized the defence against the Patriotes in the region. Bell was invited to serve on the Special Council that governed the province after the rebellion but did not accept the offer.

In 1846, the government sold the Saint-Maurice ironworks; Bell lost to Henry Stuart in the bidding. He retired to Trois-Rivières, where he died in 1849.

He married Anne Mackenzie (1781–1837), daughter of James Mackenzie, merchant of Montreal. Their daughter Catherine married Edward Greive, who represented Trois-Rivières in the legislative assembly of the Province of Canada. His daughter Margaret married William Walker, who served on the legislative council. His daughter Ann married merchant John George Irvine and was the mother of George Irvine, who was a lawyer, judge and served in both the federal and provincial legislatures.

Political offices
Preceded by Nicholas Montour, Tory; Thomas Coffin, Tory	MLA, District of Saint-Maurice; 1800–1804; With: Thomas Coffin, Tory	Succeeded by Michel Caron, Parti Canadien; David Monro, Tory
Preceded by Ezekiel Hart, Tory; Joseph Badeaux, Tory	MLA, District of Trois-Rivières; 1809–1814; With: Joseph Badeaux, Tory; Thomas Coffin, Tory	Succeeded by Charles Richard Ogden, Tory; Amable Berthelot, Parti Canadien
