= Gérin-Lajoie =

Gérin-Lajoie is a French-Canadian surname. Notable people with this name include:

- Antoine Gérin-Lajoie (1824–1882), Canadian (Quebec) poet and novelist
- Charles Gérin-Lajoie (1824–1895), Canadian (Quebec) businessman and political figure
- Marie Lacoste Gérin-Lajoie (1867–1945), Canadian (Quebec) feminist
- Paul Gérin-Lajoie (1920–2018), Canadian (Quebec) lawyer, philanthropist and politician

== See also ==
- Gérin
- Gérin-Lajoie family
- Lajoie (disambiguation)
