= Gérin-Lajoie family =

Family

The Gérin-Lajoie family is a French-Canadian family descended from Jean Gérin dit La joie, a sergeant in the troops of the military forces of Louis-Joseph de Montcalm, in New France, who arrived in Canada around 1750. Several members of the family have been notable members of the legal, social and intellectual communities of Quebec since the 19th century.

== Notable members ==
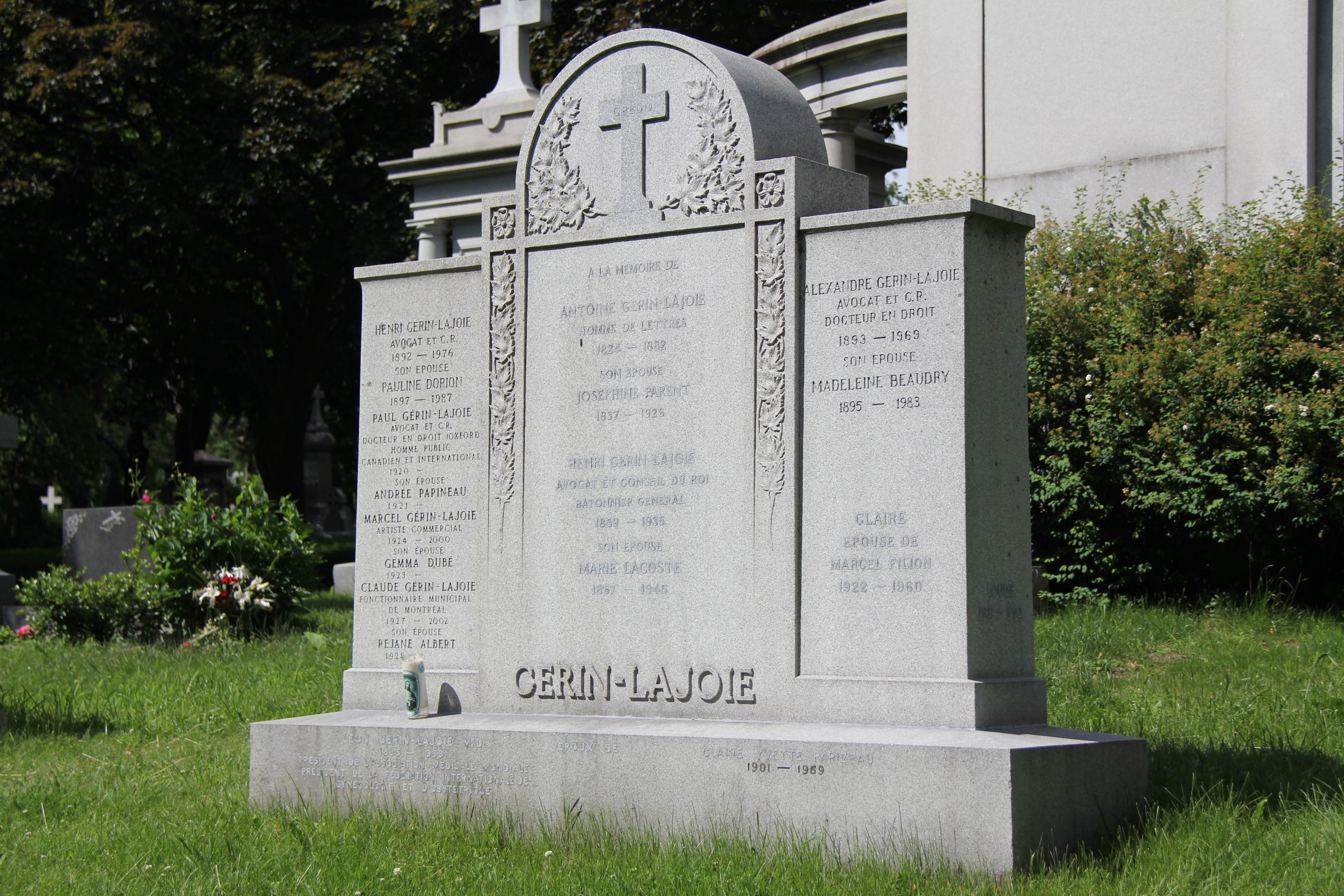
Gérin-Lajoie family tombstone: Alexandre (1893-1969), Antoine (1824-1882), Henri (1859-1936), Léon (1895-1959), Marie (1867-1945, wife of Henri), Notre-Dame-des-Neiges Cemetery (B276 1/2), Montreal.

- Antoine Gérin dit Lajoie, a poet, married to Marie-Amable Gélinas
  - André Gérin, dit la Joie (January 15, 1771, in Yamachiche, – November 22, 1825, in Yamachiche)
    - André Gérin-Lajoie (December 30, 1799, in Yamachiche, – ?), married to Ursule Caron, daughter of Charles Caron.
      - Charles Gérin-Lajoie (December 28, 1824, in Yamachiche, – November 6, 1895, in Trois-Rivières), member of the House of Commons of Canada for Saint-Maurice. He married Élizabeth Dupont on September 19, 1843.
  - Antoine Gérin-Lajoie (August 4, 1824, in Yamachiche, – August 7, 1882, in Ottawa), lawyer and novelist
    - Léon Gérin (May 17, 1863, in Quebec City, – January 15, 1951, in Montreal), Quebec's first sociologist, president of the Royal Society of Canada
  - Elzéar Gérin (November 14, 1843, in Yamachiche, – August 18, 1887, in Montreal), married Marie-Agathe-Élodie Dufresne on October 14, 1873.
  - Denis Gérin
  - Henri Gérin-Lajoie (October 18, 1859, in Quebec City – May 7, 1936), lawyer and bâtonnier of Quebec. He married the pioneering feminist Marie Lacoste (known as Marie Lacoste Gérin-Lajoie), the daughter of Alexandre Lacoste, in 1887
    - Marie Gérin-Lajoie (June 9, 1890, in Montreal, – January 7, 1971, in Montreal), social worker and founder of a religious community
    - Henri Gérin-Lajoie II (February 4, 1892 – August 1, 1976)
      - Paul Gérin-Lajoie (February 23, 1920, in Montreal, – June 25, 2018, in Montreal), politician and creator of the Gérin-Lajoie doctrine.

== See also ==
- Gérin-Lajoie
