= Joseph-Rémi Vallières de Saint-Réal =

Canadian politician

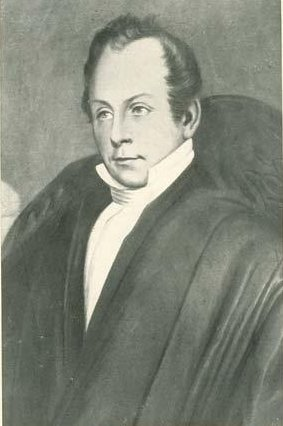
Joseph-Rémi Vallières de Saint-Réal

Joseph-Rémi Vallières de Saint-Réal (October 1, 1787 – February 17, 1847) was a lawyer, judge and political figure in Lower Canada.

He was born Joseph-Rémi Vallière at Carleton, Quebec, on the Bay of Chaleur, in 1787, the son of blacksmith Jean-Baptiste Valliere and his wife Marguerite Cornelier (dit Grandchamp). On April 23, 1799, Joseph-Rémi, his mother, father and siblings were all hired at Quebec City as workers by John Blackwood, agent for Joseph-Genevieve de Puisaye (the Comte de Puisaye). They were to join a party of French Royalists, refugees from the French Revolution, at Kingston, Upper Canada. This group, under de Puisaye's leadership, was on its way to York County to establish a settlement on Yonge Street, north of Elgin Mills and south of Bond Lake, on land that is now part of the city of Richmond Hill, Ontario. Jean-Baptiste and family had been hired to assist with the building of this new settlement "according to their respective strengths, skill, and talents." It was to be named Windham. The family came to the area in June, 1799, along with other workers. Within a year or so, the Windham settlement ran into difficulties, eventually failing altogether. By August, 1800, the Valliere family had resettled in York (Toronto). That October Rémi's father died suddenly leaving his mother, Marguerite, a widow with nine children. Two or three years later Marguerite met, then married, Asher Mundy, a Quaker, originally from New Jersey. Around the time of his mother's remarriage, Remi (age 15) was sent to Quebec City, where he lived with his Aunt Charlotte, his mother's sister, wife of Basile Amiot, in the Lower Town of the city (Basse-Ville de Quebec).

Once in Quebec City, he was tutored by Monsignor Joseph-Octave Plessis, and then studied at the Petit Séminaire de Québec. He studied law with Charles Thomas and then with Edward Bowen and qualified to practice in 1812. He served as a lieutenant in the militia during the War of 1812. He married Louise, the daughter of seigneur Pierre-Melchior Pezard de Champlain in 1812. He acquired property at Quebec, was the main shareholder in a toll bridge over the Etchemin River, was a part-owner in a lumber business and owned a gristmill that he rented out in exchange for a large portion of its flour production. He was elected to the Legislative Assembly of Lower Canada for Saint-Maurice in 1814, then represented the Upper Town of Quebec from 1820 to 1829. Vallières de Saint-Réal was a moderate member of the parti canadien. He opposed the union of Upper and Lower Canada proposed in 1822 and served as speaker from 1823 to 1825 during the absence of Louis-Joseph Papineau, who went to London to present the case against the union. He helped found the Literary and Historical Society of Quebec in 1824 and served as a vice-president.

In 1829, he was named provincial judge at Trois-Rivières after the death of Pierre-Stanislas Bédard. He was named resident judge in the Court of King's Bench for Trois-Rivières district in 1830. In 1836, he married Jane Keirnan, a widow, there; his first wife had died in 1829. Vallières de Saint-Réal was named to the Executive Council in 1838. He was suspended as a judge later that year because he issued a writ of habeas corpus shortly after habeas corpus had been suspended by colonial administrator Sir John Colborne. He signed a petition against the Union of Upper and Lower Canada in 1840. He was reinstated as a judge in August of that year and compensated for his loss of income during the suspension. In 1842, he was named chief justice in the Court of King's Bench for Montreal district.

He died at Montreal in 1847.

Political offices
Preceded by François Caron, Parti Canadien; Michel Caron, Parti Canadien	MLA, District of Saint-Maurice; 1814–1816; With: Étienne Le Blanc, Parti Canadien	Succeeded by Louis Gugy, Tory; Étienne Mayrand, Tory
