= David Monro (merchant) =

Canadian politician

David Monro (ca. 1765 – September 3, 1834) was a seigneur, businessman and political figure in Lower Canada. His surname was also sometimes spelled Munro.

== Life ==
He was born around 1765 in Scotland. The date of his arrival at Quebec is not known but, in 1791, he was involved in administering the dissolving of a partnership between Alexander Davison and John Lees. Monro later became partners with Mathew Bell and, with George Davison, they purchased the Saint-Maurice ironworks in 1793. George Davison died in 1799, which left Monro and Bell the sole owners of the ironworks at Saint-Maurice. In 1804, he was elected to the Legislative Assembly of Lower Canada for Saint-Maurice and generally supported the English party.

In 1807, Munro married Catherine MacKenzie, who was the sister of Mathew Bell's wife. He helped found the Quebec Committee of Trade in 1809. He also served in the local militia, becoming major in 1813. Monro served as justice of the peace for Trois-Rivières and Quebec districts. He was a member of the management committee of the Union Company of Quebec, which operated the Union Hotel at Quebec. Monro retired from the business in 1816, selling his share to Bell. In 1817, he bought the seigneury of Champlain with Bell. He was offered a seat on the Legislative Council in that same year but declined as he was planning to leave the province.

Monro died at Bath in England in 1834.

== Family ==
Monro's daughter Margaret married Thomas Levett, of Wychnor Park, Staffordshire, in 1831, three years before Monro's death. (Levett later hyphenated his last name to Levett-Prinsep, and inherited Croxall Hall, Derbyshire, a holding of his uncle Thomas Prinsep's family.) That same year Monro's daughter Helen married Sir Edmund Filmer, 8th Baronet.

Political offices
Preceded by Thomas Coffin, Tory; Mathew Bell, Tory	MLA, District of Saint-Maurice; 1804–1808; With: Michel Caron, Parti Canadien	Succeeded by Thomas Coffin, Tory; Michel Caron, Parti Canadien
