= Thomas Coffin (Lower Canada politician) =

Canadian politician (1762–1841)

Thomas Coffin (July 5, 1762 – July 18, 1841) was a businessman, seigneur and political figure in Lower Canada.

He was born in Boston in 1762, the son of John Coffin, and came to the town of Quebec with his family in 1775. He became a merchant in Montreal. In 1786, he married Marguerite, the daughter of Louis-Joseph Godefroy de Tonnancour, and settled at the seigneury of Pointe-du-Lac. Coffin served as the sheriff for Trois-Rivières district from 1790 to 1791. He was elected to the Legislative Assembly of Lower Canada for Saint-Maurice in 1792; he was reelected in 1796, 1800 and 1808. He was named a justice of the peace in 1794. In 1795, a large portion of his properties were sold to cover an unpaid debt. In 1798, with John Craigie, he established an ironworks at Batiscan. Coffin was elected to the legislative assembly for Trois-Rivières in 1810. In 1817, he was named to the Legislative Council and served until 1838. Coffin also served as colonel for the local militia and commissioner of police for Trois-Rivières.

He died in Trois-Rivières in 1841.

His brother Nathaniel was a provincial surveyor and also served in the legislative assembly.

Political offices
Preceded by Parliamentary system established in 1792	MLA, District of Saint-Maurice; 1792–1804; With: Augustin Rivard-Dufresne, Parti Canadien; Nicholas Montour, Tory; Mathew Bell, Tory	Succeeded by David Monro, Tory; Michel Caron, Parti Canadien
Preceded by David Monro, Tory; Michel Caron, Parti Canadien	MLA, District of Saint-Maurice; 1808–1809; With: Michel Caron, Parti Canadien	Succeeded by Louis Gugy, Tory; Michel Caron, Parti Canadien
Preceded by Joseph Badeaux, Tory; Mathew Bell, Tory	MLA, District of Trois-Rivières; 1810–1814; With: Mathew Bell, Tory	Succeeded by Amable Berthelot, Parti Canadien; Charles Richard Ogden, Tory
