= Gérin =

Gérin is a French surname. Notable people with this name include:

- Gérin, one of the paladins of Charlemagne's court
- André Gerin (born 1946), French politician
- Elzéar Gérin (1843–1887), Canadian politician
- François Gérin (1944–2005), Canadian politician and lawyer
- Henri Gérin (1900–1941), Canadian politician
- John T. Gerin, American physician at Auburn State Prison in Auburn, New York
- Léon Gérin (1863–1951), Canadian lawyer, civil servant, and sociologist
- Léon-Denis Gérin (1894–1975), Canadian politician
- Maksim Gerin (born 1984), Russian footballer
- Winifred Gérin (1901–1981), English biographer

== Aircraft ==
- Gérin 1936 Varivol biplane

== See also ==
- Gérin-Lajoie
- Gérin-Lajoie family
