= Étienne Le Blanc =

Canadian politician

Étienne Le Blanc (1759 – July 11, 1831) was a merchant, seigneur and political figure in Lower Canada. He represented Saint-Maurice in the Legislative Assembly of Lower Canada from 1814 to 1816.

He was born in Champlain, Quebec, the son of Jean-Jacques Le Blanc and Marie Héon, Acadian exiles. In 1796, he married Josette Richerville. In 1801, he moved to Trois-Rivières. Le Blanc was a justice of the peace and a commissioner for the relief of the insane and foundlings. He acquired much property, including the seigneury of Dutort and part of the seigneury of Champlain, as well as land in Godefroy and Roquetaillade seigneuries and in Trois-Rivières. Le Blanc died in Trois-Rivières.

His son Ovide Le Blanc was a member of the Legislative Assembly of the Province of Canada.

Political offices
| Preceded by François Caron, Parti Canadien; Michel Caron, Parti Canadien | MLA, District of Saint-Maurice; 1814–1816; With: Joseph-Rémi Vallières de Saint-Réal, Parti Canadien | Succeeded by Louis Gugy, Tory; Étienne Mayrand, Tory |
