= Gugy =

Gugy is a surname. Notable people with the surname include:

- Bartholomew Gugy (1796–1876), Canadian politician
- Conrad Gugy (1734–1786), Dutch-Canadian politician
- Louis Gugy (1770–1840), Canadian politician
