= Alexis Rivard =

Canadian politician

Alexis Rivard (November 21, 1784 – July 8, 1854) was a trader and political figure in Lower Canada. He represented Rimouski in the Legislative Assembly of Lower Canada from 1832 to 1834.

He was born Alexis-Alexandre Rivard in Rivière-du-Loup-en-Haut, the son of François Rivard, dit Laglanderie and Marie-Ursule Ledroit. He was a trader at Yamachiche and then seigneurial agent for Mitis. He was elected to the legislative assembly in an 1832 by-election held after the elections of 1830 in Rimouski were declared invalid. Rivard generally supported the Parti patriote and voted in support of the Ninety-Two Resolutions. Rivard was married twice: to Marie Guillet in 1811 and to Catherine Drapeau in 1831. He died at Rimouski at the age of 69.

Two brothers of his first wife, Valère and Louis, were also members of the legislative assembly.
