= Thaïs Lacoste-Frémont =

Canadian women's rights activist (1886–1963)

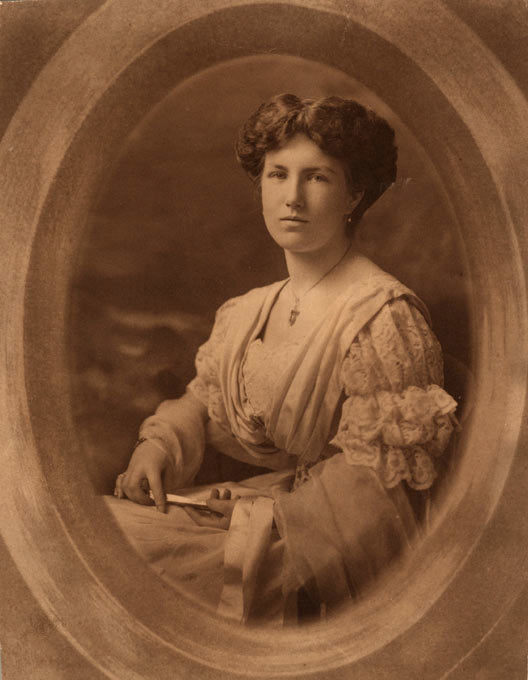
- Lacoste-Frémont in 1904
- Born: October 18, 1886; Montreal, Quebec
- Died: May 6, 1963 (aged 76); Montreal, Quebec
- Spouse: Charles Frémont (m. 1910)
- Parents: Alexandre Lacoste (father); Marie-Louise Globensky (mother)
- Relatives: Marie-Joséphine Gérin-Lajoie (niece); Justine Lacoste-Beaubien (sister); Marie Lacoste Gérin-Lajoie (sister); Louis Lacoste (paternal grandfather)

Thaïs Lacoste-Frémont (October 18, 1886 – May 6, 1963) was an advocate for women's rights in Quebec.

== Early life ==
Lacoste-Frémont came from an eminent family. Her father, Sir Alexandre Lacoste, became a Senator and her mother Marie-Louise Globensky, was a noted philanthropist. Among her seven sisters were the noted feminist Marie Lacoste Gérin-Lajoie, the humanitarian Justine Lacoste-Beaubien and the businesswoman Berthe Dansereau. She married Charles Frémont, a lawyer, in 1910.

== Public life ==
Lacoste-Frémont was active in the Conservative Party. She founded and served as the first president of the Quebec Conservative Women's Association (French: Association des femmes conservatrices du Quebec). She was a delegate to the 1927 Conservative leadership convention in Winnipeg, where the Conservatives selected R. B. Bennett—who became Prime Minister in 1930—as their leader.

In the late 1920s, Lacoste-Frémont co-chaired the Montreal Association of Women Property-Owners (French: Association des femmes propriétaires de Montréal). Along with several other organizations, the Association was instrumental in convening the Dorion Commission in 1929–30. Chaired by judge Charles-Édouard Dorion, the commission was tasked with examination and reform of the Civil Code of Quebec as it pertained to the rights of women. At the time, the law of Quebec was notably regressive as compared to that of other provinces, and a major goal of women's rights activists in Quebec was to liberalize the legal regime. The Commission ultimately made rather modest proposals for reform, of which few were adopted. One reform that was taken up, however, gave married women legal ownership of salaries they earned.

In 1932, she was appointed by the Bennett government to serve as a Canadian delegate to the 13th conference of the League of Nations. Indeed, Prime Minister R. B. Bennett hoped to name her a Senator in the early 1930s; if he had done so, she would have been the first French Canadian woman to serve as a Senator. Cardinal Jean-Marie-Rodrigue Villeneuve, however, reportedly asked her to decline—saying that the Senate was "no place for a woman"—and she acquiesced to the cardinal's request.

In 1933, she was a representative to the fifth biennial conference of the Institute of Pacific Relations, held in Banff.

Her 1947 lecture series "The rights of the married woman in the civil and political life of the province of Québec" (French: Les droits de la femme mariée dans la vie civile et politique de la province de Québec) was highly influential. Some of Lacoste-Frémont's proposals in "Les droits" informed Marie-Claire Kirkland's Bill 16, which, in 1964, made substantial changes to Civil Code provisions regarding women's rights.

== Bibliography ==
- Gérin-Lajoie, Paul (1989). Combats d'un révolutionnaire tranquille : propos et confidences (in French). Montréal: CEC. ISBN 9782761707022. OCLC 1148617488 – via Internet Archive.
- Pelletier-Baillargeon, Hélène (1985). Marie Gérin-Lajoie (in French). Montreal: Boréal Express. ISBN 2890521451. OCLC 964223953 – via Internet Archive.
