= Lajoie =

Lajoie may refer to:

== People ==
- Aimee La Joie, American actress
- Andrée Lajoie (born 1933), Canadian jurist and academic
- Bill Lajoie (1934–2010), American baseball player and general manager
- Claude Lajoie (1928–2015), Canadian Liberal Party member
- Corey LaJoie (born 1991), American race car driver, son of Randy LaJoie
- Jon Lajoie (born 1980), Canadian comedian, actor, and internet celebrity
- Marjorie Lajoie (born 2000), Canadian ice dancer
- Maxime Lajoie (born 1997), Canadian professional ice hockey player
- Michel Lajoie (fl. 2014), American politician
- Nap Lajoie (1874–1959), American baseball player
- Randy LaJoie (born 1961), American race car driver, father of Corey LaJoie

== Places ==
- Lajoie Dam, a storage dam in British Columbia, Canada
- Lajoie Lake, usually known as Little Gun Lake, a small lake in British Columbia, Canada

== See also ==
- Alexandre Bareil, dit Lajoie (1822–1862), Canadian farmer and political figure
- Frédéric Lajoie-Gravelle (born 1993), Canadian soccer player
- Gérin-Lajoie, a list of people with the surname
- Gérin-Lajoie family
