= Louis-Léon Lesieur Désaulniers =

Canadian politician (1823–1896)

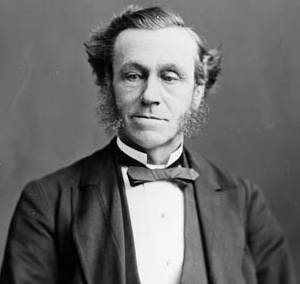

Member of the Legislative Assembly of the Province of Canada for Saint-Maurice
- In office 1854–1863
- Preceded by: Joseph-Édouard Turcotte
- Succeeded by: Charles Gérin-Lajoie

Member of the Canadian Parliament for Saint-Maurice
- In office 1867–1868
- Preceded by: District established in 1867
- Succeeded by: Élie Lacerte
- In office 1878–1887
- Preceded by: Charles Gérin-Lajoie
- Succeeded by: François-Sévère Lesieur Desaulniers

Personal details
- Born: February 20, 1823 Yamachiche, Lower Canada
- Died: October 31, 1896 (aged 73) Montreal, Quebec
- Party: Conservative

Louis-Léon Lesieur Désaulniers (February 20, 1823 – October 31, 1896) was a Quebec physician and political figure. He represented Saint-Maurice in the House of Commons of Canada as a Conservative member from 1867 to 1868 and from 1879 to 1887.

He was born in Yamachiche, Lower Canada in 1823, the son of François Lesieur Desaulniers, who represented Saint-Maurice in the legislative assemblies for Lower Canada and the Province of Canada. He studied at the Séminaire de Nicolet, then went on to study medicine, first at Trois-Rivières and then at Harvard University, graduating in 1846. He returned to practice in Yamachiche. He was elected to represent Saint-Maurice in the Legislative Assembly of Canada in 1854, 1858 and 1861 as a member of the parti bleu, then was defeated in 1863. He was elected to the 1st Canadian Parliament in 1867 but resigned in 1868 to become inspector for prisons and asylums in Quebec, later serving as president of that agency. Desaulniers also was an officer in the local militia. He died in Montreal in 1896.

His son Eugène Merrill was later a member of the Legislative Assembly of Quebec.

== Electoral record ==
=== Saint Maurice, 1867–1886 ===
1867 Canadian federal election: Saint-Maurice
Party	Candidate	Votes
Conservative	Louis-Léon Lesieur Désaulniers	acclaimed
Source: Canadian Elections Database

1878 Canadian federal election: Saint-Maurice
Party	Candidate	Votes	%
Conservative	Louis-Léon Lesieur Désaulniers	811	52.59
Unknown	S.J. Remington	731	47.41

1882 Canadian federal election: Saint-Maurice
Party	Candidate	Votes	%
Conservative	Louis-Léon Lesieur Désaulniers	842	65.37
Unknown	Pierre Lamy	446	34.63

1887 Canadian federal election: Saint-Maurice
Party	Candidate	Votes	%
Conservative	François-Sévère Lesieur Désaulniers	918	58.51
Liberal	L.A. Lord	651	41.49

1891 Canadian federal election: Saint-Maurice
Party	Candidate	Votes	%
Conservative	François-Sévère Lesieur Désaulniers	894	54.41
Independent Conservative	Louis-Léon Lesieur Désaulniers	749	45.59
