= François-Sévère Lesieur Désaulniers =

Canadian politician (1850–1913)

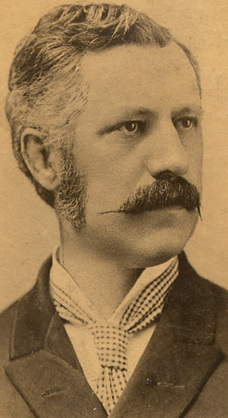

Member of the Canadian Parliament for Saint-Maurice
- In office 1887–1896
- Preceded by: Louis-Léon Lesieur Desaulniers
- Succeeded by: District was abolished in 1892

Member of the Legislative Assembly of Quebec for Saint-Maurice
- In office 1878–1886
- Preceded by: Élie Lacerte
- Succeeded by: Nérée Le Noblet Duplessis

Personal details
- Born: September 19, 1850 Yamachiche, Canada East
- Died: January 29, 1913 (aged 62) Montreal, Quebec
- Party: Conservative

François-Sévère Lesieur Désaulniers (September 19, 1850 – January 29, 1913) was a politician in the province of Quebec, Canada. He served as Member of the Legislative Assembly.

== Early life ==
He was born on September 19, 1850, in Yamachiche, Mauricie. He was ordained in 1872, but left the priesthood three years later and became an attorney.

== Provincial politics ==
Désaulniers was elected as a Conservative candidate to the Legislative Assembly of Quebec in 1878, representing the district of Saint-Maurice. He was re-elected in 1881, but did not run for re-election in 1886. He was succeeded by law practice partner Nérée Le Noblet Duplessis and moved to federal politics.

== Federal politics ==
He was elected as a Conservative candidate to the House of Commons of Canada in 1887, representing the district of Saint-Maurice. He was re-elected in 1891, but did not run for re-election in 1896.

== Death ==
He died in Montreal on January 29, 1913.
