= Nérée Beauchemin =

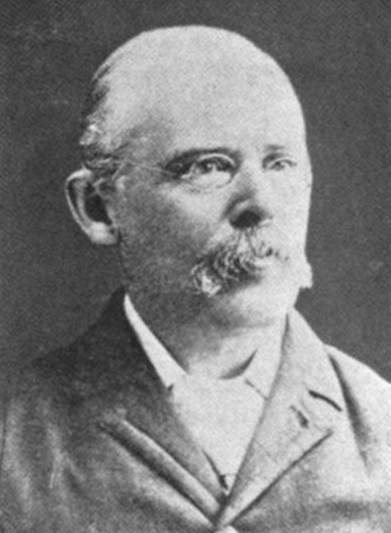
- Born: Charles-Nérée Beauchemin; February 20, 1850; Yamachiche, Canada East
- Died: June 29, 1931 (aged 81); Trois-Rivières, Quebec
- Citizenship: Canadian
- Writing career
- Language: French
- Genre: Poetry
- Subjects: Quebec, nature
- Literary movement: Le Terroir school

Charles-Nérée Beauchemin (February 20, 1850 – June 29, 1931) was a French Canadian regionalist poet and physician from Yamachiche, near Trois-Rivières, Quebec. He was part of Quebec's Le Terroir ("The Soil") school of poetry.

Beauchemin published two volumes of his poetry: Les Floraisons Matutinales (The Morning Blossoming) in 1897 and Patrie intime: Harmonies (Intimate Homeland: Harmonies) in 1928.

His poetry celebrates life in his small rural community with themes of Catholic ritual, the cycles of nature, and love of family and home. Beauchemin was inspired by the religion and culture of Quebec and an appreciation for the Canadian landscape. While acclaimed in its time, Beauchemin's poetry is generally considered conventional and sentimental by contemporary standards.
