= Élie Lacerte =

Canadian politician (1821–1898)

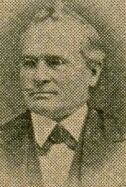

Member of the Canadian Parliament for Saint-Maurice
- In office 1868–1874
- Preceded by: Louis-Léon Lesieur Desaulniers
- Succeeded by: Charles Gérin-Lajoie

Member of the Legislative Assembly of Quebec for Saint-Maurice
- In office 1875–1878
- Preceded by: Elzéar Gérin
- Succeeded by: François-Sévère Lesieur Desaulniers

Personal details
- Born: November 21, 1821 Yamachiche, Lower Canada
- Died: April 24, 1898 (aged 76) Yamachiche, Quebec
- Party: Conservative

Élie Lacerte (November 21, 1821 – April 24, 1898) was a physician and political figure in Quebec, Canada. He represented Saint Maurice in the House of Commons of Canada as a Conservative member from 1868 to 1874 and in the Legislative Assembly of Quebec from 1875 to 1878.

He was born in Saint-Sévère in 1821. He studied at the college at Nicolet and at Harvard University. In 1847, he was licensed to practice medicine and entered practice at Yamachiche. Lacerte was also postmaster there. He was elected to the House of Commons in an 1868 by-election after Louis Léon Lesieur Desaulniers resigned his seat. He was defeated in Saint Maurice during the federal general election of 1874, then elected to the provincial assembly in 1875 in the electoral district of the same name. He served as land agent for Saint Maurice from 1887 to 1898.

He died in Yamachiche in 1898.

== Electoral record ==
Canadian federal by-election, 30 October 1868 On Mr. Désaulniers' resignation, 29 September 1868
| Party | Candidate | Votes | % |
|---|---|---|---|
| Conservative | Élie Lacerte | 679 | 61.84 |
| Unknown | E. Gérin | 419 | 38.16 |

1872 Canadian federal election: Saint-Maurice
| Party | Candidate | Votes |
|---|---|---|
| Conservative | Élie Lacerte | acclaimed |
Source: Canadian Elections Database

1874 Canadian federal election: Saint-Maurice
| Party | Candidate | Votes | % |
|---|---|---|---|
| Liberal | Charles Gérin-Lajoie | 575 | 52.46 |
| Conservative | Élie Lacerte | 521 | 47.54 |
Source: lop.parl.ca
