= Marie-Louise Lacoste =

Canadian philanthropist and diarist (1849–1919)

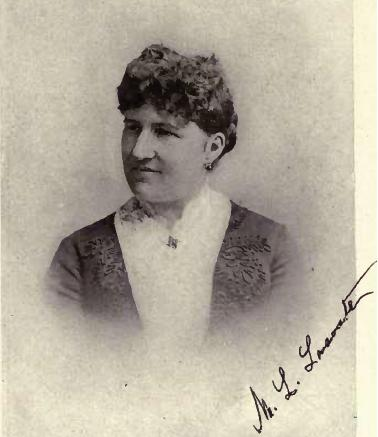
- Lady Lacoste, 1903
- Born: Marie-Louise Sophie-Elmina Globensky; 2 February 1849; Montreal, Canada East
- Died: 11 December 1919 (aged 70); Montreal, Quebec, Canada
- Other names: Lady Lacoste, Marie Lacoste, Marie Globensky Lacoste
- Occupation: philanthropist
- Spouse: Alexandre Lacoste (m. 1866)
- Children: 13; including Marie, Justine, Thaïs, Berthe
- Relatives: August Franz Globensky (grandfather)

Marie-Louise Globensky, Lady Lacoste (2 February 1849 – 11 December 1919), was a French-speaking Canadian philanthropist and diarist from the province of Quebec. She served as patroness for schools, orphans' homes, and several hospitals, including Sainte Justine (founded by her daughter Justine Lacoste-Beaubien), Hôpital Notre-Dame, and the Youville Foundling Hospital. Globensky was president of many benevolent societies, such as Château Ramezay and the Asile de la Providence. Appointed by her daughter Marie Lacoste Gérin-Lajoie, she served as vice-president of the Montreal Council of Women and supported women's suffrage, as long as social order was maintained. She also joined the National Federation of Saint John the Baptist, served on its board, and helped develop programs designed to help working women. A prolific diarist, her journals have contributed to the knowledge of how 19th-century middle-class women dealt with the social structures of their times.

== Early life ==
Marie-Louise Sophie-Elmina Globensky, as she was christened on 3 February 1849 at Notre-Dame Basilica of Montreal, was born on 2 February 1849 to Marguerite Angélique (née Limoges) and Sir Léon Globensky. Of Polish heritage, her father was a prominent merchant who later became a customs officer. Her grandfather, August Franz Globensky was a Polish-German physician who had been hired by the British Army as a mercenary to suppress colonial rebels during the American Revolutionary War. As a child, together with her friend Eliza Chauveau, daughter of Pierre-Joseph-Olivier Chauveau, she enjoyed embroidering, studying, snowshoeing, playing games, and praying. Her juvenile diary indicates that like other children she participated in music lessons and social engagements and documents her regular attendance at church.

On 8 May 1866, at Notre-Dame Basilica, Globensky married Alexandre Lacoste, whom she had met at an engagement three months earlier. At the time of their marriage, Alexandre had graduated from Laval University and was practicing law. He became a Queen's Counsel in 1880 and later served as speaker of the Senate, Chief Justice of Quebec, and as professor of law at his alma mater. In 1889, he was knighted and his wife was then officially known as Lady Lacoste. In 1892, he was raised to Knight Bachelor. The couple had 13 children: Marie (1867–1945), Louis Joseph (1869–1909), Marie Josephine Angelique Henriette (1870–1871), Blanche (1872–1957), Paul (1875–1945), Justine (1877–1967), Jeanne (1879–1962), Yvonne (1881–1947), Alexandre (1883–1940), Joseph Eugene Arthur (1885–1888), Thaïs (1886–1963), Berthe (1889–1966), and Henri Rene (1891–1892).

Lacoste lost four of her children in their infancy and wrote of her grief in her private journals. These periods of mourning were motivating factors for her daughters' dedication to improving the lives of women and children. Her diaries have given historians a rare look into how emotions impacted the lives of women in her social class. Both Alexandre and Lady Lacoste were from conservative and ultramontanist backgrounds, but both admired and supported the British Crown. They raised their children in a hybrid environment, respecting British customs, while maintaining strong ties to their French language and culture. As was typical for women at the time, her life was divided between family responsibility, social obligations, charitable works, and obligations to the church. While she raised her children with strict Victorian morals, refusing to allow them to ride bicycles and requiring them to attend church, Lacoste indulged their theatrical interest, encouraging them to participate in dramatic productions.

== Charitable works ==
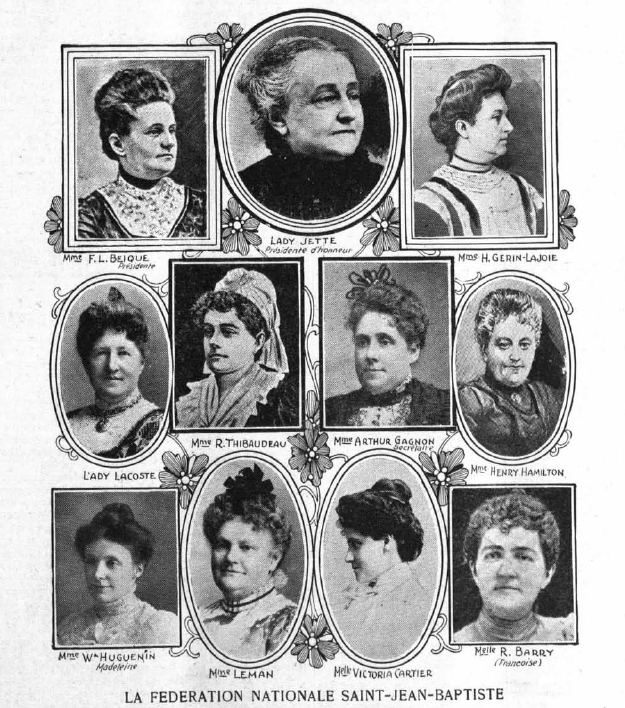
Lady Lacoste, 2nd row first photograph on the left as one of the Board of Directors of the National Federation of Saint-Jean-Baptiste of Montreal in 1907.

Lacoste was involved in benevolent events, often serving as patroness for balls used to raise funds for charitable works. She spent her days caring for the poor, the infirm, and for orphans, providing them with food, clothing and shelter. In an effort to combat the hostility of the clergy to the radical ideas of women's suffrage, Marie Lacoste Gérin-Lajoie, appointed her mother, who was well known for her philanthropy, to serve as vice-president of the Montreal Local Council of Women when it was formed in 1893. Lady Lacoste supported women's suffrage, as long as it did not upset the social order, but unlike her daughter Gérin-Lajoie, Lacoste was not a radical, in fighting for women's rights. She supported several schools and served on the board of the Ladies Antiquarian Society in various capacities, including as president in 1907.

From 1905 to 1906 Lacoste was president of Château Ramezay and served as president of other benevolent societies including the Asile de la Providence and as Lady Patronesses of the Hôpital Notre-Dame. In 1907, she was convinced by Gérin-Lajoie to become active in the National Federation of Saint John the Baptist. Along with Caroline Dessaulles-Béique, she served on the organizational board and helped develop programs in mutual aid societies to help domestic workers train in household management. Also in 1907, she became a patron and co-founder of the Sainte Justine Hospital, the first children's hospital in Quebec, which had been organized by her daughter Justine Lacoste-Beaubien.

The Lacostes celebrated their golden anniversary in 1916 and were feted in a large gathering of family and friends. She organized fund-raising for the Youville Foundling Hospital. During World War I, Lacoste was engaged with the French Canadian Committee of Montreal, which raised funds to assist prisoners of war. She remained active in patriotic and philanthropic endeavors until her death, noting in her diary the night before she died that she had been able to secure housing for four orphans.

== Death and legacy ==
Lacoste died suddenly on 11 December 1919 at her home. Her funeral, attended largely by society figures and dignitaries, took place at Saint-Jacques Cathedral on 15 December, after which she was interred at the Notre Dame des Neiges Cemetery. At the time of her death, she was remembered for her charitable endeavors, but she has recently become remembered above all for her writing. Lacoste was a prolific diarist who began writing at around 15, and then suspended activity until she was 39. She wrote 25 journals prior to her death at age 70. Few women's diaries are known from this period in Quebec, and Lacoste's have been used to help develop the historiography of emotions of 19th-century Québécoise women. Her diaries are housed at the Bibliothèque et Archives nationales du Québec. Sophie Doucet has published various articles, including a PhD thesis, evaluating how joy, sadness, and love were demonstrated by Lacoste a devout French-Canadian Catholic, in her writings. Novelist Sylvie Gobeil also wrote a historical novel, Lady Lacoste, to bring the story of Lacoste's life out of obscurity.

Despite Lacoste's rigid and puritanical characteristics, she did not impose these on her children. Her daughters credited her for being open and encouraging them to be empowered and engaged in society. Her daughter Marie married Henri Gérin-Lajoie and became a pioneering feminist and suffragist in Canada. Her son Louis, worked in the Quebec Court of Appeal and invented a ship brake that was used on vessels by both the Canadian and US governments. Paul became a lawyer, served as King's Counsel and batonnier-general of the Bar of Quebec. Justine married Louis de Gaspé Beaubien and was the principal founder of Sainte Justine Hospital, Montreal's first French-Canadian hospital for children. Justine served on the boards of numerous hospital associations and advisory councils. Alexandre, like his brother Paul, was an attorney and served as King's Counsel. Thaïs married the lawyer Charles Frémont and was a prominent journalist, speaker, and women's rights activist. She served as the inaugural president of the Association of Conservative Women of Quebec and in 1932 became the first female delegate sent by Prime Minister R. B. Bennett to represent Canada at the League of Nations. Berthe married Jean Hayward Dansereau and owned and operated a successful catering business in Montreal, refusing to become idle after her husband's early death.

== Selected works ==
- Lacoste, Marie-Louise, Lady (1994). Le journal intime, 1864–1866, de Lady Lacoste, née Marie-Louise Globensky, 1849–1919 (in French). Montréal, Quebec: Éditions de la Coste. ISBN 978-2-9804439-0-9.
