= Justine Lacoste-Beaubien =

Canadian children's hospital founder (1877-1967)

Justine Lacoste-Beaubien OBE
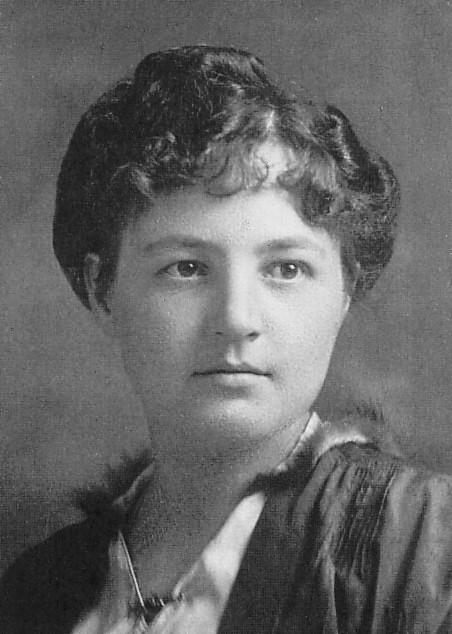
- Justine Lacoste-Beaubien (1903)
- Born: October 1, 1877; Montreal, Quebec
- Died: January 17, 1967 (aged 89)
- Known for: Opening the Saint-Justine hospital
- Spouse: Louis de Gaspé-Beaubien (m. 1899)
- Parents: Alexandre Lacoste (father); Marie-Louise Globensky (mother)
- Relatives: Marie Lacoste Gérin-Lajoie (sister); Thaïs Lacoste-Frémont (sister); Marie-Joséphine Gérin-Lajoie (niece); Louis Lacoste (paternal grandfather)

Justine Lacoste-Beaubien (October 1, 1877 – January 17, 1967) was one of the founders of the children's hospital Sainte-Justine Hospital.

Born in Montreal, the daughter of Alexandre Lacoste and Marie-Louise Globensky, she married Louis de Gaspé-Beaubien, son of Hon. Louis Beaubien, in 1899. Her maternal great-grandfather was born in Berlin to a family of Polish origin.

In 1934 Lacoste-Beaubien was made an Officer of the Order of the British Empire "for services for sick and crippled children; in founding and extending the St. Justine Hospital".
