= Charles Gérin-Lajoie =

Canadian politician (1824–1895)

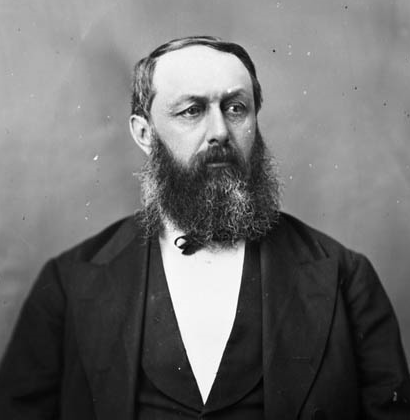

Member of the Canadian Parliament for Saint-Maurice
- In office 1874–1878
- Preceded by: Élie Lacerte
- Succeeded by: Louis-Léon Lesieur Desaulniers

Member of the Legislative Assembly of the Province of Canada for Saint-Maurice
- In office 1863–1866
- Preceded by: Louis-Léon Lesieur Desaulniers
- Succeeded by: Institution abolished in 1866

Personal details
- Born: 28 December 1824 Yamachiche, Lower Canada
- Died: 6 November 1895 (aged 70) Trois-Rivières, Quebec, Canada
- Party: Liberal

Charles Gérin-Lajoie (28 December 1824 – 6 November 1895) was a Quebec businessman and political figure. He represented Saint-Maurice in the House of Commons of Canada as a Liberal member from 1874 to 1878.

== Biography ==
He was born André-Charles Gérin-Lajoie at Yamachiche, Lower Canada on 28 December 1824, to André Gérin and Ursule Caron, daughter of Charles Caron.

He studied at the Séminaire de Nicolet. He owned mills and a factory at Yamachiche. In 1863, Gérin-Lajoie was elected to the Legislative Assembly of the Province of Canada for Saint-Maurice as a member of the Parti rouge. He opposed Confederation, but was elected to the federal parliament in 1874 running as a Liberal. In 1878, he was named superintendent of Public Works for Saint-Maurice and he served in that function until his death at Trois-Rivières on 6 November 1895.
