= Saint Maurice (Province of Canada electoral district) =

Electoral district in former Province of Canada

Coordinates: 47°33′6.6″N 73°25′7.9″W

Saint-Maurice Canada East
Province of Canada electoral district

Defunct pre-Confederation electoral district
- Legislature: Legislative Assembly of the Province of Canada
- District created: 1841
- District abolished: 1867
- First contested: 1841
- Last contested: 1863

Saint Maurice was an electoral district of the Legislative Assembly of the Parliament of the Province of Canada, in Canada East, on the north shore of the Saint Lawrence River, between Montreal and Quebec City. It was created for the first Parliament in 1841, and was based on the previous electoral district of the same name for the Legislative Assembly of Lower Canada. It was represented by one member in the Legislative Assembly.

The electoral district lost some territory in the redistribution of 1853, when the district of Maskinongé was created, in part out of Saint Maurice. The district was abolished in 1867 upon the creation of Canada and the province of Quebec.

== Boundaries ==
The electoral district of Saint Maurice roughly covered the current Mauricie region of Quebec, except for the city of Trois-Rivières. The original boundaries were partially reduced in the 1853 redistribution, which created the new electoral district of Maskinongé from part of the Saint Maurice district.

The Union Act, 1840 had merged the two provinces of Upper Canada and Lower Canada into the Province of Canada, with a single Parliament. The separate parliaments of Lower Canada and Upper Canada were abolished. The Union Act provided that the pre-existing electoral boundaries of Lower Canada and Upper Canada would continue to be used in the new Parliament, unless altered by the Union Act itself.

The Saint Maurice electoral district of Lower Canada was not altered by the Act, and therefore continued with the same boundaries which had been set by a statute of Lower Canada in 1829:

The County of Saint Maurice shall be bounded on the north east by the County of Champlain, on the south west by the north east boundary of the fief du Sablé or York, to the depth of the said fief, and from thence on a line on the same course prolonged to the northern boundary of the Province, and on the south east by the River Saint Lawrence, together with all the islands in the said River Saint Lawrence nearest to the said County, and in whole or in part fronting the same; which County so bounded comprises the Seigniories of Sainte Marguerite, Saint Maurice, Pointe du Lac, Gatineau, Grosbois or Yamachiche, Rivière du Loup, Grand Pré, Fief Saint Jean and its augmentation, Masquinongé, Carufel and part of Lanaudière.

== Members of the Legislative Assembly (1841–1867) ==
Saint Maurice was a single-member constituency.

The following were the members of the Legislative Assembly for Saint Maurice. The party affiliations are based on the biographies of individual members given by the National Assembly of Quebec, as well as votes in the Legislative Assembly. "Party" was a fluid concept, especially during the early years of the Province of Canada.

Parliament	Members	Years in Office	Party
1st Parliament; 1841–1844	Joseph-Édouard Turcotte (Note: Turcotte resigned his seat on December 6, 1841, on accepting an office of profit under the Crown; re-elected in by-election, July 8, 1842: Côté, Political Appointments and Elections in the Province of Canada, 1841 to 1860, p. 59, note (45).)	1841	Anti-unionist; French-Canadian Group
1st Parliament; 1841–1844	Joseph-Édouard Turcotte	1842–1844 (by-election)	French-Canadian Group
2nd Parliament; 1844–1847	François Lesieur Desaulniers	1844–1847	French-Canadian Group
3rd Parliament; 1848–1851	Louis-Joseph Papineau	1848–1851	French-Canadian Group, then Liberal
4th Parliament; 1851–1854	Joseph-Édouard Turcotte	1851–1854	Ministerialist
5th Parliament; 1854–1857	Louis-Léon Lesieur Desaulniers	1854–1863	Bleu
6th Parliament; 1858–1861	Louis-Léon Lesieur Desaulniers	1854–1863	Bleu
7th Parliament; 1862–1863	Louis-Léon Lesieur Desaulniers	1854–1863	Bleu
8th Parliament; 1863–1867	Charles Gérin-Lajoie	1863–1867	Anti-Confederation; Rouge

== Redistribution and abolition ==
The Saint Maurice electoral district lost some of its original territory in the redistribution of seats in 1853, when the new electoral district of Maskinongé was created.

The district was abolished on July 1, 1867, when the British North America Act, 1867 came into force, splitting the Province of Canada into Quebec and Ontario. It was succeeded by electoral districts of the same name in the House of Commons of Canada and the Legislative Assembly of Quebec.

== See also ==
- List of elections in the Province of Canada
