= George Davison (merchant) =

Canadian businessman

George Davison (died February 21, 1799) was a businessman and political figure in Quebec. His surname also sometimes appears as Davidson.

He came to Quebec around 1773 and acquired lands in the seigneury of Rivière-du-Loup. He was in business in partnership with his older brother Alexander. Davison was named to the Legislative Council of Quebec in 1783. During the 1780s, he operated a farm on a large estate near the current site of Louiseville, Quebec. He served as a director of the Quebec Agricultural Society, formed in 1789. In 1786, the two brothers were given a lease for the king's posts on the north shore of the lower Saint Lawrence River. Davison returned to England in 1791, while he still had business interests in Canada and, with his brother, held a contract to supply the British forces in North America. With David Monro and Mathew Bell, he took over the lease of the Saint-Maurice ironworks from his brother in 1793.

He died in London in 1799.
