= Gérin 1936 Varivol biplane =

Varivol

General information
- Type: Research biplane
- National origin: France
- Designer: Jacques Gerin
- Status: Destroyed
- Number built: 1

History
- First flight: 1936 march

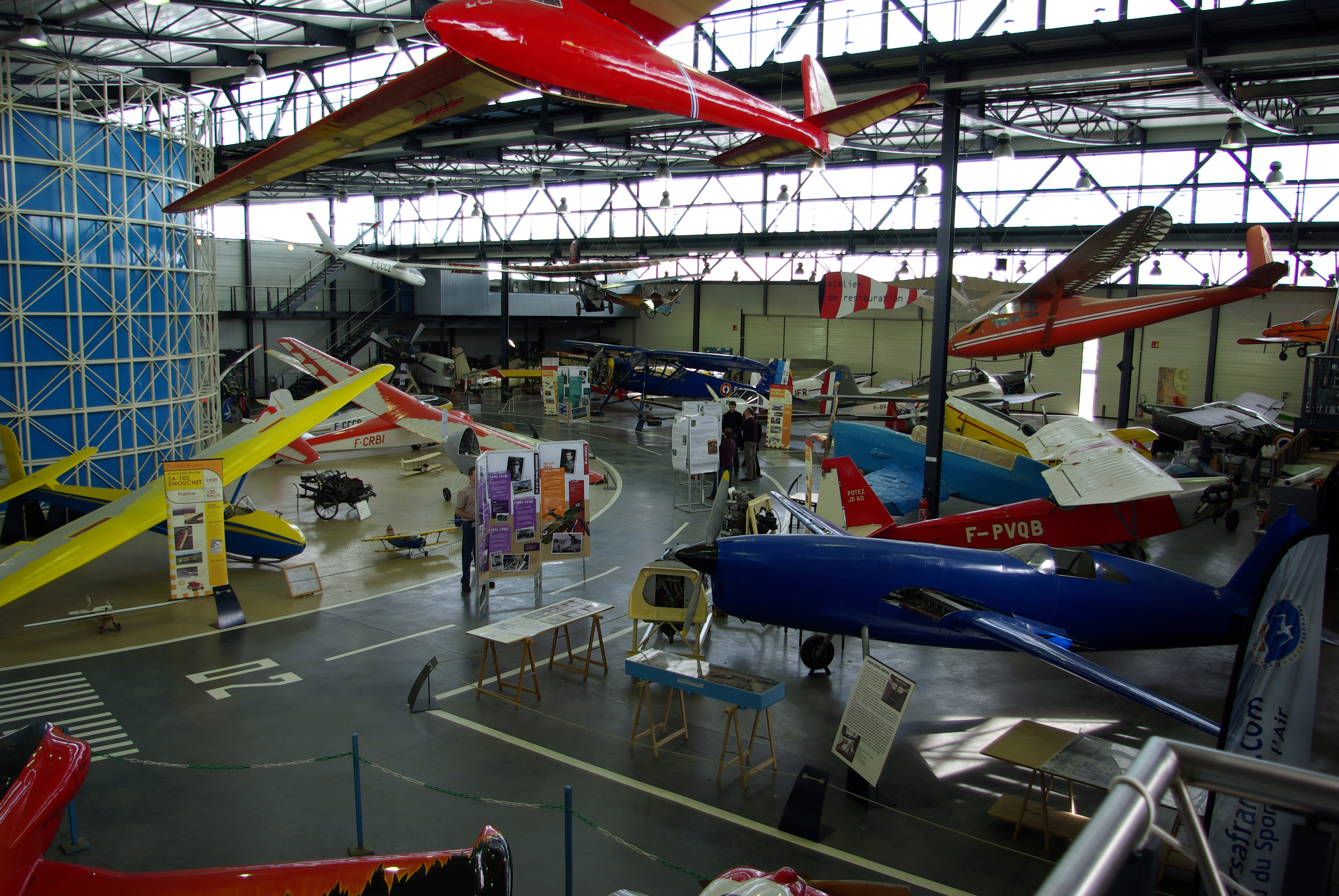
Gérin Varivol V.6e (blue monoplane at lower right) at the Musée Espace Air Passion at Angers in France

The Gerin Varivol was a 1930s French research aircraft designed and built by Jacques Gerin. Only one aircraft was flown during 1936 before it was destroyed in an accident.

== Design and development ==
The Varivol was an odd looking biplane with a deep and bulky fuselage with a knife edge rear where the rudder was attached and a braced variable-incidence tailplane was mounted on top of the rear fuselage. The unique feature of the aircraft were the two narrow-chord biplane wings in an inverted sesquiplane configuration. The wings were wire-braced and had one interplane strut on each side. The upper wing normally had an area of 6.30 m^{2} (67.8 sq ft) but additional flexible surfaces inside the fuselage could be extended using an electrical motor to increase the wing area to 26 m^{2} (280 sq ft). It was also possible to change the camber of the wings when extended. The Varivol was powered by a 230 hp (172 kW) Salmson radial piston engine with a two-bladed propeller.

It was first tested in a wind tunnel at Chalais-Meudon before starting test flying in March 1936. The aircraft continued to fly successfully until November 1936 when it was destroyed in a fatal crash, an investigation determined the accident was not due to the variable-area wings.

== Further developments ==
Further development of the Varivol concept was carried out with the Gérin 1938 V.6E Varivol Racer a sleek monoplane racing aircraft that was built just prior to and during World War II, being put into storage after the war. The aircraft can be seen at the Musée Espace Air Passion at Angers in France.

== Specifications ==
Data from Orbis

General characteristics

- Length: 7.74 m (25 ft 5 in)
- Wingspan: 11.77 m (38 ft 7 in)
- Height: 3.50 m (11 ft 6 in)
- Wing area: 6.30 m^{2} (67.8 sq ft) variable up to 26.00 m^{2}
- Empty weight: 1,000 kg (2,205 lb)
- Max takeoff weight: 1,300 kg (2,866 lb)
- Powerplant: 1 × Salmson 9-cylinder radial piston, 170 kW (230 hp)
- Propellers: 2-bladed

Performance

- Maximum speed: 298 km/h (185 mph, 161 kn)
