= Valère Guillet =

Canadian politician

Valère Guillet (1796 – February 26, 1881) was a notary and political figure in colonial Quebec. He represented Saint-Maurice in the Legislative Assembly of Lower Canada from 1830 to 1836 as a supporter of the Parti patriote.

He was born in Batiscan, Lower Canada, the son of Jean-Baptiste Guillet and Marguerite Langlois. He was educated at the Séminaire de Nicolet, studied law with his brother Louis and was admitted to practice as a notary in 1825. Guillet practiced in Saint-Pierre-les-Becquets, Yamachiche and Trois-Rivières. He supported the Ninety-Two Resolutions. Guillet was coroner for Trois-Rivières district from 1836 to 1878. From 1847 to 1862, he was secretary for the Chambre des notaires for Trois-Rivières and Saint-François districts; Guillet was president from 1862 to 1868. He died at Trois-Rivières at the age of 84.

His sister Marie married Alexis Rivard, another member of the legislative assembly.
