= Conrad Gugy =

Dutch-Canadian political figure

The Hon. Conrad Gugy (c. 1734 – 10 April 1786) was a Dutch-Canadian political figure who was secretary to Sir Frederick Haldimand in the Province of Quebec colony and a seigneur.

== Early life ==
He was born at The Hague, the eldest son of Hans George Gugi (b.1700), of Zuben Thurgau, a Swiss Captain of the Guards who later joined the Dutch service, and his Dutch wife, Thérèse Reis. Gugy purchased a commission in the Dutch army before joining a newly formed British regiment, the King's Royal Rifle Corps as a lieutenant in 1756, serving under General James Wolfe at Quebec in 1759.

== Life in Canada ==
He remained in Canada, and having been trained for the Engineers and as an accomplished linguist, he was chosen by Sir Frederick Haldimand, who became military governor of Trois-Rivières, Quebec in 1763, to be his secretary. He resigned this position the following year and bought the seigneury of Grandpré with part of the seigneury of Grosbois-Ouest, where he built a manor house. Both seigneurs were in Yamachiche, Quebec. In 1771, he purchased Dumontier, next to Grosbois-Ouest; Frédérick, located behind Pointe-du-Lac, and some lands forming part of Rivière-du-Loup. He was appointed a Justice of the Peace in 1765.

Gugy remained loyal to the British crown during the American Revolution, but was nonetheless harassed by various sympathizers of the cause. One of his tenants on his estate at Rivière-du-Loup accused him of threatening to whip anyone who supported the Americans, but his name was cleared after a trial. In 1776, when the Americans were retreating, they burned some buildings on his seigneuries.

In 1778, when refugees started arriving from across the border, with the marked approval of the now Governor of Canada, his old friend Sir Frederick Haldimand, Gugy erected dwellings and a school on his seigneuries at Yamachiche, Quebec, to house them. Gugy's reasoning was "to the end of having an eye on them", and this appealed to Haldimand who did not like the idea of the refugees intermingling with the local populace during those uncertain times.

Gugy was appointed to the first Legislative Council of Quebec at its inception in August, 1775, retaining the post until his death. In 1783, he had taken a lease out on the ironworks of Saint Maurice, but died three years later.

== Personality and death ==
Conrad Gugy was described as a man of "large heart and hospitable to a fault". In those early days in Canada, transport and taverns were rare, but Gugy enthusiastically received travellers, without distinction, into his home and hospitably entertained them. He loved horses, and was known to have made a gift of them to mark the pleasure which he had taken in the society of an occasional guest.

Towards the end of his life, the owner of a neighbouring fief claimed that Gugy had been responsible for wilful damage to his property during the construction of buildings for the American refugees. In 1787, Gugy's seigneuries were put up for auction to pay the damages for which the jury had held him liable. Shortly after, however, the judgement was reversed, and his seigneuries were saved, but it was too late for him. In Sketches of Celebrated Canadians, it was reported that following the verdict,

He gently made his way through the crowd, and, going to his lodgings, without speaking one word, entered his room and locked the door. On its being burst next morning, his cravat was founded neatly folded upon an arm of the sofa, upon which he lay in a reclining position, stone dead. He had not committed suicide; but, proud and sensative, he was absolutely killed by the humiliation of such a verdict.

Though Conrad Gugy was not married, his seigneuries were left to Elizabeth Wilkinson, who lived with him at his manor house. After her death, by his will, they were to pass to his brother, but as he had predeceased her, they were passed on to Conrad's nephew, Louis Gugy.

In 1980, a street - Rue Conrad Gugy - was named for him in Yamachiche, Quebec.
