= Marie Lacoste Gérin-Lajoie =

Canadian feminist and professor (1867-1945)

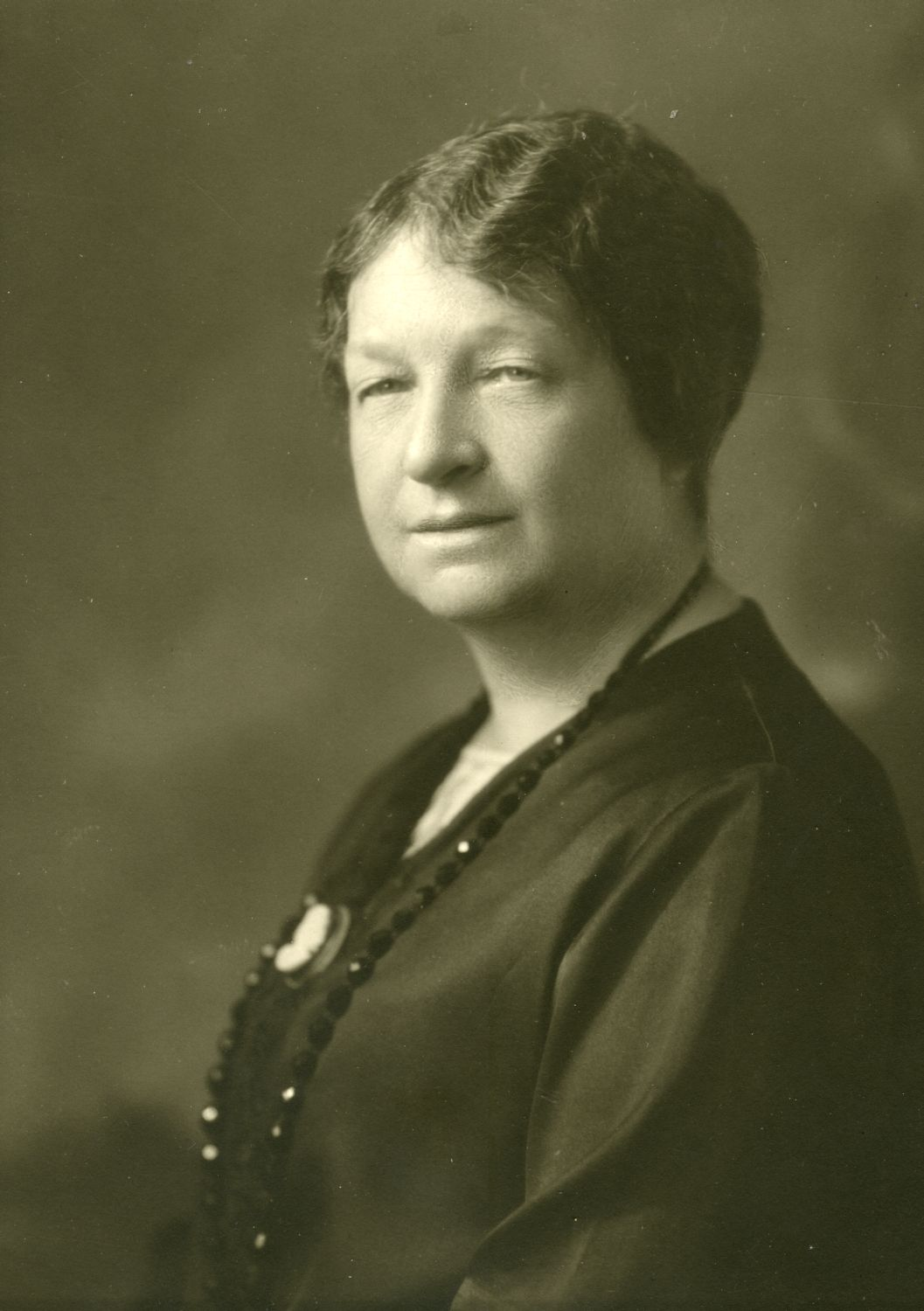
- Marie Lacoste Gérin-Lajoie, 1920
- Born: October 19, 1867; Quebec, Canada
- Died: November 1, 1945 (aged 78); Quebec, Canada
- Occupation: Academic
- Spouse: Henri Gérin-Lajoie (m. 1887; died 1936)
- Children: 4
- Parents: Alexandre Lacoste (father); Marie-Louise Globensky (mother)
- Relatives: Marie-Joséphine Gérin-Lajoie (daughter); Justine Lacoste-Beaubien (sister); Thaïs Lacoste-Frémont (sister); Louis Lacoste (paternal grandfather)

Marie Lacoste Gérin-Lajoie (19 October 1867 – 1 November 1945) was a Canadian feminist. She was a self-taught legal expert (her father and husband were both lawyers, and she had access to their books). She was a pioneer of the feminist movement in Québec who co-founded the Fédération nationale Saint-Jean-Baptiste with Caroline Dessaulles-Béique (in 1907), an organization which campaigned for social and political rights for women.

== Personal life ==
Gérin-Lajoie was the daughter of Marie-Louise Globensky and Alexandre Lacoste. Lacoste came from a wealthy Catholic French Canadian family and focused her self-studying on the history of women and the law. She married a lawyer, Henri Gérin-Lajoie, on the condition that he give her the freedom to continue her campaign for women's rights. She was 20 when they married. The couple raised four children.

== Education ==
Gérin-Lajoie was born into a bourgeois family due to the successful career of her father, Alexandre Lacoste. At a young age, she accompanied her mother to upper class charity activities. Over time, at these events, she learned about issues such as poverty and women's lack of power to create their own futures.

At nine years old, she join the convent in Hochelaga and graduated from it at the age of fifteen in 1883 During this time, there were no francophone Catholic university programs in Quebec for women but Marie had a thirst for knowledge. She continued her studies in her father's extensive library. She would read on topics as varying as physics, the classics and eventually law to become a self-taught legal expert in her later life.

== Career ==
A key belief that guided Gérin-Lajoie's career was the conviction that the civil law was extremely unjust to women especially women who married. During this time in history, after being married, a woman would be transferred from the guardianship of her father to her husband. She would have little legal power and also no right to consent. This would make the women incompetent dependents on the men which Marie Lacoste Gérin-Lajoie thought was inherently wrong.

=== Popular publications ===
In Traité de Droit usuel (1902), Gérin-Lajoie writes about everyday law that affects everyone. This book was a part of her mission to educate young women about the law that would rule their lives as wives, mothers, workers and such. This book once translated into English was distributed widely to schools, women's groups and even political offices. It became the manual for activists who wanted to reform laws targeting women's rights. Additionally, she attempted to use this book as a tool to introduce the subject of law to school curricula.

Her second legal work was La femme et le code civil, in 1929. She argued against the subordinate legal position of married women. In this time, women had no control over their own financial assets and no legal input into the financial affairs of their families. She wanted to grant more rights to married and separated women so they could control their own property, and act as legal guardians to minors.

Additionally, Gérin-Lajoie wrote for la bonne parole, a monthly periodical for Fédération nationale Saint-Jean-Baptiste. First published in 1913, this periodical included articles written to educate women on their rights and to fight for legal reform.

=== Major organizations ===
==== Montreal Local Council of Women (MLCW) ====
In 1893, Gérin-Lajoie joined the Montreal chapter of The National Council of Women of Canada (NCWC). This was her first time joining an organized movement that saw the women's rights as a topic of utmost importance in contemporary society. However, living in a primarily Catholic province, and participating in an anglophone, non-denominational organization was not easy. In the MLCW, she aided in leading awareness campaigns focused on increasing the categories of women allowed to vote in Montreal municipal elections and also in campaigns protecting the rights of female workers. Additionally, she fought for women's rights to higher education and the right to have a job. Her time in the MLCW as well as her interest in the law and women's inferior status inspired her to write Traité de Droit usuel in 1902.

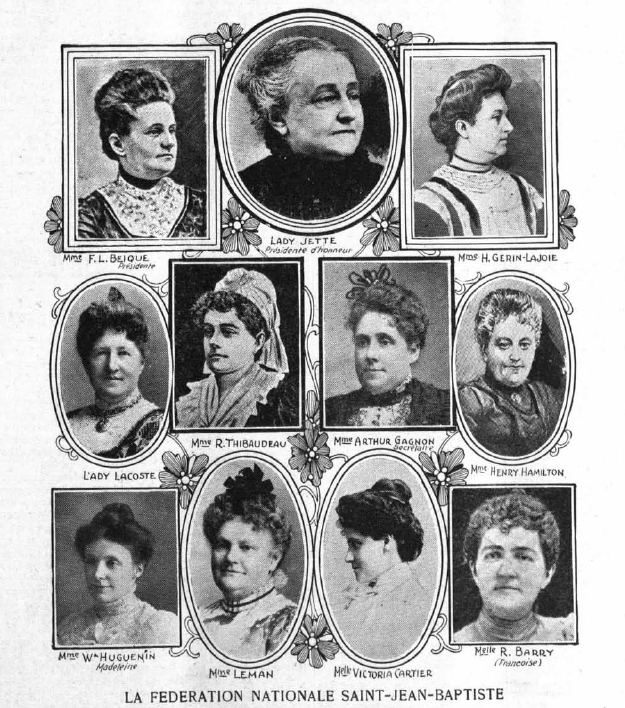
Marie Lacoste Gérin-Lajoie was member of the First presidential board, Fédération nationale Saint-Jean-Baptiste, Montréal, 1907.

==== Fédération Nationale Saint-Jean-Baptiste (FNSJB) ====
Fédération Nationale Saint-Jean-Baptiste was Gérin-Lajoie's attempt at creating an alliance of women's groups, after gaining inspiration and experience with the NCWC. She believed that with FNSJB she could push for more women to engage in charitable activity and become truly successful at eradicating the sources of their mistreatment. FNSJB was founded in 1906 and Lacoste Gérin-Lajoie was the organization's secretary until 1913. The Federation was an early advocate for women's suffrage in provincial elections. In addition to its legal work, the Federation nationale also championed social causes such as providing milk for children and mothers, fighting alcoholism and illness, raising awareness of infant mortality, and various other issues that affected women's lives.

==== Provincial Franchise Committee ====
With the president of the MLCW, Lacoste Gérin-Lajoie created the Provincial Franchise Committee. This committee led a delegation to Québec city in 1922 to support a bill giving women the right to vote. The bill, however, never passed and Lacoste Gérin-Lajoie stepped down from her position as head of the francophone section of the committee the same year.

=== Other achievements ===
In addition to her campaign for more legal rights for women, Gérin-Lajoie also played a part in arguing for French-language university education for the women of Quebec. Partly in response to her actions, the Quebec Catholic clergy agreed to open the first francophone women's college, in 1908.

==== l'École Enseignement Supérieur pour les Jeunes Filles ====
In 1908, after Lacoste Gérin-Lajoie's pressure on Archbishop Paul Bruchési, she helped found l'École Enseignement Supérieur pour les Jeunes Filles. This was a college for girls under the sisters of the Congrégation de Notre-Dame de Montréal and affiliated with what is now Université de Montréal. In 1911, her daughter, who is also known as Marie Gérin-Lajoie, graduated from the college which made her the first French Canadian woman to earn a Bachelor of Arts in Québec.

== Religion and its influence ==
Gérin-Lajoie was unlike some of her English speaking contemporaries in that she had an extremely religious Catholic background. After all, she was educated in a convent for the first part of her life. She believed that treatment of women in law and society was unjust. Although officials in her religion often taught that women were an "inferior sex" compared with men, she never wavered on her belief that women should be educated and were completely capable of any intellectual endeavor. Overcoming this contradiction between her own beliefs and the official teachings of her church, she concluded that Jesus came to save all the souls on earth and this is because only souls - not women or men - appear before God.

== Legacy ==
Quebec was the last Canadian province to grant the vote to women, in 1940. In 1929, Gérin-Lajoie testified on women's rights before the Dorion Commission. In 1931, the Quebec Civil Code was changed to reflect the changes Gérin-Lajoie had been arguing for. She was designated a Person of National Historic Significance by the Historic Sites and Monuments Board of Canada in 1998.

In 1992, Quebec City established the Parc Marie-Gérin-Lajoie, straddling the border of the Neufchâtel Est and Lebourgneuf neighbourhoods of the arrondissement (borough) of Les Rivières. In 1995, Quebec City named a street in her honour, Rue Marie Gérin Lajoie, in the Cap-Rouge neighbourhood of the Sainte-Foy–Sillery–Cap-Rouge borough.

Gérin-Lajoie's daughter, Marie-Joséphine Gérin-Lajoie (1890–1971), was also active in the Canadian women's rights movement, and was the first French Canadian woman to earn a Bachelor of Arts degree. Mother and daughter are honoured with the singularly named Parc Marie-Gérin-Lajoie in the Montreal borough of Côte-des-Neiges–Notre-Dame-de-Grâce, while Marie-Joséphine was also honoured with her own stamp in the Prominent Canadian Women series (1993) issued by Canada Post.
