= Alexandre Lacoste =

Canadian politician (1842–1923)

The Honourable Sir Alexandre Lacoste PC
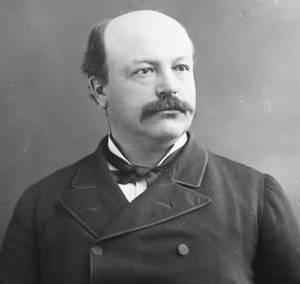

Senator for De Lorimier, Quebec
- In office January 11, 1884 – September 15, 1891
- Appointed by: John A. Macdonald
- Preceded by: Jacques-Olivier Bureau
- Succeeded by: Alphonse Desjardins

Member of the Legislative Council of Quebec for Mille-Isles
- In office March 4, 1882 – December 6, 1883
- Preceded by: Jean-Baptiste Lefebvre de Villemure
- Succeeded by: Charles Champagne

Personal details
- Portfolio: Speaker of the Senate (April 27, 1891 – September 15, 1891)
- Born: January 13, 1842; Boucherville, Canada East
- Died: August 17, 1923 (aged 81); Montreal, Quebec, Canada
- Occupation: Academic
- Political party: Conservative
- Spouse: Marie-Louise Globensky (m. 1866; died 1919)
- Father: Louis Lacoste
- Relatives: Justine Lacoste-Beaubien (daughter); Marie Lacoste Gérin-Lajoie (daughter)

Sir Alexandre Lacoste, PC (January 13, 1842 – August 17, 1923) was a Canadian lawyer, professor, and politician.

He was born in Boucherville, Canada East (now Quebec), in 1842, the son of Louis Lacoste. From 1880 to 1923, he was a professor of law at the Université de Montréal.

In 1882, he was appointed to the Legislative Council of Quebec. In 1884, he was called to the Senate of Canada representing the senatorial division of De Lorimier, Quebec. A Conservative, in April 1891, he was appointed Speaker of the Senate and served until he resigned from the Senate in September 1891 when he was appointed Chief Justice of the Court of Queen's Bench of Quebec. He retired in 1907. In 1892, he was made a Knight Bachelor. He died in Montreal in 1923 and he was entombed at the Notre Dame des Neiges Cemetery in Montreal.

== Family ==
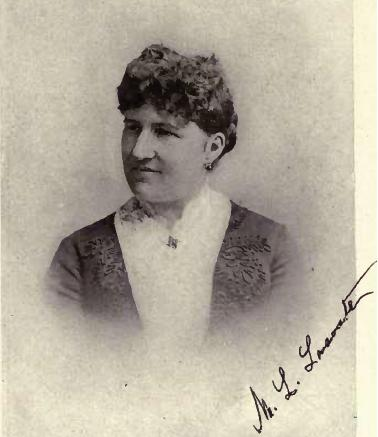
Lady Marie Louise Lacoste (née Globensky) by Arless, Montreal

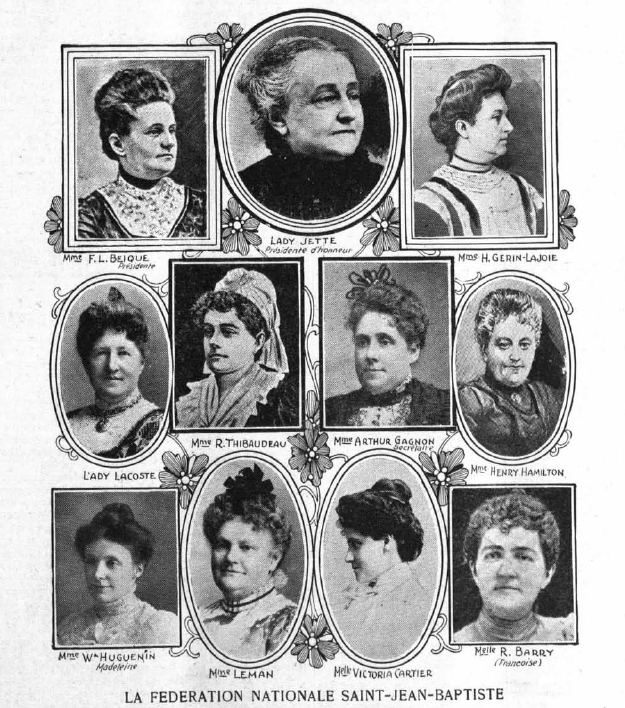
Lady Lacoste was member of the First presidential board, Fédération nationale Saint-Jean-Baptiste, Montréal, 1907

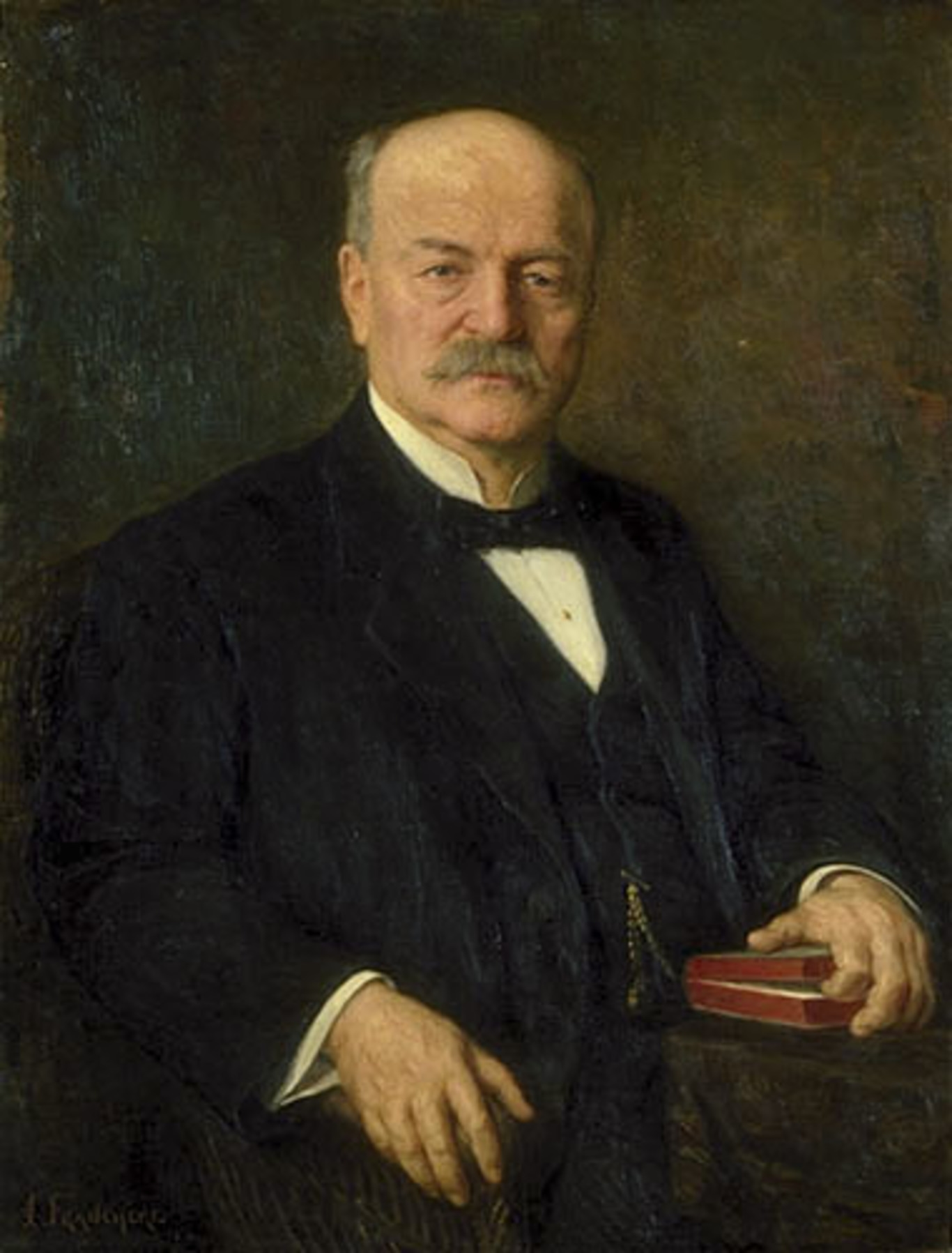
Lacoste in later life; painting by Joseph-Charles Franchère, 1913

Alexandre Lacoste married Marie-Louise Globensky, daughter of Leon Globensky, of Montreal on May 8, 1866. She was member of the First presidential board, Fédération nationale Saint-Jean-Baptiste, Montréal, 1907. She was a member of the Advisory Board of the Parks and Playgrounds Association of Montreal.

The couple's eldest son, Louis Joseph Lacoste, married Bertha Louisa, daughter of M. S. Foley, Esquire, editor-proprietor of the Journal of Commerce. Marie, their eldest daughter, wrote legal text-books and married an advocate, Henri Gerin-Lajoie.

Blanche, their second daughter, married Joseph P. Landry, son of Senator Landry. Another daughter, Justine, married Louis de Gaspe, son of Hon. Louis Beaubien. Justine Lacoste-Beaubien was a founder of the children's hospital Sainte-Justine Hospital.
