= Louis Picotte =

Canadian politician

Louis Picotte (May 4, 1780 – May 7, 1827) was a farmer, merchant and political figure in Quebec. He represented Saint-Maurice in the Legislative Assembly of Lower Canada from 1820 to 1824 as a member of the Parti canadien.

He was born in Rivière du-Loup (later Louiseville), the son of Jean-Baptiste Picotte, an Acadian refugee, and Hélène DeJarlais. Picotte was a voyageur in the Northwest with McTavish, Frobisher and Company. In 1810, he married his second cousin Archange Déjarlais. Picotte established a butcher shop in Trois-Rivières around 1813. He died in Rivière-du-Loup at the age of 47.
