= Saint-Maurice (federal electoral district) =

Former federal electoral district in Quebec, Canada

Quebec electoral district

Defunct federal electoral district
- Legislature: House of Commons
- District created: 1966
- District abolished: 2003
- First contested: 1968
- Last contested: 2000

Saint Maurice (French pronunciation: [sɛ̃ mɔʁis]) was a federal electoral district (riding) in Quebec, Canada, that was represented in the House of Commons from 1867 to 1896. Saint-Maurice was a federal electoral district in Quebec, that was represented in the House of Commons from 1968 to 2004.

The electoral district of Saint Maurice was formed in 1867, the continuation of the pre-confederation electoral division with the same delimitation. In 1892, it was merged with the district of Trois-Rivières to form Three Rivers and St. Maurice.

A Saint-Maurice district was re-established in 1966 out of the former districts of Champlain and Saint-Maurice—Laflèche. The district was abolished in 2003 when it was redistributed into Berthier—Maskinongé and Saint-Maurice—Champlain ridings.

A high-profile MP was the former Prime Minister of Canada, Jean Chrétien, who represented the riding of Saint-Maurice—Laflèche for five years and the riding of Saint-Maurice for 29 years.

== Members of Parliament ==
This ridings elected the following members of Parliament:

Parliament	Years	Member	Party
Saint Maurice
1st	1867–1868	Louis-Léon Lesieur Désaulniers	Conservative
1st	1868–1872	Élie Lacerte	Conservative
2nd	1872–1874	Élie Lacerte	Conservative
3rd	1874–1878	Charles Gérin-Lajoie	Liberal
4th	1878–1882	Louis-Léon Lesieur Désaulniers	Conservative
5th	1882–1887	Louis-Léon Lesieur Désaulniers	Conservative
6th	1887–1891	François-Sévère Lesieur Désaulniers	Conservative
7th	1891–1896	François-Sévère Lesieur Désaulniers	Conservative
Riding dissolved into Three Rivers and St. Maurice
Saint-Maurice; Riding re-created from Champlain and Saint-Maurice—Laflèche
28th	1968–1972	Jean Chrétien	Liberal
29th	1972–1974	Jean Chrétien	Liberal
30th	1974–1979	Jean Chrétien	Liberal
31st	1979–1980	Jean Chrétien	Liberal
32nd	1980–1984	Jean Chrétien	Liberal
33rd	1984–1986	Jean Chrétien	Liberal
33rd	1986–1988	Gilles Grondin	Liberal
34th	1988–1993	Denis Pronovost	Progressive Conservative
34th	1993–1993	Denis Pronovost	Independent
35th	1993–1997	Jean Chrétien	Liberal
36th	1997–2000	Jean Chrétien	Liberal
37th	2000–2004	Jean Chrétien	Liberal
Riding dissolved into Berthier—Maskinongé and Saint-Maurice—Champlain

== Election results ==
=== Saint Maurice, 1867–1886 ===
1867 Canadian federal election
Party	Candidate	Votes
Conservative	Louis-Léon Lesieur Désaulniers	acclaimed
Source: Canadian Elections Database

Canadian federal by-election, 30 October 1868 On Mr. Désaulniers' resignation, 29 September 1868
Party	Candidate	Votes	%
Conservative	Élie Lacerte	679	61.84
Unknown	E. Gérin	419	38.16

1872 Canadian federal election
Party	Candidate	Votes
Conservative	Élie Lacerte	acclaimed
Source: Canadian Elections Database

1874 Canadian federal election
Party	Candidate	Votes	%
Liberal	Charles Gérin-Lajoie	575	52.46
Conservative	Élie Lacerte	521	47.54
Source: lop.parl.ca

1878 Canadian federal election
Party	Candidate	Votes	%
Conservative	Louis-Léon Lesieur Désaulniers	811	52.59
Unknown	S.J. Remington	731	47.41

1882 Canadian federal election
Party	Candidate	Votes	%
Conservative	Louis-Léon Lesieur Désaulniers	842	65.37
Unknown	Pierre Lamy	446	34.63

1887 Canadian federal election
Party	Candidate	Votes	%
Conservative	François-Sévère Lesieur Désaulniers	918	58.51
Liberal	L.A. Lord	651	41.49

1891 Canadian federal election
Party	Candidate	Votes	%
Conservative	François-Sévère Lesieur Désaulniers	894	54.41
Independent Conservative	Louis-Léon Lesieur Désaulniers	749	45.59

=== Saint-Maurice, 1968–2004 ===
1968 Canadian federal election
Party	Candidate	Votes	%
Liberal	Jean Chrétien	13,895	44.52
Ralliement créditiste	Alphonse Poulin	12,198	39.08
Progressive Conservative	Guy Germain	4,570	14.64
New Democratic	Jean-Guy Lalancette	550	1.76

1972 Canadian federal election
Party	Candidate	Votes	%
Liberal	Jean Chrétien	19,840	56.66
Social Credit	Guy Germain	11,363	32.45
Progressive Conservative	Antonio Genest	2,227	6.36
New Democratic	Robert McLeod	1,032	2.95
Not affiliated	Pierre Drolet	552	1.58

1974 Canadian federal election
Party	Candidate	Votes	%
Liberal	Jean Chrétien	20,465	65.26
Social Credit	Antonio Genest	5,471	17.45
Progressive Conservative	Richard Durand	3,501	11.16
New Democratic	Claude De Carufel	1,442	4.60
Not affiliated	Pierre Rousseau	482	1.54

1979 Canadian federal election
Party	Candidate	Votes	%
Liberal	Jean Chrétien	27,243	71.06
Social Credit	Pierre-André Hamel	6,837	17.83
Progressive Conservative	R. Armand Charbonneau	2,795	7.29
New Democratic	Robert Deschamps	952	2.48
Union populaire	Pierre Chénard	351	0.92
Marxist–Leninist	Normand Beaudoin	160	0.42

1980 Canadian federal election
Party	Candidate	Votes	%
Liberal	Jean Chrétien	27,356	76.70
Progressive Conservative	R. Armand Charbonneau	2,516	7.05
Social Credit	Normand Lafrenière	2,369	6.64
New Democratic	Edgar Paquette	1,963	5.50
Rhinoceros	J.F. le Calife De Vernal	1,206	3.38
Union populaire	Lionel C. Laporte	161	0.45
Marxist–Leninist	Normand Beaudoin	95	0.27

1984 Canadian federal election
Party	Candidate	Votes	%
Liberal	Jean Chrétien	24,050	58.88
Progressive Conservative	Roger Armand Charbonneau	14,468	35.42
New Democratic	Danielle Delbecque	1,433	3.51
Parti nationaliste	Alain Déry	892	2.18

Canadian federal by-election, 29 September 1986 On Mr. Chrétien's resignation, 27 February 1986
Party	Candidate	Votes	%
Liberal	Gilles Grondin	19,608	58.90
Progressive Conservative	Robert Leclerc	6,666	20.02
New Democratic	Claude Rompré	6,484	19.48
Parti nationaliste	Louise Gravel	428	1.29
Independent	John Turmel	104	0.31

1988 Canadian federal election
Party	Candidate	Votes	%
Progressive Conservative	Denis Pronovost	18,741	45.30
New Democratic	Claude Rompré	12,463	30.12
Liberal	Yvon Milette	10,168	24.58

1993 Canadian federal election
Party	Candidate	Votes	%
Liberal	Jean Chrétien	25,200	54.06
Bloc Québécois	Claude Rompré	18,896	40.54
Progressive Conservative	Pauline B. Daneault	1,909	4.10
Natural Law	Christian Simard	372	0.80
New Democratic	Robert Des Champs	236	0.51

1997 Canadian federal election
Party	Candidate	Votes	%
Liberal	Jean Chrétien	22,266	47.30
Bloc Québécois	Yves Duhaime	20,664	43.89
Progressive Conservative	Denis Vincent	3,657	7.77
New Democratic	Eric Hébert	489	1.04

2000 Canadian federal election
Party	Candidate	Votes	%	±%	Expenditures
Liberal	Jean Chrétien	23,345	54.07		$60,591
Bloc Québécois	François Marchand	16,821	38.96		$57,038
Alliance	Jean-Guy Mercier	1,461	3.38		$500
Progressive Conservative	Pierre Blais	866	2.24		$50
New Democratic	Raymond Chase	359	0.83		none listed
Communist	Sylvain Archambault	223	0.52		$187
Total valid votes		43,175	100.00		
Total rejected ballots		1,640			
Turnout		44,815	72.50		
Electors on the lists		61,810			
Sources: Official Results, Elections Canada and Financial Returns, Elections Canada.

== See also ==
- List of Canadian electoral districts
- Mauricie
- Historical federal electoral districts of Canada
- Politics of Quebec

Parliament of Canada
Preceded by Vancouver Centre	Constituency represented by the Prime Minister; 1993 – 2003	Succeeded by LaSalle—Émard
