= Yamachiche =

- Municipality
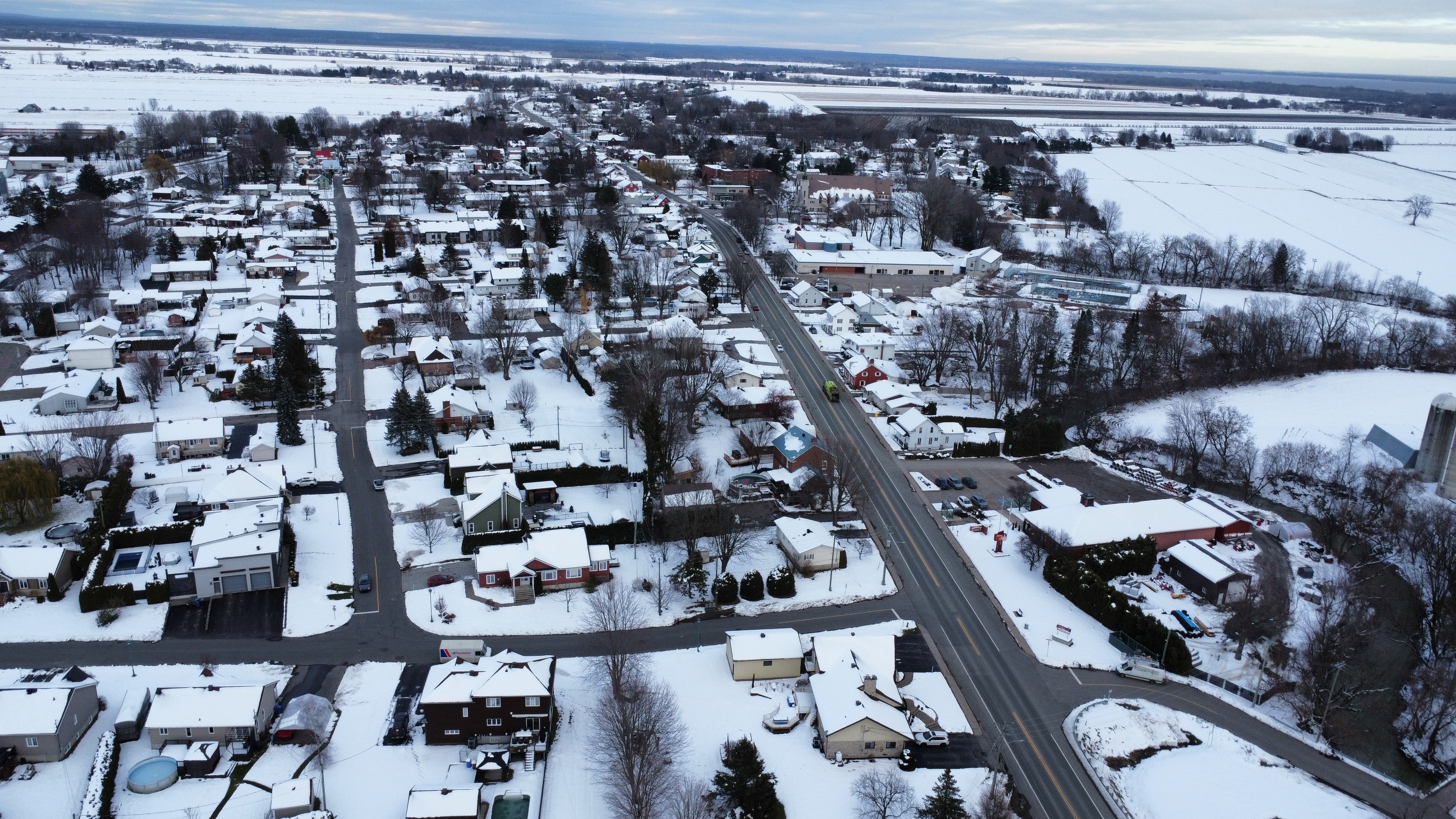
- Motto: Harmonie et Fierté ("Harmony and Pride")
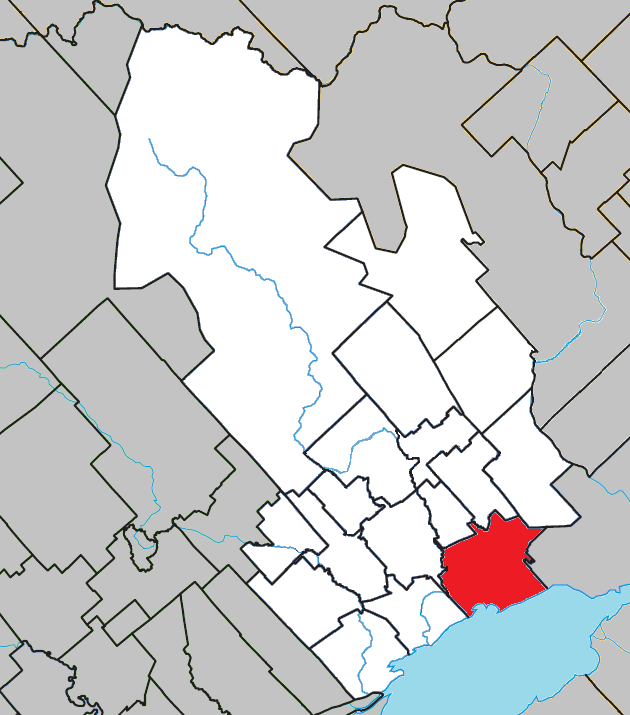
- Location within Maskinongé RCM

- Location in central Quebec
- Coordinates: 46°16′N 72°50′W
- Country: Canada
- Province: Quebec
- Region: Mauricie
- RCM: Maskinongé
- Settled: 1702
- Constituted: December 26, 1987

Government
  - Mayor: Steeve Boulanger
  - Fed. riding: Berthier—Maskinongé
  - Prov. riding: Maskinongé

Area
  - Total: 107.02 km^{2} (41.32 sq mi)
  - Land: 106.39 km^{2} (41.08 sq mi)
  - Urban: 1.85 km^{2} (0.71 sq mi)

Population (2021)
  - Total: 2,813
  - Density: 26.4/km^{2} (68/sq mi)
  - Urban: 1,222
  - Urban density: 661.4/km^{2} (1,713/sq mi)
  - Change 2016-21: ▼0.6%
  - Dwellings: 1,273
- Time zone: UTC−5 (EST)
  - Summer (DST): UTC−4 (EDT)
- Postal code(s): G0X 3L0
- Area code(s): 819
- Highways A-40: R-138 R-153
- Website: www.yamachiche.ca

Yamachiche (French pronunciation: [jamaʃiʃ]) is a municipality in the Mauricie region of the province of Quebec in Canada.

== Etymology ==
The name Yamachiche was first used to identify the Little Yamachiche River (Petite rivière Yamachiche) which runs through the town. It came from the First Nations (possibly Cree) words iyamitaw (meaning "much") and achichki (meaning "mud"). Therefore Yamachiche could have the general meaning of "muddy river", which is a characteristic of this stream. In Abenaki, it was identified as Namasis (small fish) and Obamasis (small white fish).

The name has gone through many spelling variations: Machiche, Ouabmachiche, Yabamachiche, Hyamachiche, Yamachiste, Amachis, à Machis, à Mashis, Machis, Augmachiche, Ouamachiche, Yabmachiche, etc., which have mainly affected the name of the river, whereas the parish and municipal names have remained more stable.

== History ==
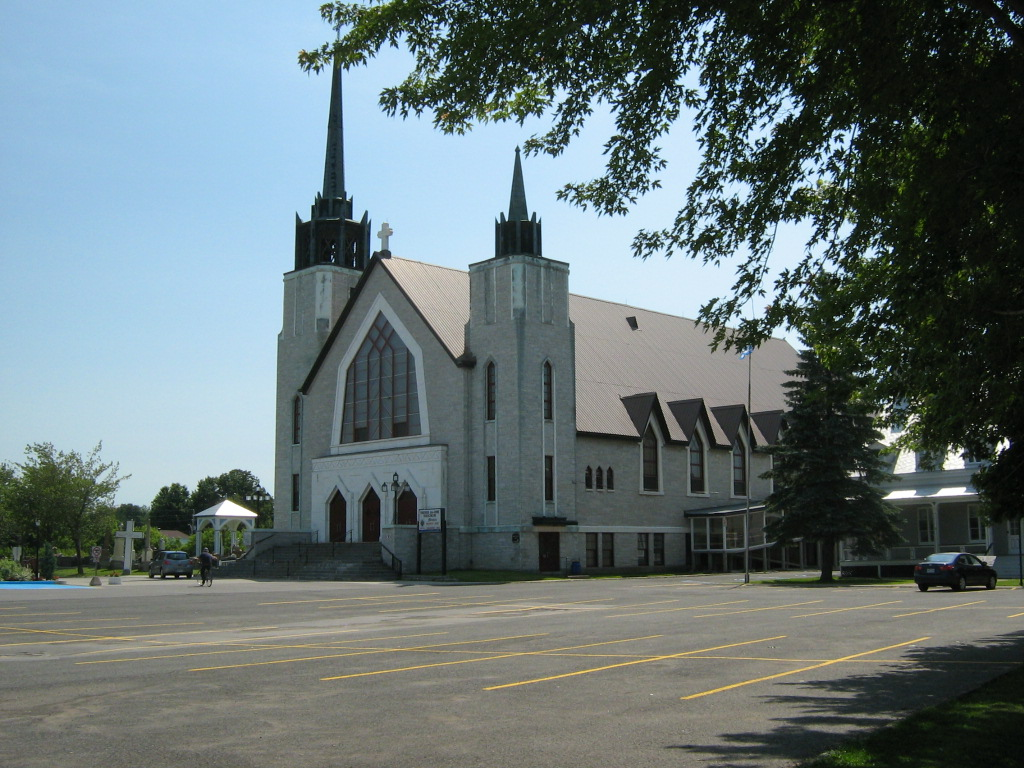
Church of Sainte-Anne-d'Yamachiche, replacing the original, built in 1794

In 1653, the area was part of a fief granted to Pierre Boucher de Grosbois, Governor of Trois-Rivières, and in 1672, it was formally ceded to Grosbois. The Grosbois or Machiche Seignory was 1.5 leagues long by 2 leagues deep along the shores of Lac Saint-Pierre. But because of war with the Iroquois First Nation, it could not be colonized until the beginning of the 18th century.

In 1703, the first colonists, the three Gélinas brothers, settled in the area and by 1706, there were 7 families. The same year, the name Yamachiche first appeared in the census. In 1711, the first chapel was built, dedicated to Sainte Anne by Récollet Siméon Dupont, and the Parish of Sainte-Anne was formed in 1722. A year later, the settlement consisted of about 20 families and 100 persons.

In 1725, the Chemin du Roy (French for "King's Highway") was built connecting it with Louiseville and Pointe-du-Lac. In 1764, the West Grosbois Seignory was purchased by Conrad Gugy, thereby becoming the first French-Canadian Seignory in English possession. Between 1765 and 1790, Yamachiche grew quickly with new settlers from Acadia (Acadians expelled by the English) and from the United States, particularly Loyalists from Massachusetts.

In 1828, the Saint-Barnabé and Saint-Sévère Parishes were formed by separating from the Sainte-Anne-d'Yamachiche Parish. In 1831, the post office opened. In 1845, the Municipality of Yamachiche was founded but abolished in 1847. It was reestablished in 1855 as the Parish Municipality of Sainte-Anne-d'Yamachiche, with Francois Gerin-Lajoie as first mayor. In 1878, the first train came to Yamachiche, followed by the telegraph in 1880.

In 1887, the village separated from the parish municipality and became the Village Municipality of Yamachiche, with George Felix Heroux as first mayor. In 1895, telephone was installed in Yamachiche and street lighting in 1904.

In 1973, the railway station (Canadian Pacific) closed, but in 1975, the new Quebec Autoroute 40 opened, providing access to Yamachiche with 3 interchanges. In 1987, the village and parish municipalities were merged to form the current Municipality of Yamachiche.

== Demographics ==
Historical census populations – Yamachiche

Year	Pop.	±%
1991	2,784	—
1996	2,776	−0.3%
2001	2,631	−5.2%
2006	2,760	+4.9%

Year	Pop.	±%
2011	2,787	+1.0%
2016	2,830	+1.5%
2021	2,813	−0.6%

Source: Statistics Canada

Private dwellings occupied by usual residents (2021): 1,208 (total dwellings: 1,278)

Mother tongue (2021):

- English as first language: 0.7%
- French as first language: 96.8%
- English and French as first languages: 0.4%
- Other as first language: 1.4%

== List of mayors ==
Yamachiche's first local government was established in 1855. From 1887 to 1987, Yamachiche was divided into a parish municipality and a village municipality. Each entity had its own local council and its own mayor. Both structures were merged in 1988 with only one municipal council and one mayor. Officially, municipal elections in Yamachiche are on a non-partisan basis.

Parish Municipality of Sainte-Anne-d'Yamachiche

#	Mayor	Took office	Left office
1	François Gérin-Lajoie	1855	1858
2	Joseph Lacerte	1858	1860
3	Charles Lajoie	1860	1864
4	Madore Gélinas	1864	1868
5	Raphaël Boucher	1868	1870
6	Georges-Horace Proulx	1870	1872
7	Héli-Léonard Héroux	1872	1875
8	Joseph Bellemare	1875	1877
9	Alexandre Daveluy	1877	1878
10	François-Sévère Lesieur Desaulniers	1878	1879
11	François Lacerte	1879	1880
12	Antoine Lamy	1880	1881
13	Thomas Ricard	1881	1882
14	Louis Dussault	1882	1884
15	Arthur Lacerte	1884	1885
16	Joseph Lapointe	1885	1886
17	Élie Lacerte	1886	1887
18	Thomas Dufresne	1887	1889
10	François-Sévère Lesieur Desaulniers	1889	1892
19	Esdras Lamy	1892	1896
20	George L. Duchêne	1896	1907
21	Honoré Lapointe	1907	1912
22	Jean-Baptiste Fréchette	1912	1913
23	Théodore Bourassa	1913	1914
24	Thomas A. Lamy	1914	1915
25	Élie Bellemare	1915	1917
26	Georges Proulx	1917	1921
27	Joseph L. Desaulniers	1921	1923
25	Élie Bellemare	1923	1925
28	Alexandre Gignac	1925	1929
29	Omer E. Milot	1929	1933
30	Joseph Gauthier	1933	1935
31	Alcide Bellefeuille	1935	1937
32	Alide L. Desaulniers	1937	1939
33	Henri P. Milot	1939	1941
32	Alide L. Desaulniers	1941	1949
34	Clovis Héroux	1949	1953
32	Alide L. Desaulniers	1953	1959
35	Fleurimond Pellerin	1959	1961
36	Philias Isabelle	1961	1967
37	Gaston Houle	1967	1973
36	Philias Isabelle	1973	1978
38	Marcel Duchesne	1978	1979
39	Jacques Landry	1979	1986
40	André Chainé	1986	1987

Village Municipality of Yamachiche

#	Mayor	Took office	Left office
1	Georges Félix Héroux	1887	1899
2	Arthur Héroux	1899	1900
3	Pierre Gaspard Bellemare	1900	1901
4	Napoléon Pellerin	1901	1905
5	Joseph Boucher	1905	1906
6	Adrien Milot	1906	1908
7	Moïse Carbonneau	1908	1908
4	Napoléon Pellerin	1908	1909
8	Napoléon Bellemare	1909	1910
9	Hyacinthe Trahan	1910	1912
10	Napoléon Samson	1912	1912
11	Eugène Lesieur	1912	1916
12	Victor Descôteaux	1916	1919
13	Didier St-Louis	1919	1921
14	Pierre Bellemare	1921	1923
15	Hercule Descôteaux	1923	1925
16	Dionis Villemure	1925	1927
17	Eugène Maillette	1927	1929
18	Raoul Duchesne	1929	1931
14	Pierre Bellemare	1931	1935
19	Charles-Édouard Girardin	1935	1943
20	Omer St-Louis	1943	1951
21	J. Sylvio Villemure	1951	1953
20	Omer St-Louis	1953	1957
22	Émile Pellerin	1957	1961
23	Charles-Denis Girardin	1961	1973
24	Roland Girardin	1973	1982
25	Raymond Bellemare	1982	1987

Merged municipality

#	Mayor	Taking Office	Leaving
1	André Chainé	1988	1991
2	Louise A. Bellemare	1991	1999
3	Michel Isabelle	1999	2017
4	Paul Carbonneau	2017	2025
5	Steeve Boulanger	2025	current

== Notable people from Yamachiche ==
- Louis-Onésime Loranger (1837-1917), a Canadian politician
- Nérée Beauchemin (1850–1931), poet and physician
- Antoine Gérin-Lajoie (1824–1882), poet and novelist
- Sévère Rivard (1834–1888), a Canadian politician and businessman
