= Lower Canada Tories =

Political groupings in Lower Canada

Tories; Château Clique; Parti bureaucrate; "British" Tories
- Founded: Early 19th century
- Dissolved: 1855 (approximate)
- Succeeded by: None
- Ideology: Toryism; Monarchism; Oligarchy; Imperialism; Colonialism; British assimilationism
- Colony: Lower Canada, British North America

Lower Canada Tories is a general name for individuals and parliamentary groups in Lower Canada, and later in the Province of Canada's division of Canada East, who supported the British connection, colonialism, and a strong colonial governor. They generally favoured assimilation of French-Canadians to British culture, laws, and the English language, and opposed democracy.

== Château Clique ==
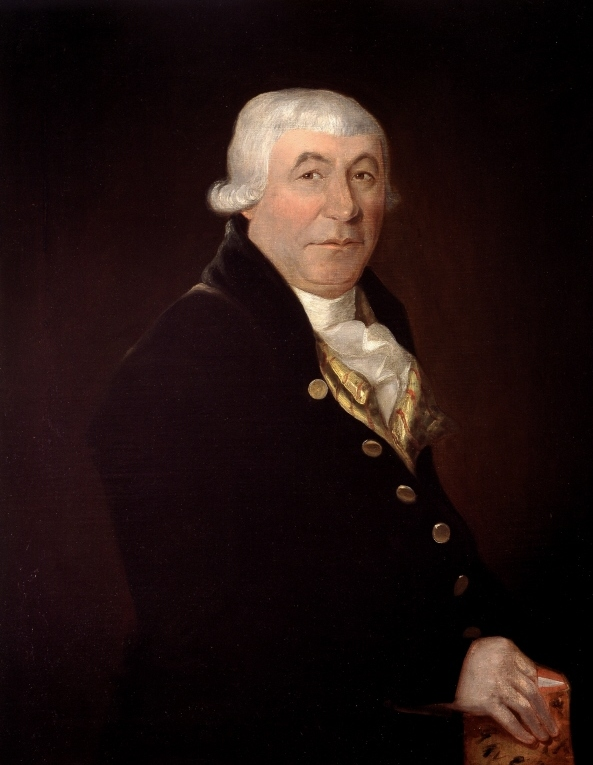
James McGill, a leading member of the Château Clique

The Château Clique, or Clique du Château, was a group of wealthy families in Lower Canada in the early 19th century. They were the Lower Canada equivalent of the Family Compact in Upper Canada.

Like the Family Compact, the Château Clique gained most of its influence after the War of 1812. Most of its families were British merchants, but some were French Canadian seigneurs who felt that their own interests were best served by an affiliation with this group. Some of the most prominent members were brewer John Molson and James McGill, the founder of McGill University. Generally, they wanted the French Canadian majority of Lower Canada to assimilate to English culture. That included the abolition of the seigneurial system, replacing French civil law with English common law, and replacing the established Catholic Church with the Anglican Church. Their efforts led to the Act of Union (1840), which ultimately failed in its attempt to assimilate all French Canadians but succeeded in preventing their political and economic interests from prevailing over those of Britain. The Château Clique also had control over the Crown lands and the clergy reserves but much less than the Family Compact because of the already-existing seigneurial system.

== Parliamentary groups ==
They were also known on the electoral scene as the Parti bureaucrate (Bureaucratic Party), also known as the British Party or the Tory Party.

== Constitutional framework ==
The Constitutional Act of 1791 had established three branches of government: the Legislative Assembly, an elected lower house; the Legislative Council, an appointed upper house; and the Executive Council, which acted as a kind of cabinet for the lieutenant governor. The governor was appointed by the British Crown, and he appointed members of the Clique as his advisers. The Clique was also able to establish itself in the Legislative Council, leaving the Legislative Assembly, made up of a majority of French-Canadian representatives, with little or no power.

== Lower Canada Rebellion ==
Louis-Joseph Papineau, as a reformer in the Assembly, was one of the fiercest opponents of the Château Clique. His struggles against the Clique and the Lieutenant Governor, Lord Gosford, led to the Lower Canada Rebellion in 1837.

After the rebellion, Upper and Lower Canada were united as the Province of Canada, but the Château Clique did not disappear. Indeed, the union was explicitly intended to exclude French Canadians from power, as the English-speaking population became the majority in the United Canadas. The British-appointed governors still expected the French Canadian population to assimilate. Canada East, as Lower Canada was called after the union, eventually gained some political independence with the responsible government of Robert Baldwin and Louis-Hippolyte Lafontaine, which took control of the executive government away from the Clique.

== Other members ==
- Edward Bowen
- Horatio Gates, banker
- Peter McGill
- William McGillivray, fur trader
- Jacob Mountain, Archbishop of the Anglican Diocese of Quebec
- Jonathan Sewell, member and Speaker of the Legislative Council of Lower Canada
- Charles James Stewart, Archbishop of the Anglican Diocese of Quebec

== See also ==
- History of Quebec
- History of Canada
- Timeline of Canadian history
- Timeline of Quebec history
