= Parti canadien =

Former political party in colonial Quebec, Canada (1806–1837)

Canadian Party / Patriot Party
- Founded: 1806
- Dissolved: 1837
- Succeeded by: Parti rouge
- Headquarters: Montreal, Quebec, Canada
- Ideology: Canadian reformism Classical liberalism Lower Canada nationalism
- Colours: Green, white, red

Party flag

Patriote leader Louis-Joseph Papineau speaks to the crowd at the Assembly of the Six Counties.

The Parti canadien (French pronunciation: [paʁti kanadjɛ̃]) or Parti patriote (pronounced [paʁti patʁiɔt]) was a primarily francophone political party in what is now Quebec founded by members of the liberal elite of Lower Canada at the beginning of the 19th century. Its members were made up of liberal professionals and small-scale merchants, including François Blanchet, Pierre-Stanislas Bédard, John Neilson, Jean-Thomas Taschereau, James Stuart, Louis Bourdages, Denis-Benjamin Viger, Daniel Tracey, Edmund Bailey O'Callaghan, Andrew Stuart and Louis-Joseph Papineau.

== Creation ==
The British Government established two oligarchic governments, or councils, to rule what is today Quebec and Ontario, then called Lower and Upper Canada. Upper Canada was ruled by the Family Compact and Lower Canada by the Chateau Clique. Both groups exerted monopolistic, uncontested rule over economic and political life. The councils were corrupt in their nature by strengthening their dominance by personal use of funds which eventually led to infrastructural problems around Upper and Lower Canada, including land distribution, poor road conditions, and lack of education funding.

Continuous frustration between the councils and the legislative assemblies over language differences and Lower Canada's discontent for treatment of French problems led to the beginning of the Parti Canadien. English merchants and politicians in Canada pushed for an assemblage of the Canada's, which would lead to the assimilation of the French. Louis-Joseph Papineau rallied the people of Lower Canada to sign a petition against the proposition. Papineau later sailed to Britain to present the petition to the British Government and to rally for the rights of the people of Lower Canada, only to have the issue heard with little action to follow. Later, the British Parliament passed the Canada Land and Tenures Act which abolished the feudal and seigneurial systems in British North America. The act left property rights of many land owners in limbo and created much confusion and conflict in Lower Canada where the French Civil Code was in action, and thus infuriating the French people of Lower Canada even more. In July 1830, word of a liberal revolution in France sparked the youth of Lower Canada as liberalism was non-existent in Canada at the time. Upper and Lower Canada governments tried and failed to resolve the recent uprising and tension, even further-distancing the French people of Lower Canada from the English of Upper Canada.

== History ==
Under the leadership of Pierre-Stanislas Bédard, the party campaigned for ministerial responsibility and a responsible government in which the members of the Legislative Council of Lower Canada would be appointed by the Legislative Assembly's majority party. Although the party controlled the assembly in Lower Canada, at that time the council, which held most of the power, was chosen by an appointed British governor, whom the Parti canadien considered to be seriously corrupt and hostile to the interests of the majority of the population.

In 1806, the Parti canadien imitated its political adversaries, the Tory Château Clique, in founding a newspaper named Le Canadien. In 1810, Governor Craig had Bédard and some of his colleagues at the newspaper arrested and imprisoned without trial for a comment published in Le Canadien.

In 1811, James Stuart became leader of the Parti canadien in the assembly and, in 1815, reformer Louis-Joseph Papineau was elected Assembly Speaker. Papineau's reformist ideas gained in authority and popularity as he led the party in its fight against the union of the Canadas proposal in 1822, until the suspension of the Constitutional Act in 1837.

== Parti Patriote ==
In 1826, the party took the name of Parti Patriote, reflecting a much stronger sense of French-Canadian nationalism and a change of strategy. The Patriotes largely favoured agriculture over commercialism and blocked many economic projects led by their adversaries. The party succeeded in delaying development of British capitalism within the colony. However, their positions were often seen as unclear. The party's new strategy was considered too radical even by some of its members, most notably John Neilson, who eventually left the party in 1830.

In 1834, Papineau and the Parti Patriote created the Ninety-Two Resolutions; an extensive list of demands for political reform which was sent to the British government. The British government ignored the resolutions for over three years until in 1837 it countered the Parti Patriote's requests with ten resolutions of its own, called the Russel Resolutions, while rejecting all proposed ninety-two resolutions made by Papineau and his party. These resolutions allowed the colony governor to obtain budgetary estimates without vote of the assembly, which brought about verbal and physical violence, and eventually led to the Rebellions of 1837. After the rebellions, many patriotes were exiled, hanged, or had their houses set ablaze, which marked the end of the party. However many party members became active members in politics of the new Province of Canada.

== Newspapers ==
- Le Canadien (1806–1837)
- La Minerve (1826–1837)
- The Vindicator (1828–1837, originally the sole voice of the Irish Montreal community as The Irish Vindicator until July 1829)
- Le Libéral (1837)
- L'Écho du Pays (1834)
- The Canadian Spectator (The "English speaking voice" of the Parti amongst Anglo-Montreal colonists; 1822-1828)

== See also ==
- Liberalism
- Contributions to liberal theory
- Liberalism worldwide
- List of liberal parties
- Liberal democracy
- Timeline of Quebec history
- Liberalism in Canada
- Lower Canada Rebellion
- List of Canadian political parties
- Parti rouge
- Bloc Québécois
