= Jacob De Witt =

Lower Canada businessman, banker, politician

Jacob de Witt

Member of the Legislative Assembly of Lower Canada for Beauharnois County (two elections)
- In office 1830–1838 Serving with Charles Archambault
- Preceded by: New position
- Succeeded by: Position abolished on suspension of the constitution

Member of the Legislative Assembly of the Province of Canada for Leinster (by-election and general elections)
- In office 1842–1847
- Preceded by: Jean-Moïse Raymond
- Succeeded by: Norbert Dumas

Member of the Legislative Assembly of the Province of Canada for Beauharnois
- In office 1848–1851
- Preceded by: Eden Colvile
- Succeeded by: Ovide Le Blanc

Member of the Legislative Assembly of the Province of Canada for Chateaugai
- In office 1854–1857
- Preceded by: New position
- Succeeded by: Henry Starnes

Personal details
- Born: September 17, 1785 Windham, Connecticut
- Died: March 23, 1859 (aged 73) Montreal, Canada East, Province of Canada
- Party: Lower Canada: Parti patriote Province of Canada: French-Canadian Group
- Spouse: Sophronia Frary
- Children: At least 4 children
- Occupation: Businessman, banker

Jacob De Witt (September 17, 1785 – March 23, 1859) was a businessman, banker and political figure in Lower Canada and Canada East, Province of Canada (now Quebec). Beginning in the hardware trade, he expanded into steamship transportation on the River St. Lawrence and then banking. He was elected to the Legislative Assembly of Lower Canada and generally supported the Parti patriote, but did not participate in the Lower Canada Rebellion of 1837. After the union of Lower Canada and Upper Canada into the Province of Canada, he was elected to the new Legislative Assembly. He initially supported the reform measures of Louis-Hippolyte LaFontaine, but gradually became more radical, ending his political career as member of the Parti rouge and calling for the voluntary annexation of Canada to the United States. He continued in business, particularly banking, until his death in 1859.

== Family and early life ==
De Witt was born in Windham, Connecticut in 1785, son of Henry De Witt and Hannah Dean. His family was of Dutch background, descended from Tjerck Claessen De Witt, who emigrated to New Amsterdam around 1650, during the period of Dutch colonisation. It is not clear when his family moved to Lower Canada, but they were established in Montreal by 1802.

De Witt married Sophronia Frary of Montreal on January 12, 1816, in the Anglican church in Dunham township. The couple had at least four children.

== Commercial and banking interests ==
De Witt's father was a hatter, and De Witt likely began his business career as an apprentice in his father's hat shop. By 1814, he was in a hardware business with a partner, and appears to have profited from the War of 1812. Three years later, the two ended the partnership and he opened his own hardware business. At some point, he took his nephew, Benjamin Brewster, into partnership in the hardware business.

While maintaining his hardware business, De Witt became interested in transportation upriver from Montreal. He likely saw the advantages for his business that improved river transport could bring. From 1816 to 1833, he acquired three steamships that transported goods on the Saint Lawrence River. He also bought land and owned a sawmill in Beauharnois County.

De Witt also became interested in banking. In 1822, he was a charter member of the Bank of Canada, a proposed commercial bank which never began business. In 1833, he and Thomas Storrow Brown petitioned for the establishment of the City Bank of Montreal. Two years later, in 1835, De Witt and another successful businessman, Louis-Michel Viger, entered into a partnership, known as Viger, De Witt et C^{ie}, to form another bank, known as La Banque du Peuple. The initial capitalisation of the Banque was £75,000; De Witt was a significant investor. The Banque was designed to provide easier access to credit for the petit bourgeoisie, farmers and artisans of Lower Canada, breaking the Bank of Montreal's monopoly.

== Political career ==
=== Lower Canada ===
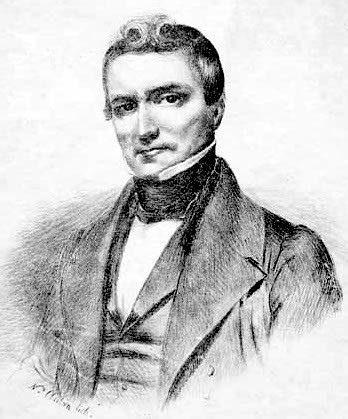
Louis-Joseph Papineau, leader of the Parti patriote

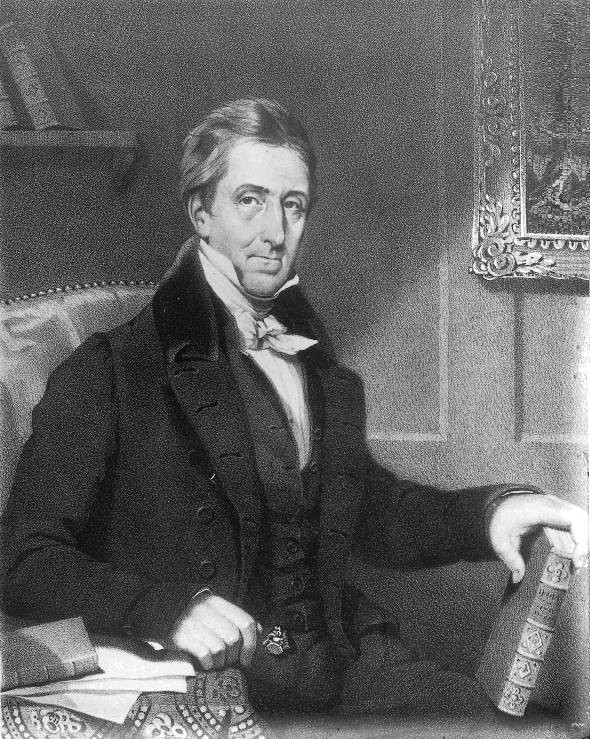
Denis-Benjamin Viger, Patriote leader whose connection to the Banque du Peuple was unclear

De Witt entered politics in the general elections of 1830, when he was elected to represent Beauharnois in the Legislative Assembly of Lower Canada. Of liberal and reform tendencies, he supported the Parti patriote led by Louis-Joseph Papineau and Denis-Benjamin Viger, and their challenges to the appointed Governor of Lower Canada. In the 1834 session, he voted in support of the Ninety-Two Resolutions, presented by Papineau. The Resolutions were directed to the British government and set out a detailed critique of the colonial constitution. They called for major changes, such as an elective Legislative Council. The Assembly passed the Resolutions by a large majority, 56 to 24. In the general elections in the fall of 1834, De Witt was re-elected in Beauharnois with a comfortable margin, part of a major victory by the Parti patriote across the province.

De Witt was a reformer, but he was not a revolutionary, and not inclined to take actions that would put at risk his businesses. He did not take part in the Lower Canada Rebellion of 1837. Nonetheless, in the heightened political atmosphere of the time, he became involved in the issues. There were suspicions that the Banque du Peuple was funnelling money for arms to the Patriote rebellion, particularly since Louis-Michel Viger's cousin, Denis-Benjamin Viger, was one of the Patriote leaders. Although Denis-Benjamin Viger was not one of the partners in the bank, he was himself wealthy and it was unclear if he had a connection to the bank. Eventually, De Witt and the other partners felt it necessary to publish a sworn deposition, denying that the Bank du Peuple had "lent or supplied funds for the purpose of purchasing arms, in order to destroy and subvert Her Majesty's Government in this Province". Louis-Michel Viger did not sign the deposition, as he had been imprisoned on charges of high treason. There was some suspicion that his imprisonment was an attempt by the government to break the Banque du Peuple.

In response to the Rebellion, the British government suspended the constitution of Lower Canada. De Witt's position as a member of the Legislative Assembly ended on March 27, 1838, when the suspension came into force.

=== Province of Canada ===
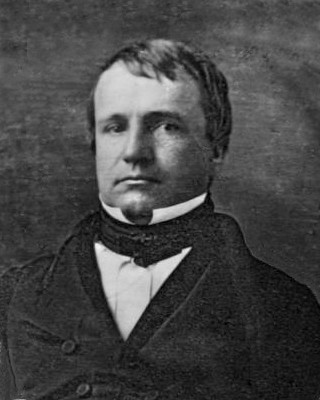
Louis-Hippolyte LaFontaine, leader of the French-Canadian Group

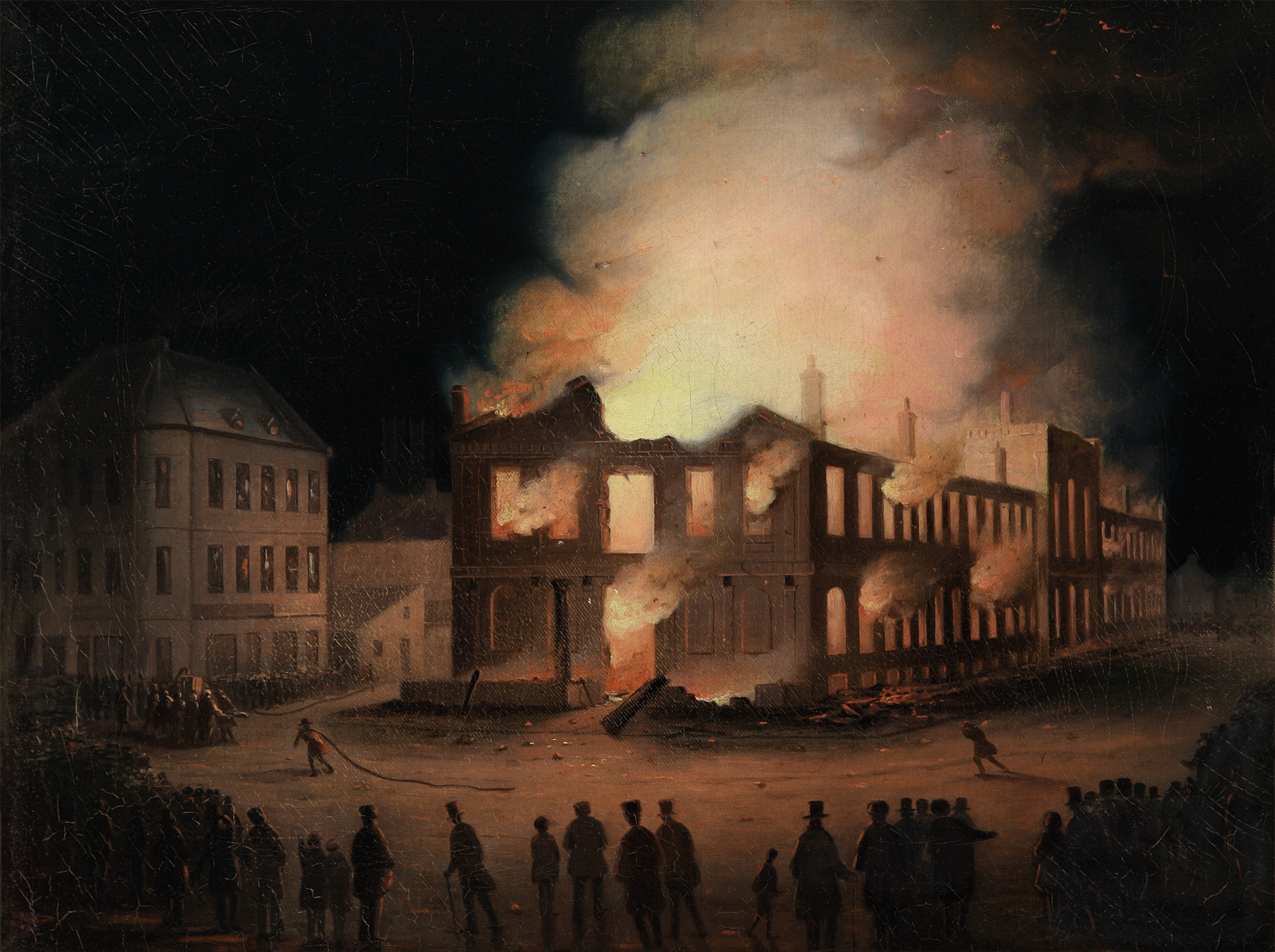
The Parliament buildings in Montreal in flames, after passage of the Rebellion Losses Bill

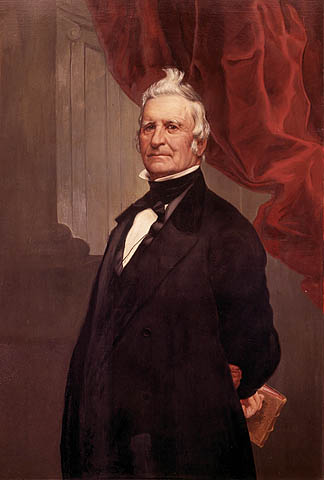
Papineau in later life, leader of the Rouges

Following the rebellion in Lower Canada, and the similar rebellion in 1837 in Upper Canada (now Ontario), the British government decided to merge the two provinces into a single province, as recommended by Lord Durham in the Durham Report. The Union Act, 1840, passed by the British Parliament, abolished the two provinces and their separate parliaments. It created the Province of Canada, with a single Parliament for the entire province, composed of an elected Legislative Assembly and an appointed Legislative Council. The Governor General initially retained a strong position in the government.

In the first general elections in 1841, De Witt stood for election to the new Legislative Assembly, again in the Beauharnois riding. He campaigned as an opponent of the union, but was defeated by a pro-union candidate, John William Dunscomb.

However, the next year De Witt was elected to represent Leinster electoral district in a by-election. During his term, he generally associated himself with LaFontaine and the French-Canadian Group. In 1843, when all but one of the members of the Executive Council resigned in a dispute with the Governor General, Sir Charles Metcalfe, De Witt joined in the motion passed by the Assembly condemning Metcalfe and supporting LaFontaine, Robert Baldwin, and the other ministers.

In the lead-up to the 1844 general elections, De Witt joined campaign functions by the reform groups. He was re-elected and became part of a group of "English" Liberals in the Assembly, who generally supported LaFontaine on major issues. In the general elections of 1848, De Witt switched ridings, and was elected in Beauharnois. De Witt and the "English" Liberals supported the victorious LaFontaine–Baldwin ministry, including in the vote over the Rebellion Losses Bill. The bill was highly controversial. When it received royal assent by Governor General Lord Elgin, Tories rioted in Montreal and burnt the Parliament building.

In the last session before the general elections of 1851, De Witt was one of a small group of members who supported the idea of Canadian independence. The issue did not attract a great deal of attention. In the general elections of 1851, De Witt was defeated by a more moderate reformer, Ovide Le Blanc. In the 1854 elections, he stood for election in a different riding, Chateaugai, and was elected. By this time, he was a supporter of the new Parti rouge, initiated by Papineau. He did not stand for re-election in 1858.

== Later commercial activities ==
De Witt and Louis-Michel Viger continued to operate the Banque du Peuple. In 1843, they obtained a statutory charter for the Banque from the provincial Parliament. De Witt was the principal investor in the Banque and became vice-president in 1845, while Viger was president. When Viger died in 1855, De Witt became president, a position he held until his death in 1859.

In 1846, as part of its move to free trade, the British government repealed the Canada Corn Act 1843, which had given an imperial tariff protection to Canadian grain exports to Britain. The repeal of the imperial preference had a serious negative effect on the economy of the Province of Canada. In response, a movement for voluntary annexation of Canada by the United States began, particularly amongst the Montreal business community. It culminated in the Montreal Annexation Manifesto in 1849. Over 300 Montrealers signed the Manifesto, including De Witt, mainly drawn from the business community. Two years later, De Witt and others in the Assembly argued for the independence of Canada, but to little effect.

Land holdings in Canada East were still largely based on the old seigneurial system, a quasi-feudal system implemented by the French government in the early days of New France. Reform or abolition of the seigneurial system was one of the political issues in the 1840s and 1850s. In 1853, De Witt organised and served as chairman for the Anti-Seigniorial Tenure Convention.

De Witt helped establish the Montreal and Bytown Railway, and was a founder and director of the Montreal City and District Savings Bank. The Montreal and Bytown Railway failed after five years, but the Montreal City and District Savings Bank is still in operation (as of 2024), under the name the Laurentian Bank of Canada.

== Religious and charitable activities ==
De Witt was a Presbyterian. Originally he went to the Saint Peter Street Church in Montreal, but in the 1820s he was one of the founders of the American Presbyterian Church in Montreal. The impetus for the new church was a refusal by De Witt and others to accept a Scottish Presbyterian minister. He was one the administrative board of the American Presbyterian Church, and in 1830 was ordained an elder. He remained with the American Presbyterian Church for the rest of his life, acquiring the nickname of the "Grand old man of the Church". He was also involved in other religious groups, such as the Montreal Temperance Society and the Montreal Auxiliary Bible Society.

De Witt was also involved with charitable organizations in Montreal, such as the Montreal General Hospital, the house of industry, and the Immigration Committee of Montreal, and the Association for the Encouragement of Home Manufactures.

== Death ==
De Witt died in Montreal in 1859. He continued to be active in some of his banking activities until the end of his life. He was buried from the American Presbyterian Church.

== See also ==
- 1st Parliament of the Province of Canada
- 2nd Parliament of the Province of Canada
- 3rd Parliament of the Province of Canada
- 5th Parliament of the Province of Canada
