= La Banque du Peuple =

19th-century Canadian bank

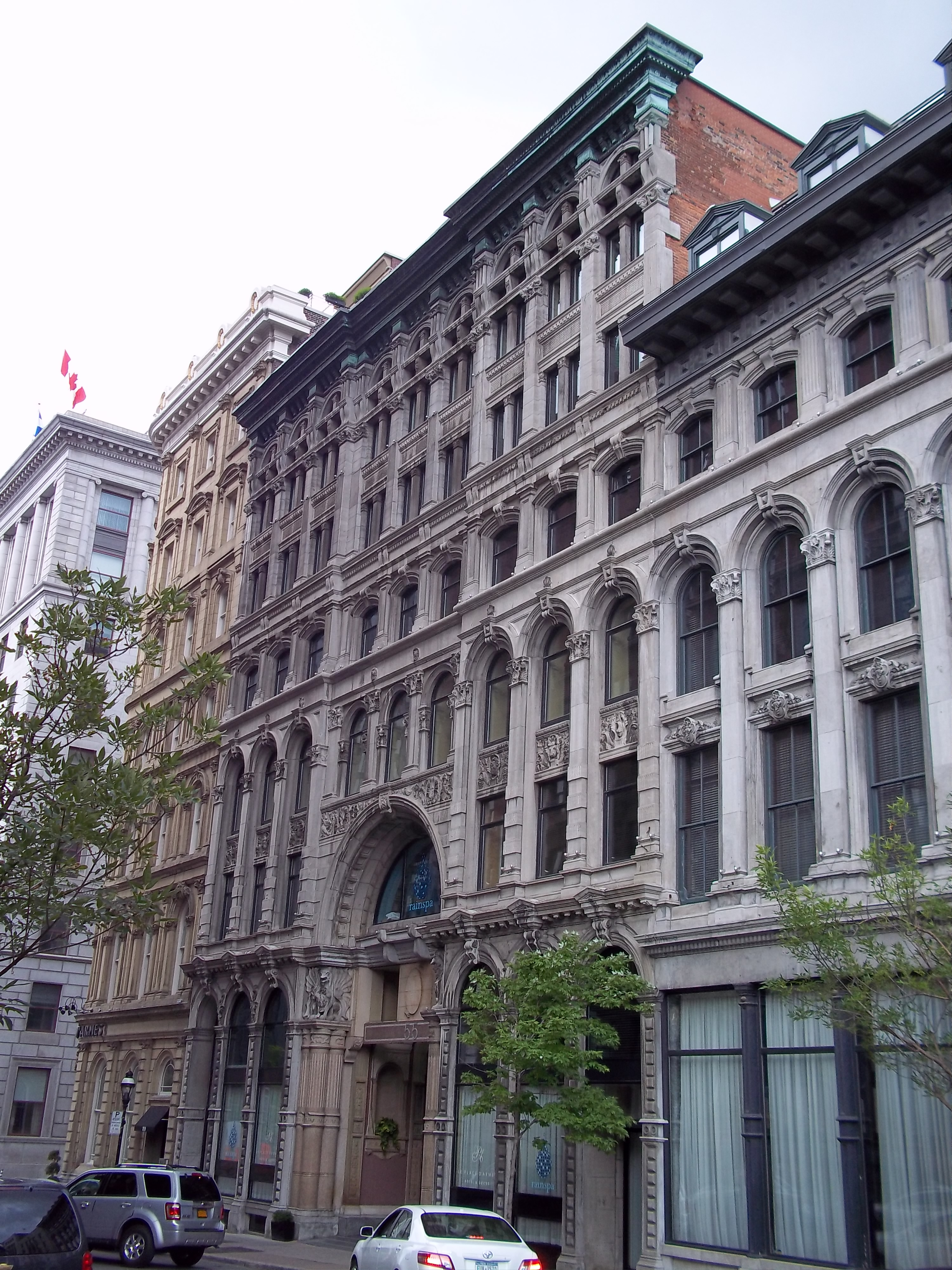
- Formerly: Viger, DeWitt et Compagnie
- Type: Private company
- Industry: Banking
- Founded: 1835 in Montreal
- Founder: Jacob De Witt and Louis-Michel Viger
- Defunct: 1895
- Fate: Collapsed after making large unsecured loans
- Headquarters: Montreal, Canada
- Area served: Montreal
- Key people: J. S. Bousquet (Cashier that initiated the collapse of the bank)
- Products: Banking services, loans

La Banque du Peuple (French pronunciation: [la bɑ̃k dy pœpl], lit. 'The Bank of the People') was a Canadian bank based in Montreal, active from 1835 to 1895.

== History ==
The Banque du Peuple was founded in Montreal in 1835 by Jacob De Witt and the Louis-Michel Viger, initially under the name of Viger, DeWitt et Compagnie, operating as a private bank. Viger was main proponent of the plan, while De Witt was a significant investor. The initial capitalisation of the Banque was £75,000, a large portion coming from De Witt. It was organized by French-Canadian and Scottish reformists who had hitherto been excluded by the English-dominated Tories who comprised the Bank of Montreal's board of directors. It was granted a charter in 1844.

The bank's clientele was predominantly French-speaking and it was a successful example of a French-speaking business in a financial world that was run almost exclusively by the English. In 1843, with the support of Louis-Michel Viger and other Montreal merchants who were keen to develop French-Canadian entrepreneurship, the bank adopted the name of Banque du peuple. It experienced strong growth from the end of the 1840s.

=== Lower Canada Rebellion ===
According to contemporaneous rumors, funds from La Banque du Peuple were used to finance the Lower Canada Rebellion in 1837. At least one historian has suggested that the founding of the bank was designed to forestall rebellion, and the means to peacefully advance the political and economic progress for French-Canadians. Many of the prominent men involved in the founding and early operation of the bank took an active part in the rebellion, and Viger was a cousin of the leader of the reformist Patriote movement, Louis-Joseph Papineau. Another of Viger's cousins, Denis-Benjamin Viger, was also a major Patriote leader and was rumoured to have had an interest in the Banque, to advance the rebellion. Thomas Storrow Brown, an early director of the bank who would go on to participate directly in the rebellion, resigned his position in the bank when external political events rebellion were coming to a head. It has been suggested that Brown was asked to resign so that the bank could disassociate itself from any suspicions as to where its political sympathies lay.

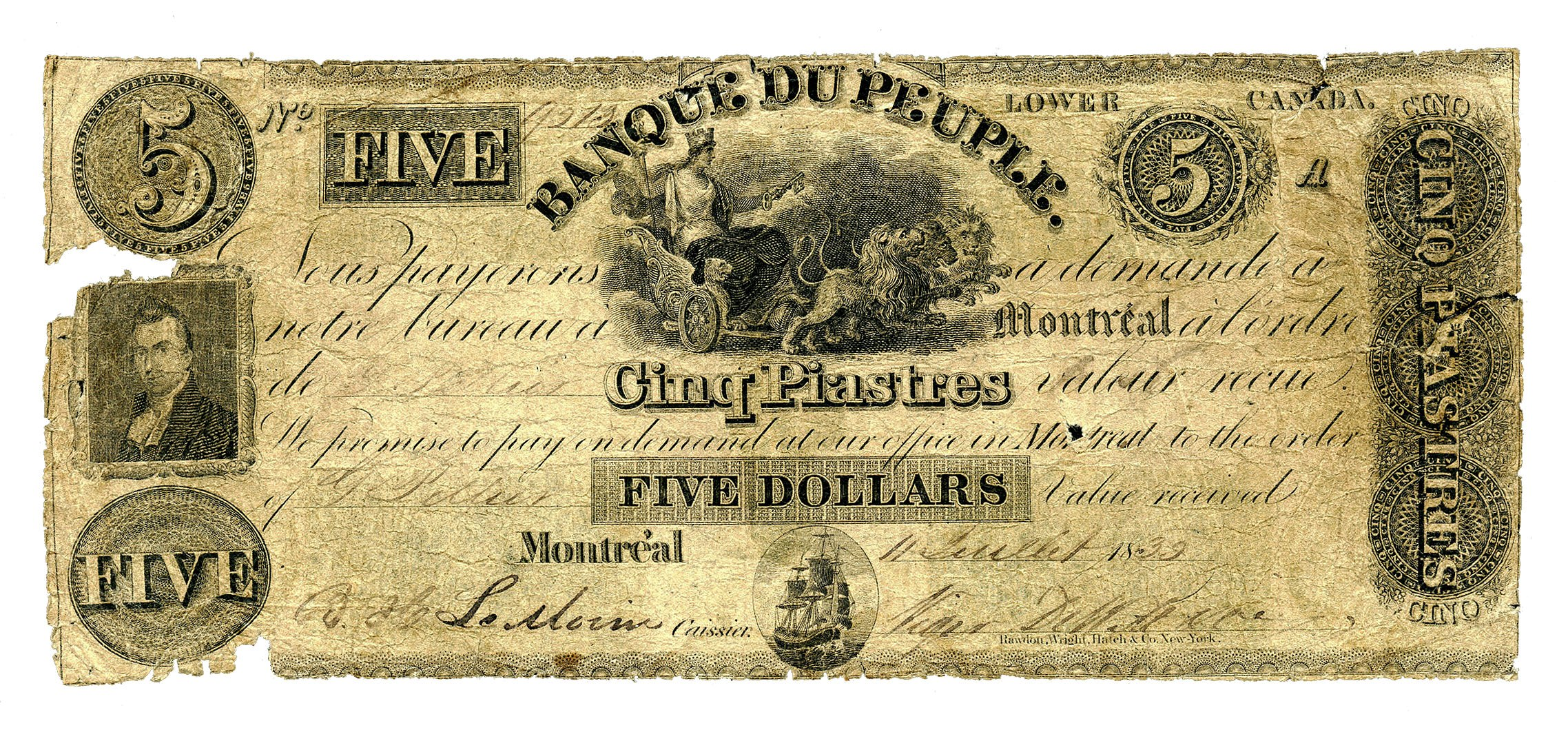
A 5 piastres note issued by la Banque du Peuple, 1839.

The bank vigorously defended itself from these accusations, publishing a statement on behalf of its directors (referenced as "Deponents" below) in the Montreal Gazette on November 25, 1837 that included the following statement:

That the said Deponents perceiving that it has been falsely insinuated and spread in the public, that this Bank had lent or supplied funds for the purpose of purchasing arms, in order to destroy and subvert Her Majesty's Government in this Province, deem it their duty solemnly to affirm that such insinuations are wholly and altogether false and calumnious; the Deponents solemnly denying that this Bank ever did lend or supply any finds for that object, or for any criminal or illegal object whatsoever; and further the Deponents say not, and have signed.

Regardless, many of prominent figures associated with the bank including Louis-Michel Viger, Denis-Benjamin Viger, Côme-Séraphin Cherrier, Édouard-Raymond Fabre, Joseph Roy, and John Donegani were all arrested after the rebellion, though significantly none of them were ever tried.

=== Bank Collapse ===
In 1895, the bank suspended its activities and closed its doors shortly after its cashier J. S. Bousquet abruptly resigned, and shortly afterward it was discovered that he made a large number of large, unsecured loans. In total, the value of these credits was over CA$1,500,000 ($64.2 million in 2025 dollars). Immediately after a public report came out in early 1896 with evidence that Bousquet was guilty of carrying out an unsafe lending policy, he fled to the United States with a large sum of money. The directors of the bank also came under criticism for not properly overseeing the actions of the cashier and preventing what happened. While the bank was able to improve its financial situation in the year after closing public operations, its directors were subject to unlimited liability, meaning that the directors were subject to any debts incurred by the bank, further reducing its ability to gain outside investment. The bank managed to pay those who held the paper notes it issued in full, and in a compromise made to its creditors to release them from full liability, the bank's directors were able to repay 75% of the money owed to its depositors. Following the bank's closure in 1895, several French-Canadian companies were drawn into its downfall. Long legal and political battles followed.

== Building ==
The Banque du Peuple building is located at 53–57, rue Saint-Jacques. (45.505414°N 73.5572119°W)

It was built in two stages. The original head office was built in 1871–72. Its facade was incorporated when the building was enlarged in 1893–94. It appears to the left of the current facade. The building is now occupied by a hotel, Le Place d'Armes.

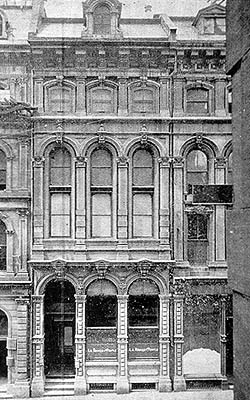
In 1891

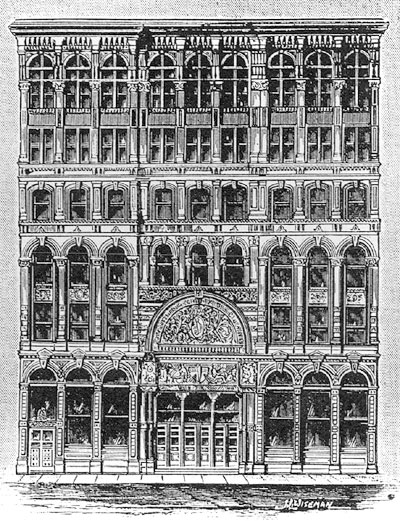
In 1894

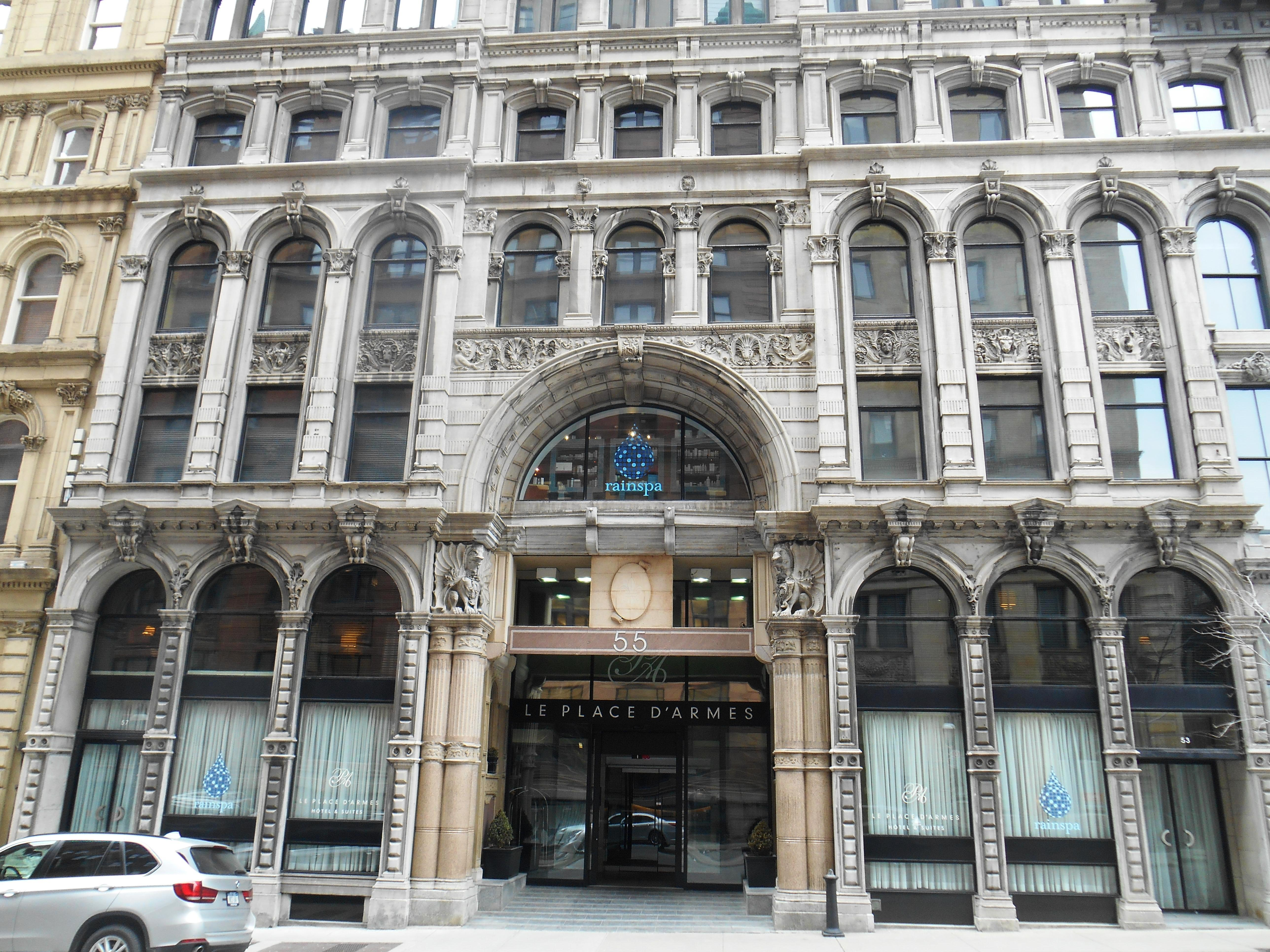
In 2014

== Presidents ==
???? to ????: Jean-Baptiste Prat

== Bibliography ==
- "The Canadian Bank Amendment Act of 1900". The Quarterly Journal of Economics. 14 (4): 543–551. 1900. doi:10.2307/1883425. JSTOR 1883425.
- Chapados-Girard, C. (2020). Canadian Colonial Tokens, 10th Edition. The Charlton Press.
- Greenfield, Robert S. (March 1968). La Banque du Peuple, 1835-1871, and its Failure, 1895 (MA). McGill University.
- Walker, B. E. (1909). A History of Banking in Canada. The Journal of Commerce and Commercial Bulletin.
