= Joseph Roy =

Joseph Roy may refer to:

- Joseph Roy (Lower Canada politician) (1771–1856), businessman and politician in Lower Canada
- Joseph-Edmond Roy (1858–1913), Quebec notary, editor and politician
- Joseph Alfred Ernest Roy (1871–1928), Quebec lawyer and member of the Canadian House of Commons
- Joseph Sasseville Roy (1895–?), Quebec businessman and member of the Canadian House of Commons
- Joseph-Aurélien Roy (1910–2001), Quebec businessman and member of the Canadian House of Commons and Quebec Assembly
- Joseph Roy (bishop) (1925–2004), bishop of the Roman Catholic Diocese of Mysore
- Joseph Raymond Roy, former Canadian ambassador to Afghanistan
