= Beauharnois (Province of Canada electoral district) =

Electoral district in former Province of Canada

Coordinates: 45.249°N 73.988°W

Beauharnois Canada East
Province of Canada electoral district

Defunct pre-Confederation electoral district
- Legislature: Legislative Assembly of the Province of Canada
- District created: 1841
- District abolished: 1867
- First contested: 1841
- Last contested: 1863

Beauharnois (French pronunciation: [boaʁnwa]) was an electoral district of the Legislative Assembly of the Parliament of the Province of Canada, in Canada East, in a rural area south of Montreal. It was created for the first Parliament in 1841 and was based on the previous electoral district of the same name for the Legislative Assembly of Lower Canada. It was represented by one member in the Legislative Assembly.

The electoral district was abolished in 1867, upon the creation of Canada and the province of Quebec.

== Boundaries ==
The electoral district of Beauharnois was south of Montreal (now in the Beauharnois-Salaberry Regional County Municipality), extending south to the boundary with the United States. The town of Beauharnois was the major centre.

The Union Act, 1840, merged the two provinces of Lower Canada and Upper Canada into the Province of Canada, with a single Parliament. The separate parliaments of Lower Canada and Upper Canada were abolished. The Union Act provided that the pre-existing electoral boundaries of Lower Canada and Upper Canada would continue to be used in the new Parliament, unless altered by the Union Act itself.

The Beauharnois electoral district of Lower Canada was not altered by the Act, and therefore continued with the same boundaries which had been set by a statute of Lower Canada in 1829:

The County of Beauharnois shall be bounded on the north east by the said County of Laprairie, on the north west by the River Saint Lawrence, and on the south west and south by the southern boundary of the Province, and shall include the Grande Isle, and all the Islands nearest to the said County, and in whole or in part fronting the same; which County so bounded, comprises the Seigniory of Beauharnois, and the Townships of Hemmingford, Hinchinbrooke, and Godmanchester, and the tract of Indian lands to the west thereof, extending to the Indian Village of Saint Regis, inclusively, on the southern boundary of the Province.

== Members of the Legislative Assembly (1841–1867) ==
Beauharnois was a single-member constituency, represented by one member in the Legislative Assembly.

The following were the members of the Legislative Assembly for Beauharnois. The party affiliations are based on the biographies of individual members given by the National Assembly of Quebec, as well as votes in the Legislative Assembly. "Party" was a fluid concept, especially during the early years of the Province of Canada.

Parliament	Members	Years in Office	Party
1st Parliament; 1841–1844	John William Dunscomb (Note: Resigned on October 8, 1842, following appointment as Warden, Trinity House, Montreal on July 15, 1842: Côté, Political Appointments and Elections, p. 59, note (1).)	1841–1842	Unionist; Government supporter
1st Parliament; 1841–1844	Edward Gibbon Wakefield (Note: Elected in by-election November 9, 1842: Côté, Political Appointments and Elections, p. 59, note (2).)	1842–1844 (by-election)	French-Canadian Group; later "British" Group
2nd Parliament; 1844–1847	Eden Colvile	1844–1847	"British" Tory
3rd Parliament; 1848–1851	Jacob De Witt	1848–1851	"English" Liberal
4th Parliament; 1851–1854	Ovide Le Blanc	1851–1854	Ministerialist, then temporarily in opposition
5th Parliament; 1854–1857	Charles Daoust	1854–1857	"Rouge"
6th Parliament; 1858–1861	Gédéon Ouimet	1858–1861	Bleu
7th Parliament; 1861–1863	Paul Denis	1861–1867	Bleu
8th Parliament; 1863–1867	Paul Denis	1861–1867	Confederation; Bleu

== Abolition ==
The district was abolished on July 1, 1867, when the British North America Act, 1867 came into force, creating Canada and splitting the Province of Canada into Quebec and Ontario. It was succeeded by electoral districts of the same name and boundaries in the House of Commons of Canada and the Legislative Assembly of Quebec.

== See also ==
- List of elections in the Province of Canada
