= Jean-Baptiste Prat =

Canadian businessman and banker

- Born: July 20, 1812; Berthierville, Lower Canada
- Died: July 22, 1876 (aged 64); Montreal, Canada East, Province of Canada
- Occupations: Banker and businessman
- Spouse: Marie-Mathilde Roy (m. 1840)
- Children: 8
- Relatives: Désiré Girouard (son-in-law)

Jean-Baptiste Prat (also known as John Pratt) was a Canadian businessman and banker. He was president of the Banque du Peuple and member of the boards of directors of various companies. He specialized in leather goods.

== Biography ==
Jean-Baptiste Prat was born on 20 July 1812 in Berthierville, Lower Canada to merchant Jean-Baptiste Prat and Marie-Louise Paillé (Paillard).

Prat attended a commercial school in Berthierville and then in 1833 joined his elder brother Charles-Ferdinand who was running a general store in Quebec City. They created C. -F. Pratt & frère on the same year; Jean-Baptiste also opened a branch in Trois-Rivières. In 1839 he established himself in Montreal and launched a third firm, a leather goods firm called John Pratt & Cie, which was successful. The Pratt brothers thus specialized themselves in leather goods. They opened a tannery in Roxton Falls.

Jean-Baptiste was involved in Montreal's business life and became member of the boards of directors of multiple companies, such as Montreal Weaving, Citizens' Insurance Company, Montreal Cotton, Canadian Rubber (Dominion Rubber Company) and Dominion Oil Cloth Company. He was also president of the Banque du Peuple and of the Richelieu and Ontario Navigation Company. He was Montreal harbour commissioner in 1863 and 1874, and still holded the office at his death.

Prat was a philanthropist, and paid for the education of some people and notably supported a school of elementary and industrial draughtsmanship.

Politically Pratt was a liberal, and supported Antoine-Aimé Dorion and others. His opinion in business dealings were well-respected.

He died on 22 July 1876 in Montreal and was buried five days later. By then he was worth $625,000; in majority real estate, but also banks or commercial companies share (half of which were American and devalued by two thirds due to “the prevalent commercial and financial crisis.”

On 3 March 1840 he had married Marie-Mathilde Roy in Montreal, the widow of Charles-Ovide Perrault, with whom he would have eight children (four sons and four daughters). He was father-in-law to Désiré Girouard.
