= Edward Gibbon Wakefield =

English colonial theorist (1796–1862)

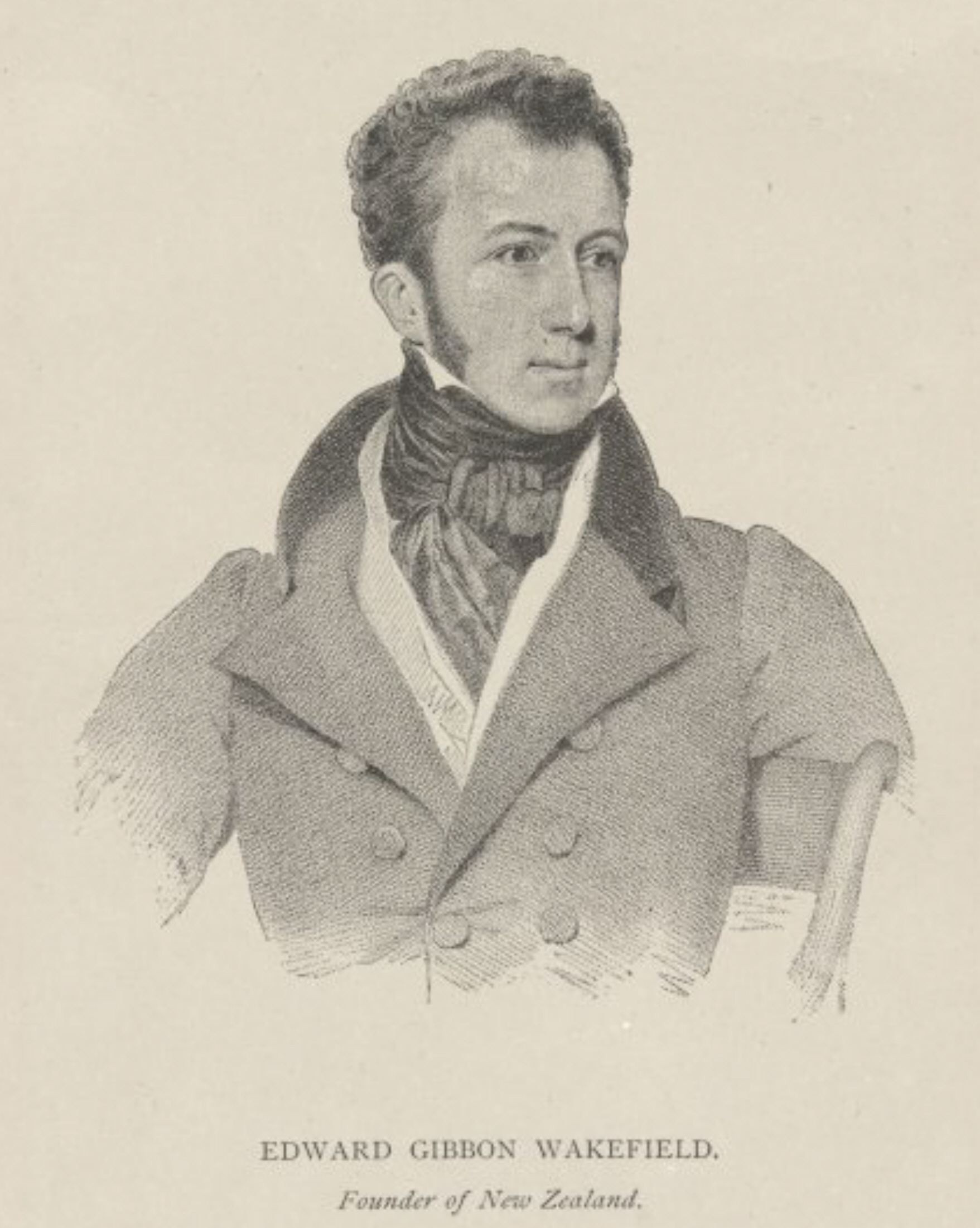

Member of New Zealand Parliament for Hutt
- In office 1853–1855 Serving with Alfred Ludlam
- Succeeded by: Dillon Bell

Member of the Legislative Assembly of the Province of Canada for Beauharnois
- In office 1842–1844 (by-election)
- Preceded by: John William Dunscomb
- Succeeded by: Eden Colvile

Personal details
- Born: 20 March 1796 London, Great Britain
- Died: 16 May 1862 (aged 66) Wellington, New Zealand
- Party: Province of Canada: French-Canadian Group, then "British" Group; New Zealand: Independent
- Spouse: Eliza Pattle (m. 1816; died 1820)
- Children: 1 daughter, 1 son: Jerningham Wakefield

Edward Gibbon Wakefield (20 March 1796 – 16 May 1862) was an English politician in colonial Canada and New Zealand. He is considered a key figure in the establishment in the 1830s, 1840s and 1850s of British colonies in Australia and New Zealand (where he later served as a member of parliament). He also played a role in the history of Canada, being involved in the drafting of Lord Durham's Report and serving as a member of the Parliament of the Province of Canada for a short time.

He was best known for his colonisation scheme, sometimes referred to as the Wakefield scheme or the Wakefield system, which aimed to populate the new colony of South Australia with a workable combination of labourers, tradespeople, artisans and capital. The scheme was to be financed by the sale of land to the capitalists who would thereby support the other classes of emigrants.

Despite being found guilty and imprisoned in 1827 for kidnapping a fifteen-year-old girl, he enjoyed a lengthy career in colonial governments and colonial policy.

== Early life and education ==
Wakefield was born in London in 1796, the eldest son of Edward Wakefield (1774–1854), a distinguished surveyor and land agent, and Susanna Crush (1767–1816). His grandmother, Priscilla Wakefield (1751–1832), was a popular author for the young, and one of the introducers of savings banks.

He was the brother of: Catherine Gurney Wakefield (1793–1873) (who was the mother of Charles Torlesse (1825–1866)); Daniel Bell Wakefield (1798–1858); Arthur Wakefield (1799–1843); William Hayward Wakefield (1801–1848); John Howard Wakefield (1803–1862); Felix Wakefield (1807–1875); Priscilla Susannah Wakefield (1809–1887); Percy Wakefield (1810–1832); and an unnamed child born in 1813.

Wakefield was educated at Westminster School in London, and Edinburgh.

== Early career, marriage and family ==
He served as a King's Messenger, carrying diplomatic mail all about Europe during the later stages of the Napoleonic Wars, both before and after the decisive Battle of Waterloo in 1815.

In 1816, he eloped with a Miss Eliza Pattle and they were subsequently married in Edinburgh. It appears to have been a love match, but the fact that she was a wealthy heiress probably played a part, with Edward receiving a marriage settlement of £70,000 (almost US$7m in 2018 dollars), with the prospect of more when Eliza turned 21.

The married couple, accompanied by the bride's mother and various servants, moved to Genoa, Italy, where Wakefield was again employed in a diplomatic capacity. Here his first child, Susan Priscilla Wakefield, known as Nina, was born in 1817. The household returned to London in 1820 and a second child, Edward Jerningham Wakefield, was born. Four days later Eliza died, and Edward resigned his post. The two children were brought up by their aunt, Wakefield's older sister, Catherine.

Nina was suffering from tuberculosis, and Wakefield took his daughter to Lisbon in Portugal in the hope of recovery. He employed a young peasant girl, Leocadia de Oliveira, whom he later fostered, to help care for Nina, and after Nina's death in 1835, sent Leocadia on to Wellington, New Zealand, where she met John Taine and had 13 children.

== Abduction scandal (1826) ==
Wakefield's abduction of Ellen Turner in The Chronicles of Newgate

Although wealthy by contemporary standards, Wakefield was not satisfied. He wished to acquire an estate and enter Parliament, for which he lacked sufficient capital. Through deception he wed another wealthy heiress in 1826 when he abducted 15-year-old Ellen Turner, after luring her from school with a false message about her mother's health. Wakefield was brought to trial for the case known as the Shrigley abduction in 1826 and, along with his brother William, sentenced to three years in Newgate prison; the marriage, which had not been consummated, was dissolved by a special act of parliament.

== Influence on British colonisation (1829–1843) ==
=== Principles of "systematic colonisation" ===
He turned his attention while in prison to colonial subjects, and considered the main causes of the slow progress of the Australian colonies in the enormous size of the landed estates, the reckless manner in which land was given away, the absence of all systematic effort at colonisation, and the consequent discouragement of immigration and dearth of labour. He proposed to remedy this state of things by the sale of land in small quantities at a sufficient price, and the employment of the proceeds as a fund for promoting immigration. These views were expressed in his Letter from Sydney (1829; published under a false name), published while he was still in prison, but often quoted as if written on the spot. He had published pamphlets in prison in 1828 under the title "Sketch of a Proposal for Colonising Australia", which received a lot of interest. Wakefield's utopian theorising on systematic colonial settlement policy in the early-19th century centred on economic considerations, but with a view to preserving class distinctions;

The National Colonization Society (also spelt National Colonisation Society) was created in 1830 in order to advocate for the type of "systematic colonisation" set out in Letter from Sydney, based on three principles: careful selection of emigrants; the concentration of settlers; and the sale of land at a fixed, uniform, "sufficient price", to provide funding for new settlers. Wakefield was a founder member, and Robert Gouger was elected (or appointed) inaugural secretary of the society, although he was later to fall out with Wakefield when they disagreed on the price that should be charged for land. Members over time included Robert Rintoul (editor of The Spectator), Charles Buller, John Stuart Mill, Sir William Molesworth, W. W. Whitmore, and Sir William Hutt. Jeremy Bentham supported the ideas of the society. Colonel Robert Torrens and Robert Wilmot-Horton were on the committee of the society. The society published The Outline of a Plan of a Colony, later expanded and elaborated upon by Wakefield.

In 1831, Lord Howick, Under-Secretary of the Colonial Office was won over by the idea of selling land at a fixed, uniform price, and based his "Ripon Regulations" on this principle, issued in February 1831, which abolished free land grants, replacing them with and land sales at public auction, set at a minimum price of five shillings per acre in the colony of New South Wales.

After his Letter from Sydney in 1829, Wakefield's name became associated with other "scientific theories" of colonisation similar to his. People who accepted these ideas were usually on the side of the colonists, and were called "systematic colonisers," or (more commonly) "colonial reformers" and "radical imperialists," to highlight their Radical Whig political roots.

After his release Wakefield briefly turned his attention to social questions at home, and produced a tract on the Punishment of Death (1831), with a graphic picture of the condemned sermon in Newgate, and another on the rural districts, with an equally powerful exhibition of the degraded condition of the agricultural labourer. He soon, however, became entirely engrossed with colonial affairs.

=== South Australia ===
In 1831, having impressed John Stuart Mill, Robert Torrens and other leading economists with the value of his ideas, Wakefield became involved in various schemes to promote the colonisation of South Australia. He believed that many of the social problems in Britain were caused by overpopulation, and he saw emigration to the colonies as a useful safety valve. He set out to design a colonisation scheme with a workable combination of labourers, artisans and capital. The scheme was to be financed by the sale of land to the capitalists who would thereby support the other classes of emigrants.

It took several attempts before the Province of South Australia was established. Although initially, Wakefield was a driving force, as it came closer to fruition, he was allowed less and less influence, with ally-turned-rival Robert Gouger eventually controlling execution of the scheme.

=== America ===
However, he did not lose interest in colonisation as a tool for social engineering. In 1833 he published anonymously England and America, a work primarily intended to develop his own colonial theory, which is done in the appendix entitled "The Art of Colonization." The body of the work contains many new ideas, some of them reaching apparently extreme conclusions. It contains the distinct proposal that the transport of letters should be wholly free, and the prediction that, under given circumstances, the Americans would raise "cheaper corn than has ever yet been raised".

=== New Zealand Association ===
Soon, a new project was under way, the New Zealand Association. In 1837 the Colonial Office gave the New Zealand Association a charter to promote settlement in New Zealand. However, they attached conditions that were unacceptable to the members of the Association. After considerable discussion, interest in the project waned. Wakefield was undoubtedly one of the most influential voices in the Association, but he discovered another interest, Canada.

=== Canada – 1838 ===
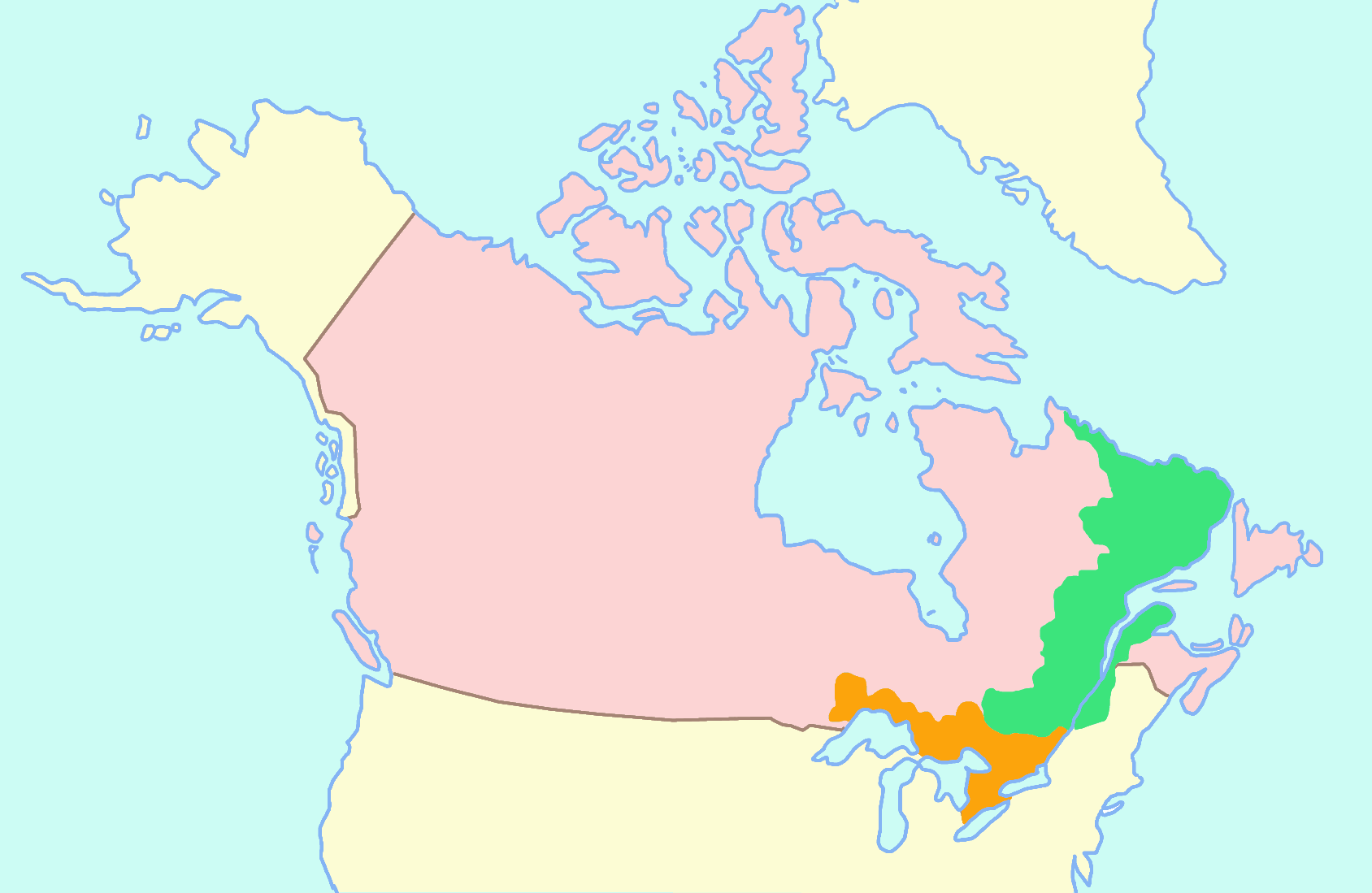
Map of Lower Canada (green) and Upper Canada (orange)

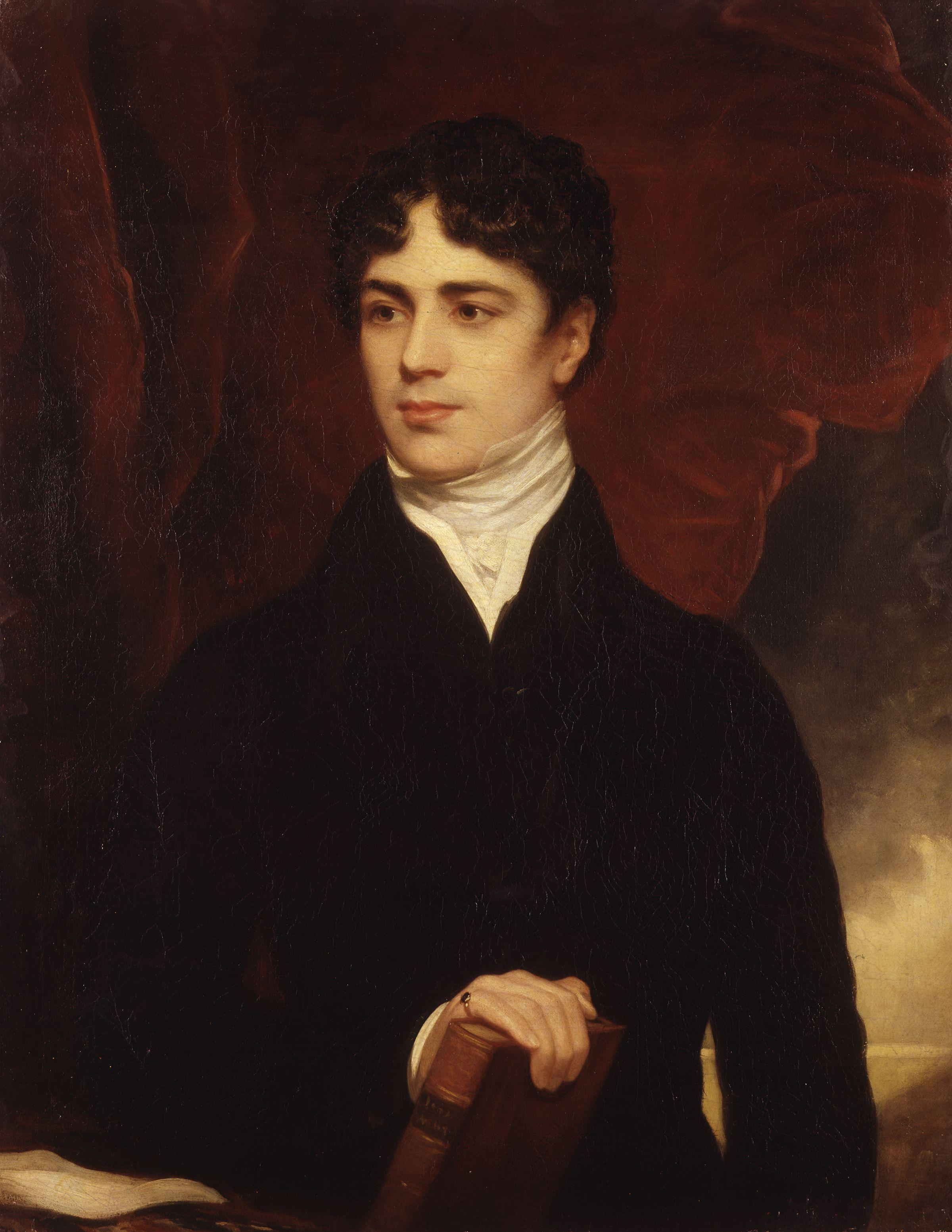
Lord Durham, Governor General of British North America

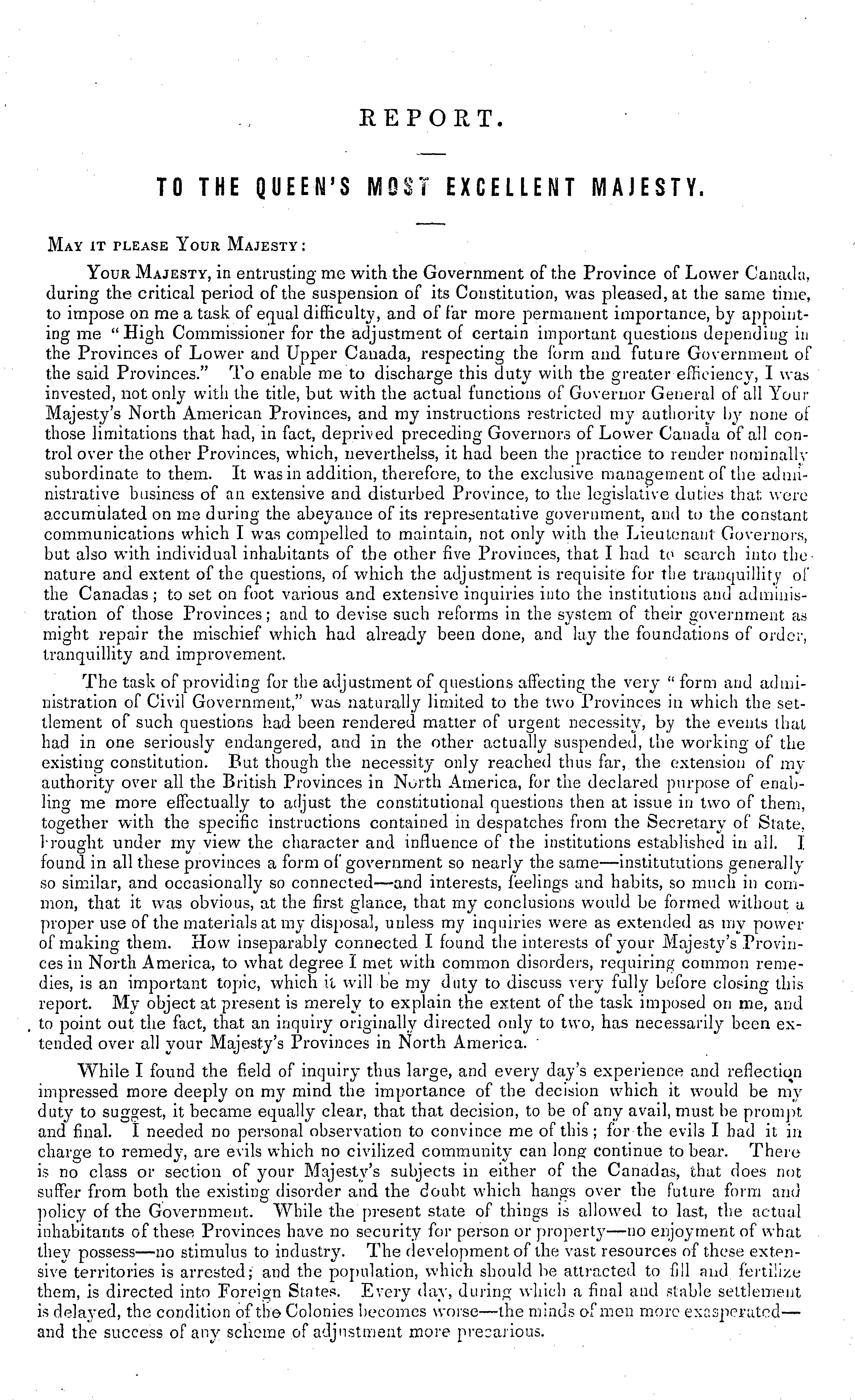
Lord Durham's Report

In 1837, rebellions took place in both Lower Canada and Upper Canada. Colonial governments in both provinces suppressed the rebellions but did not resolve the underlying political discontent. In January 1838, the government of Lord Melbourne appointed Lord Durham as Governor General of all of British North America, to inquire into the causes of the rebellions and to make recommendations to settle the disputes. Durham was authorised to appoint his own advisors, and chose Wakefield as one of them. Durham knew Wakefield through Wakefield's plans for colonisation of New Zealand. He was a member of the New Zealand Association, set up by Wakefield ten years earlier to encourage emigration to New Zealand.

Durham was only prepared to accept the task if Wakefield accompanied him as Commissioner of Crown Lands. However, they both knew that Wakefield would be unacceptable to the British government, so Durham planned to announce the appointment only after he had reached Canada. Wakefield and his son, Edward Jerningham Wakefield, sailed secretly for Canada in April 1838. Before they arrived, word had leaked out, and London forbade his appointment. Durham appointed one of his other advisors, Charles Buller, as Commissioner, but he kept Wakefield as an unofficial unpaid representative, advisor and negotiator. Durham thus effectively gave Wakefield the same powers he would have had if he had been appointed but without being paid.

Wakefield's main task was analysis of the issue of public lands and the relationship of land to settlement. He prepared a detailed report on public lands. He said settlement could be encouraged by selling Crown lands at higher prices than had been the case up to then. This would attract immigrants with capital. This approach had been tried without much success in Upper Canada some years before. Wakefield's report on public lands became Appendix B to the Durham Report. No attempt was made to implement his policy proposals.

Durham met extensively with local political leaders, but at one point, Wakefield met with one of the reformers from Lower Canada, Louis-Hippolyte LaFontaine. He also travelled to Saratoga Springs, New York, in an unsuccessful attempt to meet with the main leader of the Patriote movement, Louis-Joseph Papineau, who had fled to the United States during the Rebellion. It is not clear if Wakefield was acting on his own initiative in these conversations, or on secret instructions from Durham. He later said he was acting on his own, but LaFontaine had the clear impression he was acting for Durham. During his conversation with LaFontaine, Wakefield had tried to persuade him to publicly approve Durham's policy concerning the exiles to Bermuda, and the death penalty for Patriotes still in the United States. LaFontaine refused, seeing in it his "suicide politique". Wakefield later said he was not impressed by LaFontaine, writing that he and the other Patriote leaders were "profoundly ignorant of their own position and thoroughly devoid of judgment..."

Durham abruptly resigned his post as Governor General in the fall of 1838. He had attempted to deal with those who had been caught in arms by pardoning the rank and file, exiling eight of the leaders to Bermuda, and threatening Patriotes in exile in the United States with death if they returned to Lower Canada. In London, Lord Brougham, former Lord Chancellor, vigorously criticised these actions, arguing that Durham had no legal authority to exile the leaders without trial, nor to threaten the exiles with death. Melbourne's government disallowed Durham's ordinance. Durham said he took this as showing a lack of confidence in him. He and Wakefield left Lower Canada shortly before the second outbreak of the Rebellion in November 1838.

In Britain, Durham went into seclusion while he wrote his report on the causes of the rebellions and his recommendations for reforms to prevent further unrest in the two colonies: Report on the Affairs of British North America. Wakefield and Buller are not mentioned in the report, but it seems likely that the report was written cooperatively by the three men, although some historians have asserted the primary author was Wakefield, while others have said it was Buller. (Lord Brougham, still a critic of Durham, commented that "Wakefield thought it, Buller wrote it, Durham signed it.") The report recommended that the two colonies be united under a single government, but with the key recommendation that the government be drawn from the groups which had a majority in the Assembly: the basic principle of responsible government. Durham's report was one of the first documents to outline this principle in detail.

Durham provided the proofs of the report to Cabinet on 31 January 1839, four days before he presented it to the Colonial Office. In the interval, the Times began publishing extracts from the report. It is not clear how the Times obtained the report, but it is generally accepted that Durham likely leaked parts of his report to prevent the government from burying his recommendation for responsible government. Durham's report was formally laid before Parliament on 11 February 1839. Eventually the report, and its conclusions, became a blueprint for development of British colonial policy in Canada and elsewhere.

=== The New Zealand Company ===
The defunct New Zealand Association reformed itself as the New Zealand Company in June 1838. By the end of the year they had purchased a ship, the Tory. Early in 1839 they discovered that although they now complied with the conditions the government had laid down for the old New Zealand Association, it was not prepared to honour its promises. Furthermore, it was actively considering making New Zealand a British Colony in which case land sales would become a government monopoly.

At a meeting in March 1839, Wakefield was invited to become the director of the New Zealand Company. His philosophy was the same as when he planned his elopements: "Possess yourself of the Soil and you are Secure."

It was decided that the Tory would sail for New Zealand as soon as possible. His brother William was appointed the leader of the expedition with his son Jerningham as his nominal secretary. They had some difficulty finding a suitable captain for the Tory, but then found Edward Main Chaffers who had been sailing master on HMS Beagle during Fitzroy's circumnavigation. Dr. Ernst Dieffenbach was appointed as scientific officer, and Charles Heaphy as a draughtsman. The Tory left London on 5 May and called at Plymouth to complete the fitting out. Fearing a last-minute attempt by the government to prevent her sailing, Wakefield hastened down to Plymouth and advised their immediate departure. The Tory finally quit English shores on 12 May 1839 and reached New Zealand 96 days later.

Wakefield did not sail with the colonists, and many years were to pass before he saw New Zealand. He may have recognised that he did not have the patience, the skills or the talents needed on a frontier. His talents lay in visualising dramatic plans and grandiose schemes, ignoring the details, and then persuading other people to get involved. He was a salesman, a propagandist and a politician, secretly inspiring and guiding many parliamentary committees on colonial subjects, especially on the abolition of penal transportation.

By the end of 1839, he had dispatched eight more ships to New Zealand, before he even knew of the success of the Tory expedition led by his brother William. He then recruited another brother, Arthur, to lead another expedition, this time to settle in the Nelson area at the top of the South Island. Charles Torlesse, the 16-year-old son of his elder sister Catherine, and Rev. Charles Martin Torlesse, rector of Stoke-by-Nayland in Suffolk, sailed with Arthur as a trainee surveyor. By now William's daughter, Emily, and his ward, Leocadia, were already in New Zealand. Two more of his brothers also went to New Zealand later, along with numerous nieces and nephews.

=== Canada (1841–1843) ===
While active with the New Zealand Company, Wakefield maintained his interest in Canadian affairs. He returned briefly in 1841, a year after the British government had brought the Union Act, 1840 into force. The government had implemented only some of Durham's recommendations. The Act of Union merged Lower Canada and Upper Canada into a single Province of Canada, creating a bicameral parliament with an elected Legislative Assembly and an appointed Legislative Council. The Act did not implement responsible government—the Governor General retained considerable control over the government.

Wakefield was involved with the North American Colonial Association of Ireland. At his instigation, the Association purchased a large estate just outside Montreal, the seigneury of Villechauve, where it wanted to establish another colonial settlement. The seigneury, also known as Beauharnois, had been owned by Edward Ellice, a wealthy merchant and former British Cabinet minister, who had substantial business interests in British North America. (Ellice's son, also named Edward Ellice, had been Durham's private secretary. While in Lower Canada, he and his wife, Katherine Ellice, had been taken prisoner by Patriotes at the seigneury during the Battle of Beauharnois in November 1838.) In addition to being site for proposed settlements, the seigneury was valuable because it was close to the location for a proposed canal, that would allow travellers to avoid a stretch of rapids on the River St. Lawrence. The initial arrangement for purchase had been made in 1839, and in 1841 Wakefield made a brief trip to Canada to gain support for the canal proposal. He met with the Governor General, Lord Sydenham, who was interested in the proposal but wary of Wakefield's involvement. Sydenham died in a riding accident in September 1841 before any decision was made.

Wakefield returned to Canada in January 1842 to lobby the new governor, Sir Charles Bagot, and stayed for almost a year. Although there was strong opposition in the Assembly to the canal proposal, a major loan guarantee from the British government ensured that funds could be obtained. In June 1842 the Executive Council approved the Beauharnois route, and construction began. As part of his lobbying, Wakefield positioned himself as a champion of French-Canadian interests, sending a series of letters to the Colonial Gazette in London, calling for greater French-Canadian involvement in the government of the province. He cultivated two significant Patriote leaders who had been imprisoned during the Rebellion, Denis-Benjamin Viger and Jean-Joseph Girouard. He also appeared to have a source within Governor Bagot's office: in one letter to the Colonial Gazette, he correctly predicted that Bagot would appoint LaFontaine to the Executive Council within a month, a significant political advance for French-Canadians, and a major shift in imperial policy. Rumours circulated that Wakefield himself was behind Bagot's policy, a claim denied by Bagot, who stated that he had only met Wakefield two or three times.

At the end of the parliamentary session in October 1842, John William Dunscomb, the member of the Legislative Assembly for the Beauharnois district, resigned his seat to take a position in Montreal. Wakefield ran for election in Beauharnois in November 1842, campaigning as a supporter of LaFontaine. He was elected to the Legislative Assembly. After being elected, he returned to Britain for a short time.

Wakefield returned to Canada in September 1843 for the parliamentary session. He initially aligned himself with the French-Canadian Group under LaFontaine's leadership, but part-way through the session he left them. He introduced a bill to make the North American Colonial Association of Ireland a mortgage and trust company, with an accompanying colonisation plan. The French-Canadian Group did not support his proposals, so he left them and began to support the new Governor General, Sir Charles Metcalfe. (Bagot had died earlier in the year.)

In November, a major political crisis arose in the parliament. LaFontaine and colleague Robert Baldwin had taken office on the principle of responsible government and got into a dispute with Metcalfe after Metcalfe appointed government officials without consulting the Executive Council. LaFontaine, Baldwin, and all but one of the members of the Executive Council resigned, arguing that Metcalfe's actions were inconsistent with the principle of responsible government. A major debate in the Assembly over the issue resulted in the passage of a motion condemning Governor Metcalfe for his actions. Wakefield defended Metcalfe, relying on a narrow interpretation of the principle of responsible government. Wakefield insinuated that the real reason LaFontaine and Baldwin had resigned was that they feared defeat on a taxation bill they had introduced. He voted against the motion and in support of Metcalfe, along with Viger and some other members who left the French-Canadian Group on the issue. Following the resignations, Wakefield appeared to be giving advice to Metcalfe, with some saying that he was the real governor. His motivation appears to have been finding support for the schemes he had earlier put forward to develop the Beauharnois area for the Colonial Association.

Metcalfe prorogued the Assembly after the passage of the motion. Finding it difficult to assemble a new ministry, he did not recall the Assembly, instead dissolving it for a general election in 1844. Wakefield returned to Britain after the 1843 session, and did not stand for re-election.

In 1844, he wrote two pieces recounting his experiences as a Canadian legislator and defending Metcalfe: a small book, "A View of Sir Charles Metcalfe's Government of Canada", and an article "Sir Charles Metcalfe in Canada", which appeared in Fisher's Colonial Magazine in July 1844. He described Metcalfe as very honest and fair and not at all a party man, which was contrary to expectations and surprising to elected legislators in Canada.

That was the end of his involvement in Canadian affairs, apart from being paid about £20,000 by the Association for his work in Canada.

== England and illness (1844–1852) ==
Wakefield returned to England in early 1844 to find the New Zealand Company under serious attack from the Colonial Office. He threw himself into the campaign to save his project. In August 1844 he had a stroke, followed in later months by several other minor strokes, and he had to retire. There is also a possibility that his mental health was not too sound in the succeeding months. His son Jerningham returned from New Zealand about this time and cared for him. In August 1845 he went to France to recuperate and to give himself a break from New Zealand affairs. It did not serve his purpose and he returned to London two months later in a semi-invalid state. During his convalescence he wrote his book A View of the Art of Colonization, in the form of letters between a "Statesman" and a "Colonist".

By January 1846 Wakefield was back to his scheming. By now Gladstone was Colonial Secretary. Wakefield approached him early in the New Year with a fairly radical plan that both the Government and the New Zealand Company should withdraw from New Zealand affairs and the colony should become self-governing. While it might have been a good idea, Wakefield wanted it accepted immediately, and became at first heated and then distressed when some months later, it was still being considered.

In August 1846, he had another, potentially fatal stroke. His friend, Charles Buller, took up the negotiations. In May 1847 the British Government agreed to take over the debts of the New Zealand Company and to buy out their interests in the Colony. The directors readily accepted the offer. Wakefield found he was powerless and unable to influence the decision, which did not please him.

Without notice, his youngest brother Felix Wakefield, who had been in Tasmania since the early 1830s, reappeared in England accompanied by eight of his children, having abandoned his wife and youngest child in Australia. Felix had no money and no prospects and was unable to provide for his family. Wakefield found him somewhere to live and farmed out the children among relatives, but it was another year before his health was strong enough to take over the role of surrogate father, Felix being apparently unable to do anything for his family.

Meanwhile, Wakefield was getting involved in a new scheme. He was working with John Robert Godley to promote a new settlement in New Zealand, this one to be sponsored by the Church of England. This plan matured to become the Canterbury Settlement. The first ship sailed from England in December 1849 with Godley in command of the expedition. Jerningham Wakefield also sailed with them, his health and finances ruined by his dissipated lifestyle in London. The first immigrant ships bound for Canterbury sailed from Plymouth in September 1850, and others followed.

In the same year, Wakefield co-founded the Colonial Reform Society with Charles Adderley, a landowner and member of parliament for North Staffordshire.

Felix was causing problems back in Britain and causing Wakefield a great deal of grief. Felix decided that settlement in New Zealand was the solution to all his problems. Wakefield reluctantly sponsored his passage to Canterbury, where Felix was allocated 100 acres (0.40 km^{2}) (40 hectares) of land near Sumner. He and six of his children arrived in Lyttelton in November 1851. A short time later one of the other settlers described him as "the worst man we have in Canterbury".

During 1851 and 1852 Wakefield continued to work for the Canterbury Association and also worked towards making New Zealand a self-governing colony. The New Zealand Constitution Act was passed on 30 June 1852. There was general satisfaction among New Zealanders about this, although they were less happy to discover that the new government was to be saddled with the remaining debts of the defunct New Zealand Company.

== Move to New Zealand (1853) ==
Wakefield now decided that he had achieved everything he could in England; it was time to see the colony he felt he had created. He sailed from Plymouth in September 1852, knowing he would never return. His sister Catherine and her son Charley came to see him off. Then, at the last minute, his father appeared. Edward Wakefield was now 78 years old; he and Wakefield had not spoken since the Ellen Turner abduction 26 years before. They were reconciled, and the elder Edward died two years later.

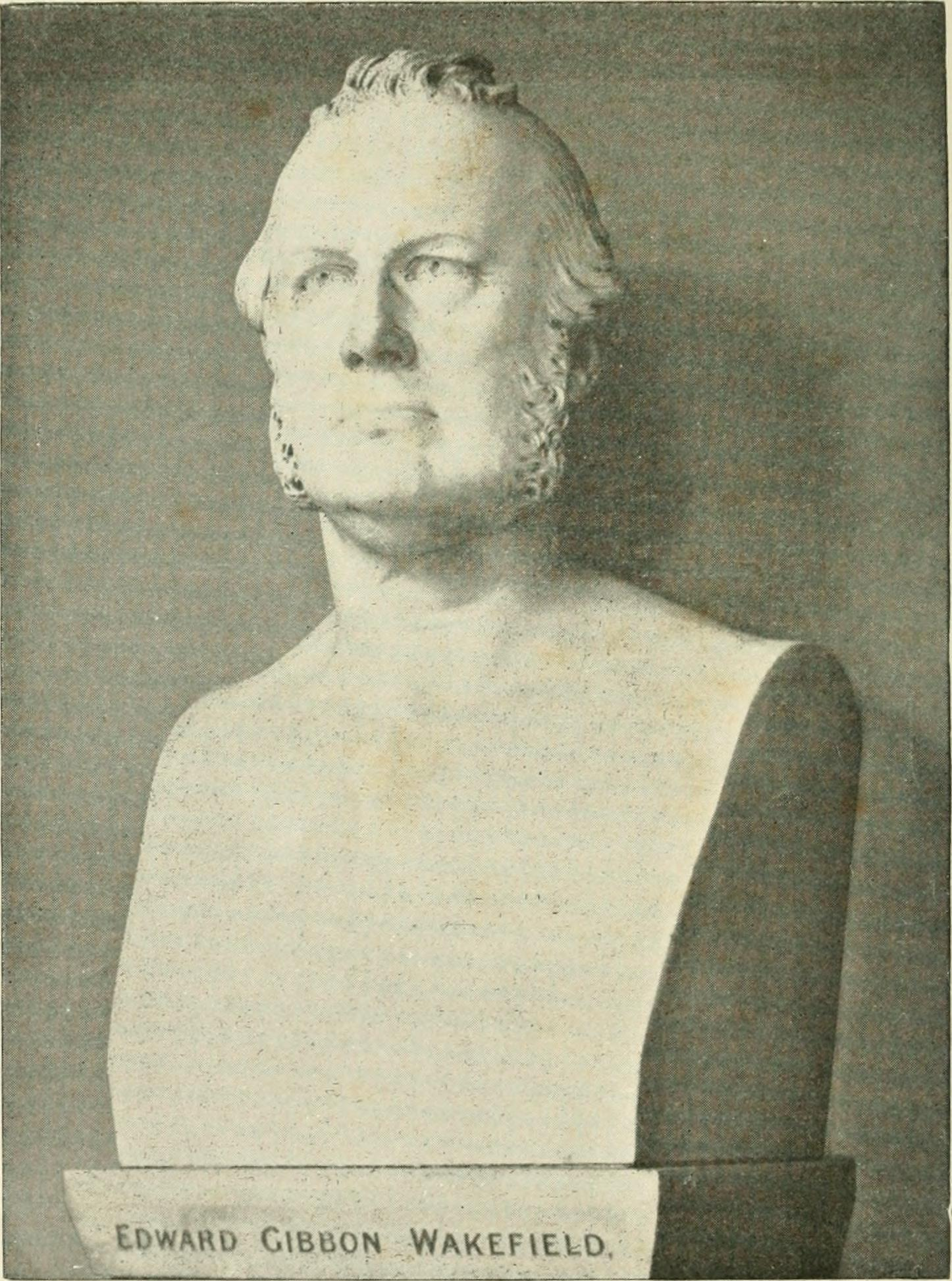
A bust of Wakefield from the 1897 book New Zealand rulers and statesmen from 1840 to 1897

The ship arrived at Port Lyttelton on 2 February 1853. Wakefield had travelled with Henry Sewell who had been deputy chairman and full-time manager of the Canterbury Association. It seems likely that he expected to be welcomed as a founding father of the colony; to be feted and immediately asked to assume the leadership of colony. However, colonisation had inevitably changed the perspectives of the people of Canterbury. Many of them felt they had been let down and cheated by the Association, and the two arrivals were firmly linked in their minds with the broken promises and disappointments of the Association.

James Edward FitzGerald, who was one of the leaders of Canterbury, and who was elected as Superintendent of the Canterbury Province a few months later (in July 1853), declined to meet with Wakefield for some days and certainly was unwilling to relinquish control.

Within a very short time Wakefield was completely disenchanted with Canterbury. He claimed the citizens were far too parochial in their outlook; they were far more concerned with domestic issues rather than national politics. Clearly they were not worthy of Edward Gibbon Wakefield and after only one month he left Canterbury and sailed for Wellington.

Wellington was in political ferment. Governor George Grey had proclaimed self-government for New Zealand, but the political structure was less "self-government" than was described in the New Zealand Constitution Act of the year before. George Grey was unscrupulous, as was Wakefield, and his ideas on what was good for New Zealand were different from Wakefield's.

When they arrived in Wellington, Wakefield declined to go ashore unless he was going to be properly received by the governor. Grey left town. Sewell went ashore and met with various dignitaries including Daniel Bell Wakefield, who had been in Wellington for some years practising law and was attorney general of the province. He also got an address of welcome for Wakefield, written by Isaac Featherston and signed by many citizens.

Almost as soon as he landed, Wakefield took issue with George Grey on his policy on land sales. Grey was in favour of selling land very cheaply to encourage the flow of settlers. Wakefield called for the price of land to be high so that the growth of the colony could be financed by land sales; it was a fundamental tenet of his colonial theory. He and Sewell applied for an injunction to prevent the Commissioner of Crown Lands selling any further lands under Governor Grey's regulations. The Crown Commissioner was Wakefield's second cousin and former New Zealand Company employee, Francis Dillon Bell.

Within a month of arriving in Wellington, Wakefield began a campaign in London to have Grey recalled, not knowing he had already applied to leave the colony. Meanwhile, Grey was in control. He questioned Wakefield's integrity, always an easy target. He focussed on the generous fees that had been paid to Wakefield as a director of the New Zealand Company at a time when it was reneging on its debts in New Zealand. This reminded the people of Wellington that they had been let down by the company and their angry feelings. Wakefield cleared himself of the actual charges, but he lost prestige.

=== Member of Parliament ===
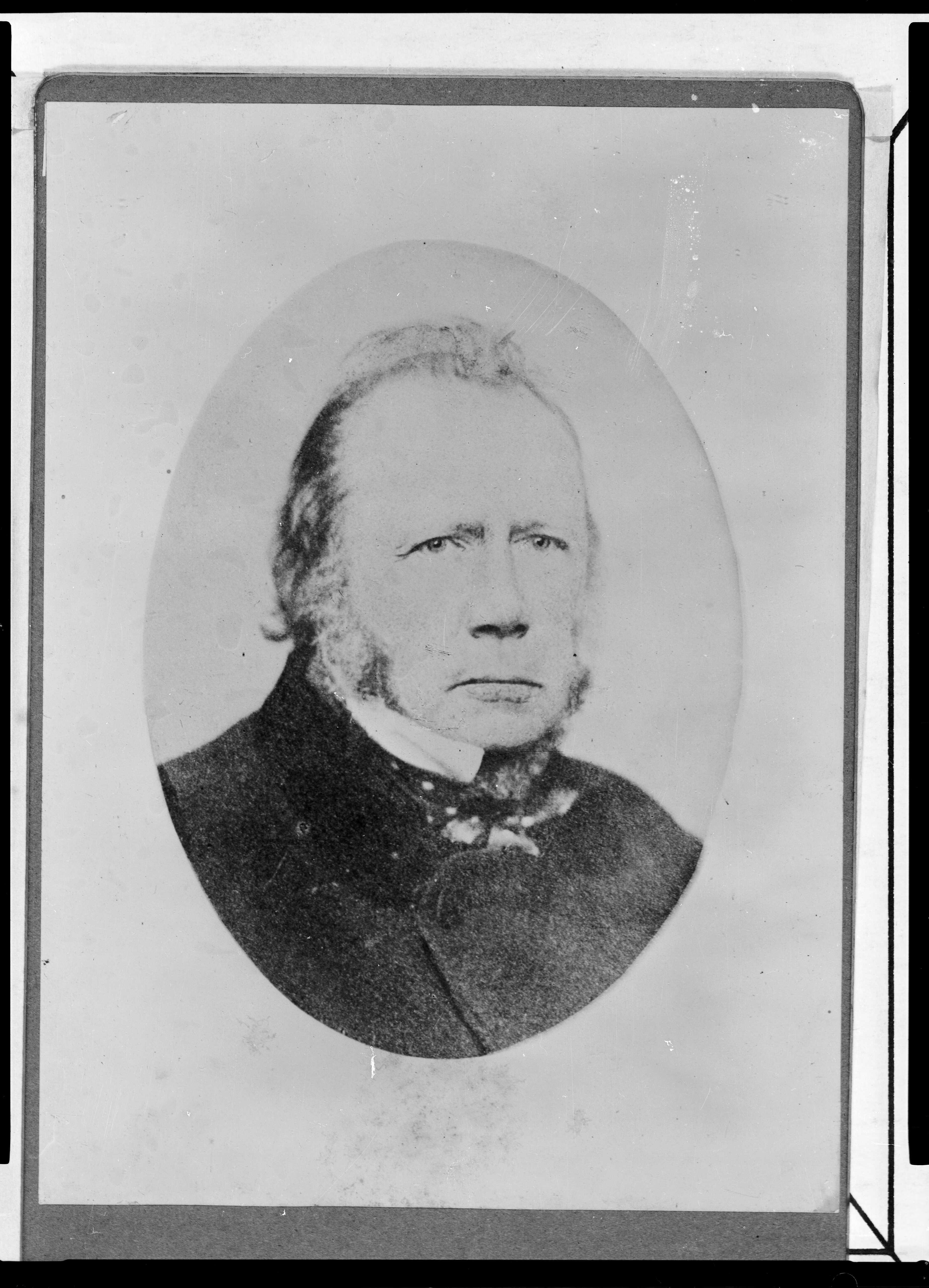
Wakefield in around 1850–1860

New Zealand Parliament
Years	Term	Electorate	Party
1853–1855	1st	Hutt	Independent

Elections for the Wellington Provincial Council and General Assembly, the national parliament, were held in August 1853. Wakefield stood for the Hutt electorate, and to the surprise of some, and the disappointment of others, he was elected to both the Provincial Council and the General Assembly.

The first sitting of the Provincial Assembly was in October 1853. Wakefield was not only the senior member but also clearly the most experienced politically. However, the Assembly was controlled by the Constitutional Party led by Dr. Isaac Featherston and they had been heavily involved in the recent criticism of his integrity. Working in opposition, Wakefield probably made certain that the Provincial Assembly became a working democracy rather than a Constitutional Party oligarchy. His wide knowledge of parliamentary law and custom made certain that the body of the assembly could not be ignored by the ruling party.

Early in 1854 the town of Wellington held a Founders' Festival. Three hundred people attended including sixty Māori and all the Wakefields. The principal toast of the evening was to: "The original founders of the Colony and Mr. Edward Gibbon Wakefield". Whatever the vicissitudes of the last few months, it confirmed Wakefield as one of the leading political figures of colony, possibly the only one with stature to take on Governor Grey.

==== Responsible government conflict ====
Grey was gone and Colonel Robert Wynyard was acting as Governor when Wynyard opened the 1st New Zealand Parliament on 27 May 1854. Wakefield and James Fitzgerald each immediately began manoeuvering for positions of influence, with Wakefield moving a motion for Parliament to appoint its own responsible governments (Ministers of the Crown). Wakefield took a position supporting Wynyard, while FitzGerald took an opposite tack. The dispute over responsible government dragged on. As a compromise, on 7 June, Wynyard appointed James FitzGerald to the Executive Council. Wakefield was not asked to form a part of the ministry.

By July 1854 FitzGerald was in serious conflict with Wynyard. FitzGerald's Executive Council (cabinet) resigned on 2 August 1854. Wakefield was summoned to form a government; he refused to do so. He said instead that he would advise Wynyard, so long as he acted on his advice alone. In effect, he sought to turn Wynyard into his own puppet. He did not have a majority of supporters in the house, and the assembly was paralysed. Wynyard prorogued parliament on 17 August, but he had to recall it again by the end of the month when he needed money to run the country. The new ministry, headed by Thomas Forsaith, composed mainly of Wakefield's supporters and it was soon clear that he was the de facto head of the ministry. However, they failed to survive an early vote of no confidence, and New Zealand's second government collapsed on 2 September 1854. In the remaining two weeks of the Assembly's life they managed to pass some useful legislation before they were dismissed and new elections called.

Wakefield held two election meetings for his constituents in the Hutt Valley, which were well received. A third meeting was scheduled but never happened. On the night of 5 December 1855, Wakefield fell ill with rheumatic fever and neuralgia. He retired to his house in Wellington. He retired from the Hutt seat on 15 September 1855 and retired from all political activity, making no more public appearances. He lived for another seven years, but his political life was over.

== Death and legacy ==
In 1839 John Hill named the Wakefield River, a river north of Adelaide in the new colony of South Australia, after Wakefield, which later led to the naming of Port Wakefield. A sculpture of Wakefield was unveiled at the Auckland High Court in 1866, as a part of a series of relief sculptures created by Anton Teutenberg.

Wakefield is mentioned and criticised in Chapter 33 of Karl Marx's Das Kapital (Volume 1) and also in Henry George's How to Help the Unemployed.

His colonization plan for Australia and experiences in Canada were discussed in the 1915 book The colonization of Australia (1829–42); the Wakefield experiment in empire building, by Richard Charles Mills.

Wakefield died on 16 May 1862 in Wellington, New Zealand.

== Selected publications ==
- Facts Relating to the Punishment of Death in the Metropolis by Edward Gibbon Wakefield, James Ridgway, 1831.
- A View of the Art of Colonization by Edward Gibbon Wakefield, 1849.

New Zealand Parliament
New constituency	Member of Parliament for Hutt; 1853–1855; Served alongside: Alfred Ludlam	Succeeded by Dillon Bell
