= Berthierville =

- City
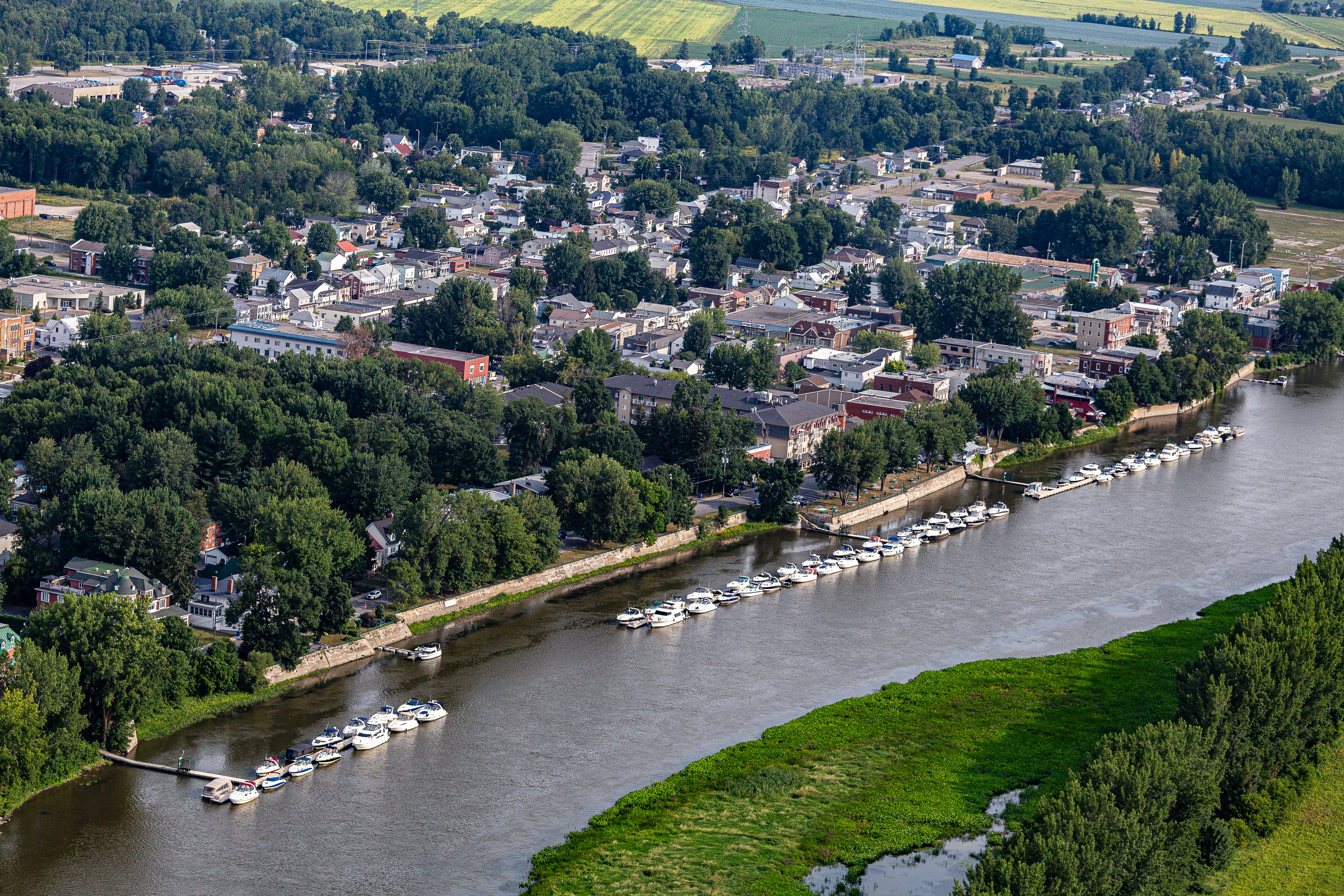

- Coat of arms

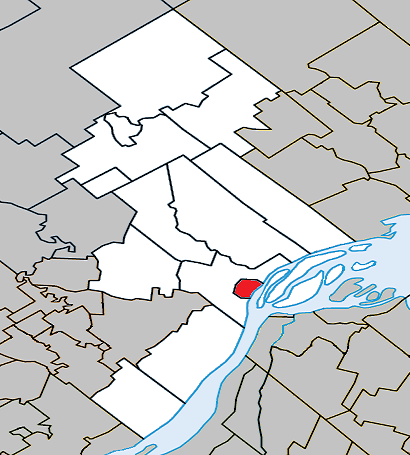
- Location within D'Autray RCM

- Location in central Quebec
- Coordinates: 46°05′N 73°11′W
- Country: Canada
- Province: Quebec
- Region: Lanaudière
- RCM: D'Autray
- Constituted: April 14, 1852

Government
  - Mayor: Pierre Lahaie
  - Federal riding: Berthier—Maskinongé
  - Prov. riding: Berthier

Area
  - Total: 7.22 km^{2} (2.79 sq mi)
  - Land: 6.77 km^{2} (2.61 sq mi)

Population (2021)
  - Total: 4,386
  - Density: 647/km^{2} (1,680/sq mi)
  - Change 2016-21: ▲4.7%
  - Dwellings: 2,225
- Time zone: UTC−5 (EST)
  - Summer (DST): UTC−4 (EDT)
- Postal code(s): J0K
- Area codes: 450 and 579
- Highways A-40: R-138; R-158
- Website: www.ville.berthierville.qc.ca

Berthierville (/ˈbɛərtjeɪvɪl/; French pronunciation: [bɛʁtjevil]; also called Berthier-en-haut, and legally called Berthier before 1942) is a town located between Montreal and Trois-Rivières on the north shore of the St. Lawrence River in Quebec, Canada. Berthierville is the seat of D'Autray Regional County Municipality, and is served by Autoroute 40, and is the junction of Routes 138 and 158. The town is listed as a Village rélais. It is surrounded by the parish municipality of Sainte-Geneviève-de-Berthier.

The Marie Reine du Canada Pilgrimage column stops at the church of Sainte-Geneviève de Berthierville for Mass on the first day of its three-day walk from Lanoraie to Cap-de-la-Madeleine.

== History ==
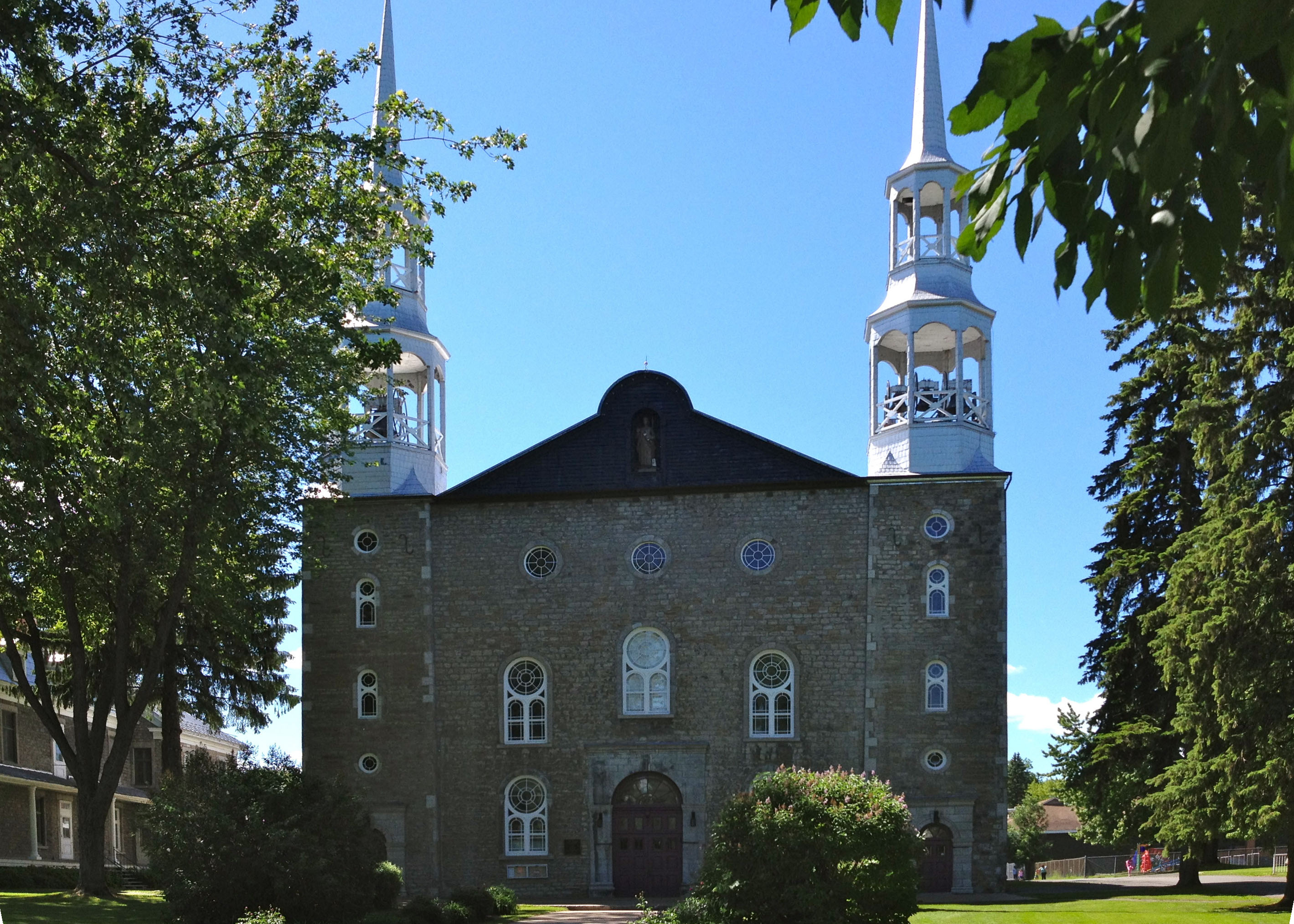
Sainte-Geneviève de Berthierville church, opened 22 August 1787.

In 1672, the area was granted as a seignory by Jean Talon, intendant of New France, to Hugues Randin, who in turn sold it to Alexandre Berthier the following year. This seignory became known as Berthier-en-Haut (Upper Berthier) to distinguish it from another seignory that Berthier owned in the Bellechasse region.

In 1845, the Municipality of Berthier-en-Haut was formed, but abolished in 1847. It was reestablished as the Village Municipality of Berthier in 1852, and changed status to ville in 1865. In 1942, it was renamed to Berthierville.

In 1962, Berthierville annexed part of Sainte-Geneviève-de-Berthier.

== Demographics ==
In the 2021 Census of Population conducted by Statistics Canada, Berthierville had a population of 4,386 living in 2,166 of its 2,225 total private dwellings, a change of 4.7% from its 2016 population of 4,189. With a land area of 6.77 km^{2} (2.61 sq mi), it had a population density of 647.9/km^{2} (1,677.9/sq mi) in 2021.

Historical census populations – Berthierville

Year	Pop.	±%
1871	1,433	—
1881	2,156	+50.5%
1891	1,537	−28.7%
1901	1,364	−11.3%
1911	1,335	−2.1%
1921	2,193	+64.3%
1931	2,431	+10.9%
1941	2,634	+8.4%

Year	Pop.	±%
1951	3,325	+26.2%
1956	3,504	+5.4%
1961	3,708	+5.8%
1966	3,943	+6.3%
1971	4,080	+3.5%
1976	4,249	+4.1%
1981	4,049	−4.7%
1986	3,805	−6.0%

Year	Pop.	±%
1991	3,854	+1.3%
1996	3,952	+2.5%
2001	3,939	−0.3%
2006	4,007	+1.7%
2011	4,091	+2.1%
2016	4,189	+2.4%
2021	4,386	+4.7%

Population counts are not adjusted for boundary changes.
Source: Statistics Canada

Mother tongue (2021):

- English as first language: 0.8%
- French as first language: 95.5%
- English and French as first languages: 0.8%
- Other as first language: 2.5%

== Education ==
Centre de services scolaire des Samares, formerly the Commission scolaire des Samares, operates francophone public schools, including:

- École secondaire Pierre-de-Lestage
- École du Chemin-du-Roy
  - pavillon maternelle Sainte-Geneviève
  - pavillon Sainte-Geneviève
  - pavillon Saint-Joseph
- École de l'Île Saint-Ignace (currently in Berthierville)

The Sir Wilfrid Laurier School Board operates anglophone public schools, including:

- Joliette Elementary School in Saint-Charles-Borromée
- Joliette High School in Joliette

== Notable people ==
- Alexis St. Martin, gastrointestinal experimentation pioneer
- Gilles Villeneuve, Formula One race car driver
- Jacques Villeneuve, Formula 1 driver
- Jean-Baptiste Prat, businessman and banker
- Aristide Blais, Canadian Senator for Alberta
- Richard Landry, architect

== See also ==
- List of cities in Quebec
