= Richard Landry =

Canadian architect

- Born: 1957 (age 68–69); Berthierville, Québec, Canada
- Education: Université de Montréal; Københavns Universitet
- Occupation: Architect
- Known for: Founded Landry Design Group
- Children: 1
- Website: landrydesigngroup.com

Richard Landry (born 1957) is a Canadian architect. Known as the "King of the Megamansion," he has designed many private residences for corporate moguls and celebrities in Los Angeles County, California.

== Early life and education ==
Richard Landry grew up speaking French in Berthierville, Québec, and his father was a carpenter. At the age of twenty, he moved to Montréal to study architecture. He received a Bachelor of Architecture degree from the Université de Montréal, in Québec, Canada, and a Diploma in Architecture and Urban Design from Københavns Universitet, in Copenhagen, Denmark.

== Career ==
Landry started his career in Alberta, Canada. He moved to Los Angeles, California in 1984 because of a recession in Canada, and he was lured by the 1984 Summer Olympics. He initially worked for R. Duell & Associates, an architectural firm where he designed theme parks.

Landry founded his architectural firm, the Landry Design Group, in the 1987. Since then, he has designed over 500 private residences, including some for Michael Bolton, Wayne Gretzky and Rod Stewart. In 1995, he designed a residence for Kenny G in Seattle. Additionally, the rented mansion in Holmby Hills, Los Angeles where Michael Jackson died was also designed by Landry.

Landry designed the Villa del Lago in Malibu, California, a bluffside 23,000-square-foot (2,100 m^{2}) mansion with views of Lake Sherwood and the Santa Monica Mountains, which was selected by Robb Report as their Ultimate Home in 2013. He designed a 40,000-square-foot (3,700 m^{2}) , 28-bedroom mansion with footbridges between buildings in Los Angeles, California, which was originally the location of the private residence of Burt Bacharach. A 9,000-square-foot (840 m^{2}) Mediterranean Revival villa in the gated community of Mulholland Estates in the Beverly Hills Post Office was an older project designed by Landry Design Group and built in 2000. It was sold for US$5.200 million in 2011. Examples of his designs are a Modernist residence in Los Angeles, a Spanish-style home in Pacific Palisades, and another residence in Palos Verdes Estates, California.

Landry has been on the Architectural Digest's AD100 list four times since 2000. In 2004 he was presented with the prestigious "Stars of Design" award from the Pacific Design Center and in 2007 he became a part of the "Robb Report Recommended" list of best architects. In July 2013 Richard Landry's name appeared on the cover of Robb Report's special issue of Best of the Best celebrating the Leaders of Luxury.(registration required)

For four consecutive years (2010–2013) homes designed by Richard Landry and Landry Design Group were selected by Robb Report for its Ultimate Home.

Landry is a member of the American Institute of Architects (AIA) and is a licensed architect in the states of California, Colorado, Connecticut, Florida, Idaho, Illinois, New Jersey, New York, North Carolina and Washington. He is also certified by the National Council of Architectural Registration Boards (NCARB).

== Personal life ==
Landry resides in Malibu, California, with an additional chalet in Northern California and a house in his native Québec. He has a daughter named Samantha. He is gay and lives with his male partner, Christoper Drugan, since 2020.
