= John William Dunscomb =

Politician in Canada East, Province of Canada

Member of the Legislative Assembly of the Province of Canada for Beauharnois
- In office 1841–1842
- Preceded by: New position
- Succeeded by: Edward Gibbon Wakefield

Alderman, Montreal municipal council
- In office 1840–1841

Personal details
- Born: February 23, 1809 Bermuda
- Died: December 16, 1891 (aged 82) Quebec City, Quebec
- Party: Unionist; Government supporter
- Spouse: Caroline Birch Dumford
- Children: 10 daughters and 4 sons
- Parent: John Dunscomb (father)
- Occupation: Merchant

John William Dunscomb (February 23, 1809 – December 16, 1891) (Note: There is some uncertainty about the dates of his birth and death. The biography given by the National Assembly of Quebec states he was born before 1821, and died around 1875. The published family history gives precise dates of February 23, 1809 and December 16, 1891. Those dates are used here.) was a merchant and political figure in Canada East, Province of Canada (now Quebec). He represented Beauharnois in the Legislative Assembly of the Province of Canada from 1841 to 1842 as a Government supporter and supporter of the union of the two Canadas.

Dunscomb was born in 1809 in Bermuda, the son of John Dunscomb, but his business was based in Montreal, Lower Canada.

== Career ==
Dunscomb served on the municipal council for Montreal from 1840 to 1841, when he resigned from the council.

Following the rebellion in Lower Canada, and the similar rebellion in 1837 in Upper Canada (now Ontario), the British government decided to merge the two provinces into a single province, as recommended by Lord Durham in the Durham Report. The Union Act, 1840, passed by the British Parliament, abolished the two provinces and their separate parliaments, and created the Province of Canada, with a single parliament for the entire province, composed of an elected Legislative Assembly and an appointed Legislative Council. The Governor General retained a strong position in the government.

Dunscomb stood for election in first general election in 1841, for the riding of Beauharnois, and was elected to the Legislative Assembly of the new Parliament. He was a Government supporter, who favoured the union of Lower Canada and Upper Canada into a single province. He generally supported the British Governor-General, Lord Sydenham.

In the second session of the Parliament, held in 1842, there was a major re-organisation of the ministry, when the new Governor-General, Sir Charles Bagot, appointed two strong reformers to the Executive Council, Robert Baldwin from Canada West, and Louis-Hippolyte Lafontaine from Canada East. Dunscomb was a co-mover of a resolution, along with John Simpson, expressing satisfaction with the new Council. The resolution stated that: "it was absolutely necessary to invite that large portion of our fellow subjects who are of French origin to share in the government of this country." The motion passed, although heavily amended.

On July 15, 1842, Dunscomb was appointed Warden of Trinity House in Montreal. He resigned his seat in the Assembly on October 8, 1842.

He later served as customs collector at Quebec City and as Customs Commissioner for the Province of Canada. He was the author of Provincial Laws of the Customs and Canadian Custom House Guide, both published in 1844.

== Genealogy ==
John married Caroline Birch Dumford on April 26, 1840 at St. George's, in Hanover Square, London.

Over the next 23 years, the couple had a total of 14 children:

- Caroline Durnford Dunscomb (1841)
- Mary Falconer Dunscomb (1842)
- Godfrey Dunscomb (1844)
- Alice Maud Anderson Dunscomb (1845)
- Eleanor Grace Dunscomb (1848)
- Georgeiena Dunscomb (1850)
- Henry Black Crowdy Dunscomb (1853)
- Florence Dunscomb (1854)
- Louisa Jane Victoria Dunscomb (1856)
- John Arthur Seward Dunscomb (1857)
- Christine Margaret Dunscomb (~1861)
- Anna Euretta Dunscomb (1861)
- William George Barnstorff Dunscomb (1862)
- Margaret Isabelle H. Dunscomb (1863)

Dunscomb died in Quebec City at the age of 82. He is buried at the Mount Hermon Cemetery in Quebec.

== See also ==
- 1st Parliament of the Province of Canada
