= Norbert Dumas =

Norbert Dumas (October 22, 1812 – April 19, 1869) was a lawyer and political figure in Canada East. He represented Leinster in the Legislative Assembly of the Province of Canada from 1848 to 1851.

He was born in Terrebonne, the son of Antoine Dumas and Marie-Rose Roy, was admitted to the Lower Canada bar in 1834 and set up practice in Montreal. In 1844, he married Magdeleine-Émilie-Alphonsine, the daughter of Joseph Roy. Dumas did not run for reelection to the assembly in 1851. In 1854, he was named Queen's Counsel. He died in Montreal at the age of 56.
