= Ovide Le Blanc =

Ovide Le Blanc (1801–1870) was a notary and political figure in Quebec. He represented Beauharnois in the Legislative Assembly of the Province of Canada from 1851 to 1854.

He was born in Champlain, Quebec, the son of Étienne Le Blanc and Josette Richerville, and grew up in Trois-Rivières. Le Blanc apprenticed as a notary at Quebec City and received his commission to practice in 1822. He practised in Trois-Rivières, Beauharnois, Montreal and Portage-du-Fort. He served as lieutenant in the militia. Le Blanc was an unsuccessful candidate for a seat in the legislative assembly in 1844. He was unsuccessful when he ran for reelection in 1854. Le Blanc served as a member of the commission to reimburse people who had suffered losses during the Lower Canada Rebellion. In 1845, he married Sophie Lindsay, the daughter of William Lindsay. Le Blanc probably died at Portage-du-Fort.
