= Joseph Roy (Lower Canada politician) =

Canadian politician

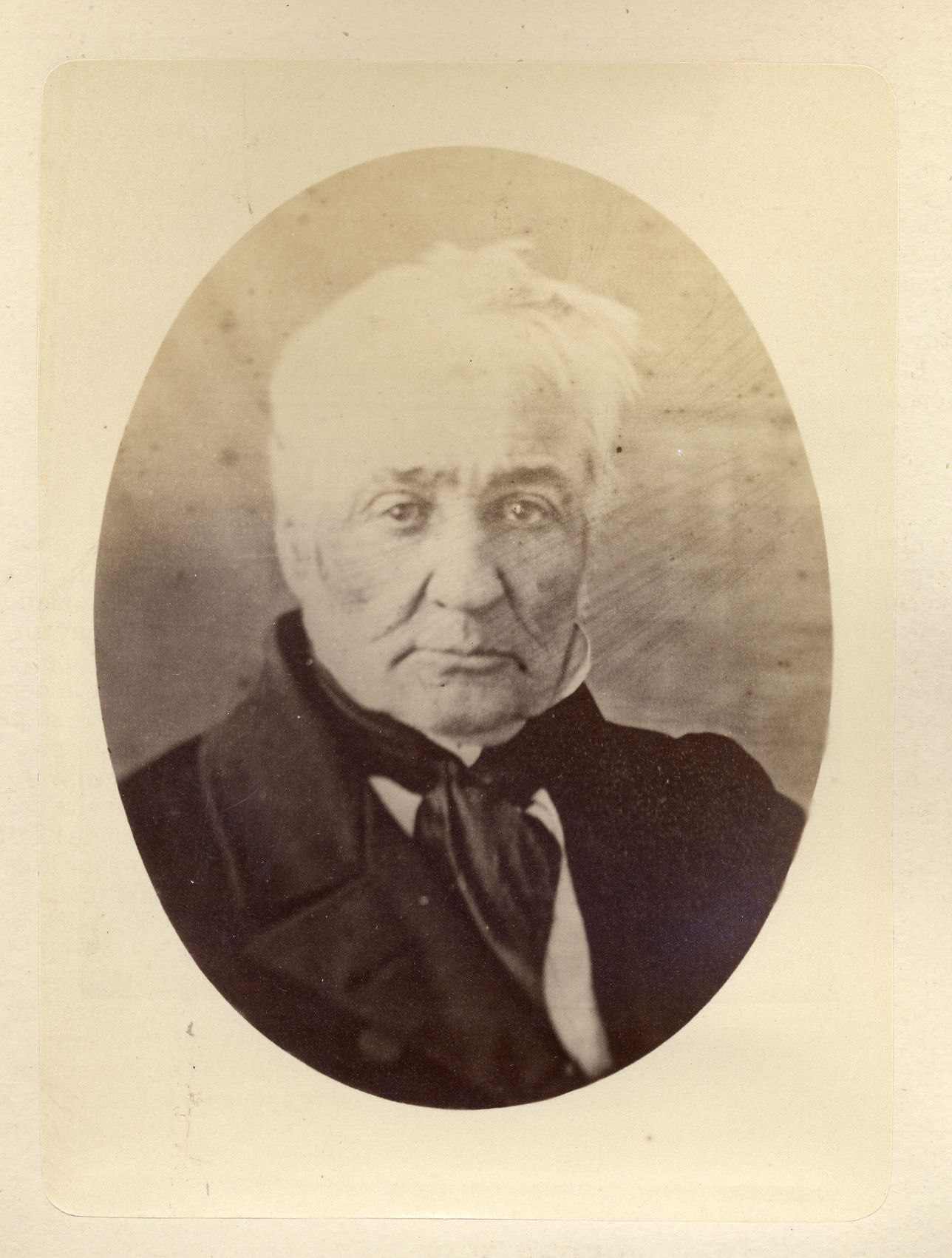
Joseph Roy, Lower Canada politician

Joseph Roy (1771 – July 31, 1856) was a wood carver, businessman and political figure in Lower Canada.

He was born Joseph-Marie Roy at Saint-Henri-de-Mascouche in 1771, the son of farmer Charles Roy, and apprenticed at Montreal as a woodcarver. Around 1804, he opened a general store in Montreal. He served in the local militia during the War of 1812, later becoming captain. In 1819, he married Émélie-Sophie, the daughter of merchant Charles Lusignan. Roy was a justice of the peace but lost this position when he swore out warrants for the arrest of two British soldiers implicated in the deaths of three supporters of Daniel Tracey in 1832. He served on the town council for Montreal. In 1834, he was elected to the Legislative Assembly of Lower Canada for Montreal East as a member of the parti patriote. He supported the Ninety-Two Resolutions. In 1835, he helped found the Union patriotique. He did not support the use of force but favoured constitutional change. In 1852, Roy helped found the newspaper Le Pays. He retired from business in 1853 after a fire damaged his store.

He died in Montreal in 1856.

His daughter Magdeleine-Émilie-Alphonsine married Norbert Dumas, who served as a member of the assembly for the Province of Canada.
