= Melchior-Alphonse de Salaberry =

Canadian lawyer and political figure

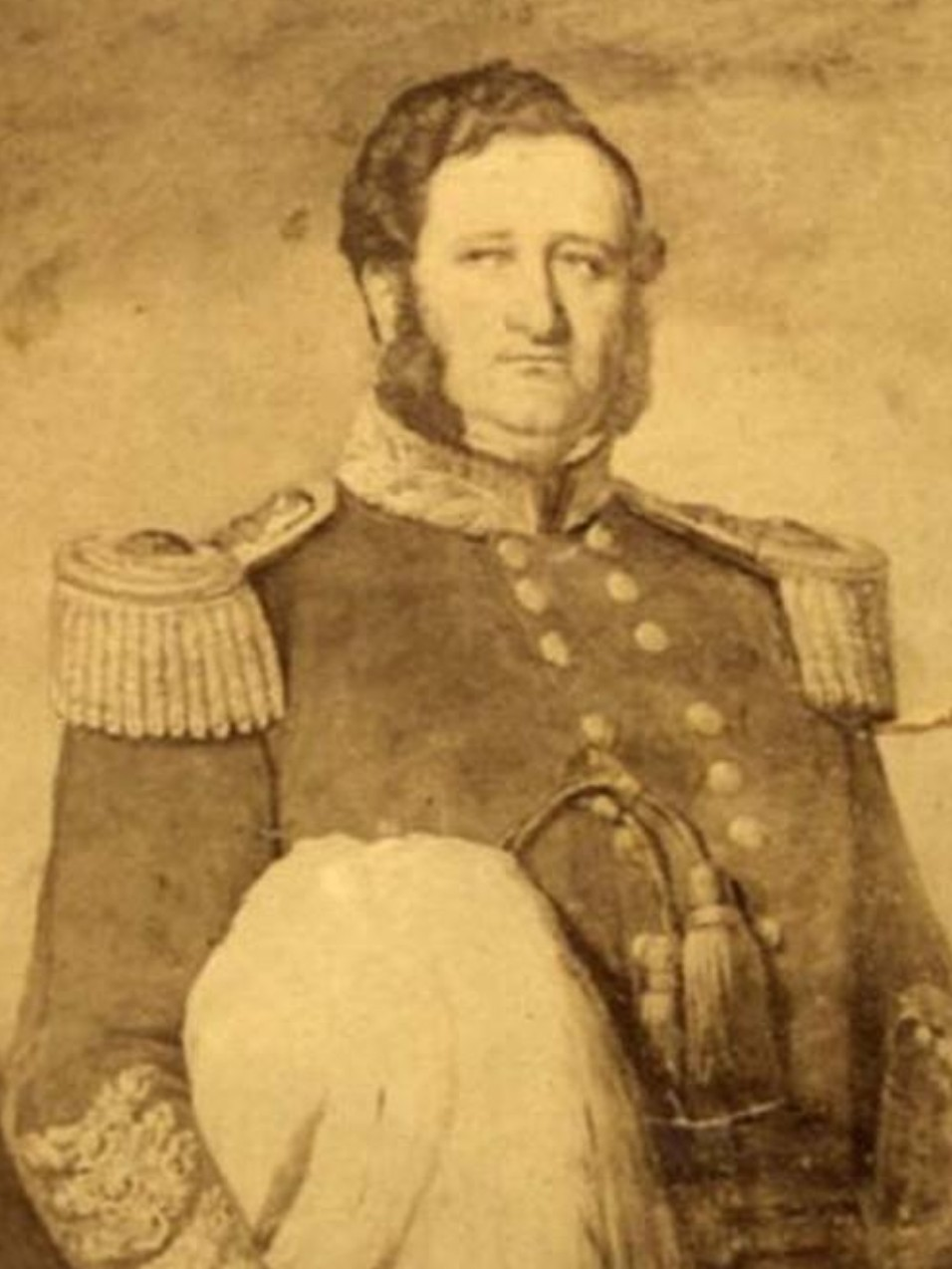

Member of the Legislative Council of Lower Canada
- In office 1837–1838
- Succeeded by: Position abolished

Member of the Legislative Assembly of the Province of Canada for Rouville
- In office 1841–1842
- Preceded by: New position
- Succeeded by: William Walker

Assistant Adjutant General, Lower Canada militia
- In office 1848–1867

Personal details
- Born: May 19, 1813 Saint-Philippe-de-Laprairie, Lower Canada
- Died: March 27, 1867 (aged 53) Quebec City, Canada East
- Party: Unionist; Government supporter/Tory
- Spouse: Marie-Émilie Guy
- Relations: Michel de Sallaberry (great-grandfather); Ignace-Michel-Louis-Antoine d'Irumberry de Salaberry (paternal grandfather); Jean-Baptiste-Melchior Hertel de Rouville (maternal grandfather); Louis Guy (father-in-law); Charles-René-Léonidas d'Irumberry de Salaberry (brother)
- Children: 8 children
- Parent: Lt Col Charles de Salaberry (father)
- Occupation: Military officer, coroner, lawyer

Military service
- Allegiance: British Empire; Lower Canada
- Branch/service: Lower Canada militia
- Rank: Lieutenant Colonel
- Commands: 2nd battalion, Chambly militia
- Battles/wars: Lower Canada Rebellion: Fort Chambly

Melchior-Alphonse de Salaberry (or Melchior-Alphonse d'Irumberry de Salaberry; May 19, 1813 – March 27, 1867) was a soldier, coroner, lawyer and political figure in Lower Canada (now Quebec). From a military family, he acted for the colonial government of Lower Canada during the Lower Canada Rebellion of 1837, successfully defending Fort Chambly, a major fortification, from an attempt by the Patriotes to capture it. He had a brief political career in the Parliament of the Province of Canada. He then practised as a lawyer, and became a coroner. From 1848 until his death, he was the assistant adjutant-general of the Lower Canada militia.

== Family and early life ==
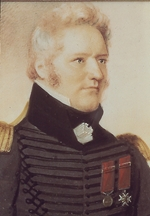
Charles-Michel de Salaberry, father of Melchior-Alphonse de Salaberry

De Salaberry was born in Saint-Philippe-de-Laprairie, Lower Canada in 1813, the son of Lieutenant-Colonel Charles-Michel d'Irumberry de Salaberry, the hero of the Battle of Châteauguay, and Marie-Anne-Julie Hertel de Rouville. His family had a long tradition of military service, first for the French navy, and later for the British military, after New France became a British possession. Both he and his younger brother, Charles-René-Léonidas d'Irumberry de Salaberry, served in the Canadian militia.

His father, Charles de Salaberry, had a significant military career, with both the British Army and the Lower Canada militia. He had been stationed in the Caribbean and Europe during the Napoleonic wars. He returned to Canada in 1810. During the War of 1812, he led the Canadian forces at the Battle of Châteauguay, defeating an American invading force that planned to capture Montreal. His reputation as the "Hero of Châteauguay" further enhanced the status of the family.

The de Salaberry family was well-off and well-connected. Both of Melchior-Alphonse's grandfathers were owners of seigneuries, and both had been members of the Legislative Assembly of Lower Canada: his paternal grandfather, Ignace-Michel-Louis-Antoine d'Irumberry de Salaberry for the riding of Dorchester, and his maternal grandfather, Jean-Baptiste-Melchior Hertel de Rouville for the town of Bedford. Both grandfathers were later appointed to the Legislative Council of Lower Canada, the upper house of the Parliament of Lower Canada. When Melchior-Alphonse's grandfather Hertel de Rouville retired from the Council, his father Charles-Michel was appointed in his place. His grandfather Louis-Antoine de Salaberry and his father Charles-Michel thus served together on the Legislative Council.

In addition, his grandfather Louis-Antoine d'Irumberry de Salaberry had formed a friendship with Prince Edward, Duke of Kent, when the Prince was stationed in Quebec City. Prince Edward subsequently used his influence as a son of King George III to assist Louis-Antoine de Salaberry in colonial and imperial patronage, such as obtaining commissions in the British Army for Louis-Antoine de Salaberry's sons. He acted as a patron and advisor for Charles-Michel in his military career.

== Early career ==
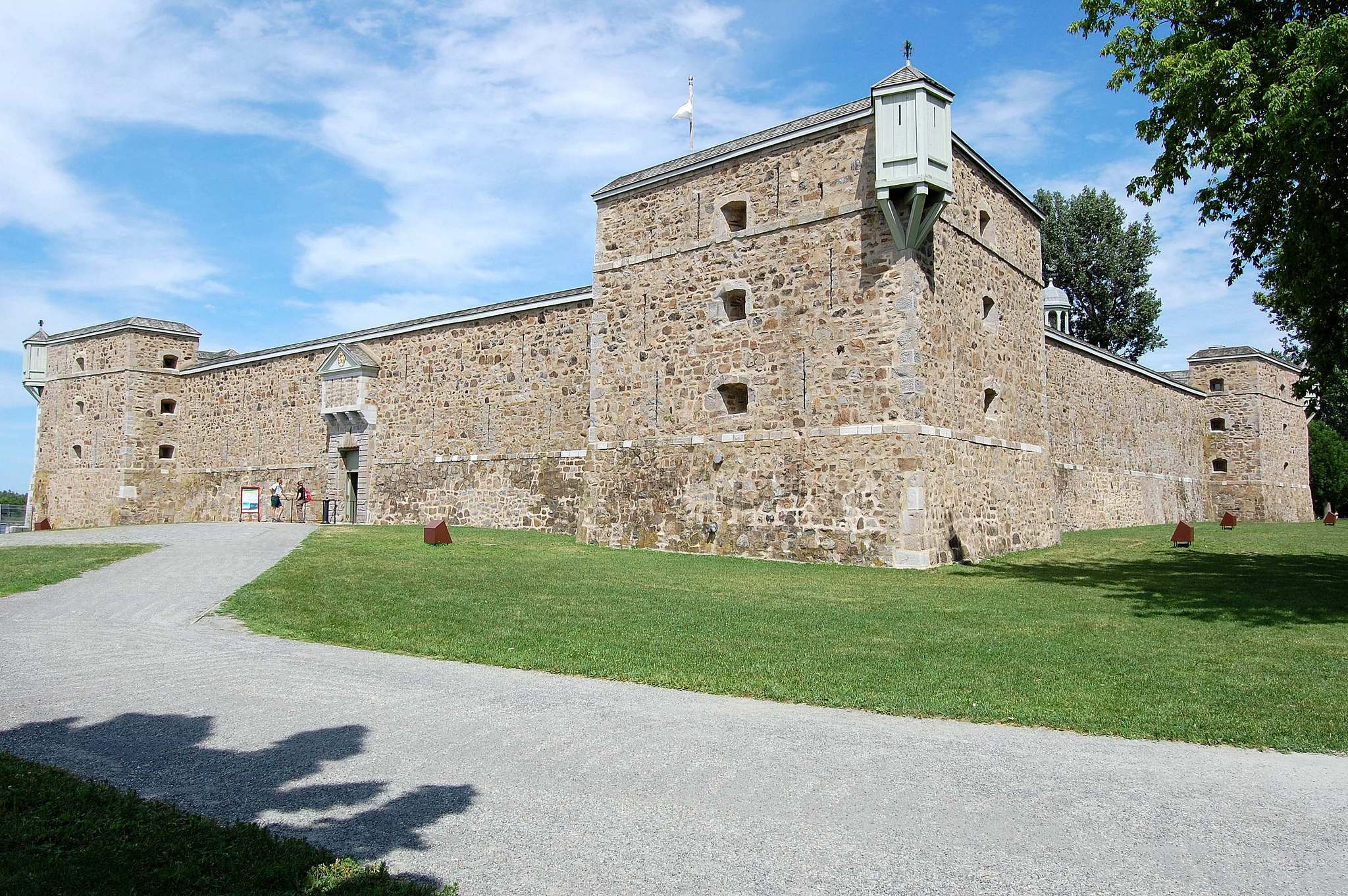
Fort Chambly, which de Salaberry defended during the Lower Canada Rebellion

Because of his family connections, Melchior-Alphonse de Salaberry found early advancement in the provincial government. When he was 16, the Governor General offered him a commission in the British army, which his mother turned down, but five years later, at age 21, he was given the position of aide-de-camp extraordinaire. In 1836, at age 23, he was appointed commissioner for small claims for the parish of Saint-Joseph-de-Chambly. In March, 1837, at age 24, he was appointed lieutenant colonel in the Lower Canada militia, commanding the 2nd battalion of the Chambly militia. In August 1837, he was appointed to the Legislative Council of Lower Canada, a lifetime appointment.

In 1837, when the Lower Canada Rebellion broke out, he led the 2nd battalion of the Chambly militia. They prevented the capture of Fort Chambly by the Patriotes. However, five militiamen under his command lodged accusations of cowardice against him. On investigation, it was determined that the allegations had been orchestrated by a lieutenant in his unit, who had earlier refused to follow orders given by de Salaberry. The allegations were found to be false and the lieutenant was relieved of his position.

In 1838, the British government suspended the constitution of Lower Canada, and created an appointed Special Council to govern the province. De Salaberry was offered a position on the Council, but refused it.

== Province of Canada politics ==
Following the rebellion in Lower Canada, and the similar rebellion in 1837 in Upper Canada (now Ontario), the British government decided to merge the two provinces into a single province, as recommended by Lord Durham in the Durham Report. The Union Act, 1840, passed by the British Parliament, abolished the two provinces and their separate parliaments, and created the Province of Canada, with a single Parliament for the entire province, composed of an elected Legislative Assembly and an appointed Legislative Council. The Governor General initially retained a strong position in the government.

With the abolition of the Parliament of Lower Canada, de Salaberry lost his seat in the Legislative Council. He stood for election to the new Legislative Assembly of the Province of Canada in the electoral district of Rouville, the location of his maternal grandfather's seigneury. De Salaberry supported the union of the Canadas, while his opponent, Timothée Franchère, had fought for the Patriotes in the Rebellion and opposed the union. De Salaberry won a narrow victory in a violent election, which resulted in one death.

In the first session of the new Parliament, the issue of the union was debated, and a motion critical of the union was defeated. De Salaberry was one of only two French-Canadian members who voted in favour of the union, the other being Alexandre-Maurice Delisle. Throughout the session, De Salaberry was a consistent supporter of the Governor General, Lord Sydenham.

On January 1, 1842, de Salaberry accepted the lucrative position of clerk of the Richelieu district court. Since this was an office of profit under the Crown, the law required de Salaberry to resign his seat in the Assembly. He stood as a candidate in the subsequent by-election, but was defeated by William Walker.

== Later life ==
De Salaberry was admitted to the bar in 1845 and practised law with Robert-Shore-Milnes Bouchette, a Patriote who had participated in the Rebellion. In 1847, de Salaberry was appointed assistant coroner of Montreal and, in 1848, assistant adjutant-general of the Lower Canada militia. He served in this last post until his death at Quebec City in 1867.

De Salaberry died in March 1867 and was buried at the church of the Nativité-de-Notre-Dame, at Beauport.

== Marriage and family ==
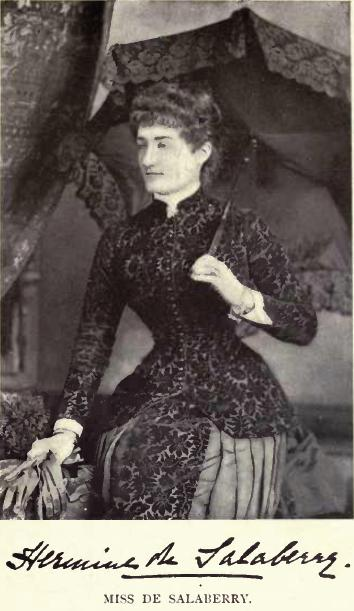
Hermine de Salaberry

In 1846, de Salaberry married Marie-Émilie Guy, the daughter of Louis Guy, a veteran of the Battle of Châteauguay, but a supporter of the Patriotes up to the time of the Lower Canada Rebellion. The couple had eight children.

One daughter, Hermine de Salaberry, was accorded a private audience with Queen Victoria at the instance of the queen's daughter, Princess Louise, whose husband, the Marquess of Lorne, was serving as Governor General of Canada. The queen was the daughter of Prince Edward, Duke of Kent, who had had a friendship with Louis-Antoine de Salaberry.

In 1895, Hermione unveiled the monument to her grandfather, Charles-Michel de Salaberry, commemorating the Battle of Châteauguay.
