= Charles de Salaberry =

French-Canadian military officer (1778–1829)

Charles de Salaberry CB
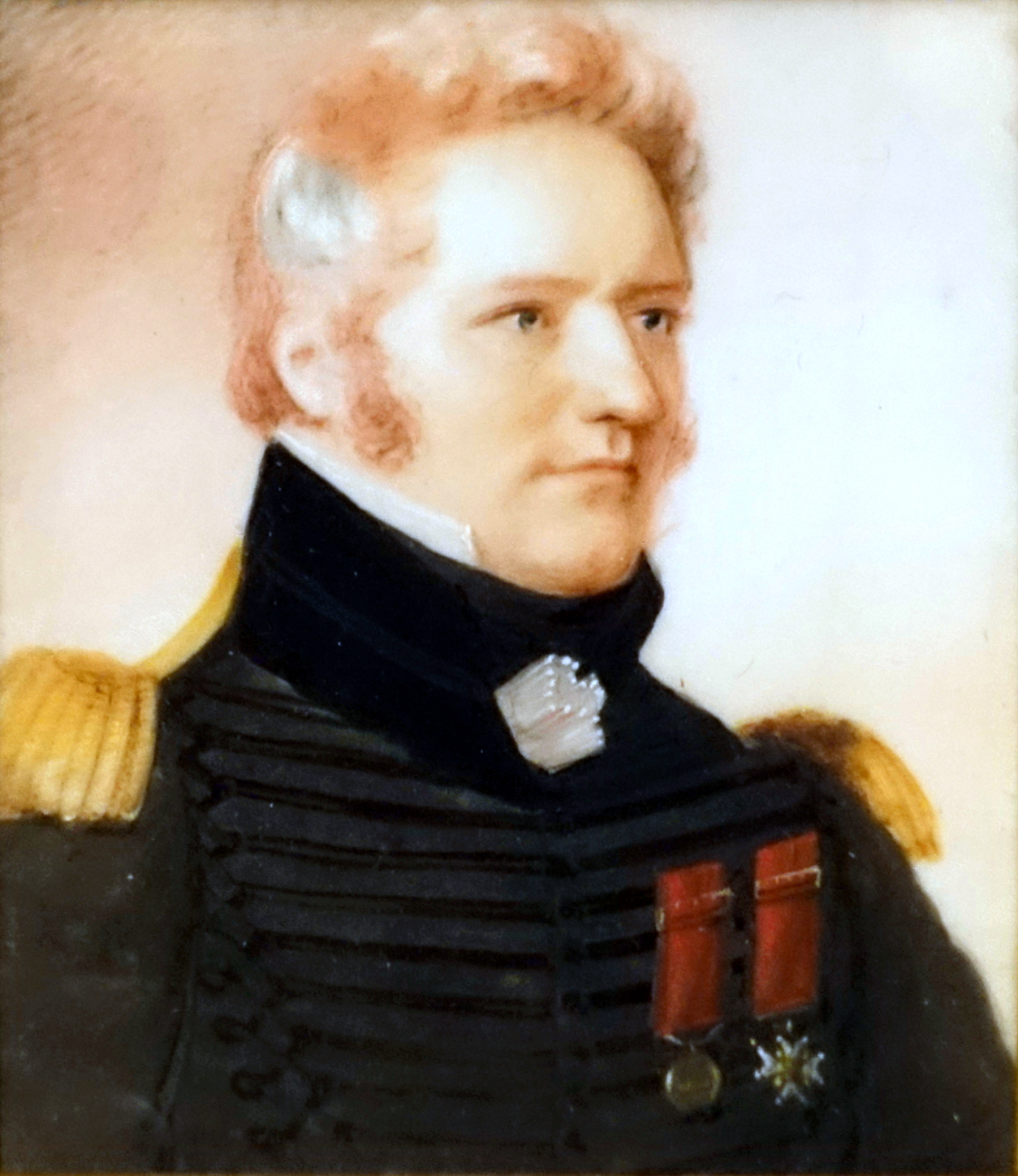
- Portrait by Anson Dickinson, 1825

Member of the Legislative Council of Lower Canada
- In office 14 December 1818 – 27 February 1829

Personal details
- Born: 19 November 1778 Beauport, Old Province of Quebec
- Died: 27 February 1829 (aged 50) Chambly, Lower Canada
- Party: Château Clique
- Spouse: Marie-Anne-Julie Hertel de Rouville
- Relatives: Michel de Sallaberry (grandfather); Ignace-Michel-Louis-Antoine d'Irumberry de Salaberry (father); Jean-Baptiste-Melchior Hertel de Rouville (father-in-law); Melchior-Alphonse de Salaberry (son); Charles-René-Léonidas d'Irumberry de Salaberry (son)

Military service
- Allegiance: British Empire
- Branch/service: British Army; Canadian Militia
- Years of service: 1794–1815
- Rank: Lieutenant colonel
- Commands: Canadian Voltigeurs
- Battles/wars: French Revolutionary Wars; Haitian Revolution; Napoleonic Wars; Walcheren Campaign; War of 1812; Battle of Lacolle Mills (1812); Battle of the Chateauguay
- Awards: Battle of Chateauguay Medal; Companion of the Order of the Bath

Lieutenant-Colonel Charles-Michel d'Irumberry de Salaberry, CB (19 November 1778 – 27 February 1829) was a Canadian military officer and politician who served in the French Revolutionary and Napoleonic Wars and War of 1812. He is best known for repelling an American invasion of Quebec at the Battle of the Chateauguay.

== Early years ==
Born at the manor house of Beauport (east of Quebec City) in Lower Canada on 19 November 1778 the son of Ignace-Michel-Louis-Antoine d'Irumberry de Salaberry, a descendant of a prominent family from the Basque province of Labourd. Charles was one of four sons in a family with a long tradition of military service. Generations of the family had served as officers of the Royal Army in France, and then in the New World. When the British acquired Canada in 1763, the family continued its military traditions in British service. Charles-Michel's father, Ignace de Salaberry, was Seigneur de Chambly et de Beaulac, and was also a British Army officer who had fought in the defence of Quebec during the American Revolutionary War, and later served as a member of the Legislative Assembly of Lower Canada, and the Legislative Council of Lower Canada.

== Military career ==
At the age of 14, Charles-Michel followed his father's footsteps into the 44th Regiment of the British Army. He soon transferred to the 60th Regiment and saw action with them in the West Indies. Shortly after landing in St. Domingue, his battalion was reduced to 200 men through the effects of yellow fever, and endured a march through the countryside to undertake the siege of Fort Matilda. de Salaberry was subsequently cited for bravery, maintaining his duties during the siege which killed or wounded all but three of the battalion's remaining 200 men. He was charged with the evacuation of the surviving men, despite the difference in age and rank.

He later served admirably in the Netherlands, during the Walcheren Campaign. He earned his commission as Captain-Lieutenant in 1799 and was given a company command in 1803, continuing to serve in Europe and the West Indies. While stationed at Jamaica, de Salaberry was directly involved in a bitter duel, retold by Philippe-Joseph Aubert de Gaspé:

The officers of the 60th Regiment, of which Charles-Michel de Salaberry was Lieutenant, were of different nationalities, English, Prussians, Swiss, Hanoverians, and two French-Canadians, lieutenants de Salaberry and DesRivières. It was difficult to preserve harmony among them — the Germans especially being passionate, quarrelsome, and duellists. One morning, de Salaberry was sitting at breakfast with some of his brother officers, when one of the Germans entered, and looking at him with an insulting air, said, "I have just come from sending a French Canadian to the other world!" De Salaberry sprang like a tiger from his seat; but instantly calming himself, said, "We will finish breakfast, and then you shall have the pleasure of finishing another French Canadian." They fought, as was then the custom, with swords; both were noted for their great skill, and the contest was long and obstinate.

De Salaberry was very young; his antagonist more aged, and a rough bully. The young Canadian received a wound on his forehead, which time never effaced, and as it bled freely and interfered with his sight, friends attempted to stop the conflict; but he would not consent, but binding his handkerchief round his head, recommenced the fight with greater fury. At length his adversary fell mortally wounded.

In 1810, de Salaberry was recalled to Canada with the rank of Lieutenant-Colonel. He served as aide-de-camp to Major General Francis de Rottenburg, but in 1812 he was appointed to command a new corps of volunteers, the Canadian Voltigeurs (light infantry), and became a chief of staff for the militia. Les Voltigeurs were essentially militiamen, but de Salaberry trained them as regulars similar to the Fencible units raised in Upper Canada. He even paid for some of their equipment out of his own pocket.

== War of 1812 ==
In November 1812, during the War of 1812, de Salaberry commanded the advance guard of the force that turned away Henry Dearborn's northern attack at Lacolle Mill. Later, some of his Voltigeurs took part in the decisive Battle of Crysler's Farm, described by some as the battle that "saved Canada."

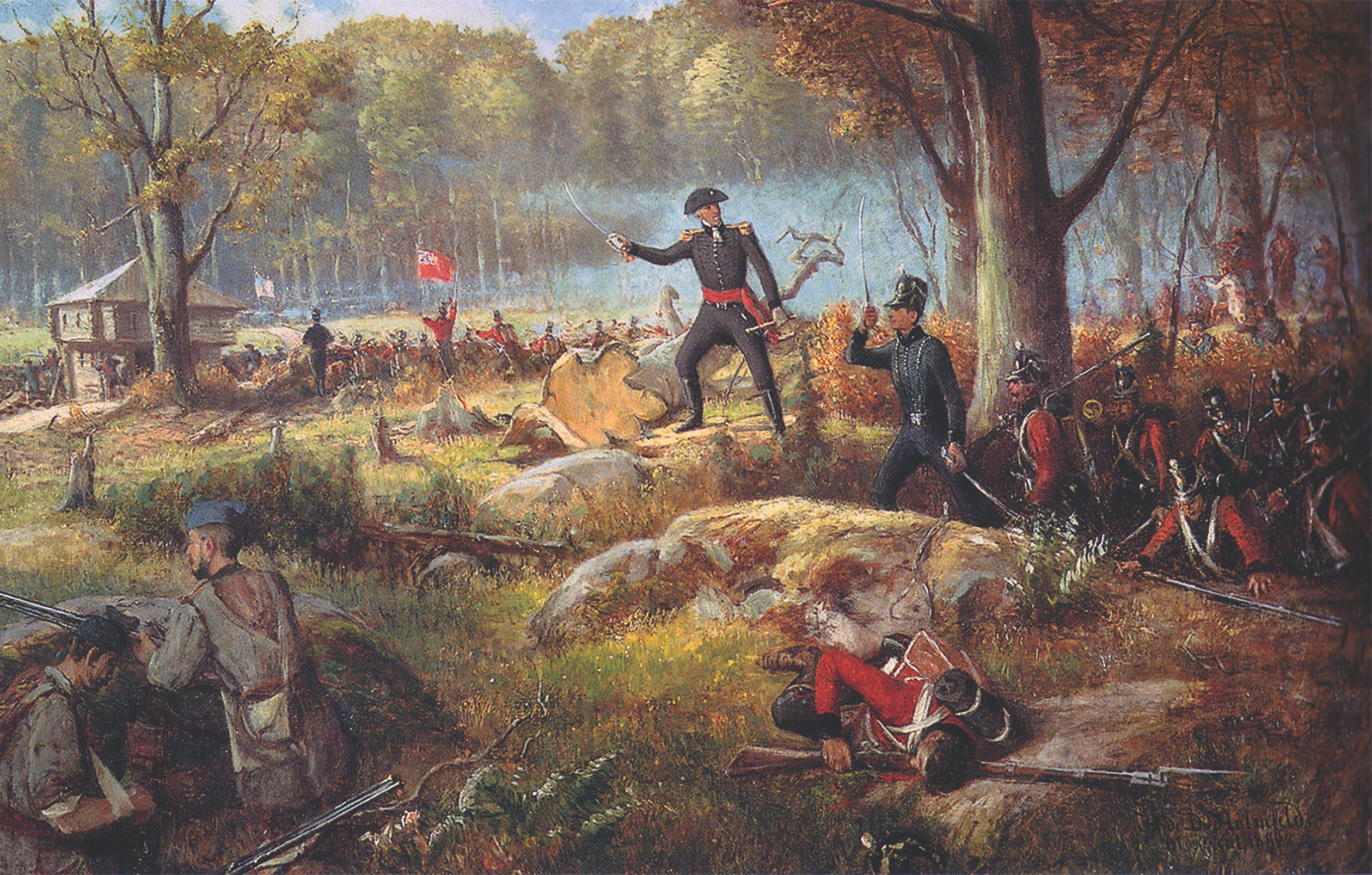
During the Battle of Chateauguay, de Salaberry (centre) led local fencibles, militia, and Mohawk warriors against American forces.

De Salaberry 's greatest claim to fame came at Châteauguay in October 1813, when he intercepted and turned the American troops advancing on Montreal under Major General Hampton. With regular reports from loyal farmers along the border, de Salaberry knew all of Hampton's movements and troop numbers, as the Americans approached the Châteauguay River south-west of Montreal. He ordered the felling of trees to build tangled breastworks of "abatis" in the ravines, where the Châteauguay met the English River, and he dispersed his troops through the woods. Facing Hampton's force of 4,000 troops (1,400 of whom were militia who refused to cross the border) and 10 cannon, de Salaberry led an advance guard of 250 Voltigeurs plus 50 allied warriors of the Kaunawakee Mohawk nation. The rest of de Salaberry's corps, 1,500 men, remained in reserve.

On 26 October, when Hampton encountered the barricades, he sent 1,500 of his troops to surround the Canadians. De Salaberry used the twilight and difficult terrain to confuse the enemy, ordering bugles to be blown from several locations and convincing Hampton that a much larger force was lurking in the darkness. Les Voltigeurs then launched a withering fire down into the ravine, inflicting numerous casualties. Unable to outflank de Salaberry, Hampton elected to withdraw back to the American border.

The encounter won fame and honours for de Salaberry, but had he not succeeded, his personal fortunes might have been quite different. He was so convinced that victory would be his that he neglected to report the Americans' advance to his senior officers. Failure would likely have meant a court-martial for him and, possibly, the fall of Montreal. The gambit worked, however: Britain struck a gold medal to commemorate the Battle of Chateauguay, and de Salaberry became a legendary figure in Quebec history.

Following the victory at the Châteauguay, de Salaberry was appointed Inspecting Field Officer of Light Troops in Canada.

== Later years ==
After the War of 1812, Charles de Salaberry became a folk hero in French Canada. He served as justice of the peace for various district courts, and in 1818 became a legislative councillor for Lower Canada. After his father's death, he became Seigneur of St. Mathias.

In 1817, he was made a Companion of the Order of the Bath.

Charles de Salaberry died in Chambly, Lower Canada (now Quebec) on 27 February 1829.

== Legacy ==
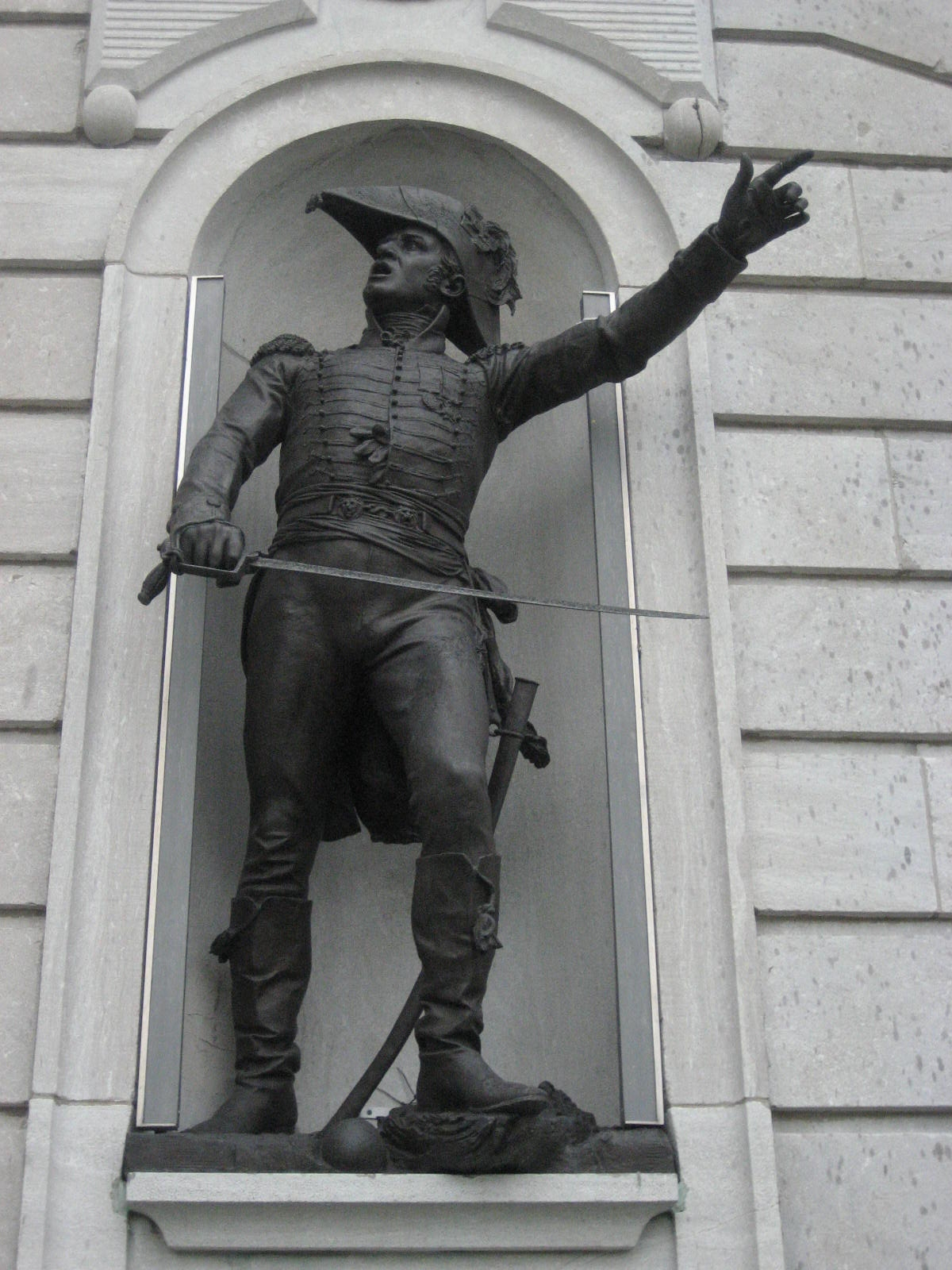
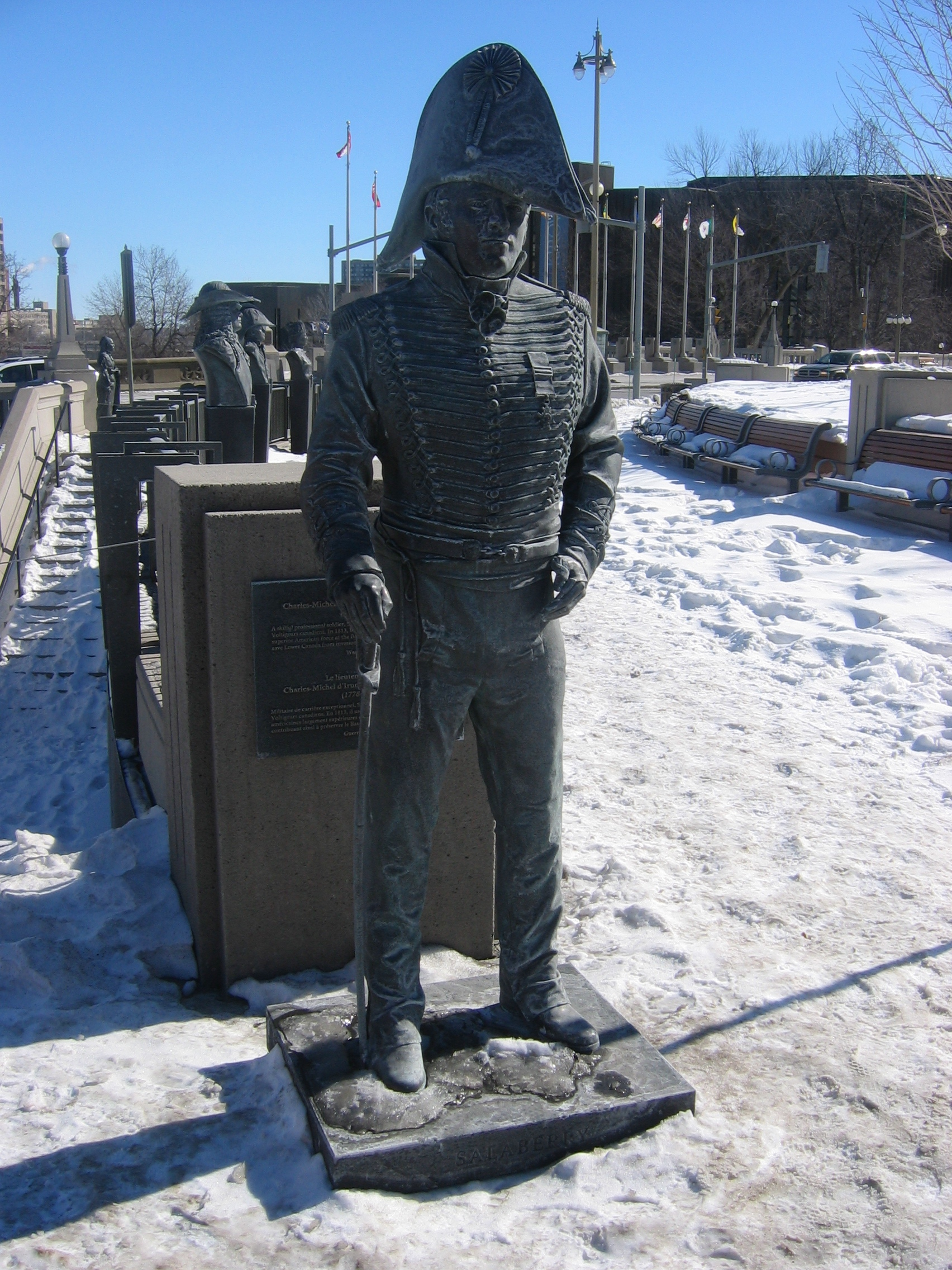
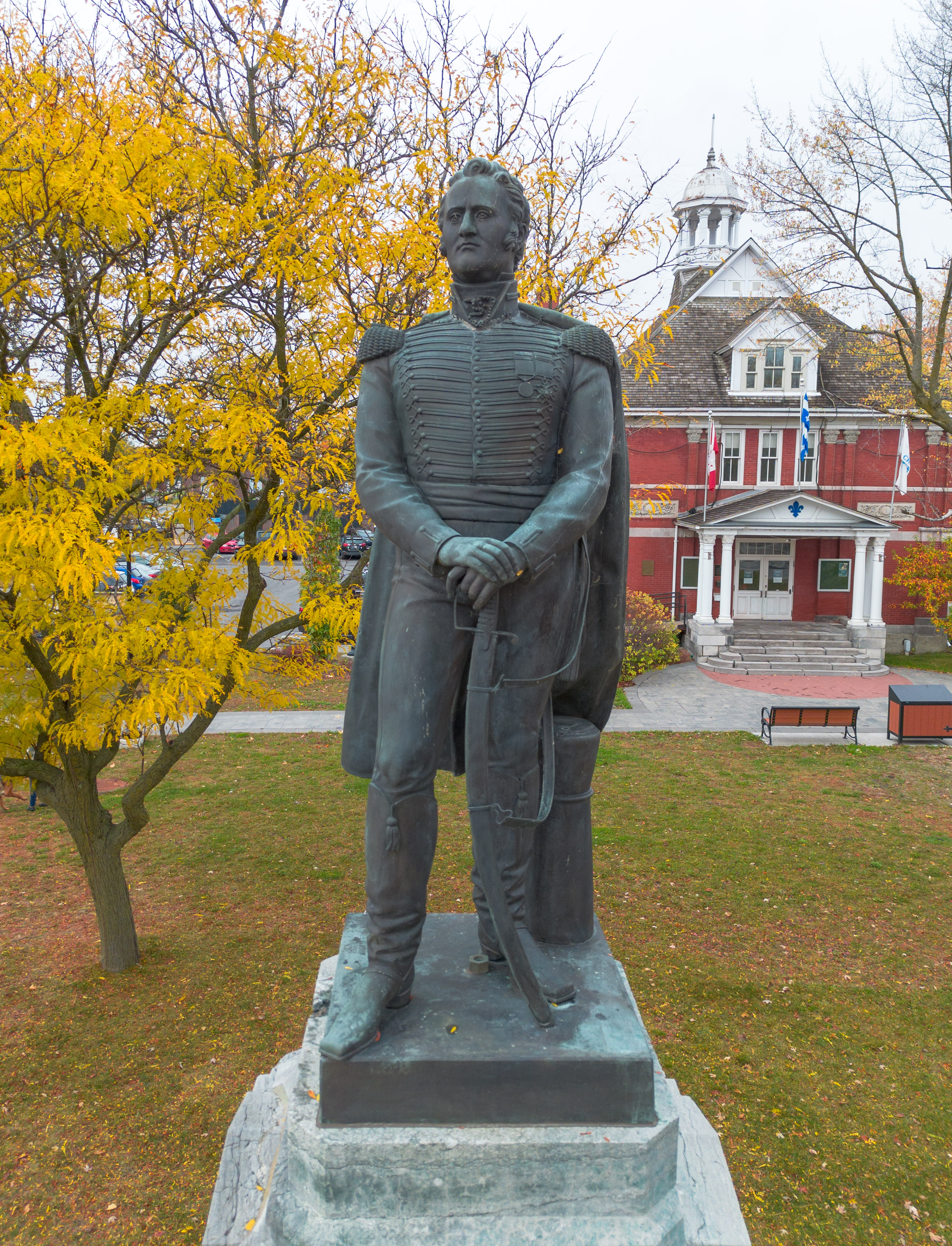
Statues of de Salaberry at Quebec's Parliament Building in Quebec City (left), at Valiants Memorial in Ottawa, and in Chambly, Quebec.

A bronze memorial at the corner of Bourgogne street and Salaberry street in Chambly, Quebec by Louis-Philippe Hébert and unveiled on 26 October 1881 by Dr. M.D.S. Martel and Mr. J.O. Dion, is an expression of gratitude towards Charles de Salaberry.

De Salaberry's house in Chambly was designated a National Historic Site of Canada in 1968.

The Royal Canadian Mint released a quarter with Salaberry's picture on it, on 18 March 2013, to celebrate the bicentennial of the War of 1812, the third in a series of four quarters. The Mint also released a two dollar coin (Toonie) on 18 June 2012 to mark the occasion. The Mint also issued a $4 coin in honor of his victory in at the battle of the Châteauguay, with "les Voltigeurs". In 2013 Canada Post issued a postage stamp commemorating Charles de Salaberry.

== His descendants ==
Charles de Salaberry has a large number of descendants spread across Canada. Two of his sons, Charles-René-Léonidas d'Irumberry de Salaberry and Melchior-Alphonse de Salaberry, also served in the army. The last two families to bear his name now live in Coquitlam, British Columbia, the interior of British Columbia (J.C.M. de Salaberry) and in Ontario (Nicolas de Salaberry of Toronto) Katryn de Salaberry and Lara de Salaberry.

Both the City of Salaberry-de-Valleyfield in Quebec and the Rural Municipality of De Salaberry in south-eastern Manitoba carry his name in remembrance for what he did in the War of 1812.

Some descendants lived in Gatineau (Hull) in the 1930s. The last traditionally built armouries in Canada, built in Hull in 1938, are named Le manège de Salaberry.

== See also ==
- Colonial Militia in Canada
