= Jean-Baptiste-René Hertel de Rouville =

Canadian politician

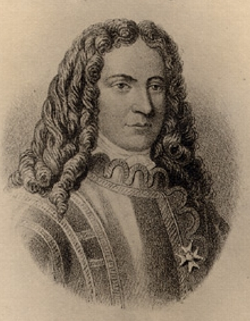

Member of the Legislative Assembly of Lower Canada
- In office 1824–1832

Member of the Legislative Council of Lower Canada
- In office 1837–1838

Personal details
- Born: June 20, 1789 Montreal, Province of Quebec
- Died: January 3, 1859 (aged 69) Boucherville, Lower Canada
- Relations: Jean-Baptiste-Melchior Hertel de Rouville, father

Jean-Baptiste-René Hertel de Rouville (June 20, 1789 – January 3, 1859) was a seigneur and political figure in Lower Canada.

He was born in Montreal, the son of Jean-Baptiste-Melchior Hertel de Rouville. He became a lieutenant in the militia around 1807 and served as a captain in the Canadian Voltigeurs during the War of 1812. Hertel de Rouville fought at the Battle of Châteauguay. He became commander of Chambly battalion in 1816. In 1817, he inherited the seigneury of Rouville and part of Chambly after his father's death. He was elected to represent Bedford in the Legislative Assembly of Lower Canada in 1824 and reelected in 1827. Hertel de Rouville signed a petition denouncing abuses by the government of Lord Dalhousie; this led to him being stripped of his rank in the militia in 1828. He was elected in the new riding of Rouville in 1830 and served until 1832, when he resigned due to ill health. He was named to the Legislative Council in August 1837 and served until the suspension of the constitution in March 1838 after the Lower Canada Rebellion. The parish priest of the region, Louis Nau, accused Hertel de Rouville of having supported rebel activity in the region. This led to him being treated with distrust by the authorities.

Hertel de Rouville became ill later in life and, after experiencing financial difficulties, sold off some of his properties. After the death of his wife in 1855, he is believed to have lived with a daughter at Beloeil. He died in Boucherville.
