= Joseph-Napoléon Poulin =

Joseph-Napoléon Poulin (1821 – June 19, 1892) was a physician and political figure in Canada East.

He was born Joseph Poulin in Sainte-Marie-de-Monnoir in Lower Canada in 1821 and practiced medicine and surgery there. In 1851, he was elected to the Legislative Assembly of the Province of Canada for Rouville; he was reelected in 1854. He resigned his seat in 1856 to run unsuccessfully in the Rougemont division for a seat in the Legislative Council. In 1863, he was elected again to the assembly and served until Confederation. He ran for the same seat in the federal parliament but was not elected. He died in Marieville in 1892.

In 1843, Poulin married Josephte Bourdages, the daughter of Rémi-Séraphin Bourdages and Marguerite Franchère, and the niece of Joseph and Timothée Franchère.

His brother Étienne represented Rouville in the Quebec assembly.

1867 Canadian federal election: Rouville
Party	Candidate	Votes
Liberal	Guillaume Cheval dit St-Jacques	1,236
Unknown	Joseph-Napoléon Poulin	824
Source: Canadian Elections Database
