= Abatis =

Field fortification made of sharpened trees

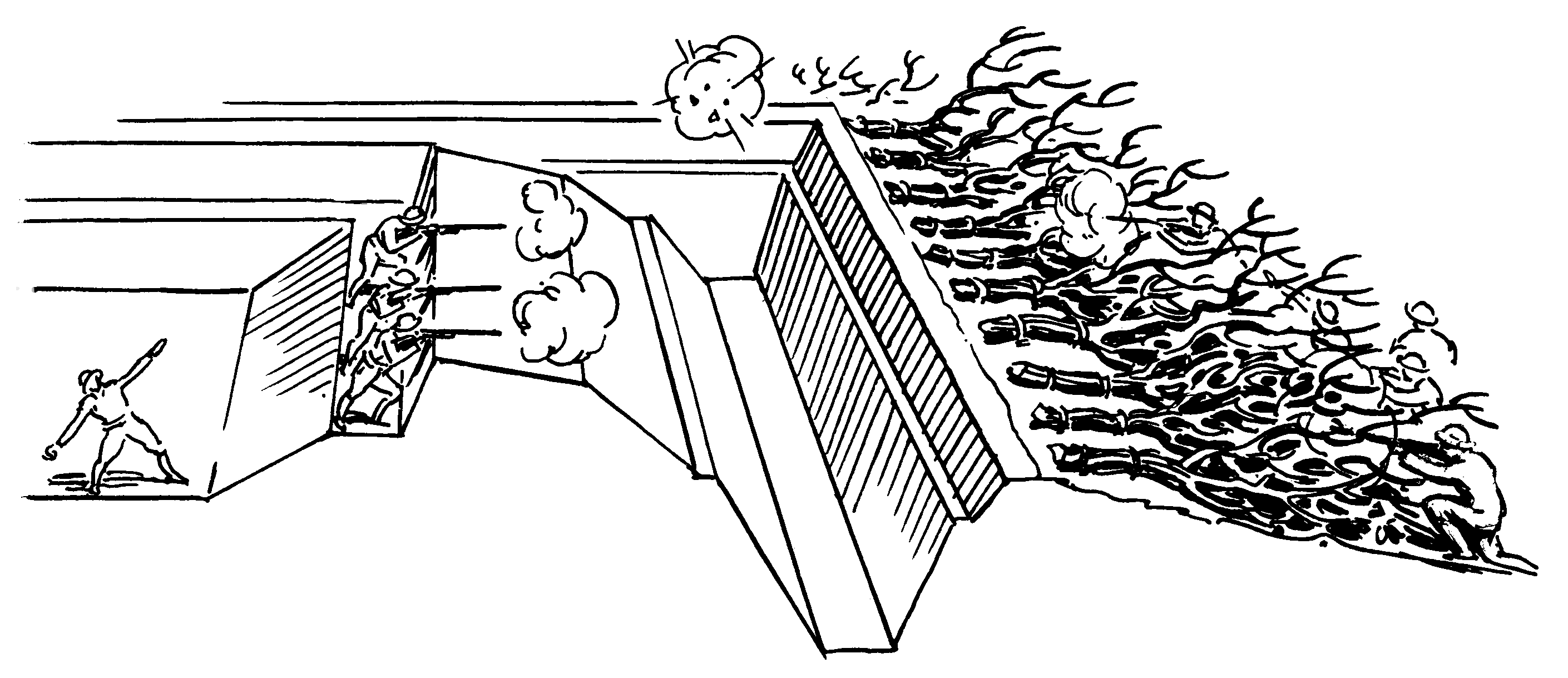
Abatisses are used in war to keep the approaching enemy under fire for as long as possible.

An abatis, abattis, or abbattis is a field fortification consisting of an obstacle formed of the branches of trees laid in a row, with the sharpened tops directed outwards, towards the enemy. The trees are usually interlaced or tied with wire. Abatis are used alone or in combination with wire entanglements and other obstacles.

== History ==
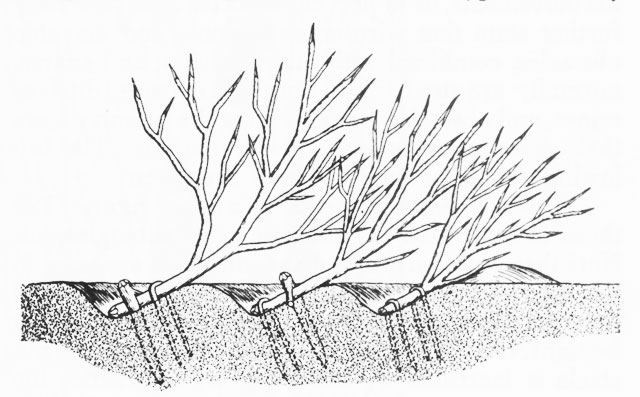
Abatis improvised by Japanese troops during World War II

Gregory of Tours mentions the use of abatis several times in his writing about the history of the early Franks. He wrote that the Franks ambushed and destroyed a Roman army near Neuss during the reign of Magnus Maximus with the use of an abatis. He also wrote that Mummolus, a general working for Burgundy, successfully used an abatis to defeat a Lombard army near Embrun.

A classic use of an abatis was at the Battle of Carillon (1758) during the Seven Years' War. The 3,600 French troops defeated a massive army of 16,000 British and Colonial troops by fronting their defensive positions with an extremely dense abatis. The British found the defences almost impossible to breach and were forced to withdraw with some 2,600 casualties. Other uses of an abatis can be found at the Battle of the Chateauguay, 26 October 1813, when approximately 1,300 Canadian Voltigeurs, under the command of Charles-Michel de Salaberry, defeated an American corps of approximately 4,000 men, or at the Battle of Plattsburgh.

== Construction ==
=== Modern ===
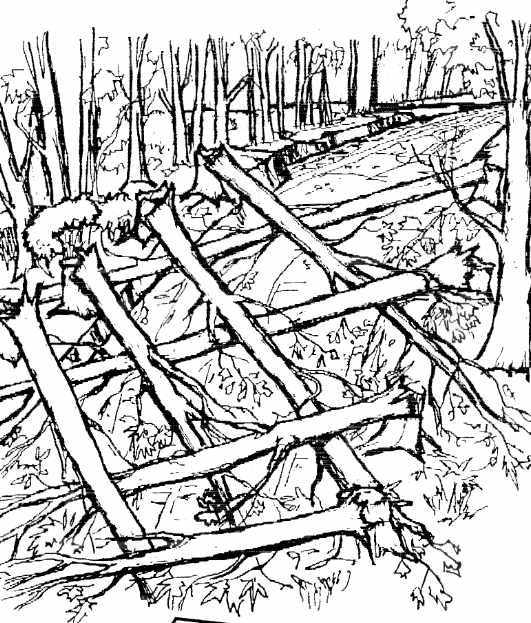
Giant abatis, made from entire trees, can make an effective anti-vehicle obstacle. This formation can be achieved by use of explosives—note the splintered stumps

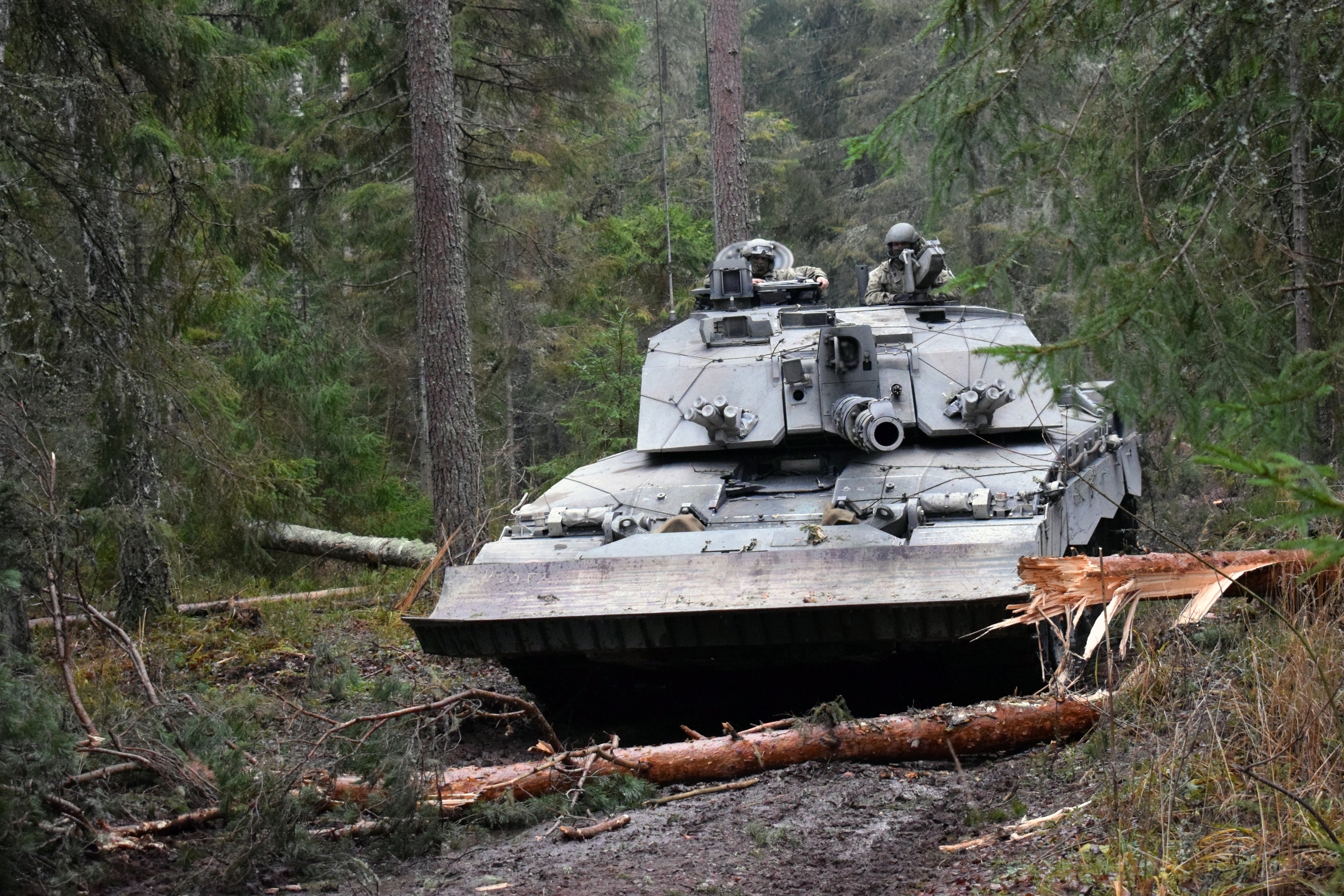
Abatis can be defeated by dozer blades, as fitted here to a British Challenger 2 tank

An important weakness of abatis, in contrast to barbed wire, is that it can be destroyed by fire. Also, if laced together with rope instead of wire, the rope can be very quickly destroyed by such fires, after which the abatis can be quickly pulled apart by grappling hooks thrown from a safe distance.

An important advantage is that an improvised abatis can be quickly formed in forested areas. This can be done by simply cutting down a row of trees so that they fall with their tops toward the enemy. An alternative is to place explosives so as to blow the trees down.

Abatis are rarely seen nowadays, having been largely replaced by wire obstacles. However, it may be used as a replacement or supplement when barbed wire is in short supply. A form of giant abatis, using whole trees instead of branches, can be used as an improvised anti-tank obstacle.

== See also ==
- Great Zasechnaya cherta
- Cheval de frise

== Bibliography ==
- This article incorporates text from a publication now in the public domain: Chisholm, Hugh, ed. (1911). "Abatis". Encyclopædia Britannica. Vol. 1 (11th ed.). Cambridge University Press.
