= Rouville (Province of Canada electoral district) =

Electoral district in former Province of Canada

Province of Canada electoral district

Defunct pre-Confederation electoral district
- Legislature: Legislative Assembly of the Province of Canada
- District created: 1841
- District abolished: 1867
- First contested: 1841
- Last contested: 1863

Rouville was an electoral district of the Legislative Assembly of the Parliament of the Province of Canada, in Canada East (now Quebec). It was located in a rural area south of Montreal, bordering on the Richelieu River. The district was created in 1841 and was based on the previous electoral district of the same name for the Legislative Assembly of Lower Canada. It was represented by one member in the Legislative Assembly.

In 1853, the provincial Parliament redrew the electoral map. The boundaries for Rouville were altered to some extent in the new map, which came into force for the 1854 general elections.

The electoral district was abolished in 1867, upon the creation of Canada and the province of Quebec.

== Boundaries ==
The electoral district of Rouville was south of Montreal (now in Le Haut-Richelieu Regional County Municipality), extending to the border with the United States.

=== 1841 to 1854 ===
The Union Act, 1840, passed by the British Parliament, merged the two provinces of Lower Canada and Upper Canada into the Province of Canada, with a single Parliament. The separate parliaments of Lower Canada and Upper Canada were abolished.

The Union Act provided that the pre-existing electoral boundaries of Lower Canada and Upper Canada would continue to be used in the new Parliament, unless altered by the Union Act itself. The Rouville electoral district of Lower Canada was not altered by the Act, and therefore continued with the same boundaries which had been set by a statute of Lower Canada in 1829:

The County of Rouville shall be bounded on the north west by the River Richelieu, or Chambly, together with all the Islands in the said river nearest to the said County, on the east and north east by the Counties of Missisquoui [sic] and Richelieu, and on the south by the southern boundary of the Province, comprising the seigniories of Rouville, Chambly East, Monnoir, and its augmentation, Bleury, Sabrevois, Noyan and Foucault.

=== 1854 to 1867 ===
In 1853, the Parliament of the Province of Canada passed a new electoral map. The boundaries of Rouville were altered to some extent by the new map, which came into force in the general elections of 1854:

The County of Rouville shall be bounded on the north-east by the County of Saint Hyacinthe as above described as far as the northern angle of the Parish of Saint Césaire, thence by the north-eastern limits of the Parishes of Saint Césaire and Saint Paul of Abbotsford, on the south-east by the Counties of Shefford, and Missisquoi as above described and by the southern limits of the Parishes of L'Ange Gardien, Saint Césaire, Sainte Marie and Saint Mathias, on the south-west and on the northwest by the River Richelieu, including all Islands in the said River nearest to or lying wholly or in part opposite the said County; which said County so bounded shall comprise the Parishes of Saint Mathias, Sainte Marie, Saint Hilaire, Saint Jean Baptiste, Saint Césaire, l'Ange Gardien and Saint Paul of Abbotsford.

== Members of the Legislative Assembly (1841–1867) ==
Rouville was a single-member constituency.

The following were the members of the Legislative Assembly for Rouville. The party affiliations are based on the biographies of individual members given by the National Assembly of Quebec, as well as votes in the Legislative Assembly. "Party" was a fluid concept, especially during the early years of the Province of Canada.

Parliament	Members	Years in Office	Party
1st Parliament; 1841–1844	Melchior-Alphonse d'Irumberry de Salaberry (Note: Seat vacated on appointment to office of profit under the Crown, January 1, 1842; defeated in subsequent by-election: Côté, Appointments and Elections, p. 59, note (38).)	1841–1842	Unionist and Government supporter
1st Parliament; 1841–1844	William Walker (Note: Elected in by-election, July 2, 1842; resigned seat August 26, 1843: Côté, Appointments and Elections, p. 59, note (39).)	1842–1843 (by-election)	"British" Tory
1st Parliament; 1841–1844	Timothée Franchère (Note: Defeated in general election, 1841; elected in second by-election, September 25, 1843: Côté, Appointments and Elections, p. 59, note (40).)	1843—1844 (by-election)	French-Canadian Group
2nd Parliament; 1844–1847	Timothée Franchère	1844–1847	French-Canadian Group
3rd Parliament; 1848–1851	Pierre Davignon	1848–1851	French-Canadian Group
4th Parliament; 1851–1853	Joseph-Napoléon Poulin	1851–1853	Ministerialist
5th Parliament; 1854–1857	Joseph-Napoléon Poulin (Note: Resigned seat September 3, 1856, to seek election to the Legislative Council: Côté, Appointments and Elections, p. 63, note (192).)	1854–1856	Ministerialist
5th Parliament; 1854–1857	William Henry Chaffers (Note: Elected in by-election, October 4, 1856 September 3, 1856, to seek election to the Legislative Council: Côté, Appointments and Elections, p. 63, note (193).)	1856–1857 (by-election)	Rouge
6th Parliament; 1858–1861	Thomas Edmund Campbell	1858–1861	Conservative
7th Parliament; 1861–1863	Lewis Thomas Drummond	1861–1863	Rouge
8th Parliament; 1863–1867	Joseph-Napoléon Poulin	1863–1867	Confederation; Bleu

== See also ==
- List of elections in the Province of Canada

== Significant elections ==
In the first general election for the new Parliament, the Rouville seat was won by Melchior-Alphonse de Salaberry, who narrowly defeated Timothée Franchère. The election was marked by considerable violence, with one death. De Salaberry was a strong supporter of the government of Lord Sydenham, the Governor General. He was also one of only two Canadiens elected who supported the union. The other was Alexandre-Maurice Delisle, elected in Montreal County.

However, the next year, De Salaberry accepted the lucrative position of Clerk of the Court for the district of Richelieu. Since this position was an office of profit under the Crown, the law required that de Salaberry vacate his seat. De Salaberry stood as a candidate in the resulting by-election, but was defeated by William Walker. Although Walker supported the British connection, he was a strong opponent of the union, and a fierce critic of Lord Sydenham's government. The by-election thus shifted the position in the Legislative Assembly somewhat.

The situation changed again in the next year, 1843. Walker was forced to resign his seat due to ill-health (and indeed died the following year). In the resulting by-election, Franchère was elected. Since he opposed the union and supported the Groupe canadien-français, the by-election again shifted the overall standings in the Legislative Assembly.

== Abolition ==
The district was abolished on July 1, 1867, when the British North America Act, 1867 came into force, splitting the Province of Canada into Quebec and Ontario. It was succeeded by electoral districts of the same name and boundaries in the House of Commons of Canada and the Legislative Assembly of Quebec.
