= Charles-René-Léonidas d'Irumberry de Salaberry =

French-Canadian militia officer

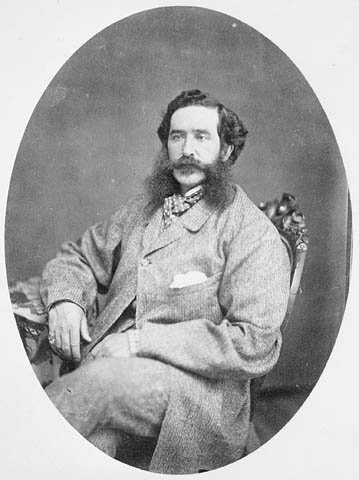

Personal details
- Born: August 27, 1820 Chambly, Lower Canada
- Died: March 25, 1882 (aged 61) L'Assomption, Quebec

Military service
- Allegiance: Lower Canada
- Branch/service: Canadian Militia
- Years of service: 1840-1869
- Rank: Lieutenant Colonel
- Commands: 2nd Rouville Militia Regiment; 9th Battalion, Voltiguers
- Battles/wars: Trent Affair; Fenian Raids

Charles-René-Léonidas d'Irumberry de Salaberry (27 August 1820 – 25 March 1882) was a French-Canadian militia officer, founding commanding officer of Les Voltigeurs de Québec, and civil servant noted for his role in negotiating on the behalf of the Government of Canada during the Red River Rebellion of 1869–1870. His father, Charles-Michel d'Irumberry de Salaberry was a hero of the Battle of Chateauguay during the War of 1812.

He served in the 2nd Regiment of Rouville Militia and was appointed a Lieutenant Colonel of that regiment in 1852. In March 1862, with the tensions from the Trent Affair, he raised the 9th Battalion Volunteer Rifles, Quebec Voltigeurs in Quebec City. The regiment was on active service in March 1866 during the Fenian Raids.

He was the brother of Melchior-Alphonse d'Irumberry de Salaberry.
