= Canadian Voltigeurs =

Provincial Corps of Light Infantry
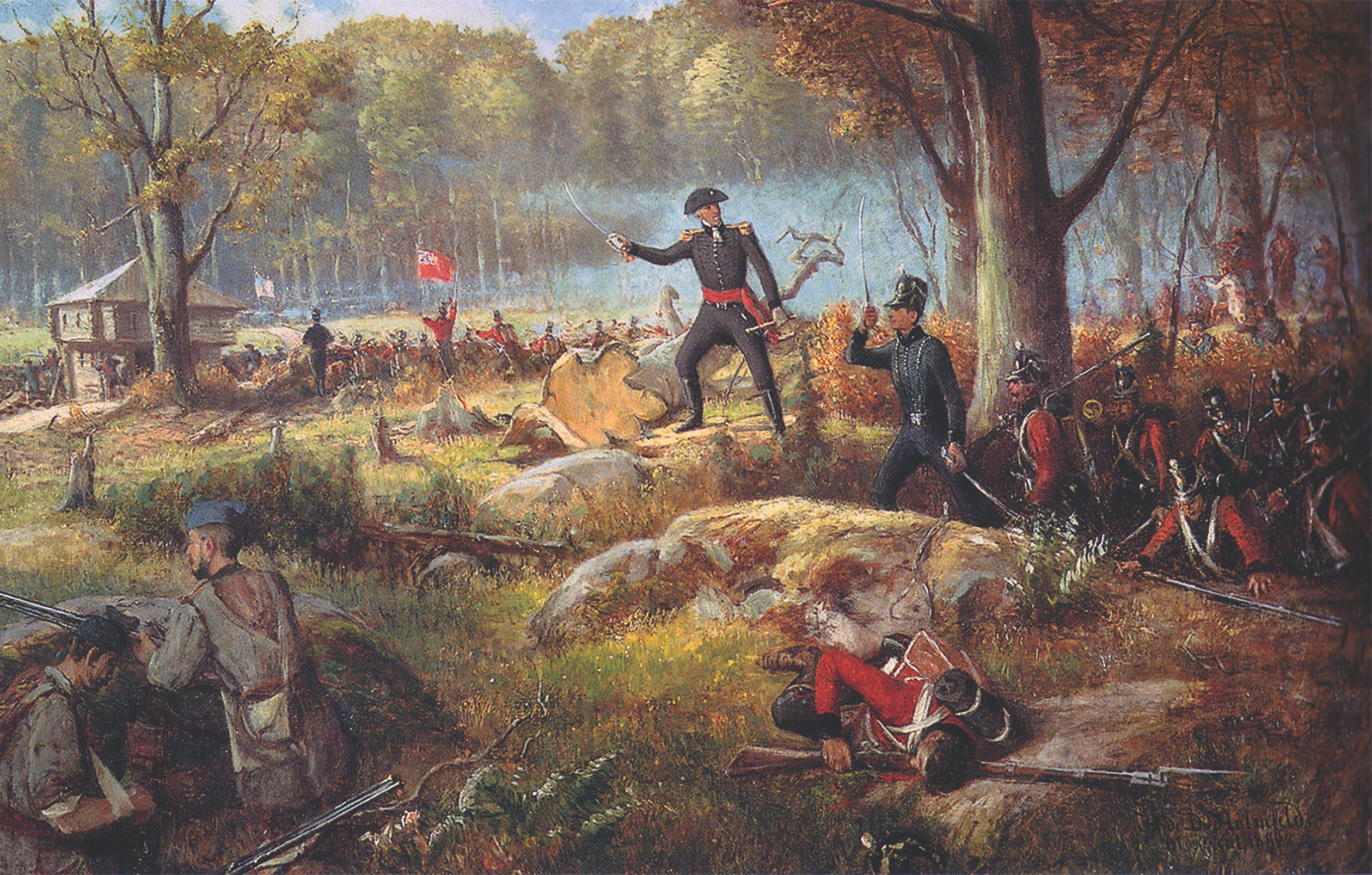
- Voltigeurs in action at the Battle of the Chateauguay
- Active: April 1812 – 24 May 1815
- Disbanded: 1815
- Country: Lower Canada
- Allegiance: British Empire
- Branch: Army
- Type: Light Infantry
- Size: Battalion
- Engagements: First Battle of Lacolle Mills; Second Battle of Sacket's Harbor; Battle of the Chateauguay; Battle of Crysler's Farm; Second Battle of Lacolle Mills; Battle of Plattsburgh

Commanders
- Notable commanders: Charles de Salaberry; Frederick Heriot

The Canadian Voltigeurs were a light infantry unit, raised in Lower Canada (the present-day Province of Quebec) in 1812, that fought in the War of 1812 between Britain and the United States.

== History ==
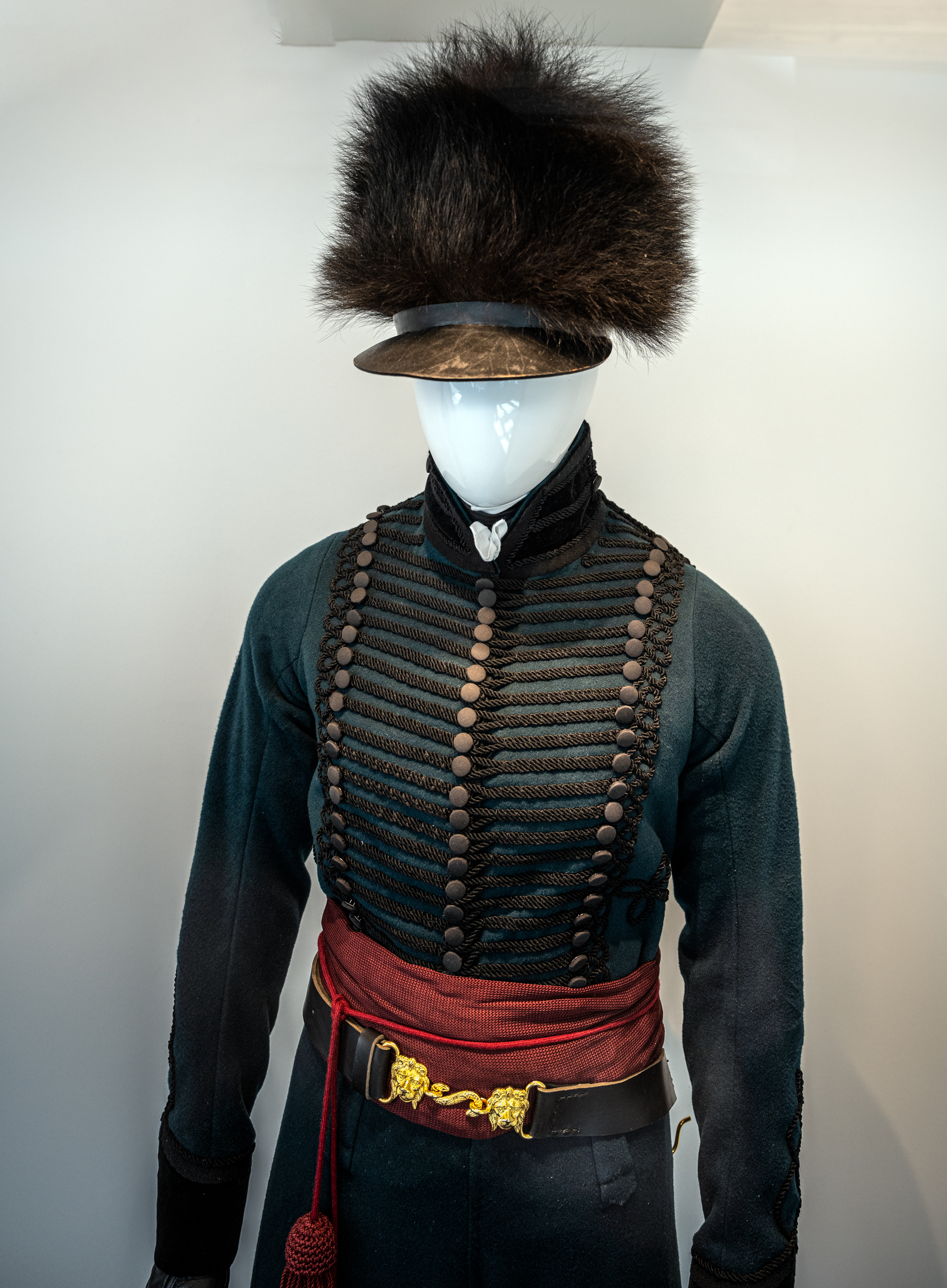
Uniform of an officer of the Canadian Voltigeurs

=== Formation ===
As war with the United States threatened, on 15 April 1812 Sir George Prevost, the Governor General of Canada, authorised the enlistment of a Provincial Corps of Light Infantry under Lieutenant Colonel Charles de Salaberry, to serve during war or the "apprehension of war".

The unit was officially part of the militia, and its enlisted personnel were subject to the Militia laws and ordinances, but for all practical purposes, it was administered on the same basis as the Fencible units, also raised in Canada as regular soldiers but liable for service in North America only.

De Salaberry selected members of the leading families of Lower Canada as officers, but their commissions were not confirmed until they had recruited their quota of volunteers (for example, 36 men for Captains, 14 for Lieutenants). Several other officers transferred from units of the British Army stationed in Canada, in the hope that they would gain rank or seniority by the transfer. Most of these officers remained with the Voltigeurs even when these ambitions were not fulfilled.

The ".. men to be enrolled in this corps to be between the age of 17 and 35 years and not below 5 feet 3 inches." Recruiting was brisk; in addition to a bounty of £4, the recruits were promised a grant of 50 acres (200,000 m^{2}) of land on discharge. Almost all the soldiers and most of the officers were French-speaking, which led to the unit being widely known as the Voltigeurs, a French word meaning "vaulter" or "leaper", and given to certain elite light infantry units in the French Army. However, all formal orders on the parade ground or in battle were given in English.

The Voltigeurs wore grey uniforms, with black facings and accoutrements. The coats were fitted with the padded "wings" worn by grenadier and light infantry units of the British Army. The headgear was a small black bearskin cap. Officers wore a hussar-type uniform, in bottle-green (or "rifle green", as it was becoming known). The weapon carried was the light infantry pattern of the British India Pattern Musket, though there may have been some rifles.

The new unit mustered at Chambly. It had eight companies of light infantry. Two further companies were recruited from Sedentary militia of the Eastern Townships of the Montreal district, and officially listed as the ninth and tenth companies, but they formed a separate corps, the Frontier Light Infantry, throughout the War of 1812.

When the unit was formed, "... An additional Company formed of Indians will be allowed to be attached to this corps, consisting of six Chiefs and sixty Warriors. This Company will be armed, clothed (after their own manner) & victualled at the expence of Government; they will receive presents as a reward instead of Pay."

=== Service in the War of 1812 ===
Some of the Voltigeurs were in action at the Battle of Lacolle Mills (1812), in which a half-hearted invasion of Canada by the American General Henry Dearborn was turned back.

Early in 1813 three companies were detached under the unit's second-in-command, Major Frederick Heriot, and moved up the Saint Lawrence River to form part of the garrison of Kingston, the main British base on Lake Ontario. On 29 May, two of these companies took part in the Second Battle of Sacket's Harbor. Later in the year, the detachment moved to Fort Wellington at Prescott, and subsequently played an important part in the Battle of Crysler's Farm.

The main body of the unit formed part of a light corps stationed to the south of Montreal, which was commanded by de Salaberry in person. Learning that an American division under Major General Wade Hampton was advancing from Four Corners in New York state, de Salaberry's force entrenched themselves by the River Chateauguay. On 26 October, Hampton attacked. Two companies of the Voltigeurs formed part of de Salaberry's front line, and five companies were part of his reserve. At the resulting Battle of the Chateauguay, Hampton was repulsed.

Early in 1814, the entire unit concentrated at Montreal, and was built back up to strength. De Salaberry had been appointed Inspecting Field Officer of Militia, and Major Heriot became the Voltigeurs' acting Commanding Officer. A company of the Voltigeurs played a large part in repulsing an American army under Major General James Wilkinson at the Second Battle of Lacolle Mills in March 1814.

The Voltigeurs were brigaded with the Frontier Light Infantry, and another militia light infantry unit, the Canadian Chasseurs for Governor General Prévost's advance into New York State in September 1814. The combined light infantry force formed part of a brigade under Major General Thomas Brisbane during the Battle of Plattsburgh, where the British army retreated after its supporting naval squadron was destroyed.

At the end of the war, the unit was disbanded on 24 May 1815.

== Legacy ==
The current Voltigeurs de Québec today perpetuate the history and traditions of the Canadian Voltigeurs within the Canadian Army. They also share a common link by the name, the province in which they are located and family ties since the founding commanding officer, Charles-René-Léonidas d'Irumberry de Salaberry was Charles de Salaberry's grandson, and named after him.

A junior ice hockey team in the QMJHL from Drummondville, Quebec, the Drummondville Voltigeurs, takes their name from the unit.

== See also ==
- Canadian units of the War of 1812
- Les Voltigeurs de Québec
