= Timothée Franchère =

Lower Canada merchant and politician

Member of the Legislative Assembly of the Province of Canada for Rouville
- In office 1843–1847
- Preceded by: William Walker
- Succeeded by: Pierre Davignon

Personal details
- Born: 1791
- Died: October 5, 1849 (approximately 59 years old) Saint-Mathias, Canada East, Province of Canada
- Party: French-Canadian Group
- Spouse: Louise-Eugénie Faribault
- Relations: Joseph Franchère (brother); Gabriel Franchère (cousin); Joseph-Charles Franchère (cousin)
- Children: 5 surviving at his death
- Occupation: Merchant; Canal commissioner

Military service
- Allegiance: Britain
- Branch/service: Lower Canada militia
- Years of service: 1812 to 1815
- Rank: Captain
- Unit: 1st Battalion, Rouville Militia
- Battles/wars: War of 1812

Timothée Franchère (c. 1791 – October 5, 1849) was a Canadien businessman and political figure in Lower Canada and then the Province of Canada. He participated in the Lower Canada Rebellion in 1837 and fled temporarily to the United States. Later, he was twice elected to the Legislative Assembly of the Province of Canada, sitting as a member of the French-Canadian Group.

== Early life and family ==
Franchère was born around 1790, the son of Antoine Franchère and Marie-Josette Nicolas. His older brother Joseph Franchère was a member of the Legislative Assembly of Lower Canada in the early 1820s. Their sister Marguerite married Rémi-Séraphin Bourdages who represented the Rouville area in the Lower Canada Assembly from 1830 to 1832. Gabriel Franchère, a fur trader with the American Fur Company and author of a diary about the fur-trade in the Pacific North-west, was a cousin, as was the painter, Joseph-Charles Franchère.

He served in the local militia during the War of 1812 and became captain in 1821, as well as adjutant for the Rouville district. He also served as a school commissioner.

== Business activities ==
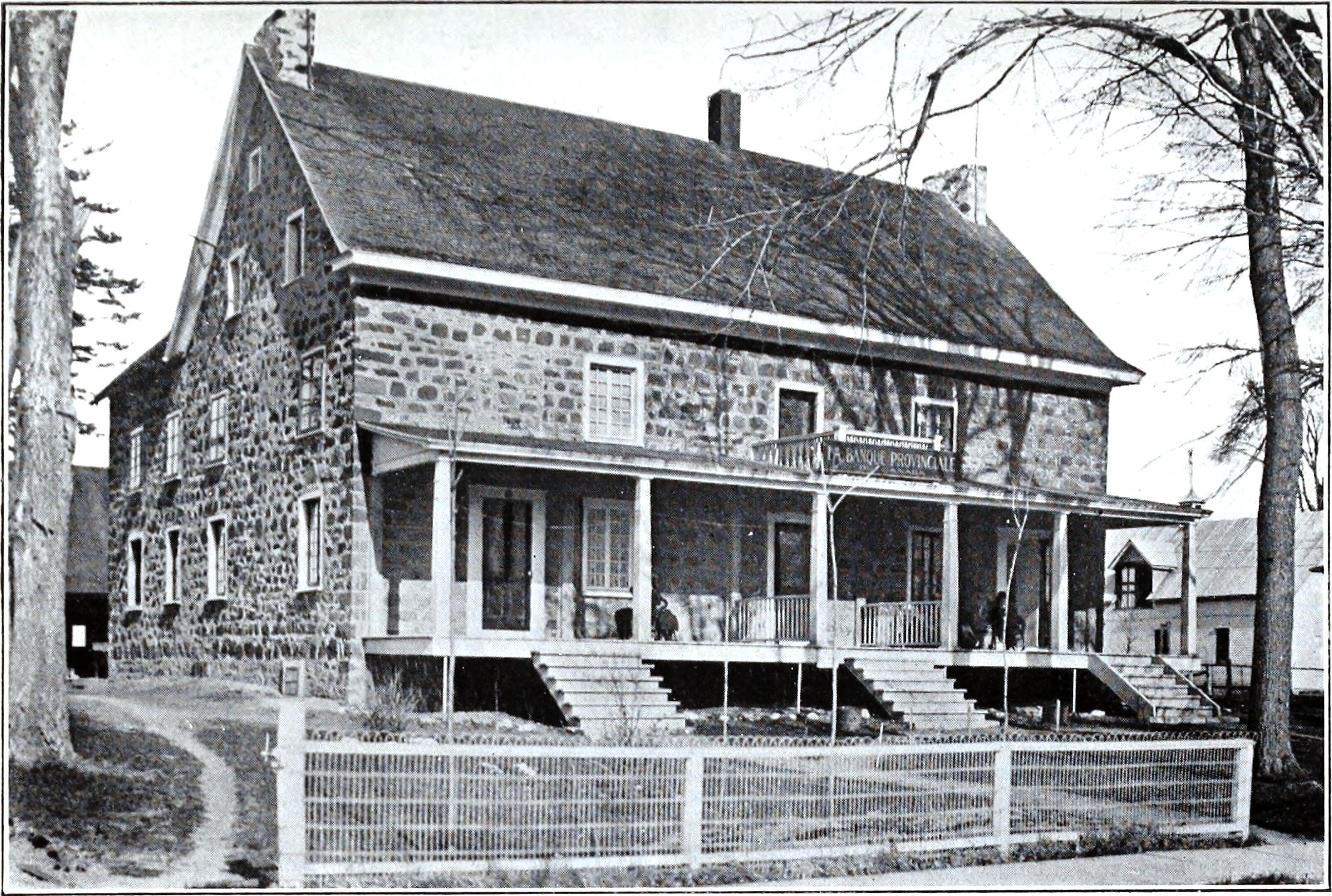
House built by Franchère and his brother in Saint-Mathias in the 1820s

Franchère became a merchant at Saint-Mathias, Lower Canada. In addition to a retail business, he developed a wholesale business in grains, which he sold to markets in Quebec City. He was also involved in the lumber trade and saw mills, and owned a barge for transporting goods on the Richelieu River. He later had shares in a steam-boat. He was involved in money-lending to residents in the Saint-Mathias area, and also engaged in land speculation. He was appointed commissioner in charge of construction of the Chambly Canal in 1832.

== Lower Canada Rebellion ==
The Assembly of the Six Counties, October 1837, held at Saint-Charles-sur-Richelieu

In 1837, events were moving towards rebellion against the British colonial government. Franchère was a member of the Patriote movement and a supporter of Louis-Joseph Papineau. He attended the major revolutionary meeting of the Assembly of the Six Counties in October 1837. The Assembly passed a very strong resolution condemning the British colonial government. Franchère later said that he had remonstrated with Papineau over the wording of the resolution, arguing that it went too far.

When the Lower Canada Rebellion broke out in November 1837, an arrest warrant issued against him, with a reward of £500. Franchère fled to the United States with two other merchants from Saint-Mathias, Louis Marchand and Eustache Soupras. He was granted a pardon by the Governor late in 1837. He was a director of La Banque du Peuple, which was suspected of having financed arms for the Rebellion.

== Province of Canada politics ==
Following the rebellion in Lower Canada, and the similar rebellion in 1837 in Upper Canada (now Ontario), the British government decided to merge the two provinces into a single province, as recommended by Lord Durham in the Durham Report. The Union Act, 1840, passed by the British Parliament, abolished the two provinces and their separate parliaments. It created the Province of Canada, with a single Parliament for the entire province, composed of an elected Legislative Assembly and an appointed Legislative Council. The Governor General initially retained a strong position in the government.

The first general elections for the Legislative Assembly of the Province of Canada were held in 1841. Franchère stood for election in the Rouville constituency, and campaigned against the union. He was narrowly defeated by Melchior-Alphonse de Salaberry, who supported the union. The election was marred by violence, with one person killed.

In 1843, there was a vacancy in the Rouville constituency. Franchère was a candidate in the by-election, and this time was elected. In the Assembly, he joined the French-Canadian Group of reformers, led by Louis-Hippolyte LaFontaine. He was re-elected in the 1844 general elections. He did not stand for election in the 1848 general elections.

== Later life and death ==
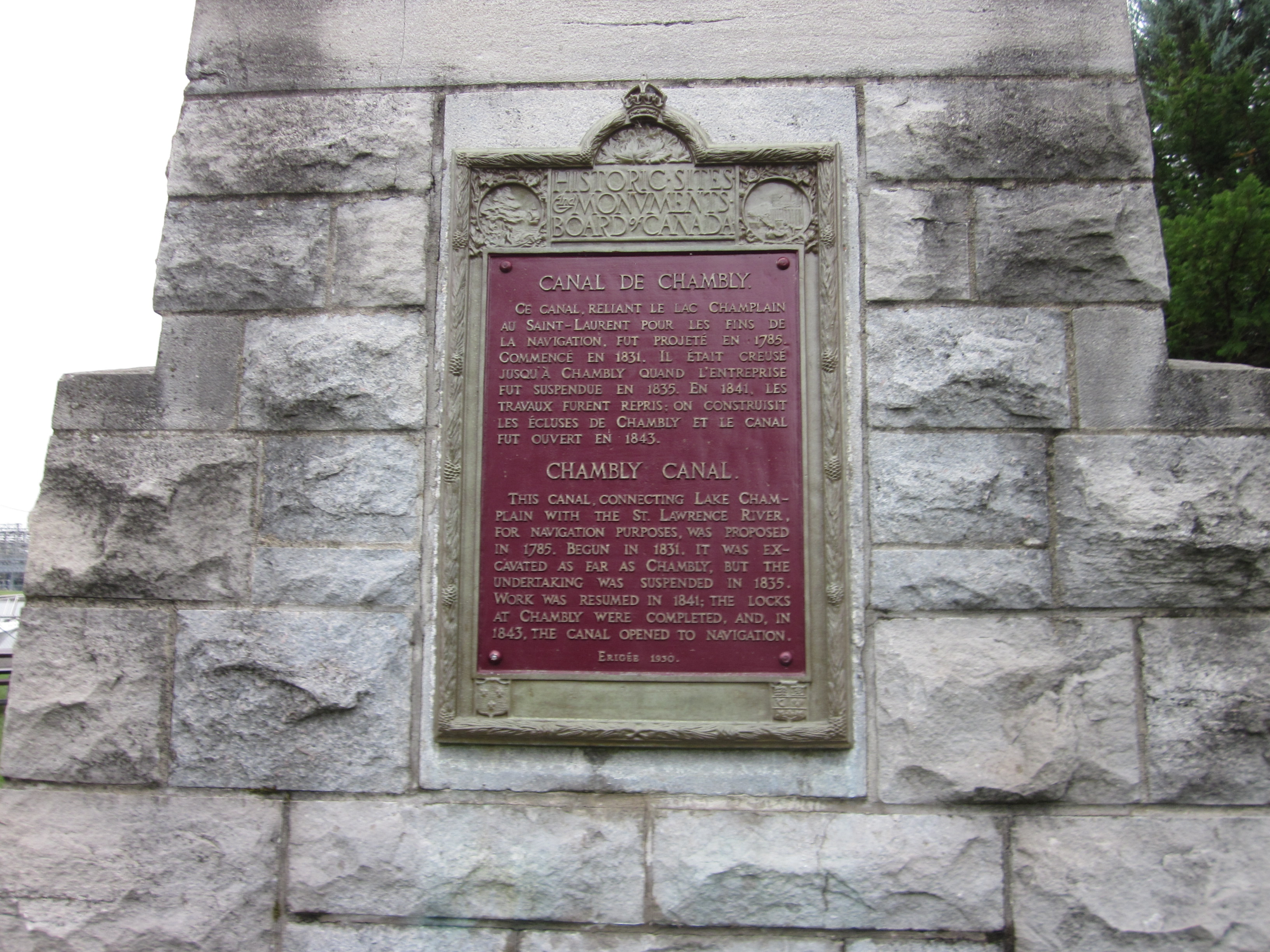
Monument to the Chambly Canal

Franchère was reinstated as commissioner for the Chambly Canal in 1840. He was appointed a justice of the peace in 1843, and elected the first mayor of Saint-Mathias in 1845. He continued his business activities.

Franchère died at Saint-Mathias in 1849. He left a large estate for his widow and five surviving children. The inventory of his property included two pianos and three portraits, of Pope Pius IX, Jacques Cartier, and Bishop Joseph-Octave Plessis. His widow reported that he had claimed £1,300 in compensation from the government for losses suffered during the Rebellion, and had received £837.

== See also ==
- 1st Parliament of the Province of Canada
- 2nd Parliament of the Province of Canada
