= Rémi-Séraphin Bourdages =

Canadian politician

Rémi-Séraphin Bourdages (December 25, 1799 – December 24, 1832) was a medical doctor and political figure in Lower Canada. He represented Rouville in the Legislative Assembly of Lower Canada from 1830 to 1832.

He was born Jean-David Bourdages in Saint-Denis, Lower Canada, the son of Louis Bourdages and Louise-Catherine Soupiran, and was educated at the Séminaire de Nicolet. Bourdages went on to study medicine in Quebec City and at New York University. He was authorized to practise medicine in Lower Canada in 1818 and settled in Sainte-Marie-de-Monnoir. He served as justice of the peace and was a member of the board of medical examiners for Montreal district. In 1832, he married Marguerite Franchère, the sister of Joseph and Timothée Franchère. Bourdages died in office in Saint-Denis at the age of 32.

His daughter Josephte married Joseph-Napoléon Poulin.
