= Jean-Baptiste-Melchior Hertel de Rouville =

Canadian politician

Jean-Baptiste-Melchior Hertel de Rouville (October 21, 1748 – November 30, 1817) was a seigneur and political figure in Lower Canada.

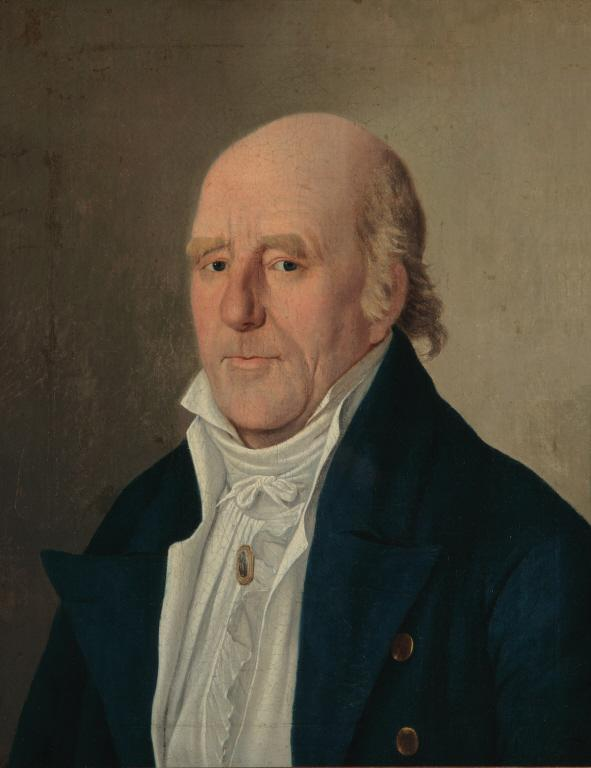
Jean-Baptiste-Melchior Hertel de Rouville

He was born in Trois-Rivières, the son of René-Ovide Hertel de Rouville, and served in the French Régiment du Languedoc. He returned to Quebec in 1772. He helped in the defence of Fort St. Johns (later Saint-Jean-sur-Richelieu) on the Richelieu River against the Americans in 1775; he was taken prisoner and released twenty months later. In 1783, he was named a justice of the peace for Montreal district. He settled at Chambly, on his father's seigneury, in 1789 and was named a colonel in the local militia the following year. After his father died in 1792, he received half of the seigneury of Rouville and part of Chambly; he later purchased the remainder of Rouville. Also in 1792, he was elected to the Legislative Assembly of Lower Canada for Bedford. In 1812, he was named to the Legislative Council.

He died in Chambly.

== Children ==
His son Jean-Baptiste-René inherited the seigneury of Rouville and part of Chambly from his father and also served in the legislative assembly. His daughter Marie-Anne-Julie, who had married Charles-Michel d'Irumberry de Salaberry, inherited land from the seigneury of Chambly.
