= Joseph Franchère =

Canadian politician

Joseph Franchère (August 15, 1785 – 1824 or later) was a political figure in Lower Canada. He represented Bedford in the Legislative Assembly of Lower Canada in 1820 and from 1822 to 1824.

He was born in Quebec City, the son of Antoine Franchère and Marie-Josephe Nicolas. Franchère was a captain in the militia during the War of 1812. He was first elected to the assembly in April 1820 and defeated by John Jones in the election that followed in July of the same year. The results of that election were subsequently declared invalid and Franchère was elected in a by-election held in 1822. He did not run for reelection in 1824.

His brother Timothée served in the Legislative Assembly of the Province of Canada. His sister Marguerite married Rémi-Séraphin Bourdages.
