= Ignace-Michel-Louis-Antoine d'Irumberry de Salaberry =

Canadian politician

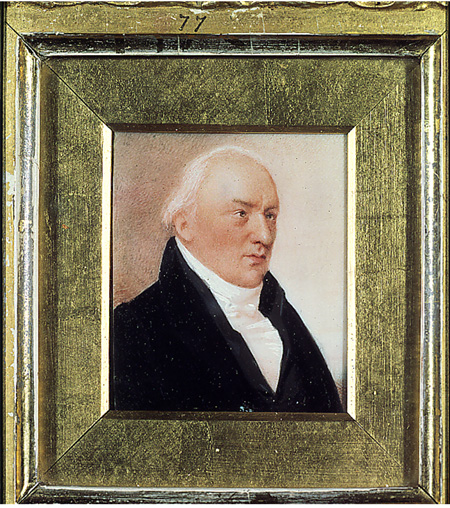
Louis-Antoine de Salaberry, seigneur de Beauport, by Anson Dickinson

Ignace-Michel-Louis-Antoine d'Irumberry de Salaberry (4 July 1752 – 22 March 1828) was the son of Michel de Sallaberry and the first member of the family to develop permanent roots in Canada. He had stayed on when his parents returned to France and, as an adult, became part of the seigneurial gentry of Lower Canada. He was the father of Charles de Salaberry.

Salaberry formed a friendship with Prince Edward Augustus, a son of George III, and he and his family benefited greatly from the Prince's patronage.

In the first election of 1792 for the Legislative Assembly of Lower Canada, he ran, and won, in two ridings. He chose to represent Dorchester, where the other successful candidate was Gabriel-Elzéar Taschereau.

His position and the royal patronage netted him a number of appointments including one to the Legislative Council of Lower Canada in 1817.
