= Wade Hampton I =

American military officer, planter, and politician (1750–1835)

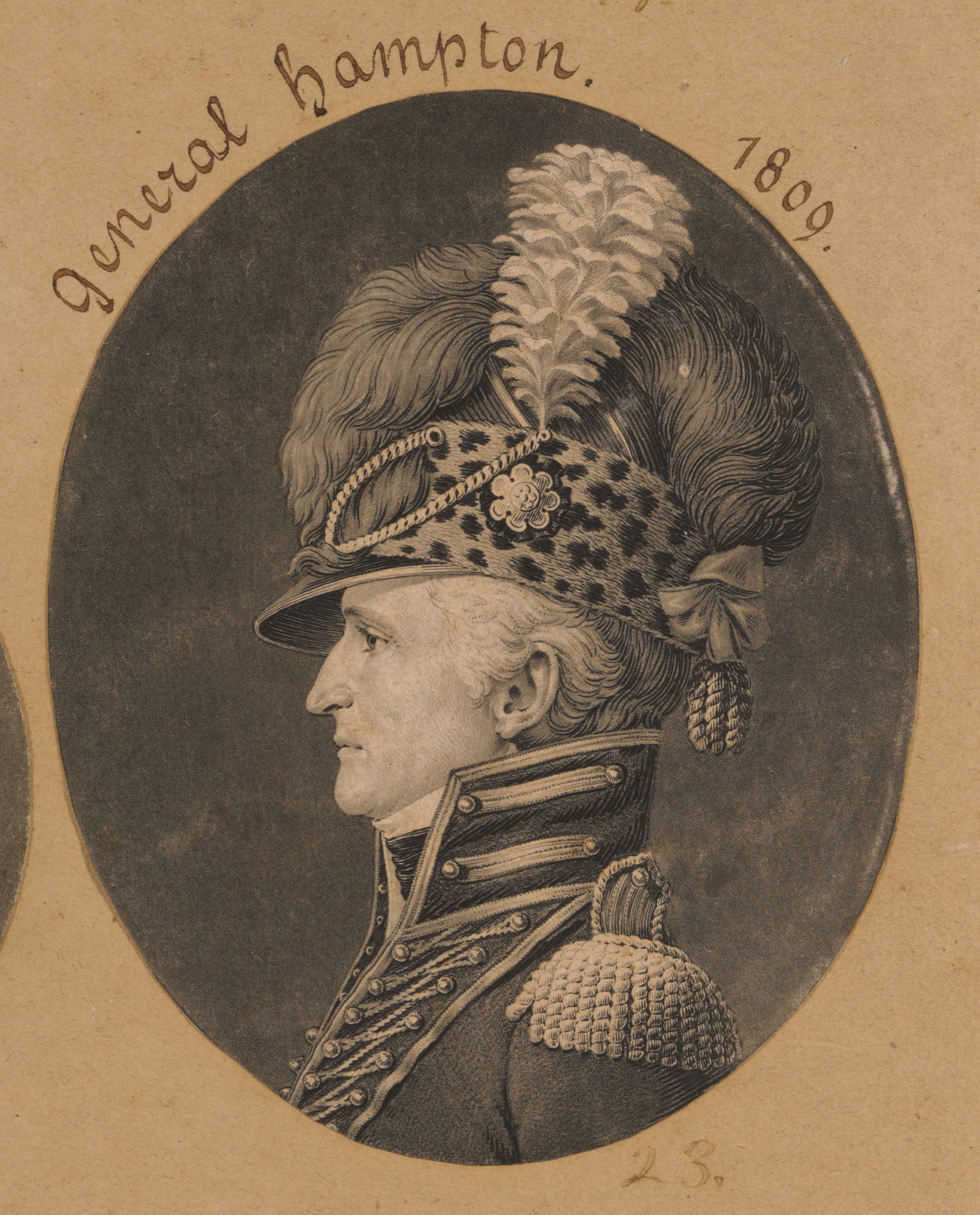
- Portrait by Charles Balthazar Julien Févret de Saint-Mémin, 1809

Member of the U.S. House of Representatives from South Carolina
- In office March 4, 1803 – March 3, 1805
- Preceded by: Richard Winn
- Succeeded by: O'Brien Smith
- Constituency: 4th district
- In office March 4, 1795 – March 3, 1797
- Preceded by: John Hunter
- Succeeded by: John Rutledge Jr.
- Constituency: 2nd district

Personal details
- Born: c. 1750 Colony of Virginia, British America
- Died: February 4, 1835 (aged 84–85) Columbia, South Carolina, U.S.
- Party: Democratic-Republican
- Relations: Wade Hampton III (grandson)
- Children: Wade Hampton II

Military service
- Allegiance: United States
- Branch/service: Continental Army; United States Army
- Years of service: 1777–1781; 1808–1814
- Rank: Major general
- Unit: 2nd South Carolina Regiment
- Commands: Regiment of Light Dragoons
- Battles/wars: American Revolutionary War; 1811 German Coast uprising; War of 1812; Battle of the Chateauguay

Major General Wade Hampton (c. 1750 – February 4, 1835) was an American military officer, planter, and politician who served in the American Revolutionary War and War of 1812. Sitting in the United States Congress for two terms, Hampton was one of the wealthiest planters and largest slaveowners in the United States at the time of his death. In addition to suppressing the 1811 German Coast uprising, a slave rebellion in Louisiana, he is also known for leading American forces to defeat at the 1813 Battle of the Chateauguay.

== Early life ==
Sources vary on Hampton's exact birth year, listing it as 1751, 1752, or 1754. He was the scion of the politically important Hampton family, which was influential in South Carolina state politics almost into the 20th century. His second great-grandfather Thomas Hampton (1623–1690) was born in England before moving to the English colony of Virginia. Thomas Hampton's father, William, a wool merchant, sailed from England and appears on the 1618 passenger list of the Bona Novo. The ship was blown off course and arrived in Newfoundland. It would arrive in Jamestown the following year, 1619. He would send for his wife and three children to arrive in Jamestown in 1620.

=== Military career ===
Hampton served in the American Revolutionary War as a captain in the 2nd South Carolina Regiment (1777–1781) and as the lieutenant colonel of a South Carolina volunteer cavalry regiment. He was a Democratic-Republican member of Congress for South Carolina from 1795 to 1797 and from 1803 to 1805, and a presidential elector in 1800. He was appointed to the U.S. Army as colonel of Regiment of Light Dragoons in October 1808, and was promoted to brigadier general in February 1809, appointed as the top military officer in the Territory of Orleans. He used the U.S. military presence in New Orleans to suppress the 1811 German Coast uprising, a slave rebellion which he believed was a Spanish plot. In the same year, he purchased The Houmas, a sugar plantation in Ascension Parish, Louisiana. This may have been a gift for his daughter and son-in-law, as the son-in-law was managing the plantation by 1825.

During the War of 1812, Hampton was promoted to major general on March 2, 1813, and assumed overall command of American forces around Lake Champlain on July 4. On September 19 he led a force of 2,600 army regulars out of Burlington, Vermont, and invaded Lower Canada in October as part of a wider American attempt to capture Montreal. However Hampton's army was defeated at the Battle of the Chateauguay on October 26; having submitted his resignation a day earlier, Hampton withdrew his army back to American soil and after the resignation was accepted on April 6, 1814, he returned to South Carolina.

=== Later life and death ===
Thereafter, he acquired a large fortune through land speculation. Hampton had a mansion, now known as the Hampton-Preston House, which is listed on the National Register of Historic Places, in Columbia, South Carolina. At his death in the 1830s, it was said that he was the wealthiest planter in the U.S. and possessed some 3,000 slaves amongst his holdings. In his abolitionist compendium American Slavery as It Is, Theodore Weld cites a witness who heard him boasting that he killed some of his slaves for a nutritional experiment. The witness represents Hampton's words as: "[T]hey died like rotten sheep!!" Hampton was interred in the churchyard at Trinity Episcopal Church in Columbia, South Carolina's capital city. His son Wade Hampton II and grandson Wade Hampton III also became prominent in South Carolina social and political circles.

== Legacy ==
Fort Hampton, a fort in Alabama, was named for General Hampton.

== See also ==
- List of slave owners

== Notes ==
U.S. House of Representatives
Preceded by John Hunter	Member of the U.S. House of Representatives from South Carolina's 2nd congressional district 1795-1797	Succeeded by John Rutledge, Jr.
Preceded by Richard Winn	Member of the U.S. House of Representatives from South Carolina's 4th congressional district 1803-1805	Succeeded by O'Brien Smith
