= William Walker (Quebec politician) =

Canadian lawyer and politician

Member of the Legislative Assembly of the Province of Canada for Rouville
- In office 1842–1843

Personal details
- Born: August 8, 1797
- Died: April 8, 1844 (aged 46)
- Occupation: lawyer, politician

William Walker (August 8, 1797 – April 8, 1844) was a Quebec lawyer and political figure.

He articled in law with Michael O'Sullivan and Charles Richard Ogden, was admitted to the bar in 1819 and set up practice in Montreal. Although loyal to the British authorities, following the Lower Canada Rebellion, he served as lawyer for several Patriotes who had been imprisoned. Walker originally supported the union of Upper and Lower Canada but later became editor of the Canada Times, a newspaper that supported responsible government and opposed the union. He was elected to the Legislative Assembly of the Province of Canada for Rouville in an 1842 by-election; he resigned due to illness in 1843 and died in Montreal in 1844.
