= Michel de Sallaberry =

Michel de Salaberry
- Born: July 4, 1704 parish of Saint-Vincent, Ciboure (department of Pyrénées-Atlantiques), France
- Died: November 27, 1768 (aged 64); Salles near La Rochelle, France
- Occupations: naval officer, shipowner
- Children: Ignace-Michel-Louis-Antoine

Michel de Salaberry (July 4, 1704 – November 27, 1768) enrolled in the French Merchant Navy at a very young age. He was a naval officer and a shipowner from the d' Irumberry de Salaberry family in the Basque area of France. His arrival in Quebec according to the family historical account, was in 1735 he was living there and by the next year he owned his own ship and was soon a force in commercial shipping. He married in Quebec, to Marie de Villeray and she had 2 daughters with him. He found living on shore too boring so returned to his ship. Michel returned to France, and by 1745 had made La Rochelle his home port. He offered his services to the King, and was entrusted with a perilous mission - to deliver orders to the Marquis of Beauharnais, at that time the Governor of Nouvelle France. During this journey, his ship was struck by a terrible storm, and were forced to change course, arriving on Martinique, where they stayed for several weeks to repair the ship. On April 20, 1745, they again headed out to sea, and arrived in Quebec on the 6th of June. Following his delivery to Quebec, de Salaberry was asked to find an observation post where he could watch for British ships in the St. Lawrence River, which might threaten the colony. After 2 months of surveillance, he spotted the British and quickly sailed to Quebec to provide the information to the Governor. Because of the success of his mission, the Governor recommended him to the French Minister, underlining the service rendered. The King rewarded de Salaberry with a naval office. In 1750, Michel married for the second time, to Madelaine Loiuse, daughter of Ignace Juchereau Duchesnay, who was the Seigneur de Beauport. In 1752 de Salaberry was given command of the vessel Le Chariot Royale, and was responsible to deliver messages between Ile Royale and the King. In 1758, de Salaberry was in command of the naval frigate La Fidèle, and sailed to Louisbourg, which was surrounded by many British ships. He was ordered to sink his ship at the mouth of the harbour, to block the entrance from the British ships. As he ordered the scuttles to be pulled, he stood on the deck and shouted to the British captains nearby, "Je commande La Fidèle, et fidèle je reste!" (Which means, "I command The Faithful, and I stay faithful.")

He was captured by the English, and taken to prison in England.

He retired after the war and in 1760, returned to France. His son, Ignace-Michel-Louis-Antoine stayed in Canada and became the head of the Canadian branch of the family of Irumberry de Salaberry.

Michel's importance to history, and Canadian history in particular, is the forging of ties between France and New France. Through participation in important events in Canada and his marriage into a prominent family, he set in motion a New World lineage that had a significant impact on Canada.
