= Adine =

Adine may refer to:

== People ==
- Adine Fafard-Drolet (1876–1963), Canadian soprano
- Adine Gemberg (1858-1902), German writer, novel and novella author, journalist and feminist social critic
- Adine Masson, French tennis player
- Adine Riom (1818–1899), French writer
- Adine Wilson (born 1979), New Zealand netball representative

== Places ==
- Adine, Gaiole in Chianti, Italy
