= San San =

San San or San san may refer to:

- San San, Portland, Jamaica, a town in the parish of Portland in Jamaica
- San San River, a river of Panama
- San San (horse), an American-bred Thoroughbred racehorse
- San san (Go), a term in the board game Go

== See also ==
- San Sano, a village in Tuscany, Italy
- Sansan (disambiguation)
