= Castagnoli =

Castagnoli is an Italian surname. Notable people with the surname include:

- Claudio Castagnoli (born 1980), Swiss professional wrestler
- Ferdinando Castagnoli (1917–1988), Italian topographer
- Giulio Castagnoli (born 1958), Italian composer
- Giuseppe Castagnoli (1754–1832), Italian painter
- Paola Ricciardi-Castagnoli (born 1948), Italian immunologist
- Ubaldo Castagnoli (1902–1982), Italian architect and engineer

== See also ==
- Castagnoli, Gaiole in Chianti, village in Tuscany
