= San Martino al Vento =

- Frazione
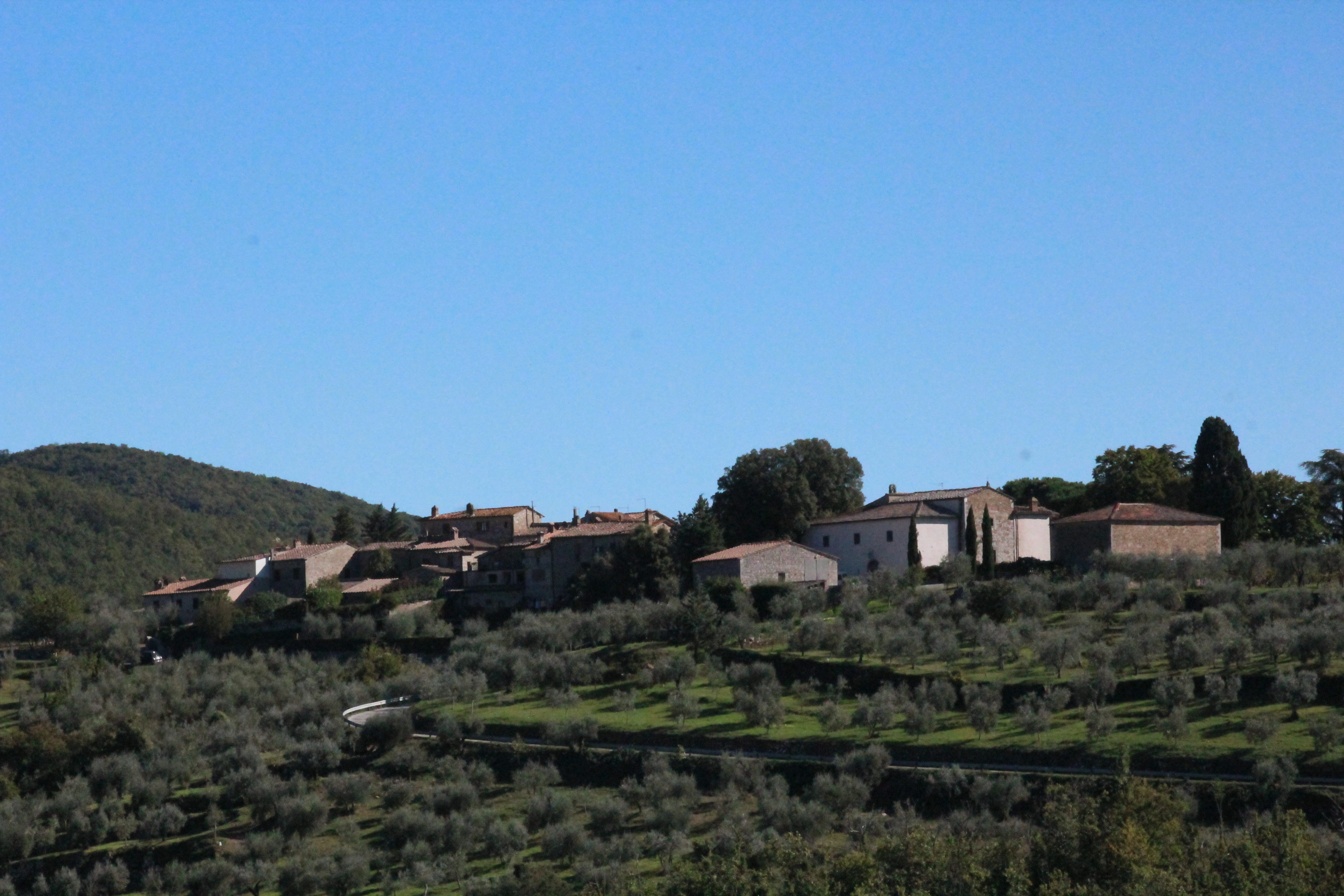
- View of San Martino al Vento

- Location of San Martino al Vento in Italy
- Coordinates: 43°26′13″N 11°26′52″E
- Country: Italy
- Region: Tuscany
- Province: Siena (SI)
- Comune: Gaiole in Chianti
- Elevation: 485 m (1,591 ft)

Population (2001)
  - Total: 41
- Time zone: UTC+1 (CET)
  - Summer (DST): UTC+2 (CEST)

San Martino al Vento is a village in Tuscany, central Italy, administratively a frazione of the comune of Gaiole in Chianti, province of Siena. At the time of the 2001 census its population was 41.

San Martino al Vento is about 28 km from Siena and 6 km from Gaiole in Chianti.
