= Monti, Gaiole in Chianti =

Monti
- Frazione
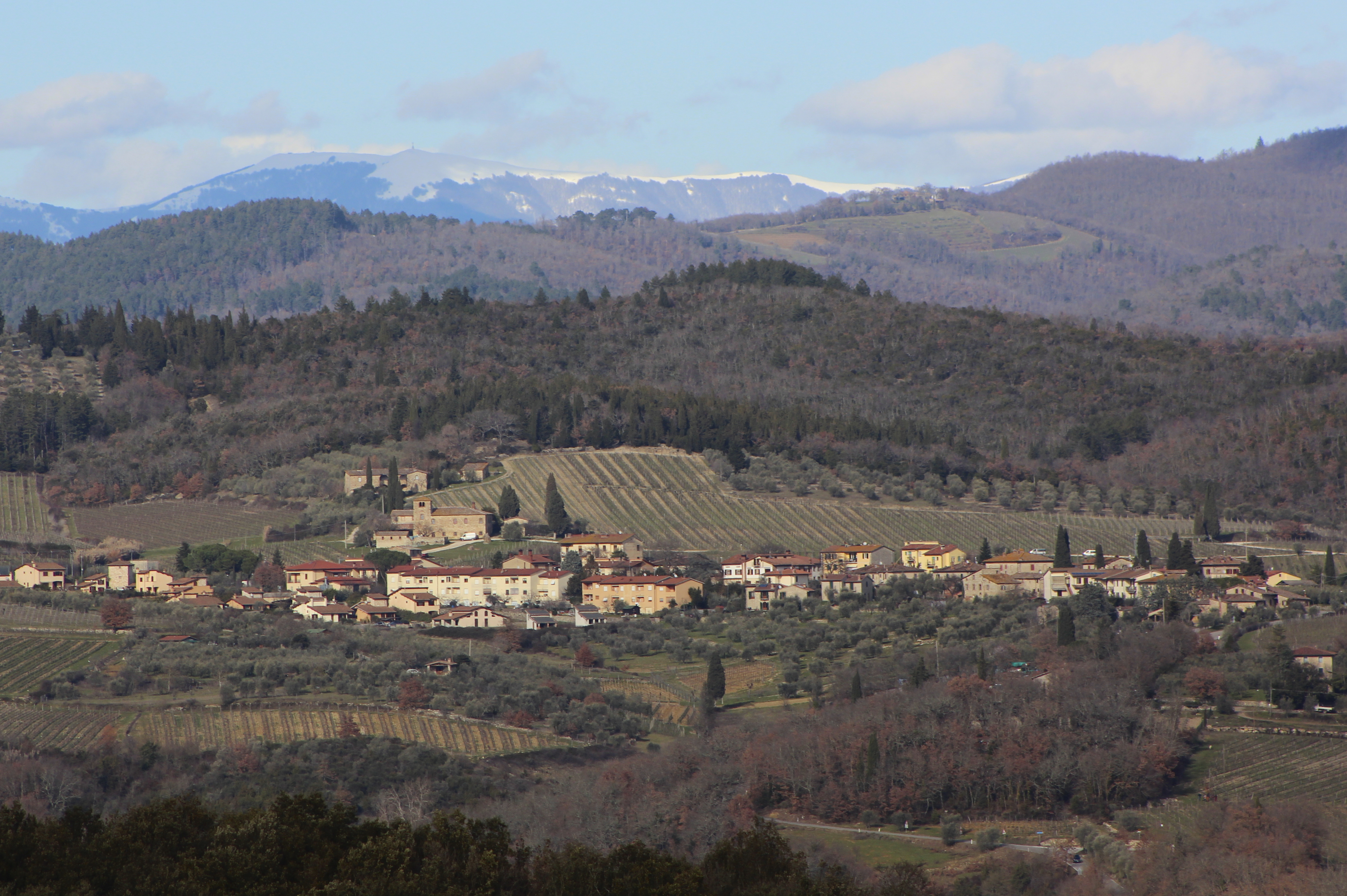
- View of Monti

- Location of Monti in Italy
- Coordinates: 43°24′11″N 11°25′29″E
- Country: Italy
- Region: Tuscany
- Province: Siena (SI)
- Comune: Gaiole in Chianti
- Elevation: 280 m (920 ft)

Population (2011)
  - Total: 277
- Demonym: Sammarcellinesi
- Time zone: UTC+1 (CET)
  - Summer (DST): UTC+2 (CEST)

Monti is a village in Tuscany, central Italy, administratively a frazione of the comune of Gaiole in Chianti, province of Siena. At the time of the 2001 census its population was 241.

== Churches and chapels ==
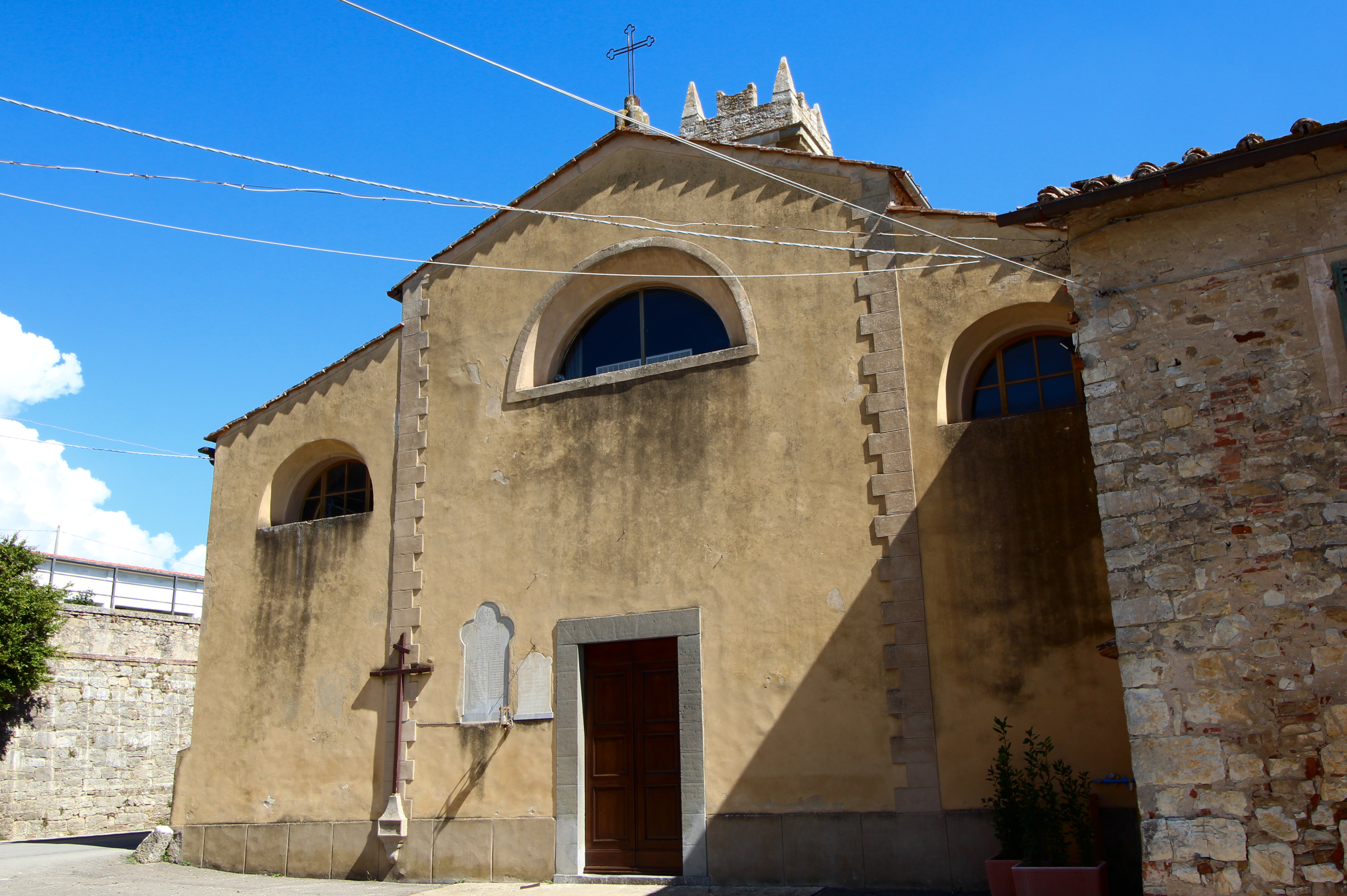
Pieve di San Marcellino

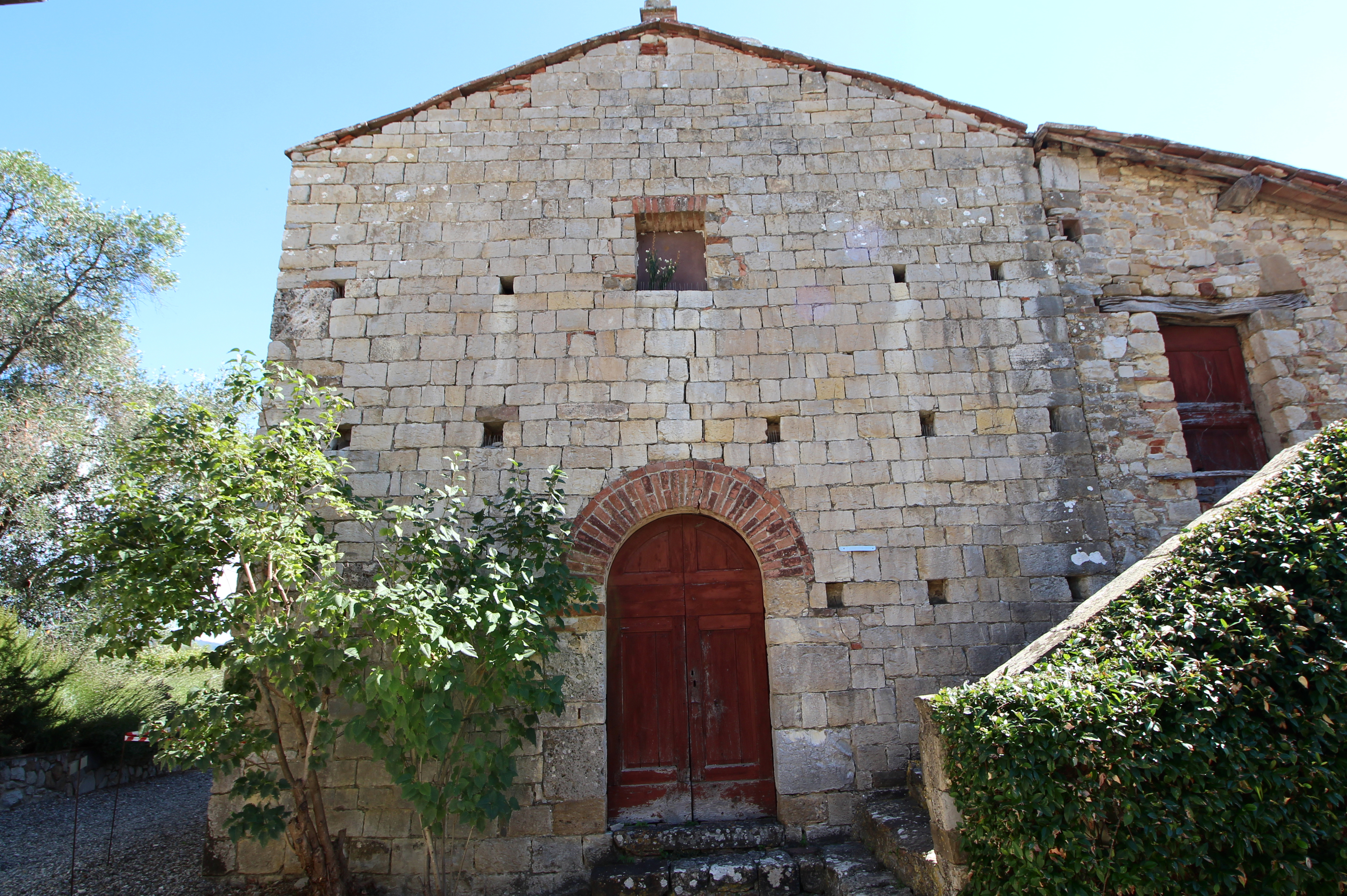
The church of San Marcellino in Colle

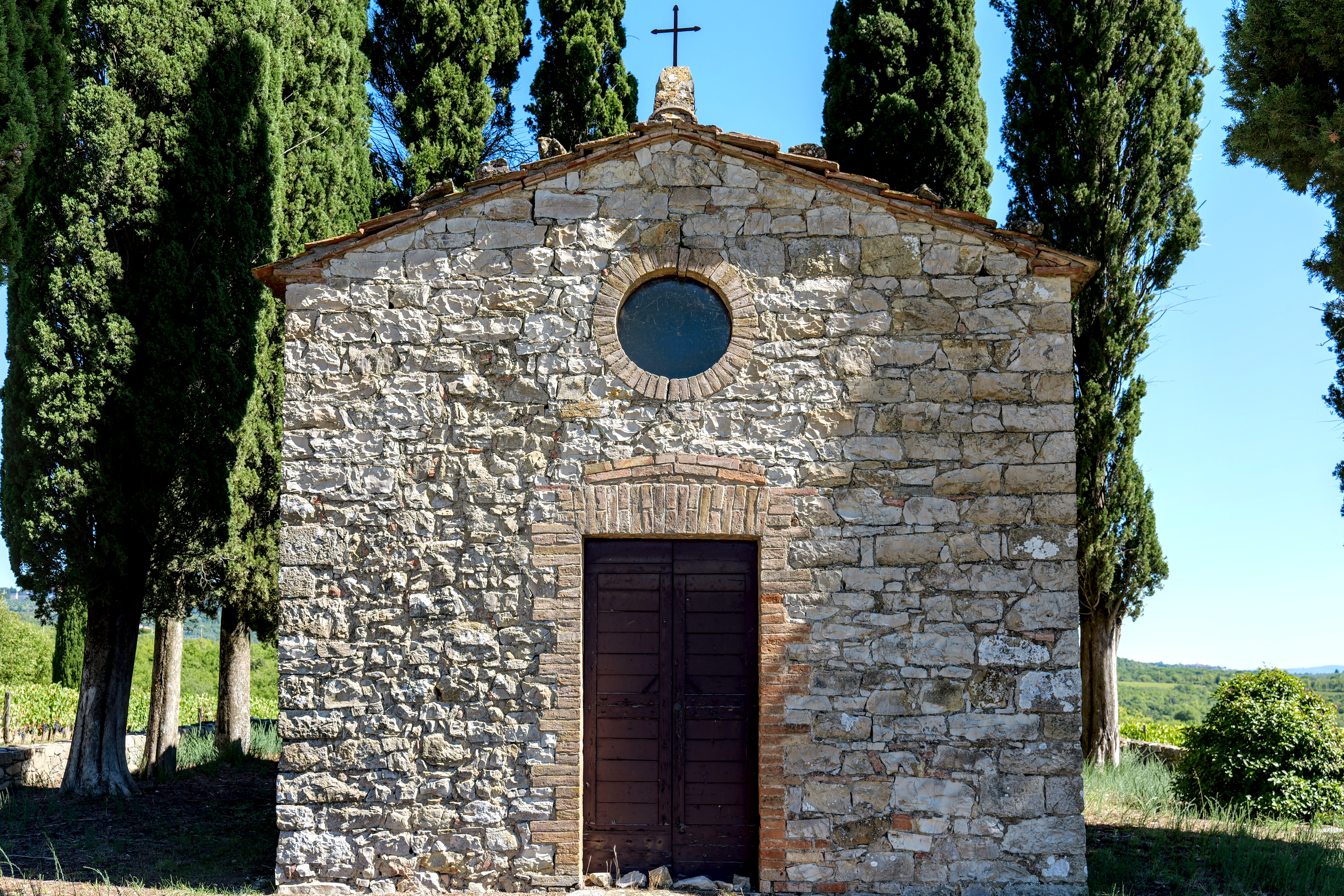
The church of Santa Lucia

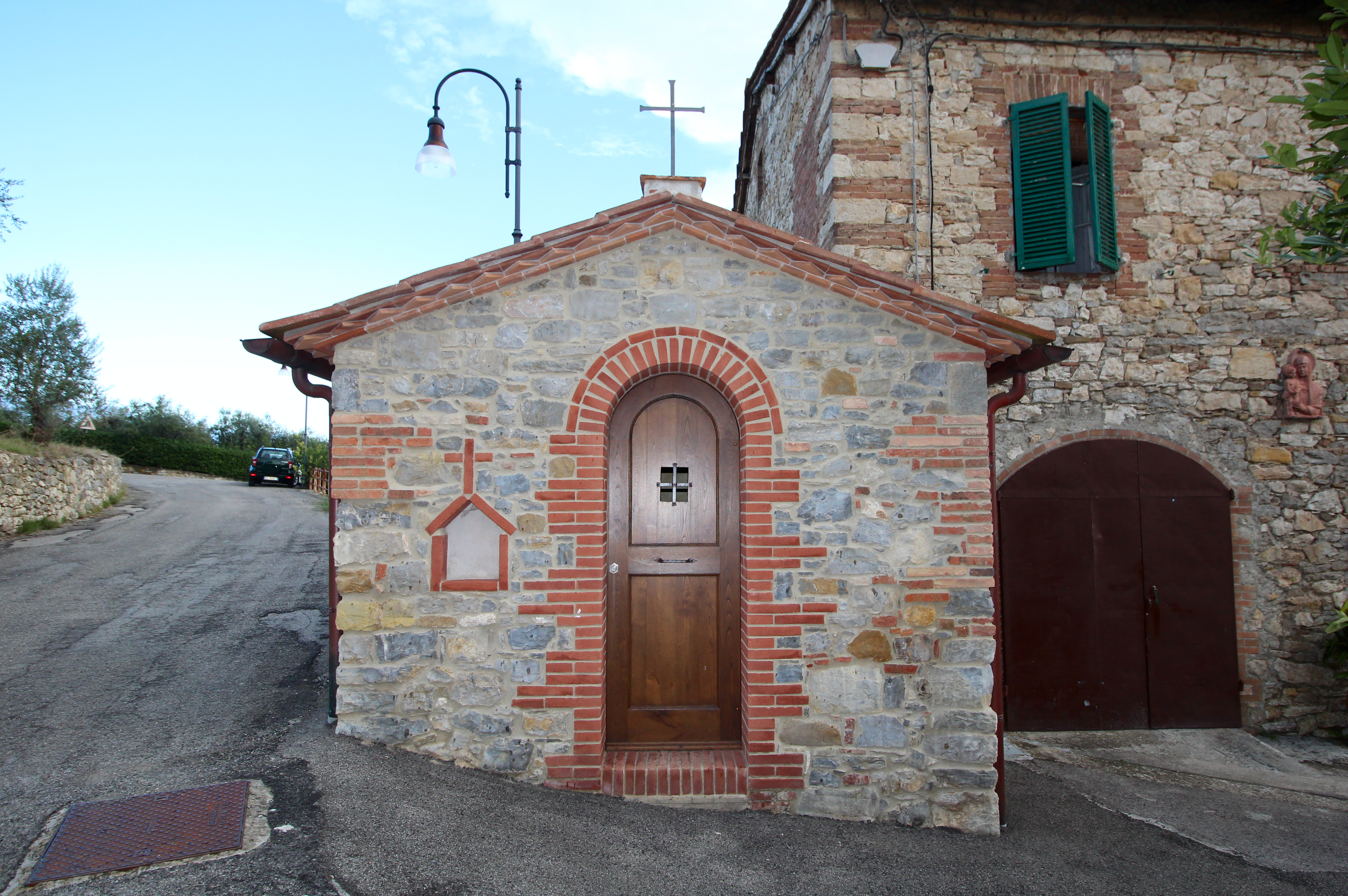
The chapel in Monti di Sotto
