= Gaiole in Chianti =

- Comune
- Comune di Gaiole in Chianti
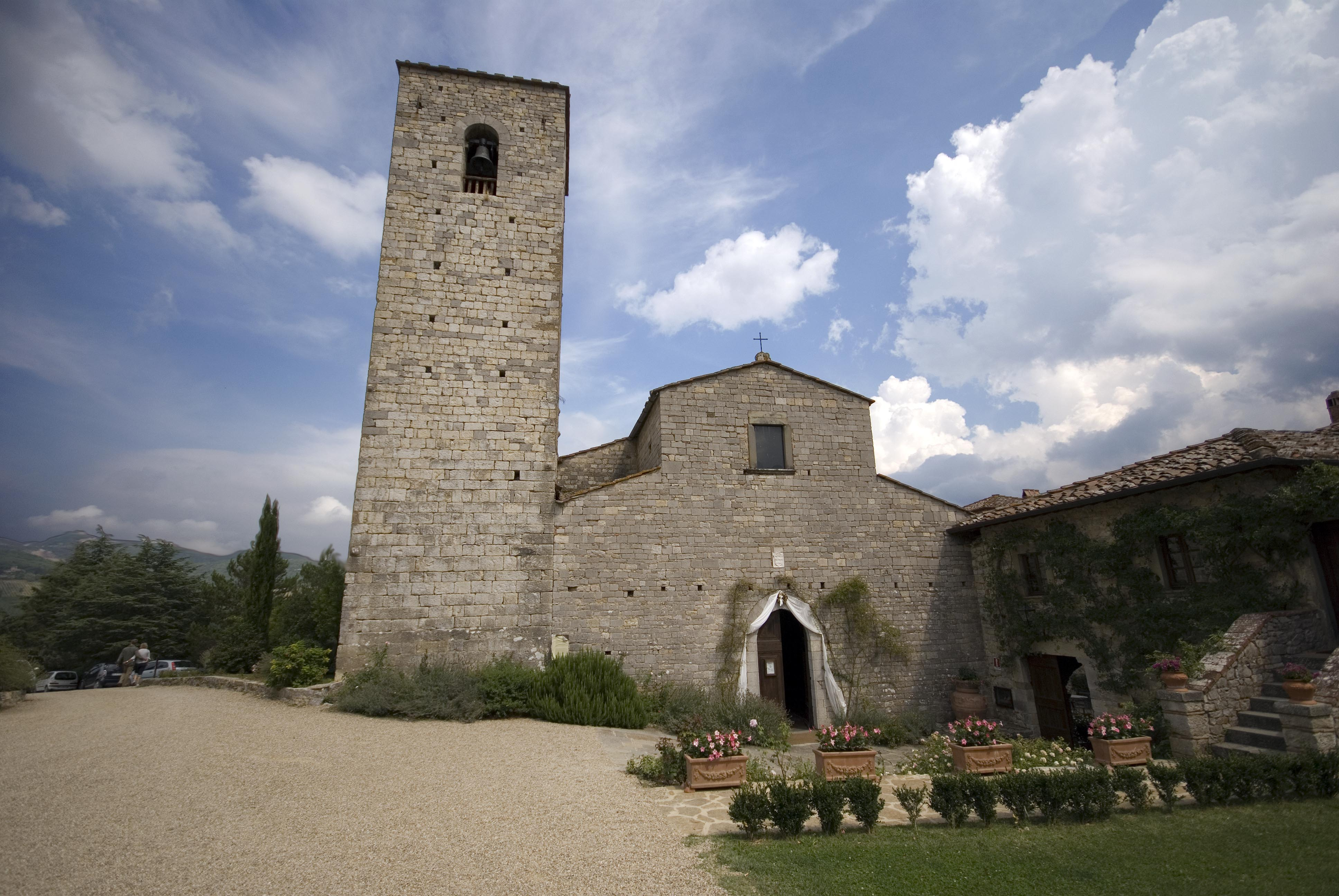
- Pieve of Santa Maria in Spaltenna

- Coat of arms

- Location within Italy Location within Tuscany
- Coordinates: 43°28′N 11°26′E
- Country: Italy
- Region: Tuscany
- Province: Siena (SI)
- Frazioni: Adine, Ama, Barbischio, Castagnoli, Fietri, Galenda, Il Colle, Lecchi in Chianti, Lucignano in Chianti, Montegrossi, Monti, Nusenna, Poggio San Polo, Rietine, San Giusto alle Monache, San Martino al Vento, San Regolo, San Sano, San Vincenti, Starda, Vertine

Government
  - Mayor: Michele Pescini

Area
  - Total: 129.0 km^{2} (49.8 sq mi)
- Elevation: 360 m (1,180 ft)

Population (31 August 2017)
  - Total: 2,756
  - Density: 21.36/km^{2} (55.33/sq mi)
- Demonym: Gaiolesi
- Time zone: UTC+1 (CET)
  - Summer (DST): UTC+2 (CEST)
- Postal code: 53013
- Dialing code: 0577
- Website: Official website

Gaiole in Chianti is a comune (municipality) in the Province of Siena in the Italian region Tuscany, located about 40 kilometres (25 mi) southeast of Florence and about 15 kilometres (9 mi) northeast of Siena. Forbes named it number one on its list of "Europe's Most Idyllic Places To Live."

Each year in March, a professional bicycle race is held, known as Strade Bianche in reference to the white gravel roads of the Siena region. In October there is a public event, using many of the same roads, for vintage bicycle enthusiasts known as L'Eroica. This starts and finishes in Gaiole including a full week of festivities.

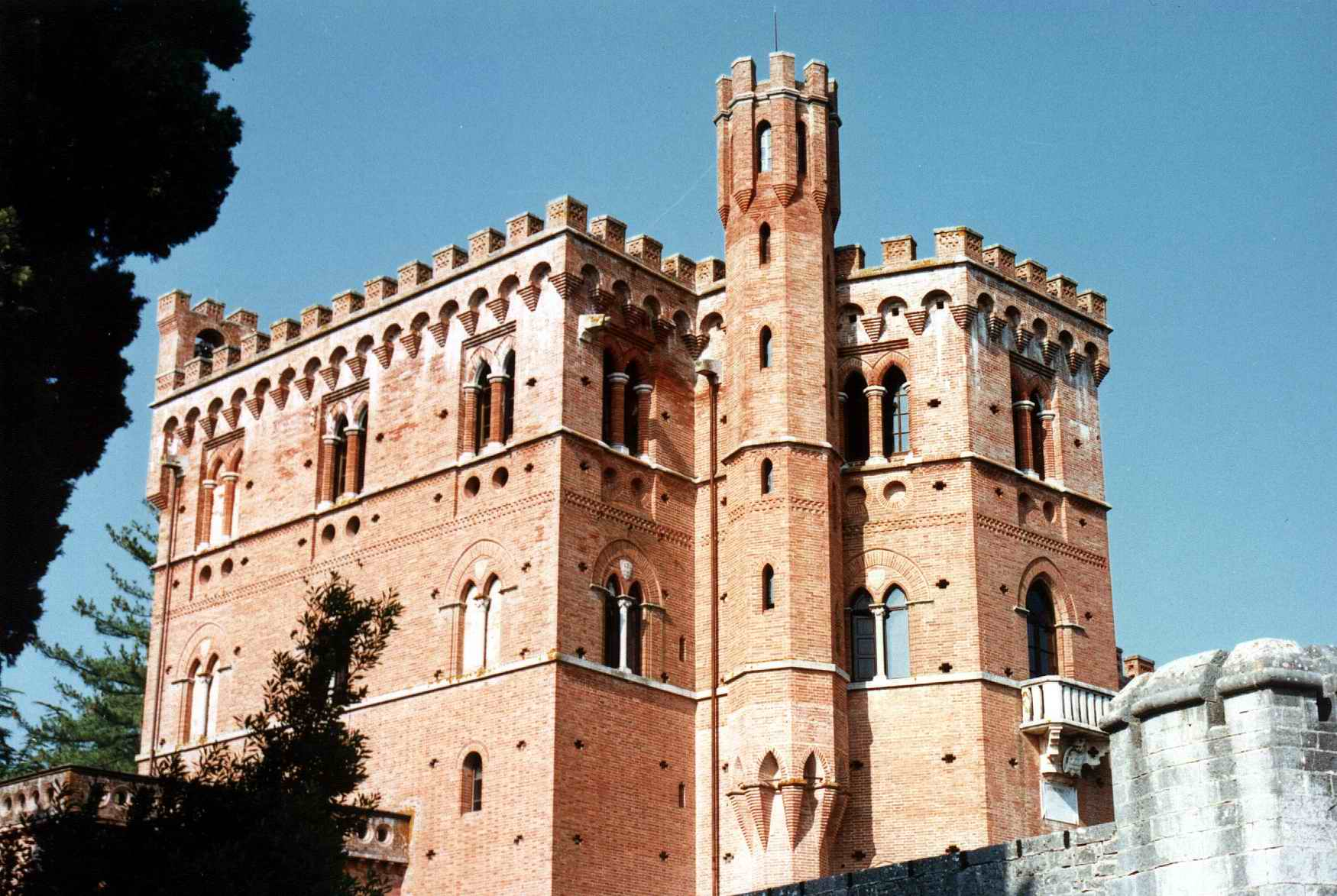
Castello di Brolio

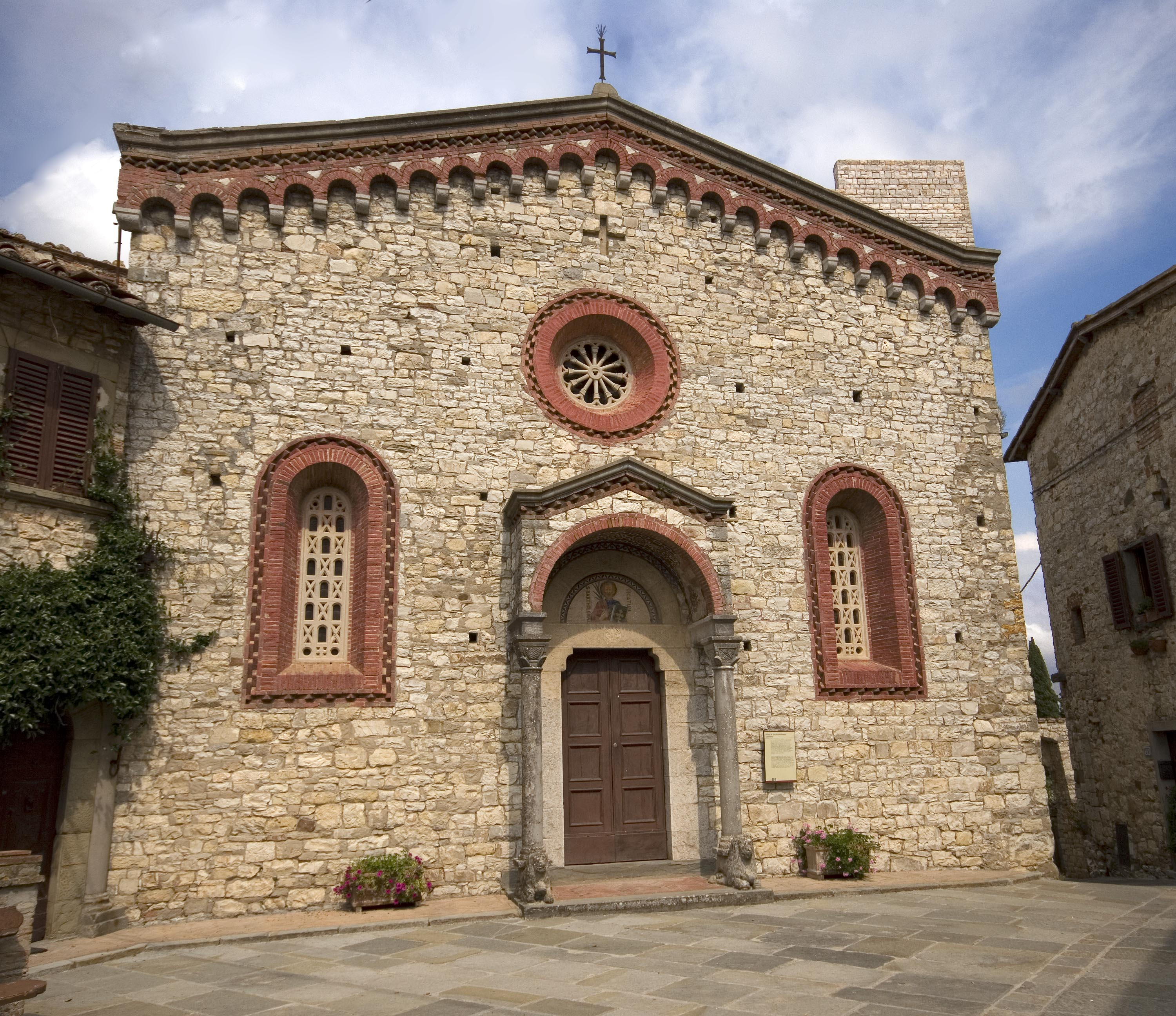
Pieve of San Bartolomeo a Vertine

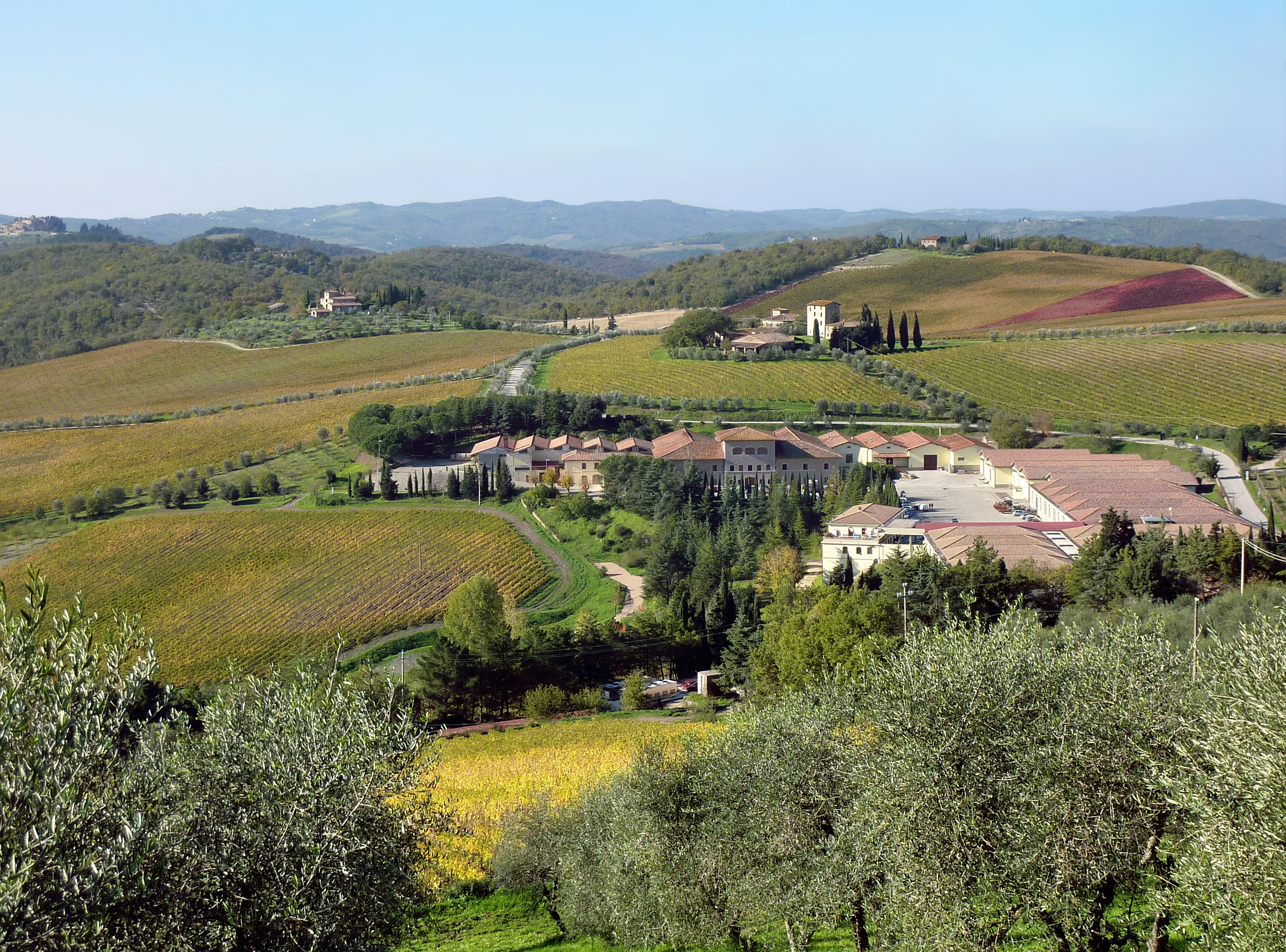
Wine-growing holding

== Main sights ==
- Castello di Brolio castle and vineyard (11th century).
- Abbey of Coltibuono
- Pieve of San Marcellino, of medieval origin. It was mostly rebuilt in the 14th century.
- Pieve of San Polo Rosso, dating from the 12th century. It is now part of a 14th-century defensive structure. The interior has a nave with two aisles and an apse.
- Pieve of San Giusto in Salcio
- Romanesque Pieve of Santa Maria a Spaltenna, known from 1030.
- Pieve of San Bartolomeo a Vertine (11th century). It was once home of an early work by Simone Martini and a triptych by Bicci di Lorenzo, now in the Siena Pinacoteca. Some fragmentary medieval frescoes still remain on exhibit today.
- Pieve of San Vincenti.
- Castello di Tornano castle and vineyard.

== People ==
- Bettino Ricasoli (1809–1880), Prime Minister of the Kingdom of Italy, who created the Chianti recipe of 70% Sangiovese, 15% Canaiolo, and 15% Malvasia bianca

== See also ==
- History of Chianti
