= Nusenna =

- Frazione
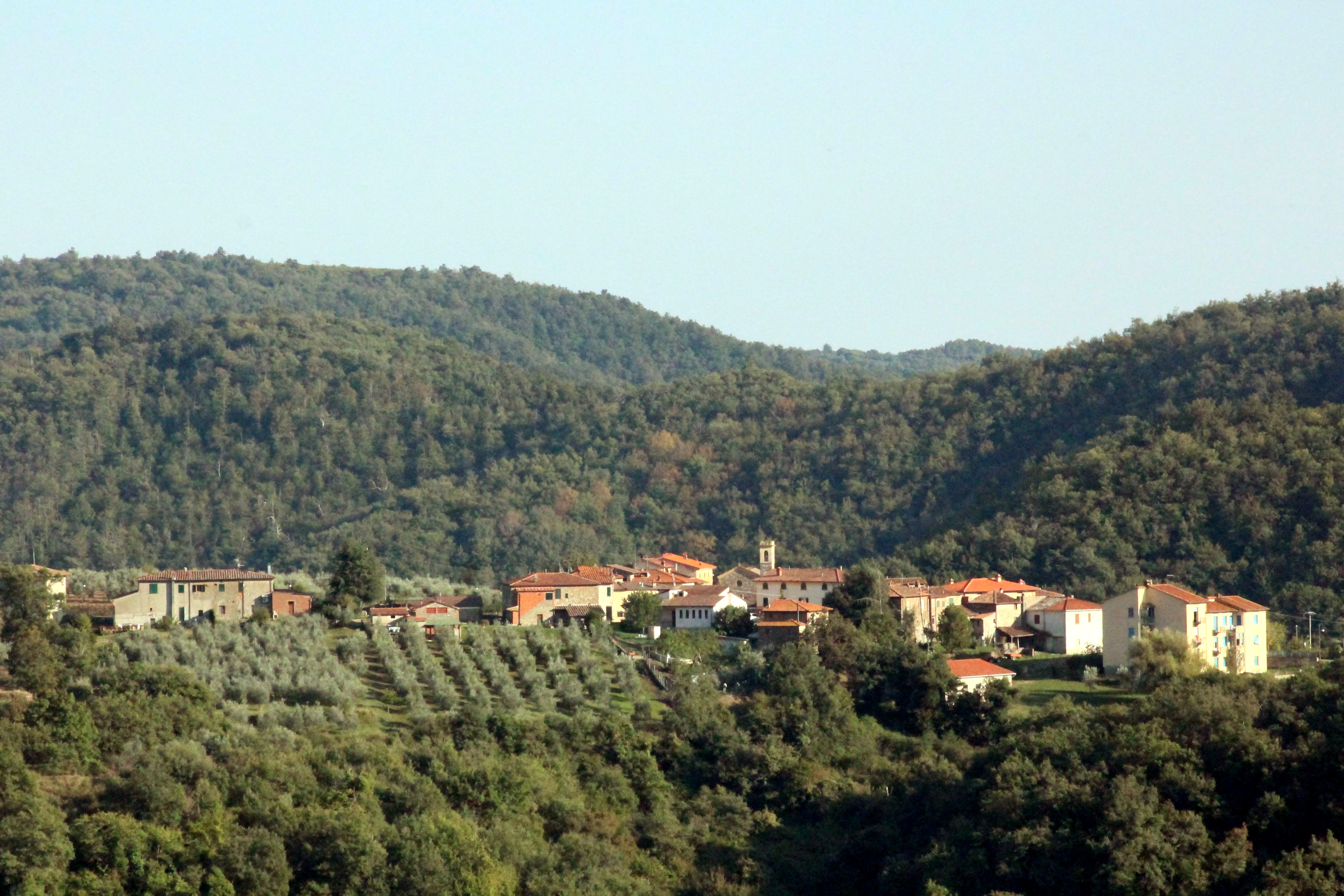
- View of Nusenna

- Location of Nusenna in Italy
- Coordinates: 43°27′3″N 11°31′55″E
- Country: Italy
- Region: Tuscany
- Province: Siena (SI)
- Comune: Gaiole in Chianti
- Elevation: 561 m (1,841 ft)

Population (2011)
  - Total: 41
- Demonym: Nusennesi
- Time zone: UTC+1 (CET)
  - Summer (DST): UTC+2 (CEST)

Nusenna is a village in Tuscany, central Italy, administratively a frazione of the comune of Gaiole in Chianti, province of Siena. At the time of the 2001 census its population was 36.

Nusenna is about 35 km from Siena and 14 km from Gaiole in Chianti.
