= Lucignano in Chianti =

- Frazione
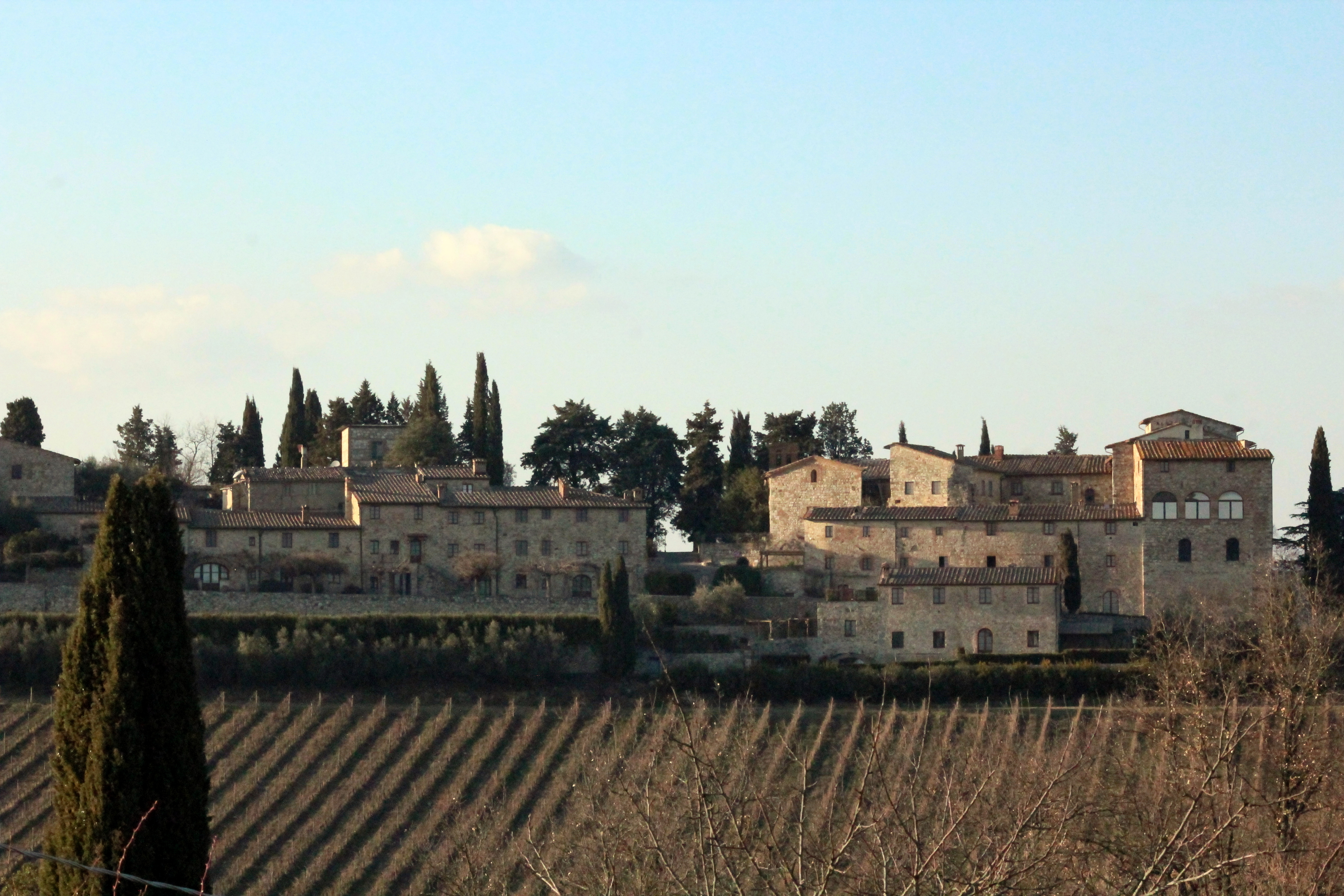
- View of Lucignano in Chianti

- Location of Lucignano in Chianti in Italy
- Coordinates: 43°22′48″N 11°25′40″E
- Country: Italy
- Region: Tuscany
- Province: Siena (SI)
- Comune: Gaiole in Chianti
- Elevation: 619 m (2,031 ft)

Population (2011)
  - Total: 12
- Demonym: Lucignanesi
- Time zone: UTC+1 (CET)
  - Summer (DST): UTC+2 (CEST)

Lucignano in Chianti is a village in Tuscany, central Italy, administratively a frazione of the comune of Gaiole in Chianti, province of Siena. At the time of the 2001 census its population was 14.
