= Poggio San Polo =

- Frazione
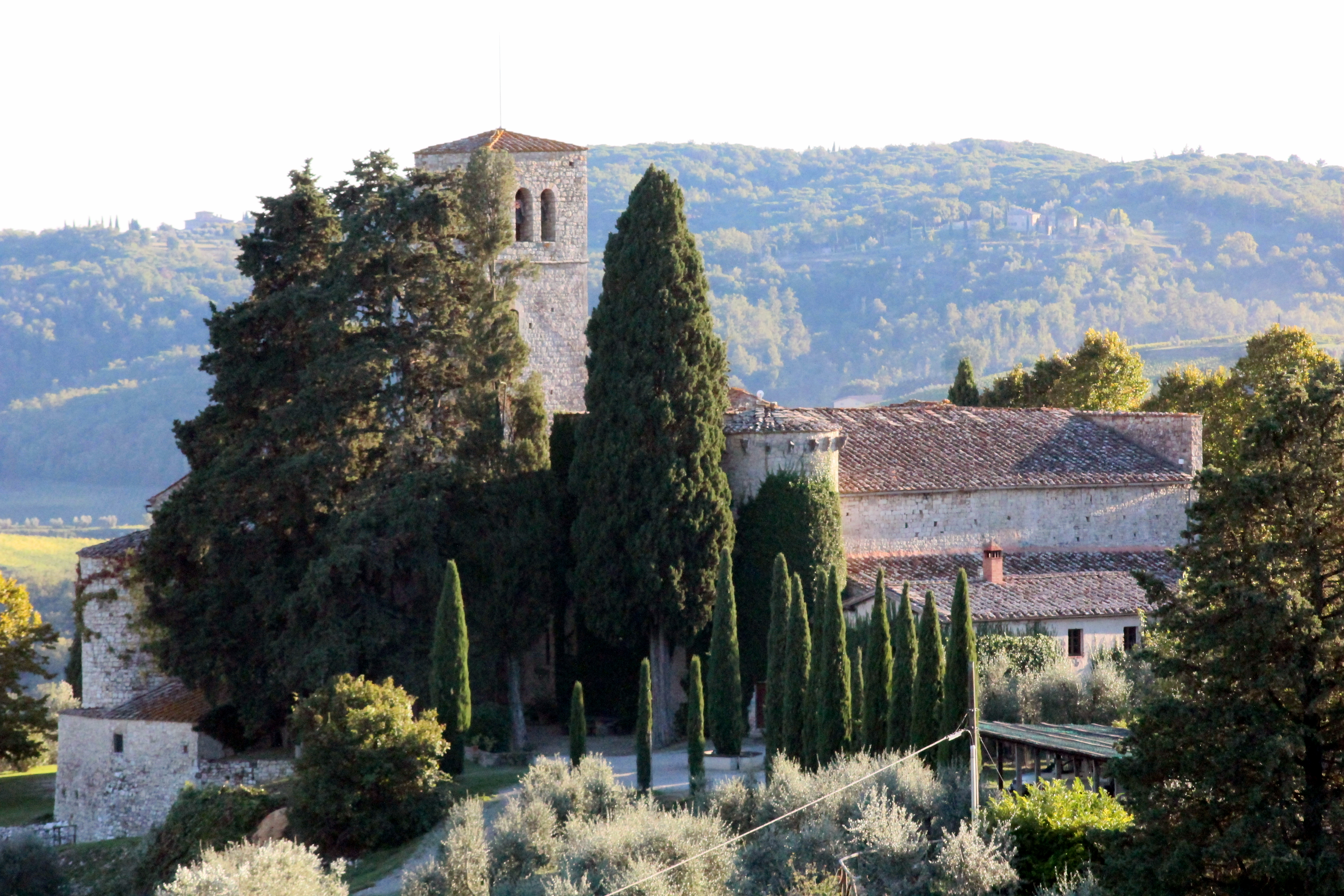

- Location of Poggio San Polo in Italy
- Coordinates: 43°26′48″N 11°22′41″E
- Country: Italy
- Region: Tuscany
- Province: Siena (SI)
- Comune: Gaiole in Chianti
- Elevation: 527 m (1,729 ft)

Population (2011)
  - Total: 26
- Time zone: UTC+1 (CET)
  - Summer (DST): UTC+2 (CEST)

Poggio San Polo is a village in Tuscany, central Italy, administratively a frazione of the comune of Gaiole in Chianti, province of Siena. At the time of the 2001 census its population was 29.
