= Vertine, Gaiole in Chianti =

Vertine
- Frazione
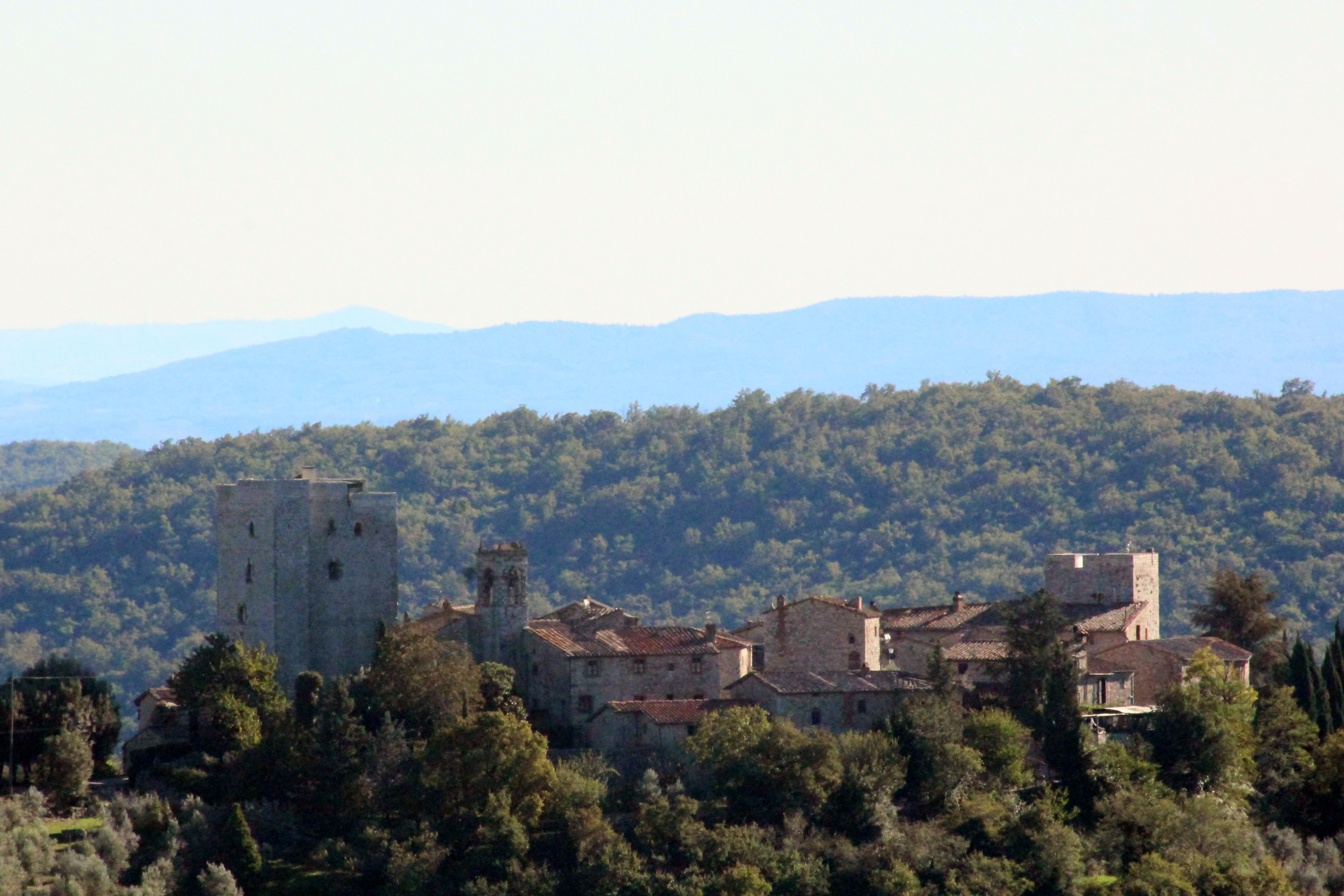
- View of Vertine

- Location of Vertine in Italy
- Coordinates: 43°28′11″N 11°25′3″E
- Country: Italy
- Region: Tuscany
- Province: Siena (SI)
- Comune: Gaiole in Chianti

Area
  - Total: 0.58 km^{2} (0.22 sq mi)
- Elevation: 505 m (1,657 ft)

Population (2011)
  - Total: 22
  - Density: 38/km^{2} (98/sq mi)
- Time zone: UTC+1 (CET)
  - Summer (DST): UTC+2 (CEST)

Vertine is a village in Tuscany, central Italy, administratively a frazione of the comune of Gaiole in Chianti, province of Siena. At the time of the 2001 census its population was 31.
