= San Giusto alle Monache =

- Frazione
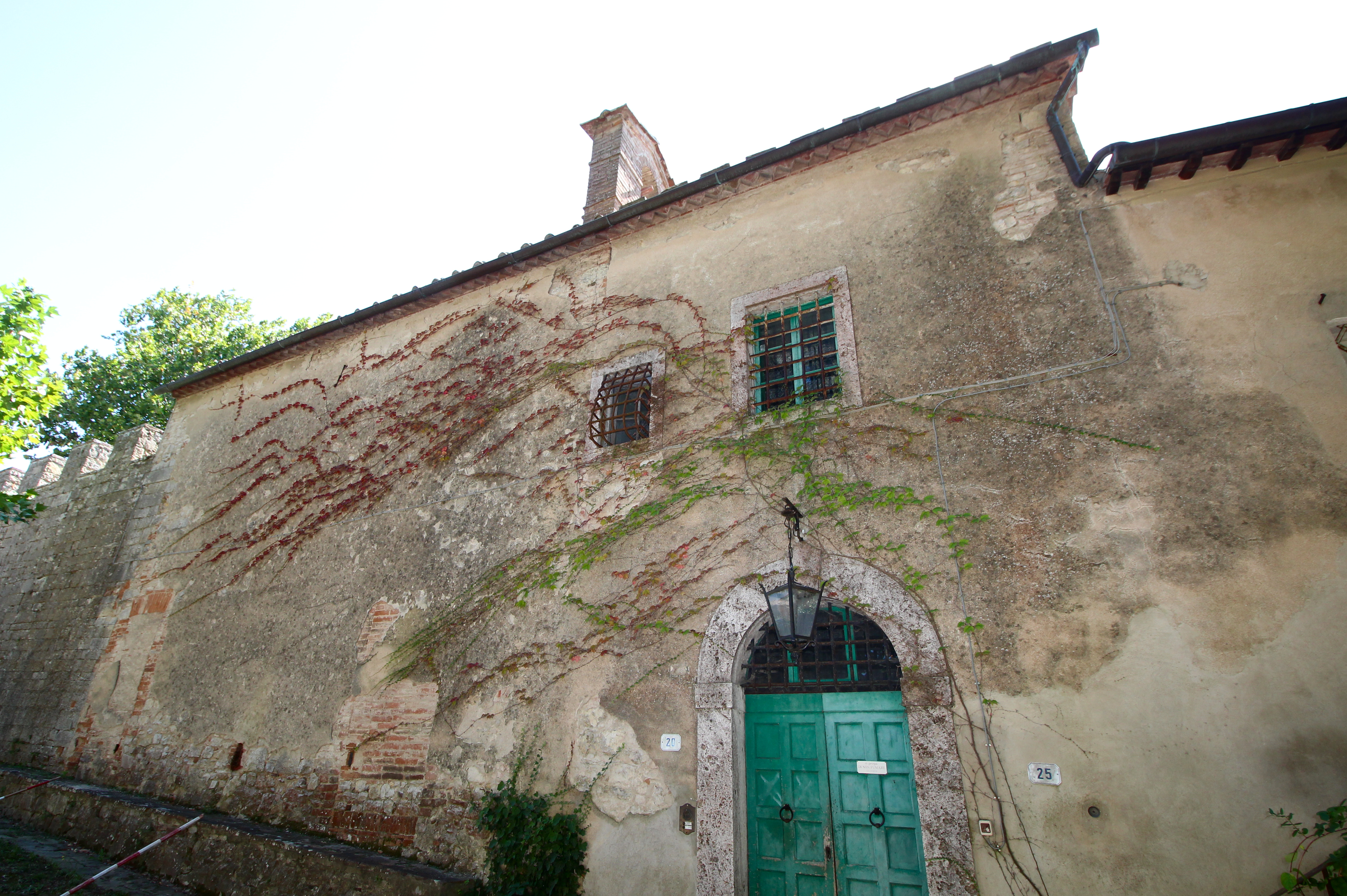
- The church of San Giusto a Rentennano

- Location of San Giusto alle Monache in Italy
- Coordinates: 43°22′9″N 11°25′21″E
- Country: Italy
- Region: Tuscany
- Province: Siena (SI)
- Comune: Gaiole in Chianti
- Elevation: 305 m (1,001 ft)

Population (2001)
  - Total: 25
- Time zone: UTC+1 (CET)
  - Summer (DST): UTC+2 (CEST)

San Giusto alle Monache (formerly Rentennano) is a village in Tuscany, central Italy, administratively a frazione of the comune of Gaiole in Chianti, province of Siena. At the time of the 2001 census its population was 25.

San Giusto alle Monache is about 20 km from Siena and 16 km from Gaiole in Chianti.
