= Fietri =

- Frazione
- Location of Fietri in Italy
- Coordinates: 43°25′41″N 11°29′57″E
- Country: Italy
- Region: Tuscany
- Province: Siena (SI)
- Comune: Gaiole in Chianti
- Elevation: 620 m (2,030 ft)
- Time zone: UTC+1 (CET)
  - Summer (DST): UTC+2 (CEST)

Fietri is a village in Tuscany, central Italy, located in the comune of Gaiole in Chianti, province of Siena.

Fietri is about 30 km from Siena and 15 km from Gaiole in Chianti.
