= Il Colle, Gaiole in Chianti =

Il Colle
- Frazione
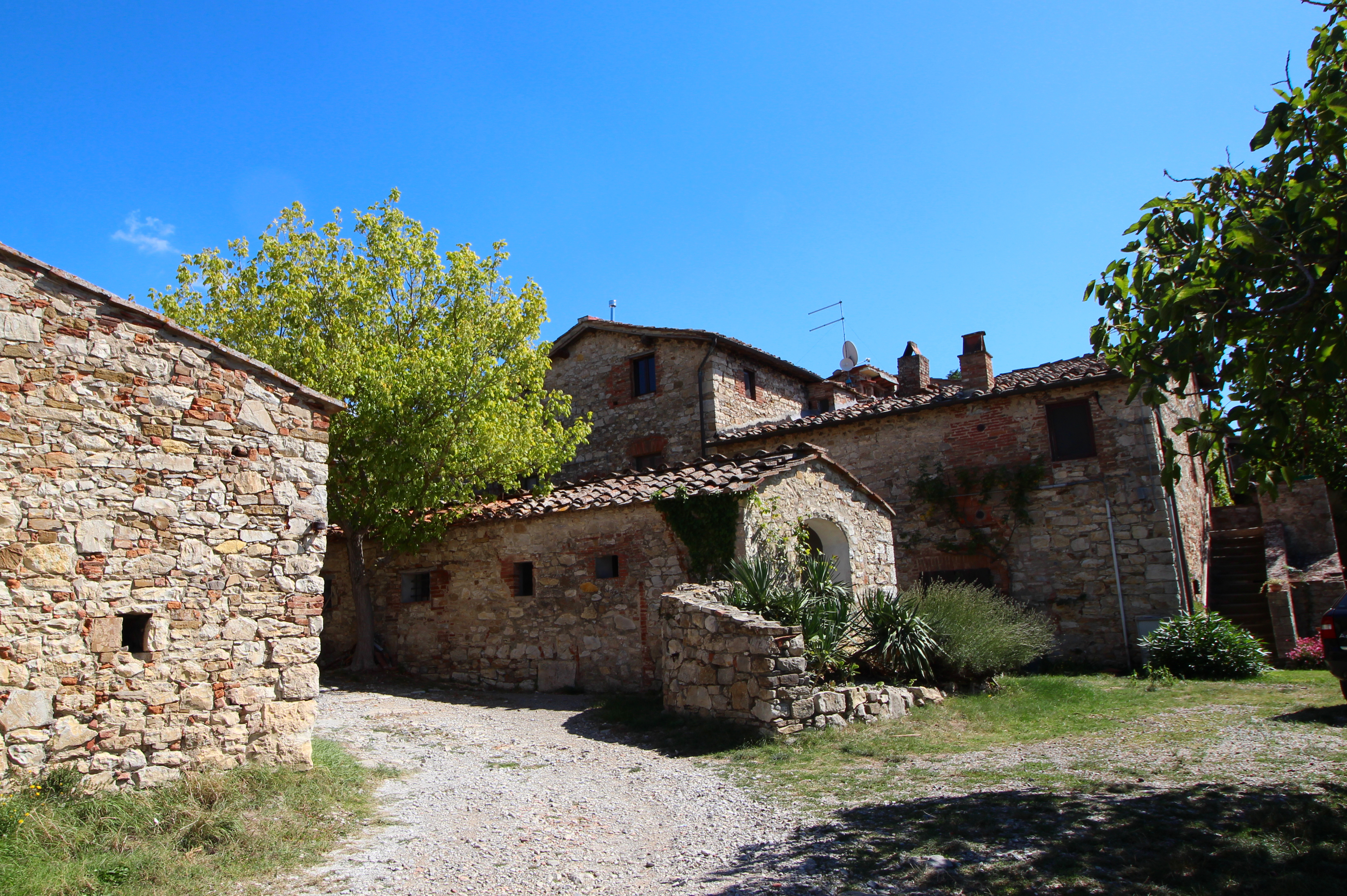

- Location of Il Colle in Italy
- Coordinates: 43°24′23″N 11°25′05″E
- Country: Italy
- Region: Tuscany
- Province: Siena (SI)
- Comune: Gaiole in Chianti
- Elevation: 408 m (1,339 ft)

Population (2001)
  - Total: 31
- Time zone: UTC+1 (CET)
  - Summer (DST): UTC+2 (CEST)

Il Colle (or Colle) is a village in Tuscany, central Italy, administratively a frazione of the comune of Gaiole in Chianti, province of Siena. At the time of the 2001 census its population was 31.

Il Colle is about 23 km from Siena and 13 km from Gaiole in Chianti.
