= Montegrossi =

- Frazione
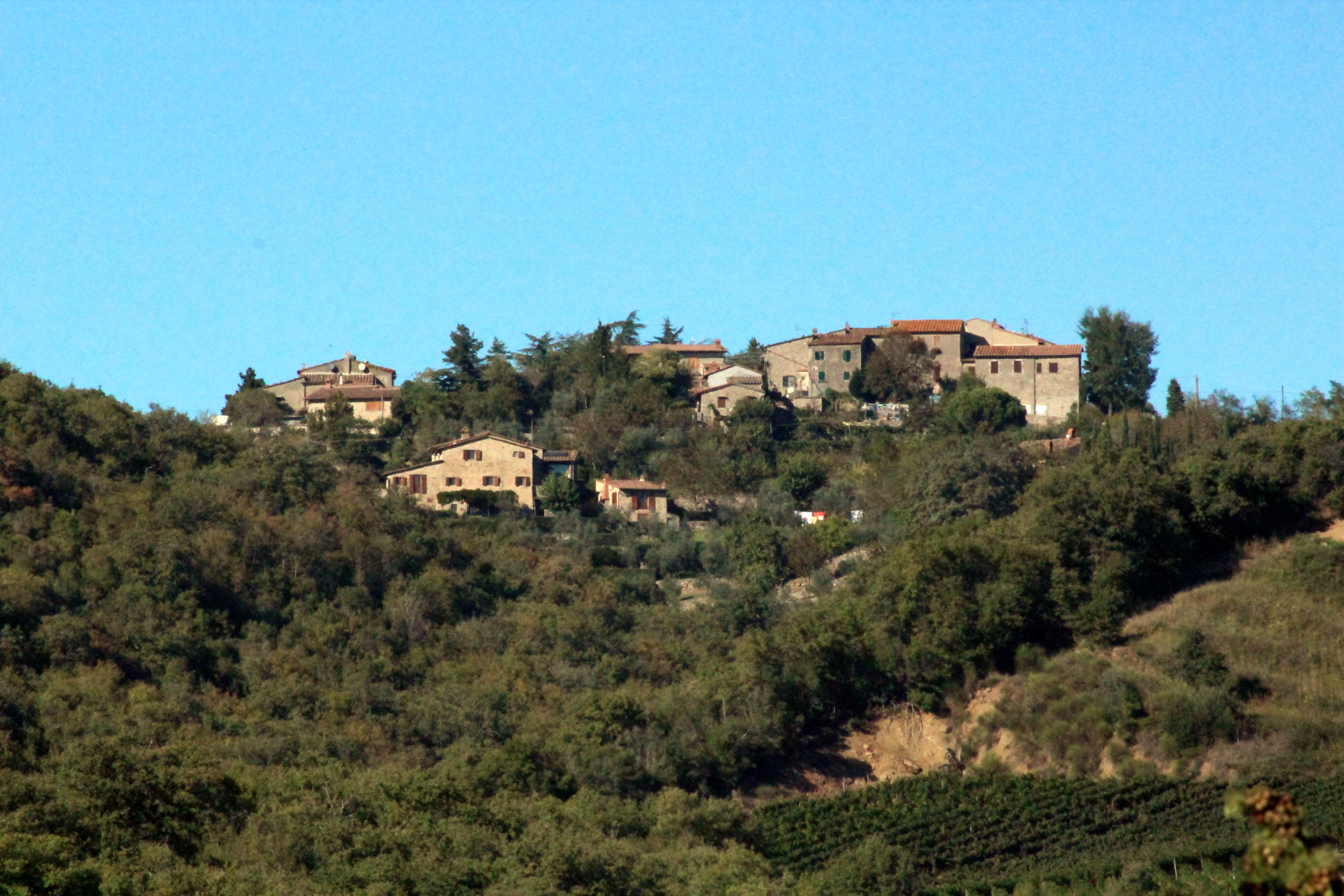
- View of Montegrossi

- Location of Montegrossi in Italy
- Coordinates: 43°28′54″N 11°27′17″E
- Country: Italy
- Region: Tuscany
- Province: Siena (SI)
- Comune: Gaiole in Chianti
- Elevation: 639 m (2,096 ft)

Population (2011)
  - Total: 26
- Time zone: UTC+1 (CET)
  - Summer (DST): UTC+2 (CEST)

Montegrossi is a village in Tuscany, central Italy, administratively a frazione of the comune of Gaiole in Chianti, province of Siena. Its population was 22 at the 2001 census.
