= San Vincenti =

Village in Tuscany, Italy

- Frazione
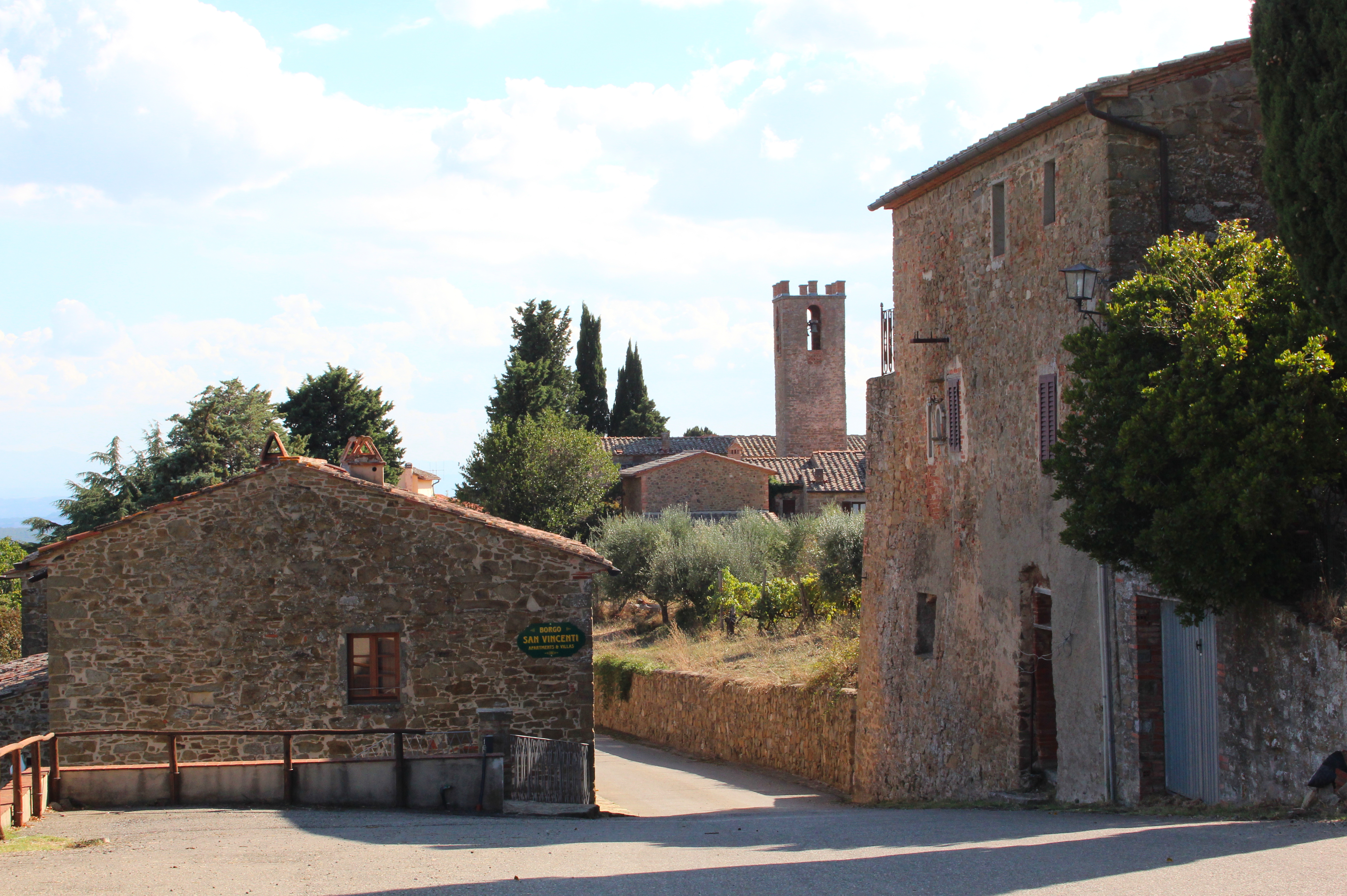

- Location of San Vincenti in Italy
- Coordinates: 43°25′24″N 11°32′00″E
- Country: Italy
- Region: Tuscany
- Province: Siena (SI)
- Comune: Gaiole in Chianti
- Elevation: 520 m (1,710 ft)

Population (2011)
  - Total: 6
- Demonym: Sanvincentini
- Time zone: UTC+1 (CET)
  - Summer (DST): UTC+2 (CEST)

San Vincenti is a village in Tuscany, central Italy, administratively a frazione of the comune of Gaiole in Chianti, province of Siena. In the 2001 census, its population was 10.
