= Starda =

- Frazione
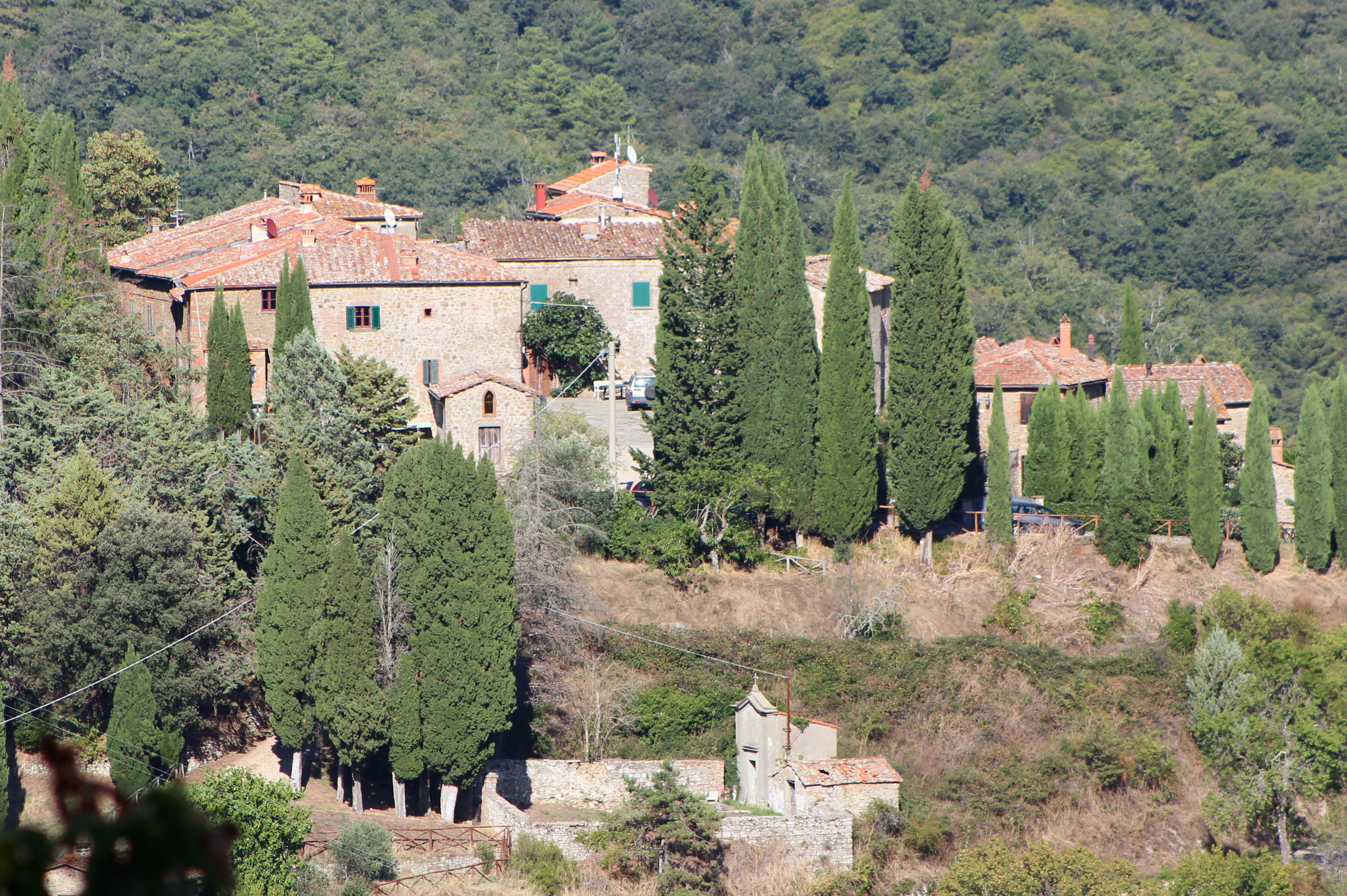
- View of Starda

- Location of Starda in Italy
- Coordinates: 43°27′37″N 11°31′4″E
- Country: Italy
- Region: Tuscany
- Province: Siena (SI)
- Comune: Gaiole in Chianti
- Elevation: 595 m (1,952 ft)
- Demonym(s): Stardese, stardesi
- Time zone: UTC+1 (CET)
  - Summer (DST): UTC+2 (CEST)

Starda is a village in Tuscany, central Italy, administratively a frazione of the comune of Gaiole in Chianti, province of Siena.

== History ==
The village of Starda was built around the year 1000, in the early medieval period, probably founded by the Guidi counts. Located in a strategic position along the road that leads to Montevarchi, in the county of Arezzo, it was often disputed by Florentines and Sienese.

Decayed starting from the 15th century, the village with the castle soon abandoned its defensive function, thus becoming more frequented as a stopping place for travelers, also thanks to the establishment of an important market.

In 1833 the village of Starda had 192 inhabitants. At the end of the 20th century, the village was transformed into an agritourism and winery.

== Gallery ==
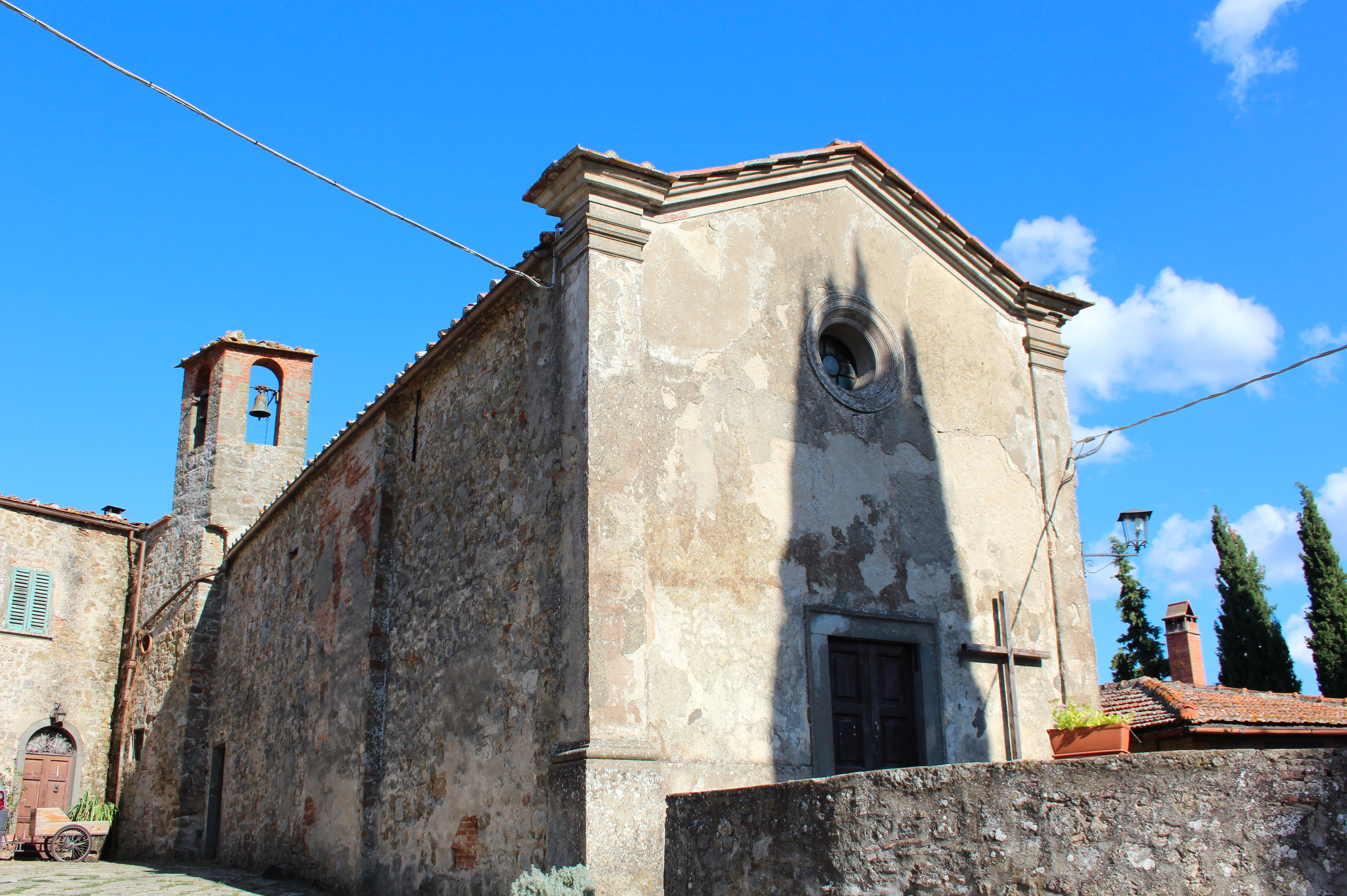
The church of San Martino

== Bibliography ==
- Emanuele Repetti (1843). "Starda". Dizionario geografico fisico storico della Toscana. Vol. 5. Florence. p. 460.
