= Barbischio =

Village in Tuscany, Italy

- Frazione
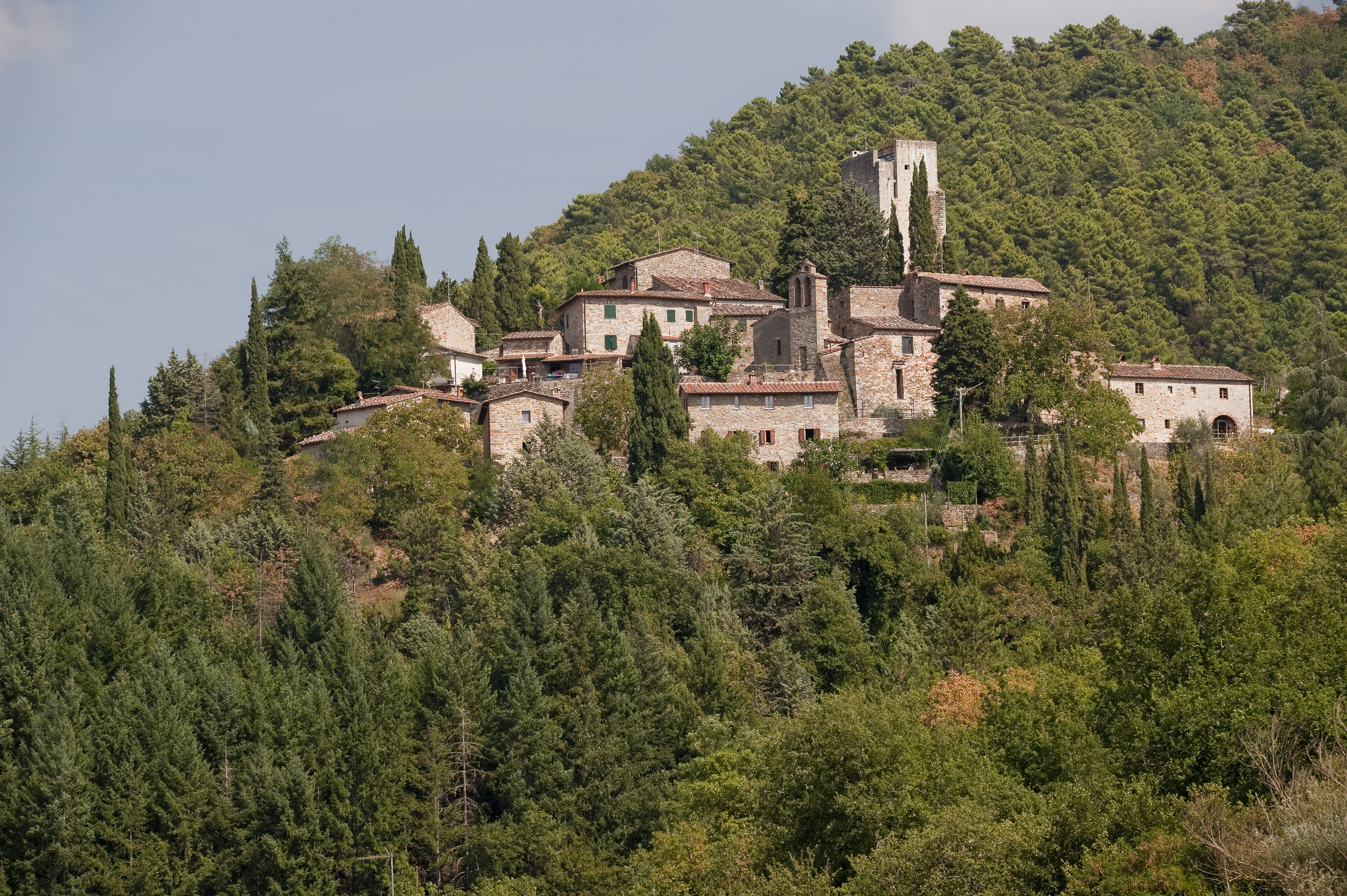
- View of Barbischio

- Location of Barbischio in Italy
- Coordinates: 43°27′47″N 11°27′16″E
- Country: Italy
- Region: Tuscany
- Province: Siena (SI)
- Comune: Gaiole in Chianti
- Elevation: 454 m (1,490 ft)

Population (2011)
  - Total: 28
- Time zone: UTC+1 (CET)
  - Summer (DST): UTC+2 (CEST)

Barbischio is a village in Tuscany, central Italy, administratively a frazione of the comune of Gaiole in Chianti, province of Siena. At the time of the 2001 census its population was 32.
