= Sansan =

Sansan may refer to:

- Sansan, Gers, commune in the Gers department, France
- Sansan, Iran, village in Zanjan Province, Iran
- SanSan, megapolitan area in California
- Sansan (Go), position in the board game of Go

== See also ==
- San San (disambiguation)
