= Galenda =

- Frazione
- Location of Galenda in Italy
- Coordinates: 43°27′16″N 11°22′38″E
- Country: Italy
- Region: Tuscany
- Province: Siena (SI)
- Comune: Gaiole in Chianti
- Elevation: 485 m (1,591 ft)

Population (2001)
  - Total: 12
- Time zone: UTC+1 (CET)
  - Summer (DST): UTC+2 (CEST)

Galenda is a village in Tuscany, central Italy, administratively a frazione of the comune of Gaiole in Chianti, province of Siena. At the time of the 2001 census its population was 12.

Galenda is about 30 km from Siena and 13 km from Gaiole in Chianti.
