= Lecchi in Chianti =

- Frazione
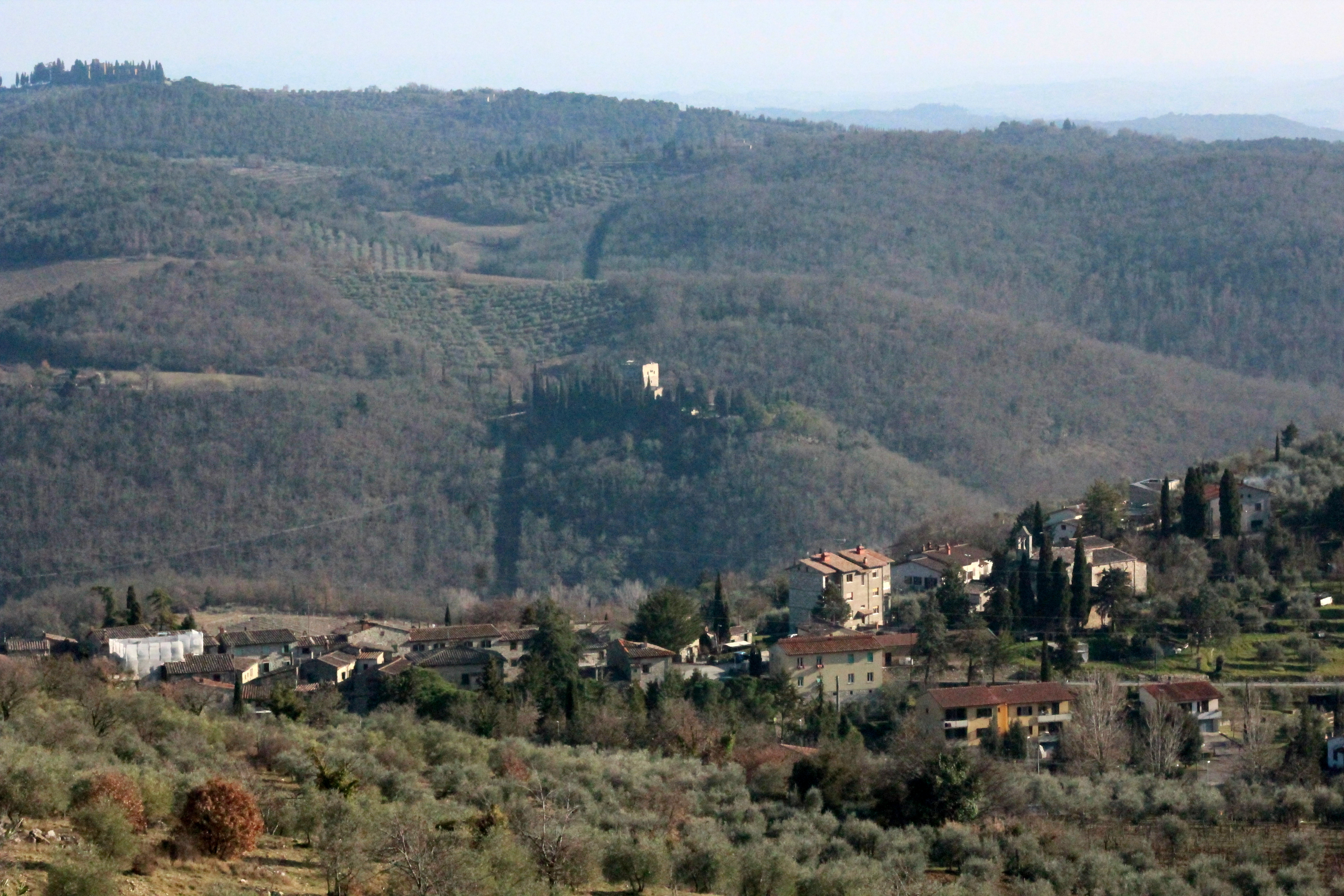
- View of Lecchi in Chianti

- Location of Lecchi in Chianti in Italy
- Coordinates: 43°26′00″N 11°24′00″E
- Country: Italy
- Region: Tuscany
- Province: Siena (SI)
- Comune: Gaiole in Chianti
- Elevation: 421 m (1,381 ft)

Population (2011)
  - Total: 101
- Demonym: Lecchiesi
- Time zone: UTC+1 (CET)
  - Summer (DST): UTC+2 (CEST)

Lecchi in Chianti is a village in Tuscany, central Italy, administratively a frazione of the comune of Gaiole in Chianti, province of Siena. At the time of the 2001 census its population was 111.
