= San Sano =

- Frazione
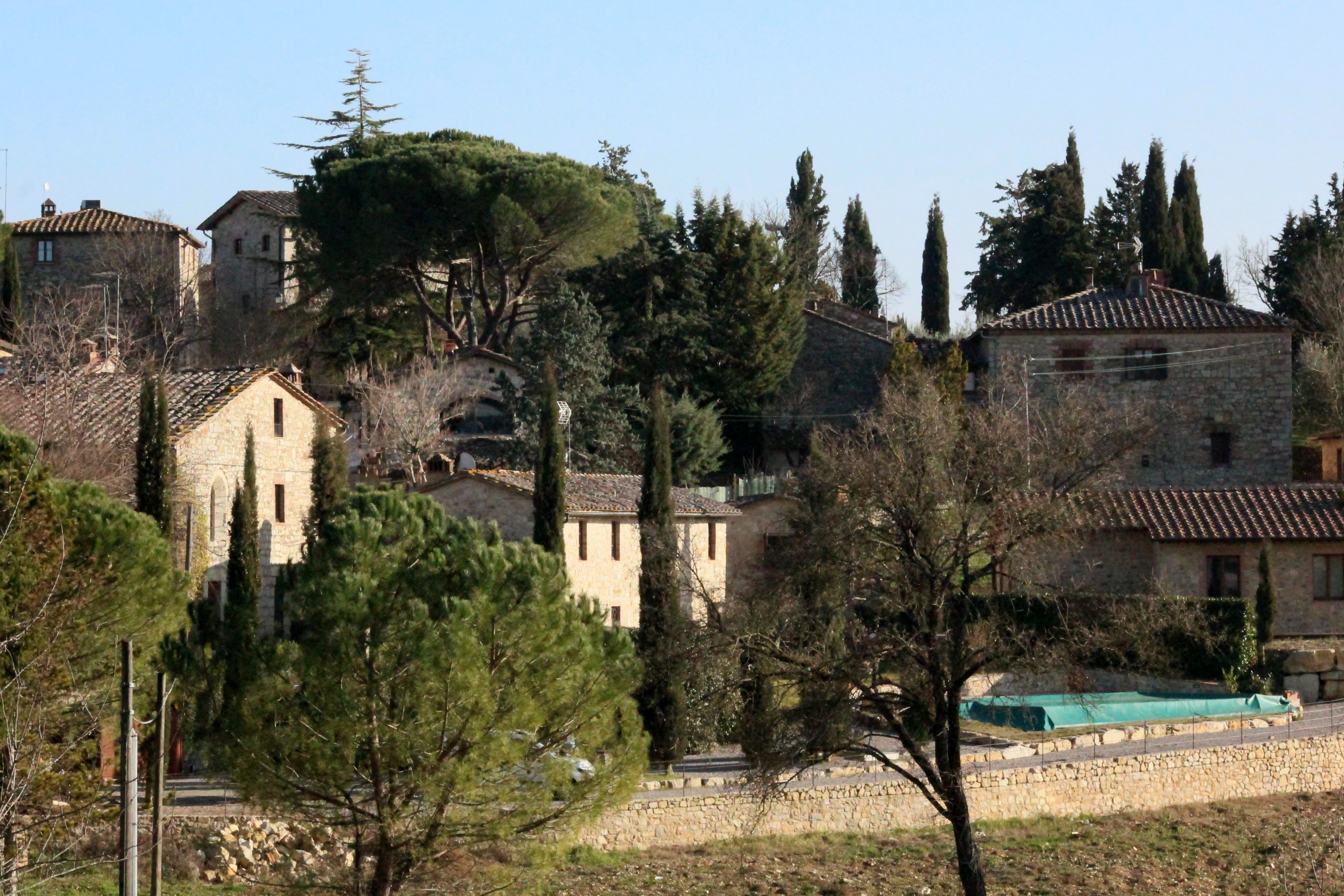
- View of San Sano

- Location of San Sano in Italy
- Coordinates: 43°25′21″N 11°23′24″E
- Country: Italy
- Region: Tuscany
- Province: Siena (SI)
- Comune: Gaiole in Chianti
- Elevation: 391 m (1,283 ft)

Population (2011)
  - Total: 82
- Time zone: UTC+1 (CET)
  - Summer (DST): UTC+2 (CEST)

San Sano is a village in Tuscany, central Italy, administratively a frazione of the comune of Gaiole in Chianti, province of Siena. At the time of the 2001 census its population was 70.
