= Adine, Gaiole in Chianti =

Adine
- Frazione
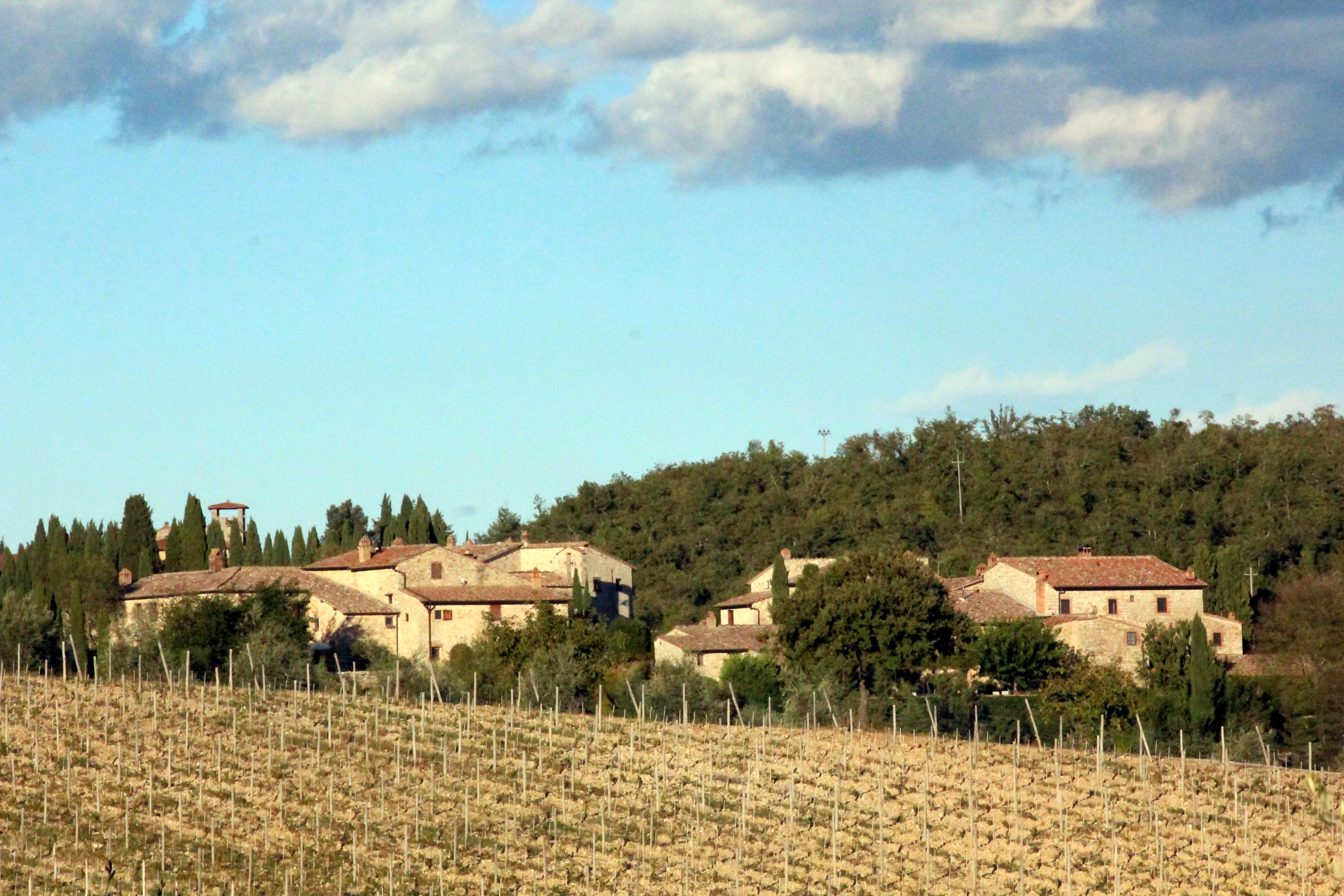
- View of Adine

- Location of Adine in Italy
- Coordinates: 43°27′4″N 11°23′48″E
- Country: Italy
- Region: Tuscany
- Province: Siena (SI)
- Comune: Gaiole in Chianti
- Elevation: 525 m (1,722 ft)

Population (2011)
  - Total: 10
- Time zone: UTC+1 (CET)
  - Summer (DST): UTC+2 (CEST)

Adine is a village in Tuscany, central Italy, administratively a frazione of the comune of Gaiole in Chianti, province of Siena. At the time of the 2001 census its population was 13.
