= Paola Ricciardi-Castagnoli =

Italian immunologist

- Education: University of Florence
- Occupation: Former scientific director of the Singapore Immunology Network
- Scientific career
- Fields: Immunology

Paola Ricciardi-Castagnoli (Italian pronunciation: [ˈpaːola ritˈtʃardi kastaɲˈɲɔːli]; born September 14, 1948) is an Italian immunologist based in Siena. Paola is the scientific director of Toscana Life Sciences Foundation (TLS) in Siena. She was former scientific director of the Singapore Immunology Network (SIgN).

== Career ==
Between 1998 and 2010, Ricciardi-Castagnoli was Chair of Immunology and General Pathology at the University of Milano-Bicocca. From 1975-1998 she was a member of the National Research Council of Italy in Milan and has also been a visiting scientist at MIT and a postdoctoral fellow at Stanford University. She graduated at the University of Florence in Biological Sciences and did a PhD in Immunology at the University Catholic of Louvain in Belgium.

Ricciardi-Castagnoli is a member of EMBO and of the German Academy of Sciences Leopoldina. Since 2002, she has been the President of the European Network of Immunology Institutes (ENII) and Chair of the IFREC-SIgN Winterschool on Advanced Immunology.

Ricciardi-Castagnoli, former adjunct Professor of Immunology at the National University of Singapore (NUS) and at Nanyang Technological University (NTU) is a member of the Scientific Advisory Boards of the Max Planck Institute for Infectiology in Berlin and of the Agence Nationale de la Recherche's Biology and Health Strategic Board in Paris. She was a former member of the Scientific Council of the Pasteur Institute in Paris. In 2007, together with Philippe Kourilsky, she founded the Singaporean Society of Immunology (SgSI). On June 2, 2012 the President of Italy, Giorgio Napolitano, awarded her with the honour as an officer of Order of the Star of Italy for her work conducted in Singapore.

== Scientific contributions ==
Ricciardi-Castagnoli has studied innate immunity over the last 30 years. Her laboratory is involved in the study of myeloid cells, and in particular dendritic cells (DC), significantly contributing to the identification of the central role of DC in regulating immunity. The present focus of her laboratory is dissecting the molecular mechanisms that DC employ to regulate immunity. Over the course of her career she has formed close collaborative links with many leading groups in the dendritic cell field. In 1996 she organized the 4th International Symposium of Dendritic Cells.

Ricciardi-Castagnoli is also a member of the Board of Directors of the International Society for Dendritic Cells founded by Ralph Steinman. Her laboratory was among the first to identify the key role that DC play in both innate and adaptive immune responses via the use of innate receptors such as the Toll-Like Receptors (TLRs). She contributed to the discovery that TLR4 is the receptor for LPS, a finding that led to the award of the Nobel Prize for Medicine to Bruce Beutler in 2011.

With her research group, Ricciardi-Castagnoli has published >300 publications in international peer reviewed journals, with >43,800 citations with an H-index of 83 (as of 2022) . One of the most relevant discoveries of her group is that DC are able to produce interleukin 2 (IL2) upon activation with appropriate microbial or sterile signals. The IL2 cytokine was thought to act only during adaptive immune responses, but is now recognized as a key player in both innate and adaptive immunity. To activate the transcription of IL2, DC (and their progenitors) use the calcineurin/NFAT (nuclear factor of activated T cells) mediated signaling pathway. In addition to their work on IL2, her group has shown that DC play a key role in mucosal tissues, such as the lamina propria of the intestinal villi where DC have a sentinel functions and sense the gut commensal flora with dendrites. This discovery has opened the way to novel studies on the role of the gut microbiome in regulating immune-mediated diseases.

== Honors and memberships ==
- German Academy of Sciences Leopoldina honorary member
- European Molecular Biology Organization honorary member
- Named the Top Italian Women Scientists in 2016 along with other 38 influential Italian researchers
- Member of the Scientific Council of the Institut Pasteur, Paris
- Member of the Scientific Advisory Board of Max Planck Institute for Infection Biology, Berlin
- Member of the FIMSA Board and International Union of Immunological Societies (IUIS) Council
- Member of the Agence Nationale de la Recherche's Biology and Health Strategic Board
- Awarded the officer of Order of the Star of Italy in 2012
