= Adine Riom =

French writer and poet

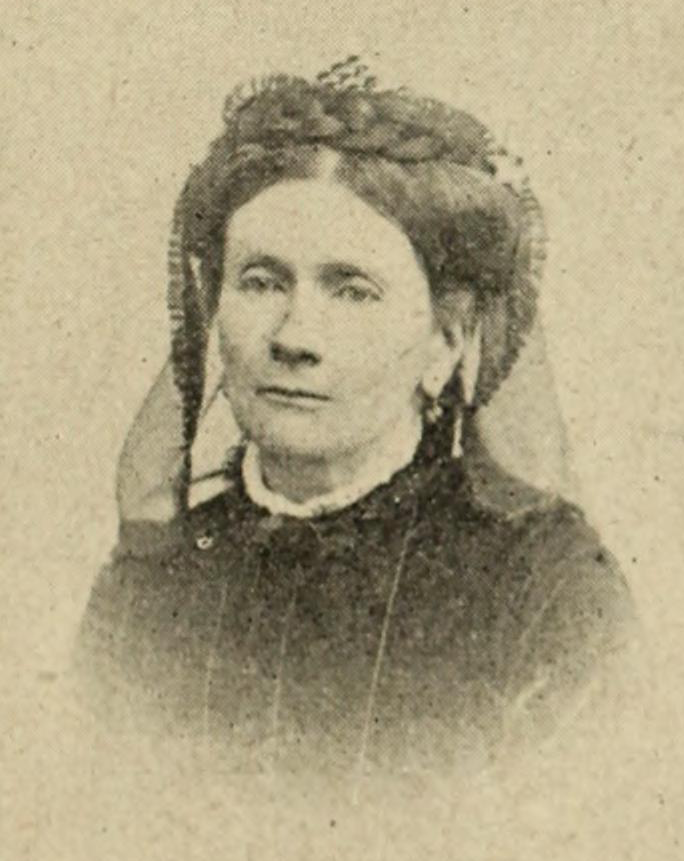
- Born: Alexandrine Louise Claudine Broband; October 25, 1818; Le Pellerin, France
- Died: August 28, 1899 (aged 80); Nantes, France
- Occupations: writer, poet, playwright
- Spouse: Alexandre Eugene Riom
- Writing career
- Pen name: Count of Saint-Jean, Louise d'Isole
- Language: French
- Genres: novel, poetry

Adine Riom, née Alexandrine Louise Claudine Broband (25 October 1818, in Le Pellerin – 28 August 1899, in Nantes) was a French writer, poet, and playwright.

== Life ==
Alexandrine Broband was born in Le Pellerin on 25 October 1818. She was a daughter of Louis Broband, a bodyguard of Napoleon Bonaparte’s sister Pauline. At the age of 22, she married the Nantes notary Alexandre Eugene Riom and moved to a private mansion in Nantes, Boulevard Delorme. At her home, Riom held a literary salon that attracted many regional writers such as Joseph Rousse, Émile Péhant, Eugène Lambert, Eugène Manuel, Émile Blin, Honoré Broutelle, Louis Tiercelin and Olivier de Courcuff.

She published several volumes of poetry under the pennames Count of Saint-Jean or Louise d'Isole. Her poetry was received with great success by the critics of the time, including Victor Hugo and Lamartine. Except for poetry Riom wrote three novels. She collaborated with numerous literary magazines such as La France littéraire, La Revue contemporain, and La Revue de Bretagne et de Vendée. Riom also participated in drafting an anthology of Breton poets of the 17th century published in 1884.

Adine Riom died on 28 August 1899 in Nantes.

Adine Riom Cultural Space in Le Pellerin, France was opened in her name recently.

== Works ==
=== Novels ===
- Le serment, ou La Chapelle de Bethléem; A. Guéraud, 1855
- Mobiles et zouaves bretons, 1871
- Michel Marion, épisode de la guerre de l'indépendance bretonne, 1879

=== Poetry and Theater Plays ===
- Oscar, poème, Nantes, 1850
- Reflets de la lumière; E. Dentu et A. Guéraud, 1857
- Flux et reflux, par le comte de Saint-Jean; E. Dentu & A. Guéraud, 1859
- Passion, 1864
- Après l'amour, sous le pseudonyme Louise d'Isole. Préface de Eugène Loudun; A. Lemerre, 1867
- Merlin; A. Lemerre, 1872
- Histoires et légendes bretonnes, 1873
- Salomon et la reine de Saba, légende orientale, 1873
- Fleurs du passé, 1880
- Légendes bibliques et orientales, 1882
- Les Adieux, poésies bretonnes. Préface d'Eugène Manuel; A. Lemerre, 1895
- Les Oiseaux des tournelles
- Les femmes poètes bretonnes
- Le Chêne, rêve signé Louise d’Isole; Nantes, 1880

=== Anthology ===
- Anthologie des poètes bretons du 17me siècle, Nantes, 1884
