= San San River =

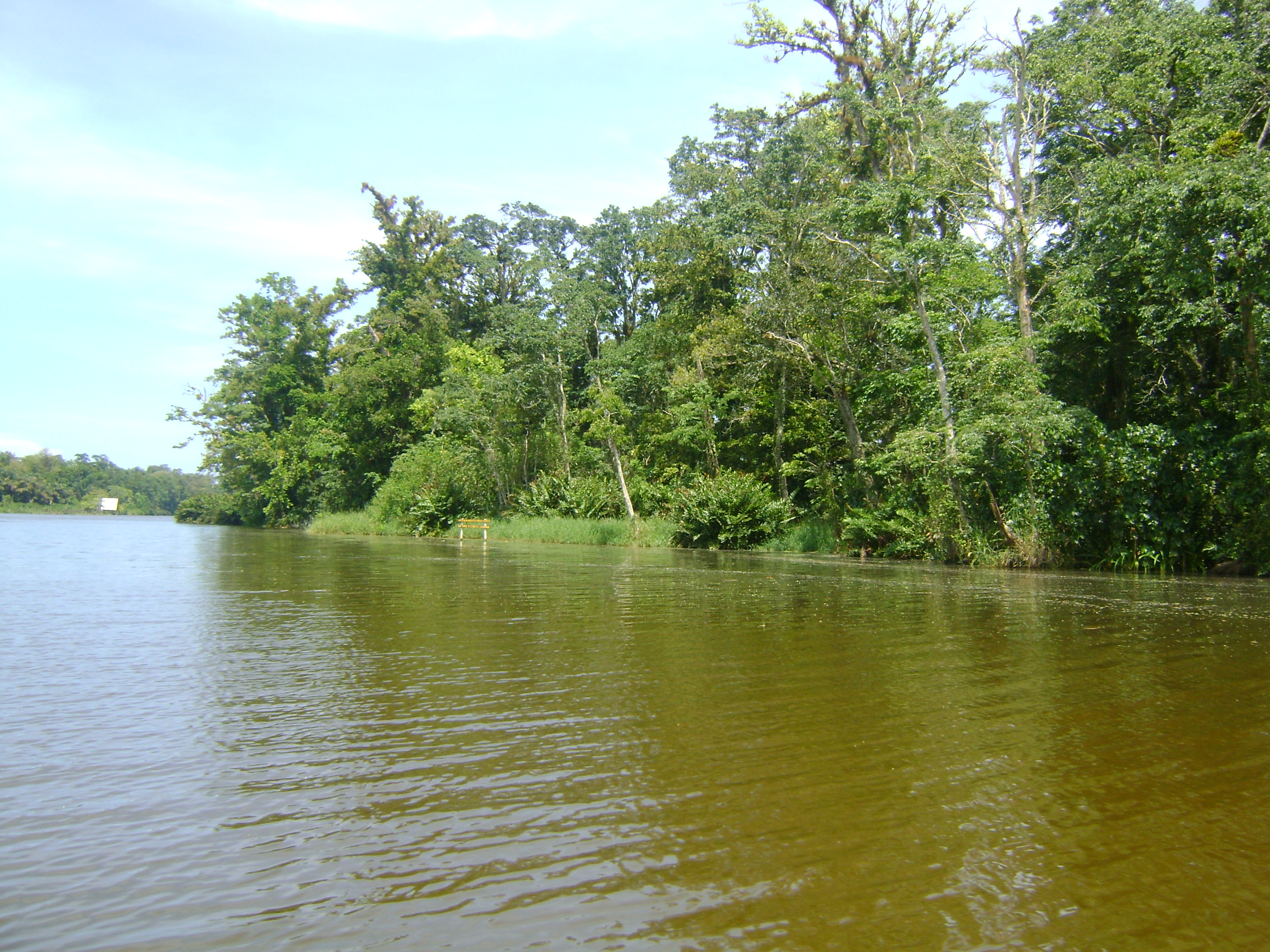

Location
- Country: Panama

Physical characteristics
- Mouth: Caribbean Sea
  - coordinates: 9°31′54″N 82°31′00″W

The San San River is a river of Panama.

== See also ==
- List of rivers of Panama
