= Adine Gemberg =

German author

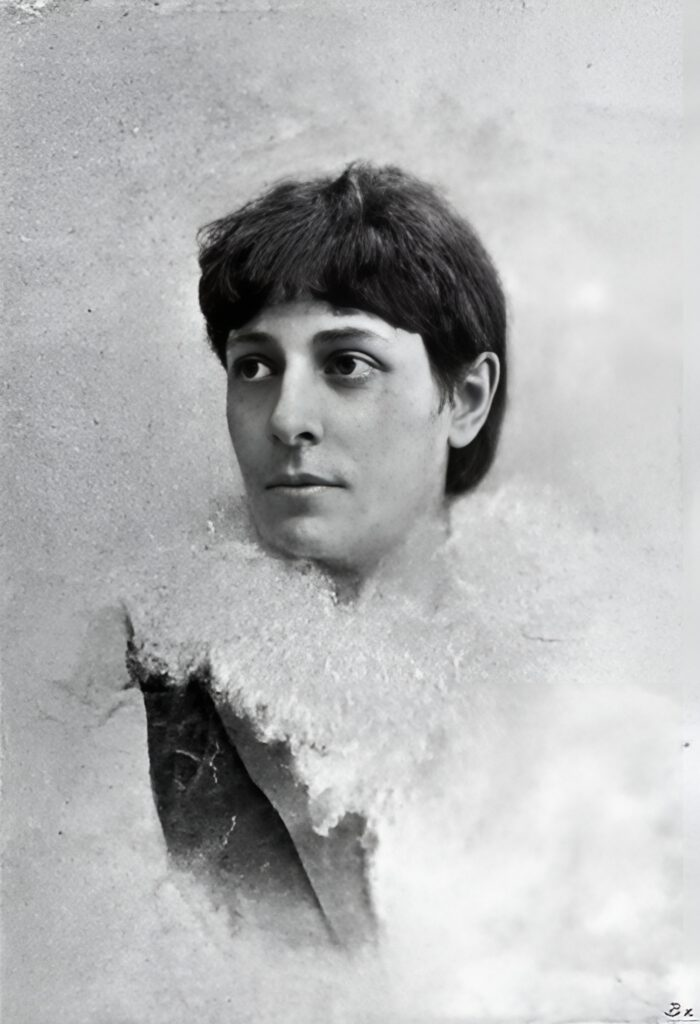
- Born: 28 April 1860; Saint Petersburg
- Died: 10 August 1902 (aged 42); Lutherstadt Wittenberg
- Occupation: Writer
- Writing career
- Genre: novels

Adine Gemberg, actually Alexandra ("Adja") Carlowna Gemberg, née von Becker, also de Baker, (April 28, 1858, Julian calendar April 16, Saint Petersburg — August 19, 1902, Wittenberg), was a German writer, novel and novella author, journalist and feminist social critic.

== Life and work ==
Gemberg was the daughter of Carl Andreas von Becker (* May 5, 1821, in Einbeck; † March 4, 1894, in Wiesbaden), and his wife, the Georgian-Russian Princess Vera Ivanova (or Simeonovna) Gévachoff (also Vera Shewachow) (* September 21, 1836, in Saint Petersburg; † March 8, 1860, in Hyères) Her father was a German language teacher, court librarian, Imperial Russian real state councillor at the tsar's court and cabinet secretary to the Russian Grand Duchess Elena Pavlovna and her daughter Maria Mikhailovna Romanova.

Due to the early death of her mother, she and her sister Sophie, who was one year younger, grew up separately from their father in Lüneburg with her paternal grandparents and her unmarried aunt, who took responsibility for her upbringing. She also spent a year alone with an aunt in Braunschweig. After completing a girls' boarding school in Hanover, she went to Karlsruhe with her father, who had left the Russian service in 1873, and her sister, Karlsruhe, where, after a quarrel with her father and a further stay in a boarding school in Celle, she trained as a free apprentice at the deaconess institution there and worked in the hospital run by the deaconesses, but without being consecrated as such and thus entering the community. On May 19, 1878, Adine von Becker married the widowed officer Gustav Gemberg (* January 23, 1841 in Meyenberg, † March 23, 1912 in Wittenberg), whose name she took and with whom she had six children, one daughter and five sons, one of whom died in infancy. The family, which also included a son from Gustav Gemberg's first marriage, first lived in Karlsruhe, then, due to the usual transfers of a young officer, in Engers near Koblenz, in Brandenburg an der Havel and finally in Wittenberg. Gustav Gemberg retired as a major as early as 1888, which also significantly reduced the social duties of his wife, whose fragile health he was very worried about according to his letters, and allowed her to become a writer based on her professional experience.

In the year of her marriage, she began work on an extensive autobiography entitled "A Girl's Life", in which she relentlessly reveals the oppressive circumstances of her life and the uncomprehending and sometimes violent actions of the people in her family who had made her childhood and youth a living hell. However, for reasons unknown, she abandoned the work without having covered the last four years before the marriage and without having reached the planned conclusion with the chapters "Wedding" and "Conclusion". She therefore ultimately refrained from publication, perhaps in view of her husband's professional position and the expected negative reactions from people who saw themselves in a bad light. She first made her debut as an author in 1887 with Humoresken for the Berliner Volkszeitung. In 1894, under the pseudonym Tervachoff, she published two essays with historical content (on Tsarina Catherine II and Tsar Ivan IV), which were followed by "a series of several historical novels from Russia's past [...] in the style of (Gustav) Freitags (sic) Ahnen". Instead, she wrote her first work under her own name, the essay "Die evangelische Diakonie. A contribution to solving the women's question", which was published in Berlin in 1894, which began her search for concepts of a specifically female, meaningful way of life and her critical scrutiny of them. For this, as for her entire path as a writer, her own professional experience gained before her marriage was of essential importance. In 1895, the novella "Morphium" was published by S. Fischer through Paul Lindau. The title novella of the book was rejected by several family magazines due to its open thematization of drug addiction and "caused a great stir." In 1896, she also published the socially critical novel "Aufzeichnungen einer Diakonissin" in Berlin. This elaborates on the dangers associated with the deaconesses' complete loss of autonomy much more sharply than the essay and is now considered an early example of feminist literature. In the same year, she published the socially critical essay Das heimliche Elend (The Secret Misery). In it, she criticizes the taboo and blatant underpayment of female gainful employment and highlights this as the real cause of social impoverishment for women from middle-class backgrounds. In 1898, the novella collection "Der dritte Bruder. Sleep – Death – Madness". Among other things, the novella "Ein Genuß" ("A Pleasure") depicts the fate of another addict, which underpins the novella "Morphium". In the story "Sick Love", another taboo subject of the era, the questionable conditions in psychiatric clinics are openly addressed. In the following year, the novel "The Fulfilment of the Law" followed as the last work of the intensive creative period, which lasted only six years. This deals with the destruction of the love relationship and family of an artist couple due to the husband's fantasies of grandiosity and loss of reality as well as traditional role assignments to the wife, but also her religiously motivated idealization of her self-sacrifice. It also contains a critical examination of Friedrich Nietzsche's concept of the Übermensch and its reception, including by the women's movement. After a prolonged serious illness, Adine Gemberg died on March 4, 1902, at the age of 44.
