= Castagnoli, Gaiole in Chianti =

Castagnoli
- Frazione
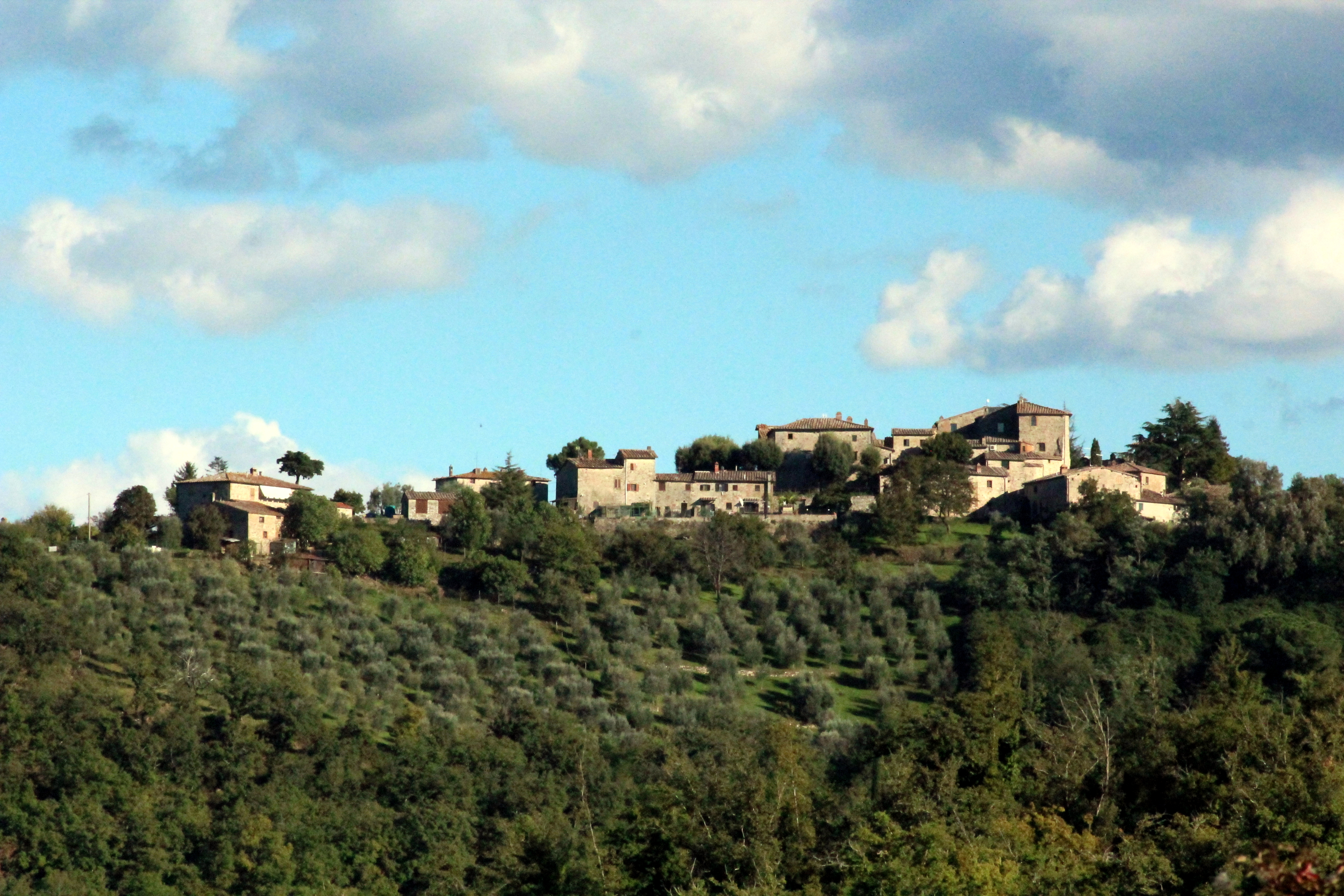
- View of Castagnoli

- Location of Castagnoli in Italy
- Coordinates: 43°26′35″N 11°27′8″E
- Country: Italy
- Region: Tuscany
- Province: Siena (SI)
- Comune: Gaiole in Chianti
- Elevation: 505 m (1,657 ft)

Population (2011)
  - Total: 79
- Demonym: Castagnolesi
- Time zone: UTC+1 (CET)
  - Summer (DST): UTC+2 (CEST)

Castagnoli is a village in Tuscany, central Italy, administratively a frazione of the comune of Gaiole in Chianti, province of Siena. At the time of the 2001 census its population was 86.
