= Lacolle =

Lacolle may refer to:

== Places ==
- Lacolle, Quebec, a municipality in southern Quebec, Canada
- Champlain–St. Bernard de Lacolle Border Crossing, connects Champlain, New York and St-Bernard-de-Lacolle, Quebec on the United States–Canada border
- LaColle Falls Hydroelectric Dam, a partially completed dam on the North Saskatchewan River, in Prince Albert, Saskatchewan, Canada
- Lacolle Mills Blockhouse, a blockhouse located in Saint-Paul-de-l'Île-aux-Noix, Quebec
- Lacolle River, a tributary of the Richelieu River in Montérégie, Quebec, Canada
- Saint-Bernard-de-Lacolle, a municipality in Les Jardins-de-Napierville Regional County Municipality, Quebec, Canada, located in the administrative area of Montérégie

== Military events ==
- Battle of Lacolle Mills (1812), British victory during the War of 1812
- Battle of Lacolle Mills (1814), British victory during the War of 1812
- Battle of Lacolle (1838), Battle of the 1838 Lower Canada Rebellion

== See also ==
- Colle (disambiguation)
