= Battle of Lacolle =

Several battles have been fought at or near the town of Lacolle, Quebec, Canada:

- Battle of Lacolle Mills (1812), British victory during the War of 1812
- Battle of Lacolle Mills (1814), British victory during the War of 1812
- Battle of Lacolle (1838), British authorities rout rebels during the Lower Canada Rebellion
