= Colley (surname) =

Colley is a surname. In England it contained the root col from which is derived Cole. It is also of Gambian origin. Notable people with the surname include:

- Angela Colley (born 1964), Gambian politician
- Anne Colley (born 1951), Irish politician
- David Colley (born 1947), Australian cricketer
- Ebrima Colley (born 2000), Gambian footballer
- George Colley (1925–1983), Irish politician
- George Pomeroy Colley (1835–1881), British general
- Harold John Colley (1895–1918), British soldier
- Henry Colley, multiple people
- John Edward Colley (born 1948), original name of John Ford Coley, American pianist
- Joseph Colley (born 1999), Swedish footballer
- Joshua Colley (born 2002), American actor and singer
- Kenneth Colley (1937–2025), British actor
- Kevin Colley (born 1979), American ice hockey player
- Lamin Colley (born 1993), Gambian footballer
- Linda Colley (born 1949), British historian
- Mariama Colley (born 1988), Gambian actress
- Michael Colley (1938–2013), American vice-admiral
- Omar Colley (born 1992), Gambian footballer
- Randy Colley (1950–2019), American wrestler
- Richard Colley, multiple people
- Robert Colley, multiple people
- Russell Colley (1897–1996), engineer, early spacesuit creator
- Samantha Colley (born 1987), British actress
- Samuel Colley (1807–1890), American politician
- Sarah Ophelia Colley Cannon or Minnie Pearl (1912–1996), American country comedian
- Saruba Colley (born 1989), Gambian sprinter
- Scott Colley (born 1963), American jazz double bassist and composer
- Susan Jane Colley (born 1959), American mathematician
- Thomas Colley, 18th century Sellack, Herefordshire gentry
- William Dixon Colley (1913–2001), Gambian journalist

== See also ==
- Coles (surname)
- Coley (surname)
- Colle (disambiguation)
- Colles (disambiguation)
- Collie (disambiguation) (includes many people called Collie or Colly)
- Cowley (surname)
