= Battle of Lacolle Mills =

Battle of Lacolle Mills may refer to:

- Battle of Lacolle Mills (1812), a battle of the War of 1812
- Battle of Lacolle Mills (1814), a battle of the War of 1812
- Battle of Lacolle (1838), a battle of the Lower Canada Rebellion
