= Colvey =

Colvey is a surname. Notable people with the surname include:

- Joe Colvey (born 1948), former Canadian football player
- Kip Colvey (born 1994), former New Zealand footballer
- Stéphanie Colvey (born 1949), Canadian photographer

== See also ==
- Colley (surname)
