= Collie (name) =

List of people with the same name

Collie or Colly is a surname, given name, and nickname. It may refer to:

== People with the surname ==
- Alexander Collie (1793–1835), Scottish surgeon and naturalist
- Anthony Colly, English politician
- Austin Collie (born 1985), American retired National Football League player
- Bruce Collie (born 1962), American retired National Football League player
- J. Norman Collie (1859–1942), British explorer and scientist
- John Collie (musician), New Zealand retired drummer
- Mark Collie (born 1956), American country singer/songwriter and actor
- Max Collie (1931–2018), Australian jazz trombonist
- John Collie (doctor) (1860–1935), Scottish medical doctor and public servant
- Stephanie Collie (1963–2024), English costume designer

== People with the given name ==
- Collie Knox (1899–1977), British author and journalist
- David Collie Martin (1890–1917), Scottish footballer
- Collie O'Shea (born 1991), Irish rugby union player

== People with the nickname ==
- Paul Collingwood (born 1976), English cricketer
- Colin Moran (Gaelic footballer) (born 1980), Gaelic footballer
- Collie Smith (1933–1959), Jamaican cricketer

== See also ==
- Colley (disambiguation)
- Colley (given name)
- Colley (surname)
- Collie (disambiguation)
- Colly Ezeh (born 1979), Hong Kong football player originally from Nigeria
