= Cookesley =

Cookesley is a surname. Notable people with the surname include:

- Margaret Murray Cookesley (1844–1927), British artist
- William Cookesley (1802–1880), British scholar and cleric

== See also ==
- Cooksley
