= Cooley =

Cooley may refer to:

- Cooley (surname), a surname (and a list of people with the surname)
- Cooley Distillery, an Irish whiskey distillery
- Cooley LLP, a Silicon Valley–based law firm
- Cooley Peninsula, Ireland
- Cooley High School, Detroit, Michigan, United States
- Cooley Law School, Lansing, Michigan, United States
- McNary, Arizona, formerly known as Cooley
- Cooley, County Tyrone, a townland in County Tyrone, Northern Ireland

== See also ==
- Cooley High, a 1975 film produced by American International Pictures
- Cooley v. Board of Wardens (53 U.S. 299) (1853), a United States Supreme Court case regarding shipping
- Táin Bó Cúailnge (Cattle Raid of Cooley), a central tale in the Ulster Cycle of Irish mythology
- Birch Cooley Township, Minnesota, in Renville County, Minnesota, United States
- Cowley (disambiguation)
- Coley (disambiguation)
- Colley (disambiguation)
- Coolie, an Asian slave or a racial slur
- Cooley Mountains, Cooley Peninsula, County Louth, Ireland
