= La Colle (disambiguation) =

La Colle may refer to:

- La Colle
- La Colle, Monaco
- La Colle-sur-Loup

== See also ==
- Colle (disambiguation)
- Lacolle (disambiguation)
