= Colle =

Colle or Collé (French word meaning "glue", Italian word meaning "hill") may refer to:

== Places ==
=== Canada ===
- Lacolle, municipality in the Quebec province

=== France ===
- La Colle-sur-Loup, municipality in the Alpes-Maritimes department

=== Italy ===
Municipalities (comuni)

- Alice Bel Colle, in the province of Alessandria
- Capriano del Colle, in the province of Brescia
- Colle Brianza, in the province of Lecco
- Colle d'Anchise, in the province of Campobasso
- Colle di Tora, in the province of Rieti
- Colle di Val d'Elsa, in the province of Siena
- Colle San Magno, in the province of Frosinone
- Colle Sannita, in the province of Benevento
- Colle Santa Lucia, in the province of Belluno
- Colle Umberto, in the province of Treviso
- Gioia del Colle, in the province of Bari
- Oltre il Colle, in the province of Bergamo
- Palo del Colle, in the province of Bari
- San Damiano al Colle, in the province of Pavia
- Santa Giustina in Colle, in the province of Padua
- Santeramo in Colle, in the province of Bari

Civil parishes (frazioni)

- Colle, Bettona, in the municipality of Bettona (PG)
- Colle, Monteleone d'Orvieto, in the municipality of Monteleone d'Orvieto (TR)
- Colle, Rocca Santa Maria, in the municipality of Rocca Santa Maria (TE)
- Colle, Sansepolcro, in the municipality of Sansepolcro (AR)
- Il Colle, Gaiole in Chianti, in the municipality of Gaiole in Chianti (SI)
- Il Colle-Villa, in the municipality of Calci (PI)

== Other uses ==
- Colle (surname)
- Colle (grape), another name for the French wine grape Gouais blanc
  - Muscadelle, another French wine grape that is also known as Colle
- Colle System, a chess opening strategy for white

== See also ==
- Colli (disambiguation)
- Colley (disambiguation), a surname
- Lacolle (disambiguation)
- La Colle (disambiguation)
