= Catherine Cooksey =

Catherine Cooksey may refer to:

- Catherine Cooksey (educator)
- Catherine Cooksey (chemist)
