= Colli =

Colli may refer to:

== Places of Italy ==
Municipalities (comuni)

- Colli a Volturno, in the province of Isernia
- Colli del Tronto, in the province of Ascoli Piceno
- Colli sul Velino, in the province of Rieti

Civil parishes (frazioni)

- Colli (Monte San Giovanni Campano), in the municipality of Monte San Giovanni Campano (FR)
- Colli di Fontanelle, in the municipality of Sant'Agnello (NA)
- Colli San Pietro, in the municipality of Piano di Sorrento (NA)
- Colli, Umbria

== Other uses ==
- Colli (surname)
- Carrozzeria Colli, defunct Italian automobile manufacturer

== See also ==
- Colle (disambiguation)
- Collie / Colly - disambiguation page
