= Cooksley =

Cooksley is a surname. Notable people with the surname include:

- Bert Cooksley OBE (1892–1980), New Zealand politician of the National Party
- Graeme Cooksley, New Zealand former rugby league footballer, represented NZ in the 1970 and 1972 World Cups
- Harry Cooksley (born 1994), English association footballer
- Mark Cooksley (born 1971), former professional rugby union player and All Black lock

== See also ==
- Cookley
- Cooksey
- Cooley (disambiguation)
