= Coley =

Coley may refer to:

== Places ==
- Coley, Berkshire, a suburb of the town of Reading, Berkshire, England
  - Coley (Reading ward), a ward of Reading Borough Council somewhat co-terminous with the suburb
- Coley, Somerset, a hamlet in the civil parish of East Harptree, Somerset, England
- Coley, Staffordshire, a hamlet in the civil parish of Gnossol, Staffordshire, England
- Coley, West Yorkshire, a village in the borough of Calderdale, West Yorkshire, England

== People ==
- Coley (surname), including a list of people with the name
- Coley (given name), including a list of people with the name

== Other uses ==
- Coley (fish), a species of fish Pollachius virens

== See also ==
- Coalie (disambiguation)
- Coley Building, a historic building in Mobile, Alabama, United States
- Coley Park, a suburb of Reading, Berkshire, England
- Coley's Point, a settlement in Newfoundland and Labrador, Canada
- Coley's toxins, an early attempted treatment for cancer
