= Kolley =

Kolley may refer to:

- Abdou Kolley (21st century), Gambian politician
- Kolley Kibber, a fictional character

== See also ==
- Colley (disambiguation)
