= Cooksey =

Cooksey is an English surname. It is commonly found in the West Midlands, originally given to people from Cooksey in Worcestershire. Notable people with the surname include:

- Catherine Cooksey, American chemist
- Cleophus Cooksey Jr. (born 1982), American serial killer
- Danny Cooksey (born 1975), American actor
- David Cooksey (1940–2024), British businessman
- Donald Cooksey (1892–1977), American physicist
- Ernie Cooksey (1980–2008), English footballer
- Frank C. Cooksey (1933–2025), American politician and environmental activist
- John Cooksey (1941–2022), American physician and politician
- Mark Cooksey (born 1966), English video game musician
- Patricia Cooksey (born 1958), American jockey
- Poppy Cooksey (born 1940), as Janet Wardell-Yerburgh a British Olympic fencer
- Scott Cooksey (born 1972), English footballer

== See also ==
- Cooksey, Missouri, an unincorporated community
