= Coley (given name) =

Coley is a unisex given name that means "coal meadow" or "dark clearing". Notable people with the name include:

== Men ==
- Coley Jones, American country blues mandolin player
- Coley McDonough (1915–1965), American football player
- Coley O'Brien, Irish footballer
- Coley O'Toole, keyboard and rhythm guitar player for the We Are Kings American rock band
- Coley Wallace (1927–2005), American actor and heavyweight boxer

== Women ==
- Coley Campany, American actress
- Coley McCabe, American country music singer
- Coley Sohn, American screenwriter, director, and actress

== See also ==
- Coley (surname)
