= Lacolle Mills Blockhouse =

Coordinates: 45°4′8″N 73°20′31″W

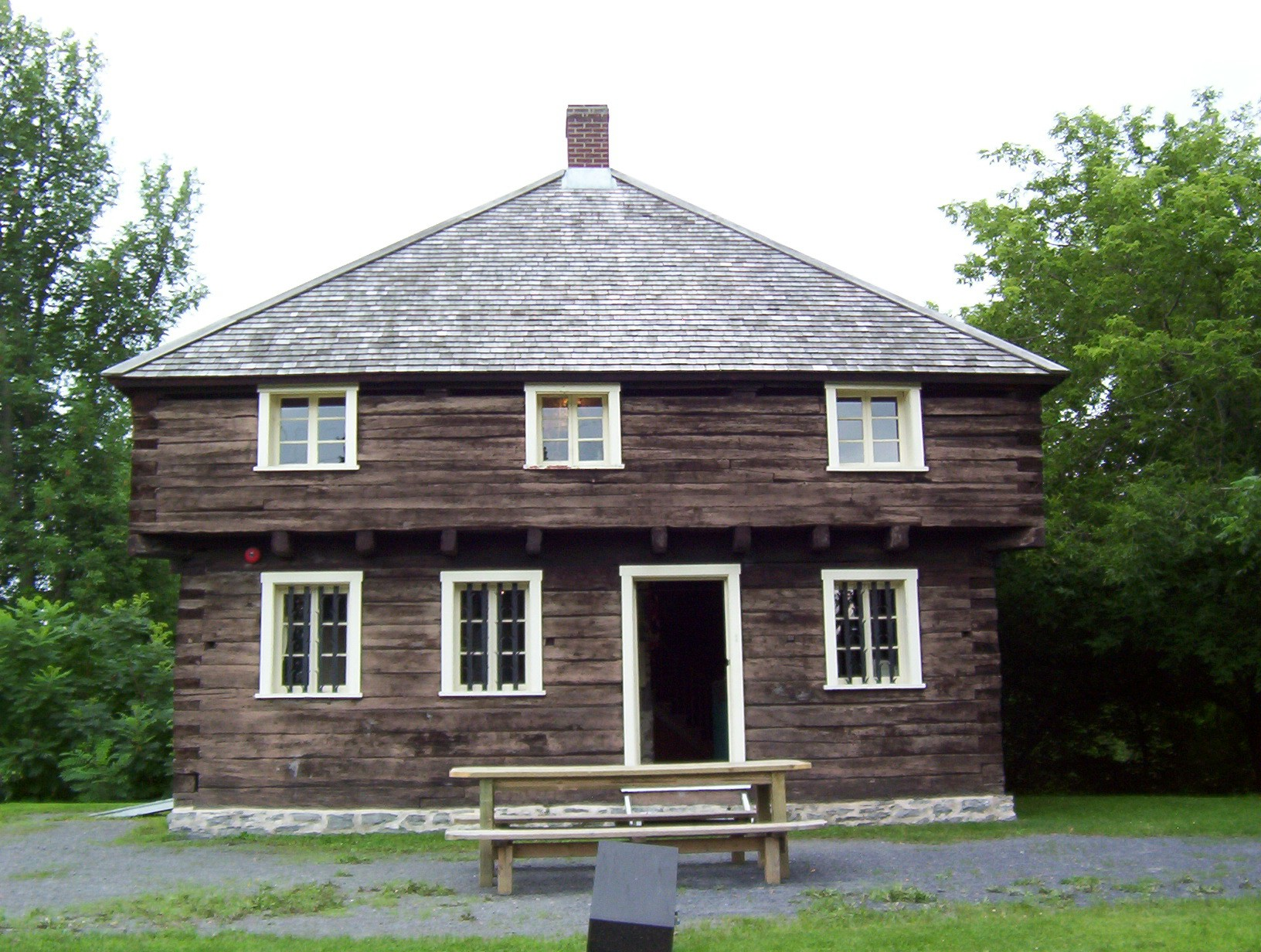
- Established: ~1781
- Location: Lacolle, Quebec
- Website: Official homepage

National Historic Site of Canada
- Designated: 1923
- Part of: Battle of Lacolle Mills (1812) Battle of Lacolle Mills (1814)

Patrimoine culturel du Québec
- Designated: 1960

Lacolle Mills Blockhouse (French: Blockhaus de la Rivière-Lacolle) is a blockhouse and museum located alongside the Lacolle River near the village of Lacolle, Quebec.

== History ==
Built around 1781, the blockhouse was part of the British colonies defensive network. While protecting both the watermill constructed of stone and the lighthouse built along the Lacolle River, the blockhouse was used as a military outpost by the British Army on assignment in the region of Le Haut-Richelieu Regional County Municipality and on Lake Champlain.

In 1923, the Lacolle Mills Blockhouse was included in the Battle of Lacolle Mills (1814) National Historic Site of Canada. In 1960, the blockhouse was designated a cultural heritage building and is entered in the Quebec Cultural Heritage Directory.

== Structure ==
The Lacolle Mills Blockhouse is a timber framed square two-storey structure. The second-level floor is cantilevered with a pavilion roof. The blockhouse is built on land that overlooks the Lacolle River. The blockhouse's architecture was typical of a small defensive military structure in the area not requiring significant experience to construct. The blockhouse walls are constructed of squared half timber stacked horizontally. The walls have loopholes, providing the occupant with protection, while firing on the enemy. In the centre of the blockhouse was a stone hearth, which provided heating. The British military constructed over 25 forts of this type in Lower Canada between 1760 and 1840.

== War of 1812 ==
During the War of 1812, the blockhouse was the location for the Battle of Lacolle Mills (1812) and the Battle of Lacolle Mills (1814).

The Battle of Lacolle Mills (1812) was a short engagement in which a small garrison of Canadien Militia, with the assistance of Kahnawake Mohawk warriors, defended the Lacolle Mills Blockhouse from an American invasion force led by Major General Henry Dearborn.

In the Battle of Lacolle Mills (1814) a garrison of 80 men of the 13th Regiment of Foot and a Congreve rocket detachment of the Royal Marine Artillery, later reinforced by a company of the Canadian Voltigeurs and the Grenadier company of the Canadian Regiment of Fencible Infantry successfully defended the blockhouse and stone watermill from an attacking American force of 4,000 men led by Major General James Wilkinson.

== Gallery ==
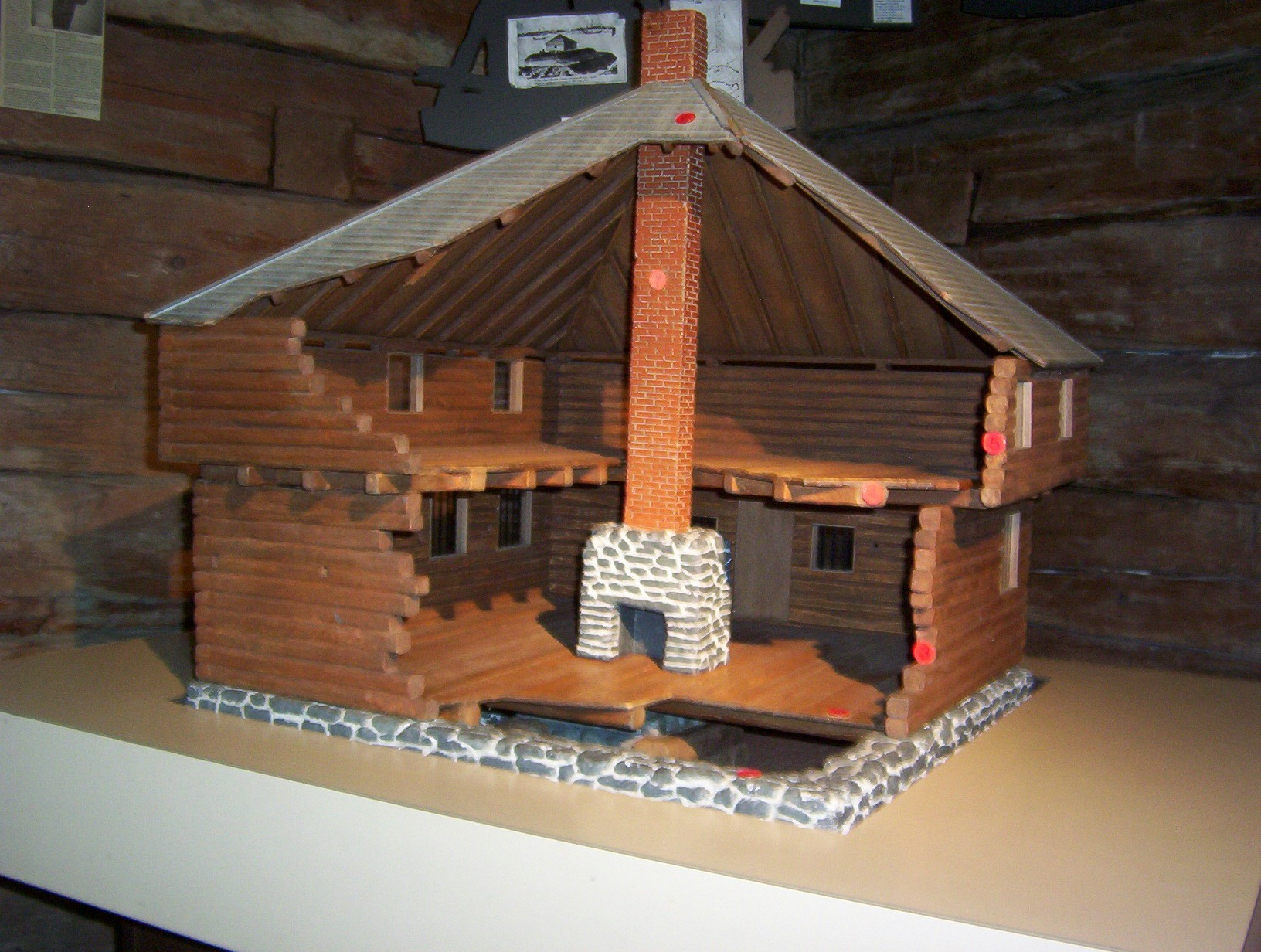

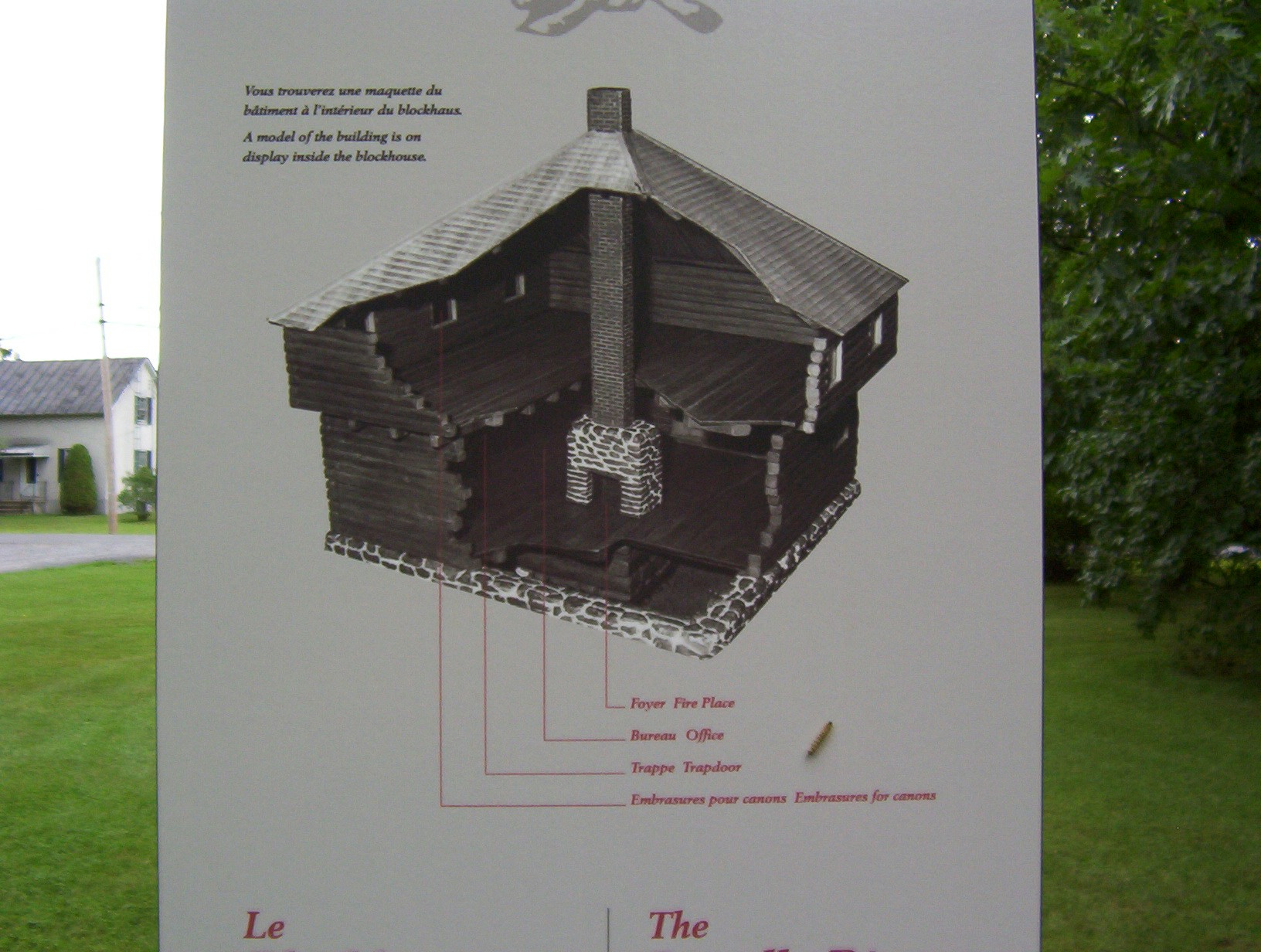

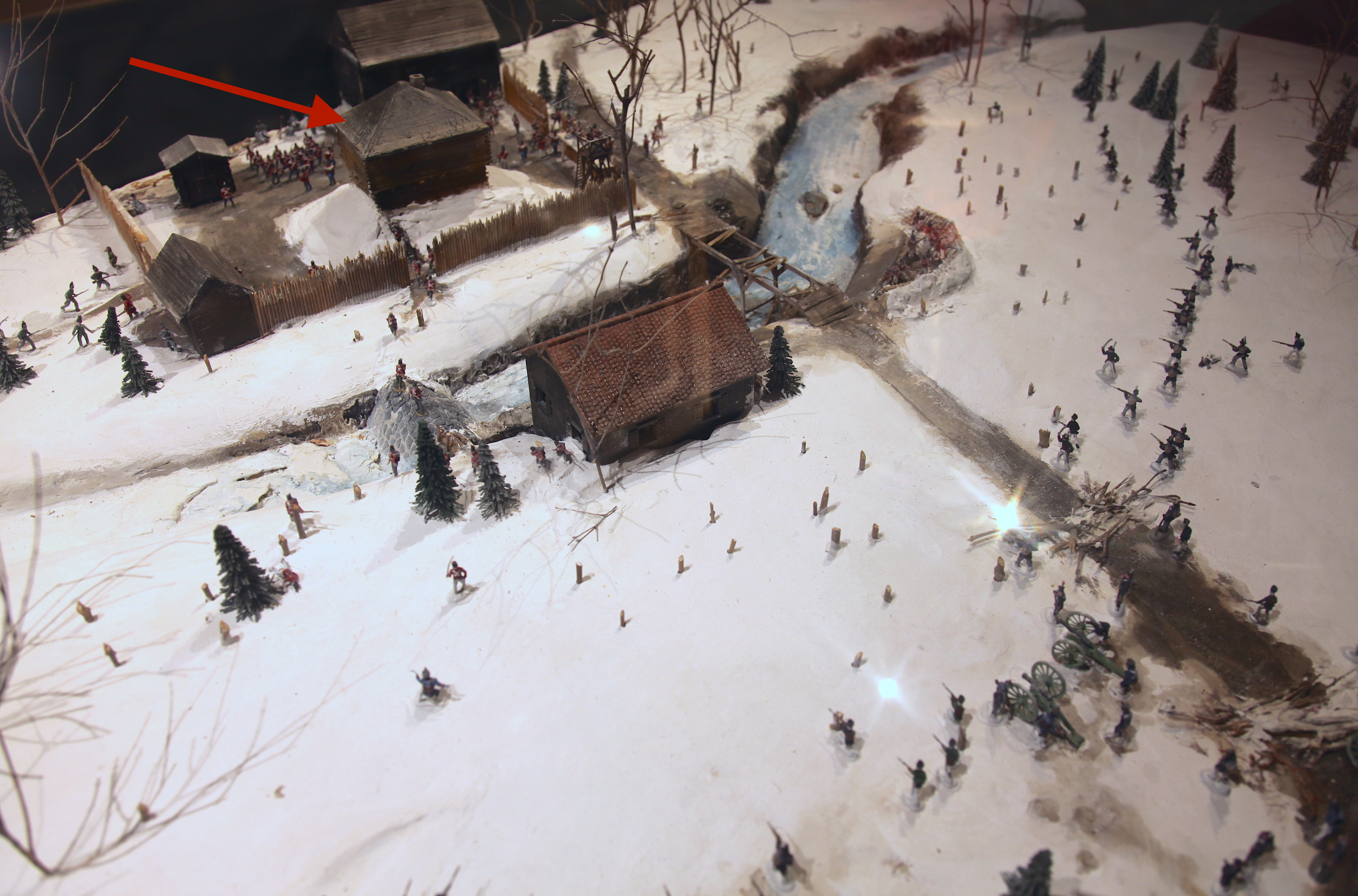
