= Fort York Guard =

Historical demonstration military unit in Toronto, Ontario

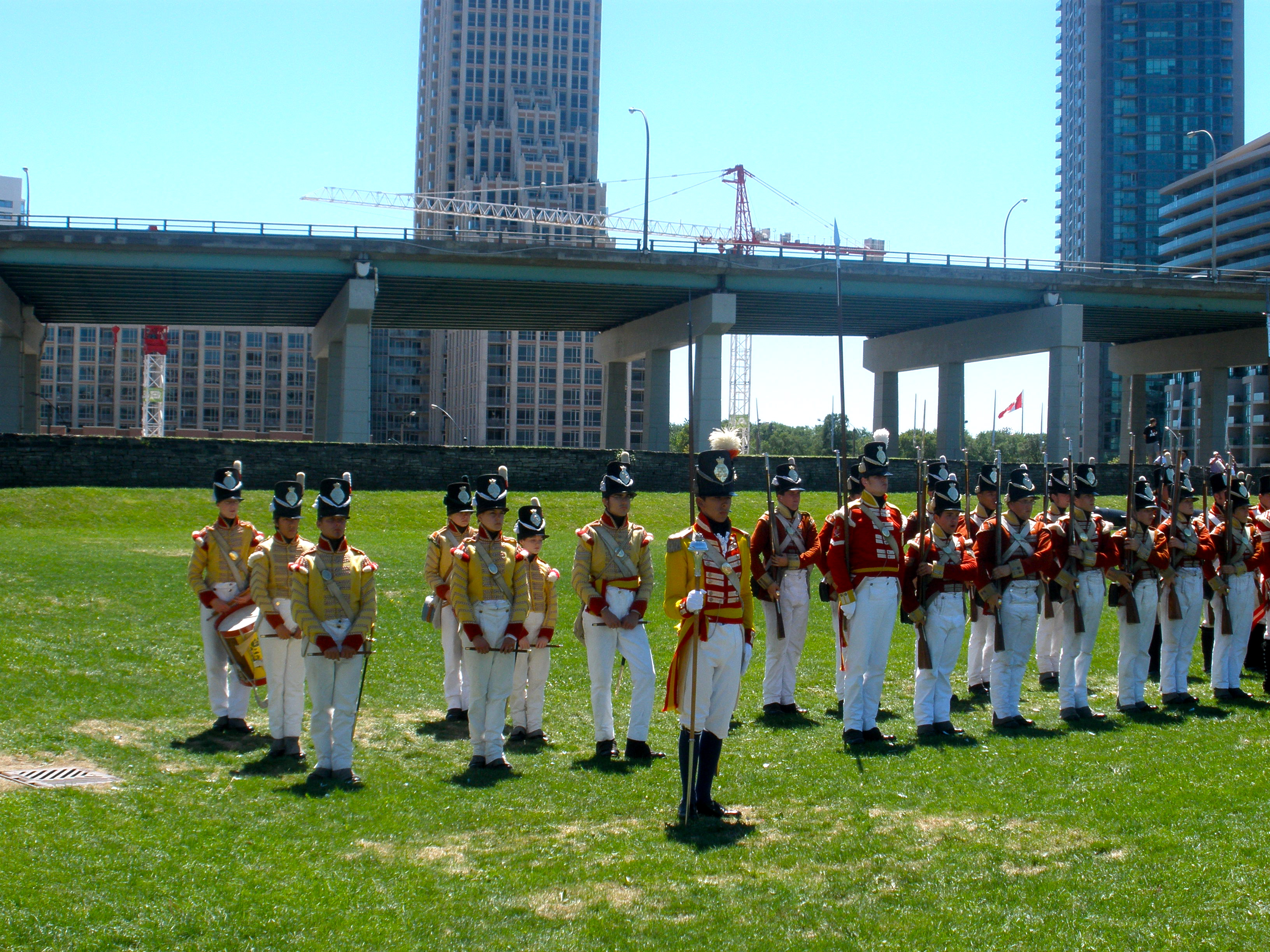
- Fort York Guard demonstration, 2012
- Active: 1934-present
- Country: Canada
- Branch: British Army (re-enactment), Canadian Fencibles
- Role: Historical Animation
- Size: 20 members
- Garrison/HQ: Fort York
- Patron: Friends of Fort York

The Fort York Guard is a historical animation unit based at Fort York in downtown Toronto. The Guard recreates the Canadian Regiment of Fencible Infantry, stationed at the fort in 1815.

Several versions of the Guard have existed since it was first created in 1934. The current Fort York Guard is employed by the non-profit organization The Friends of Fort York, and primarily consists of high school and university students from the Greater Toronto Area. The Guard performs in daily music, musket and artillery demonstrations during the summer months.

The Guard operated through the COVID-19 pandemic but was suspended by the City of Toronto in 2022, reportedly in the belief that living history displays perpetuated colonialism, and has not yet been reinstated.

== Organization ==
The Fort York Guard represents the Canadian Regiment of Fencible Infantry, stationed at the fort between February and June 1815, immediately after the War of 1812. Part of the Guard portrays the regiment's Fife and Drum Corps, playing period military music, while the remainder, forming the Squad, represent the rank-and-file of Captain Edward Cartwright's No. 2 (Grenadier) Company. A strong contingent of younger students between the ages of 11 and 16 participate in the Fife and Drums Corps' volunteer program throughout the summer.

The Drums Corps is led by a Drum Major and a Bugle Major, while the Squad is commanded by a Sergeant and Corporal.

== Events and programming ==
The Guard is active daily at the fort throughout July and August, and has performed at numerous events throughout the year across the city and beyond. Their largest events of the summer at Fort York are held on Canada Day and Simcoe Day, the Toronto civic holiday on the first Monday in August. The Guard annually attends the Fort George Fife and Drum Muster and Soldiers' Field Day in Niagara on the Lake, and frequently emerges as champion of the Drill Competition held between the staff of Ontario's War of 1812 forts. The Fort York Guard, schedule permitting, also often marches in the Canadian National Exhibition's Warriors' Day Parade.

== See also ==
- Fort Henry Guard
