= Alexander McDonell (politician) =

Canadian politician

Alexander McDonell Esquire

Member of the Legislative Assembly of Upper Canada
- In office 1834–1841 Serving with John Gilchrist, Henry Ruttan
- Monarchs: William IV of the United Kingdom, Queen Victoria
- Preceded by: Archibald Macdonald, James Lyons
- Succeeded by: John Gilchrist
- Constituency: Northumberland

Alexander McDonell, Esq. (1786 – November 29, 1861) was an immigration agent, military officer and member of the Legislative Assembly of Upper Canada. After immigrating from Scotland to Upper Canada he fought in the War of 1812 with the Canadian Fencibles. He later served as a Colonel and assembled a militia to help quell the Upper Canada Rebellion, although they were never called to action. He spent most of his professional life as a Crown agent in the area surrounding Peterborough, Ontario assigning plots of land to settlers, advocating for projects to improve the infrastructure, and settling disputes as a Justice of the Peace. He was elected to the Legislative Assembly of Upper Canada in 1834 and reelected in 1836 by relying on his reputation after helping settlers and running on a pro-British platform. He lost his election to the Legislative Assembly of the Province of Canada in 1841 and became a lumberjack after his retirement in 1843.

== Early life ==
McDonell was born in Scotland in 1786 and travelled to Canada in 1804 with his uncle Alexander Macdonell.

== Career ==
=== Military career ===
McDonell served during the War of 1812 as a Ensign in the Canadian Fencibles. He was part of the attacking British forces at the Second Battle of Sacket's Harbor.

During the Upper Canada Rebellion McDonell, by that point promoted to major, commanded the 2nd Regiment Northumberland militia. His regiment was stationed in Cobourg but was not called upon to quell the rebellion. In late 1838, McDonell was promoted to Lieutenant Colonel and given command of the newly formed 7th Provisional Battalion. He was tasked with recruiting soldiers for the battalion from the surrounding Peterborough region and hiring officers. In December 1836 the battalion was ordered to Port Hope to board a steamship for Toronto to quell the rebellion. By the time they reached Port Hope the order was rescinded.

=== Public servant career ===
McDonell was hired by Peter Robinson as a guide and then as a clerk for four years. McDonell worked as the emigration agent in the Peterborough region during Robinson's 1825 emigration plan. His responsibilities included bringing newly-arrived immigrants to the region to settle new townships, hiring workers to clear the land for these townships, and organising plots of land for hovels, amenities and businesses. He also settled boundary disputes among the settlers and mediated conflicts between the Upper Canada government and immigrants. In 1827 he became a Crown Lands agent in the Newcastle District and later for Durham County and Northumberland County.

In 1829 McDonell was chosen by Robinson to supervise settling the Ops Township. He petitioned Robinson to build a gristmill in Ops Township along Lake Scugog to avoid future businessmen from building a private mill in the area. He also hired local axemen to build homes for the settlers in the township. The construction of homes was delayed because the axemen, McDonell and many settlers to the area were infected with a fever. McDonell also managed the food rations during this fever and provided additional provisions when instructed to do so by Robinson. To improve the production of various mills and businesses McDonell lobbied the Legislative Assembly of Upper Canada to develop a route along the Trent–Severn Waterway. He served as a commissioner for the project and distributed funds for locks and dams along the route. Another responsibility as a Crown agent was organising the timber trade on crown lands. McDonell also worked as a commissioner of public projects and a justice of the peace. He retired as an agent in 1843.

=== Legislative career ===
In 1834, McDonell was elected to the Legislative Assembly of Upper Canada for Northumberland and was reelected in 1836. He campaigned as a constitutionalist and relied on his pro-British values and reputation as the citizen's land agent. He also reminded voters of his lobbying and work as a commissioner for improving travelling along the Trent–Severn Waterway. He was also a supporter of the leadership established for Upper Canada. He ran for the new Legislative Assembly of the Province of Canada in the Colborne District in 1841 as a conservative but was defeated by John Gilchrist by a large margin.

=== Lumberjack career ===
After his election loss McDonell was a lumberjack along Bonnechere River and Petawawa River.

== Personal life and death ==
McDonell was married, but the name of his wife is unknown. He was a practising Roman Catholic but was also loyal to the British monarch. He disagreed with French-speaking bishops who added democratic principles and ideas to their public school curriculum and he was shocked at the level of discontent and uprising happening in Lower Canada. He also received remuneration from the British Crown in exchange for ensuring Irish immigrants do not begin a revolt. McDonell died on November 29, 1861, at Caisse's hotel and was buried at Little Lake Cemetery. He had fallen out of favour with the church and upon his death in Peterborough in 1861 his body was refused a Roman Catholic burial.
