= Army of the North (United States) =

U.S. Army formation during the War of 1812

- Active: June 1812 – June 1815
- Country: United States
- Branch: United States Army
- Type: Field army
- Engagements: War of 1812: Battle of Lacolle Mills (1812); Battle of York; Battle of Fort George; Battle of Crysler's Farm; Battle of Plattsburgh

Commanders
- Notable commanders: Henry Dearborn

The Army of the North, also known as the Northern Army was a United States Army formation formed at the outset of the War of 1812.

== History ==
In 1812, the United States Secretary of War organized the United States Army into three field armies. These were the Army of the North, the Army of the Northwest and the Southern Army.

At the outbreak of the War of 1812, the Northern Army was under the command of Major General Henry Dearborn, a veteran of the American Revolutionary War. Dearborn planned to launch an assault on the city of Montreal. However, Dearborn's worsening heath delayed the invasion plans. On the morning of 19 November 1812, Dearborn's Adjutant General issued order: "the General embraces the earliest opportunity to express his confidence in the troops composing the army of the North. Their bravery and patriotism will supply any deficiency in military discipline and tactics which time and experience will render perfect." However, Dearborn's forces were defeated by a numerically inferior force of Canadian militia under the command of Charles de Salaberry during the subsequent First Battle of Lacolle Mills.

In 1813, John Armstrong Jr., the new Secretary of War, ordered Dearborn to launch an attack on the city of Kingston in coordination with Commodore Isaac Chauncey. However, both Dearborn and Chauncey thought that Kingston was too fortified and instead suggested to attack York, the capital of Upper Canada. On 27 April 1813, American forces of the Army of the North successfully attacked York. Brigadier General Zebulon Pike (the officer who was leading the Army of the North's landing party during the battle) stated that any American soldiers who looted civilian buildings would be executed. However, after Pike was killed during the battle by a magazine explosion, American sodiers of the Northern Army started to loot and burn the town.

In July 1813, Dearborn was relieved of command due to repeatedly suffering from illness.

The Northern Army was under the command of Major General George Izard during the Battle of Plattsburgh.

== Commanders ==
- Henry Dearborn (June 1812 - July 1813)
- James Wilkinson (July 1813 - January 1814)
- George Izard (January 1814 - 1815)

== Bibliography ==
- Blumberg, Arnold (2012). When Washington Burned: An Illustrated History of the War of 1812. Casemate. ISBN 978-1-6120-0101-2.
