= Collie (disambiguation) =

Collie or Colly may mean:

== Dogs ==
- Collie, an old type and breed of herding dog originating in the United Kingdom; the ancestor of numerous breeds and types, some (but not all) typically include the name of “collie" :
  - Shetland Sheepdog or Sheltie; also sometimes referred to as a Miniature Collie or Toy Collie
  - Bearded Collie, a type of collie that looks somewhat like an Old English sheepdog.
  - Border Collie, a collie type from the Border area of Scotland and Northern England, the most widespread herding dog
  - Koolie or German Collie, Australian Koolie, an Australian breed of herding dog
  - Scotch Collie, one of the most common names for what is now commonly called the Collie. They consist of two types:
    - Rough Collie, long-haired, made famous by the Lassie films
    - Smooth Collie, short-haired
  - Welsh Collie or Welsh Sheepdog, a landrace herding dog from Wales

== Places ==
- Colly (hill), An Bheann Mhór, a 679 m mountain in Kerry, Ireland
- Collie, New South Wales, a village and parish in Australia
- Collie, Western Australia, a town in Australia
- Collie River, a river in Western Australia
- Shire of Collie, a local government area in the South West region of Western Australia
- Mount Collie, a mountain in Yoho National Park, Canada
- Colly Township, North Carolina, a district in North Carolina, United States

== People ==
- Collie (name), a list of people with the surname, given name or nickname
- Collie Buddz (Colin Harper, born 1981), reggae and dancehall artist from Bermuda

== Other uses ==
- Operation Collie, a British Second World War naval operation in the Pacific
- Collie, a slang term for cannabis (drug)
- Collie's Squirrel (Sciurus colliaei), a Mexican species of squirrel
- Collie Street, Fremantle, Western Australia

== See also ==
- Coalie (disambiguation)
- Coley (surname)
- Coll
- Coll (disambiguation)
- Colley (disambiguation)
- Longus colli muscle
