= Colles =

Colles may refer to:

- Abraham Colles (1773–1843), Irish professor of anatomy
- Christopher Colles (1739–1816), engineer and inventor
- Colles' fracture, a fracture of the distal radius bone
- Fascia of Colles, serves to bind down the muscles of the root of the penis
- Plural of collis, a term used in planetary nomenclature to refer to small hills or knobs
