= Ferdinand-Alphonse Oklowski =

Ferdinand-Alphonse Oklowski (Polish: Ferdynand Alfons Oklowski) was a military officer of Polish origin. As a colonel, he took part in the second uprising of the Lower Canada Rebellions as he commanded the Patriote forces in the Battle of Lacolle, on November 6 and November 7, 1838. The Patriote won the first skirmish of November 6 but lost the final confrontation the next day.

== See also ==
- Patriote movement
- Quebec nationalism
- Quebec independence movement
- History of Quebec
- Timeline of Quebec history
