= Stéphanie Colvey =

Canadian photographer

- Born: 1949 (age 75–76); Montreal, Quebec
- Known for: Photographer
- Website: stephaniecolvey.com

Stéphanie Colvey (born 1949) is a Canadian photographer.

Her work is included in the collections of the Musée national des beaux-arts du Québec, the Winnipeg Art Gallery and the National Gallery of Canada. The Canadian Museum of History added 128 of Colvey's photographs that documented the arrival of refugees of the Syrian civil war in Montreal in the late 2010s to is collection in 2018/2019 "develop a collection that best reflects Canada’s history and distinctiveness."

Colvey has had an ongoing focus on refugees, and in 2021, the Notre-Dame-des-Sept-Douleurs church held an exhibit of Colvey's photos dedicated to welcoming refugees.
