= Richard Colley =

Richard Colley may refer to:

- Richard Colley (rugby league), rugby league player of the 2000s
- Richard Colley (cricketer) (1833–1902), English cricketer and British Army officer
- Richard Bowen Colley (1819–1875), mayor of Glenelg, South Australia
