= McColley =

McColley is a surname. Notable people with the surname include:

- Rob McColley (born 1984), American politician

== See also ==
- McCulley
