= Canadian Regiment of Fencible Infantry =

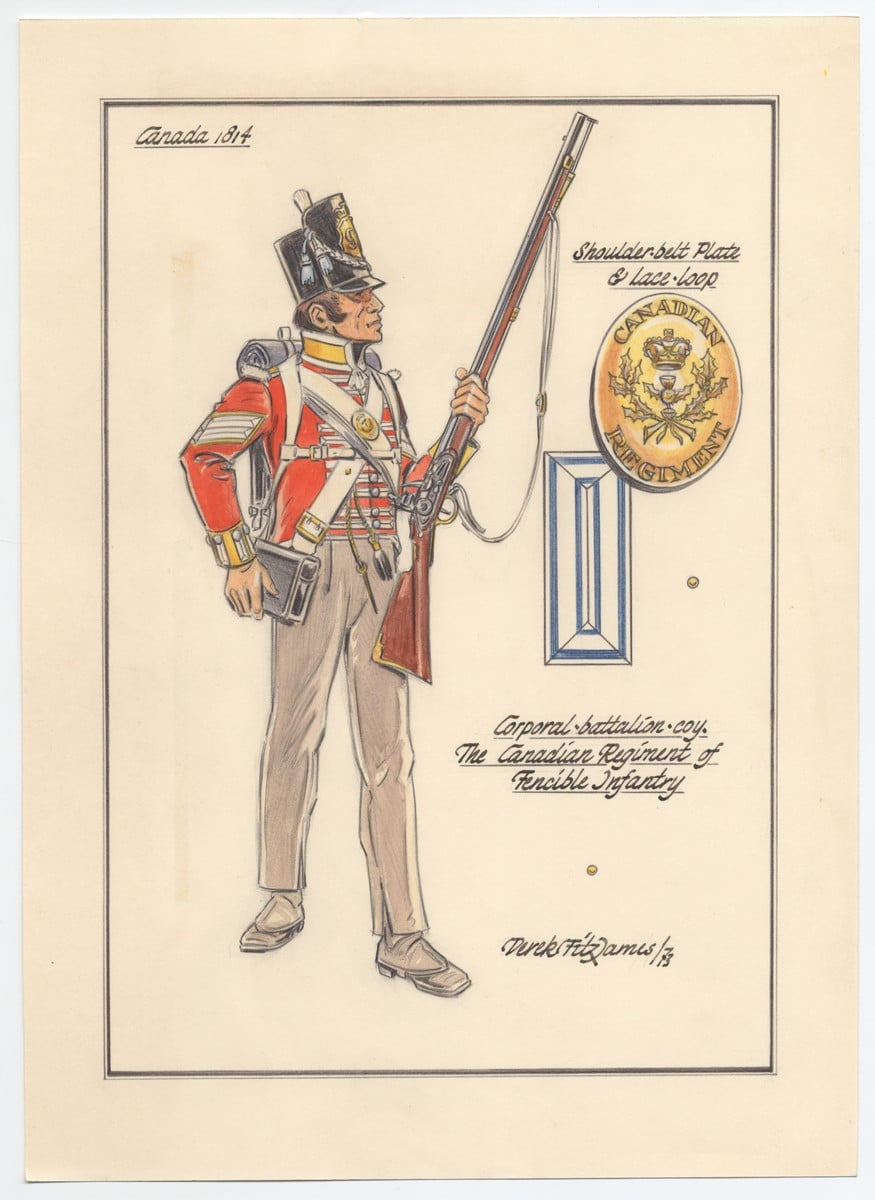
- Illustration of a corporal of the regiment in 1814
- Active: 1803–1816
- Country: Canadas
- Allegiance: British Empire
- Branch: Fencibles
- Role: Line infantry
- Garrison/HQ: Upper Canada and Lower Canada
- Engagements: War of 1812: Battle of the Châteauguay; Battle of Crysler's Farm; Salmon River Raid (1814); Battle of Lacolle Mills (1814)

The Canadian Regiment of Fencible Infantry, commonly known as the Canadian Regiment or the Canadian Fencibles, was a fencible regiment of line infantry raised in 1803. Initially formed in Scotland from Scottish Highlanders intending on emigrating to Canada, misunderstandings regarding the terms of enlistment and false rumours that the regiment would be sent to India led to a mutiny that resulted in most of the unit's other ranks being discharged in 1804. The regiment's officers and remaining other ranks were sent to Canada, where they reconstituted the unit with local recruits. Following the outbreak of the War of 1812, the regiment saw service in Upper and Lower Canada before being disbanded in 1816 following the end of the war a year earlier.

== History ==
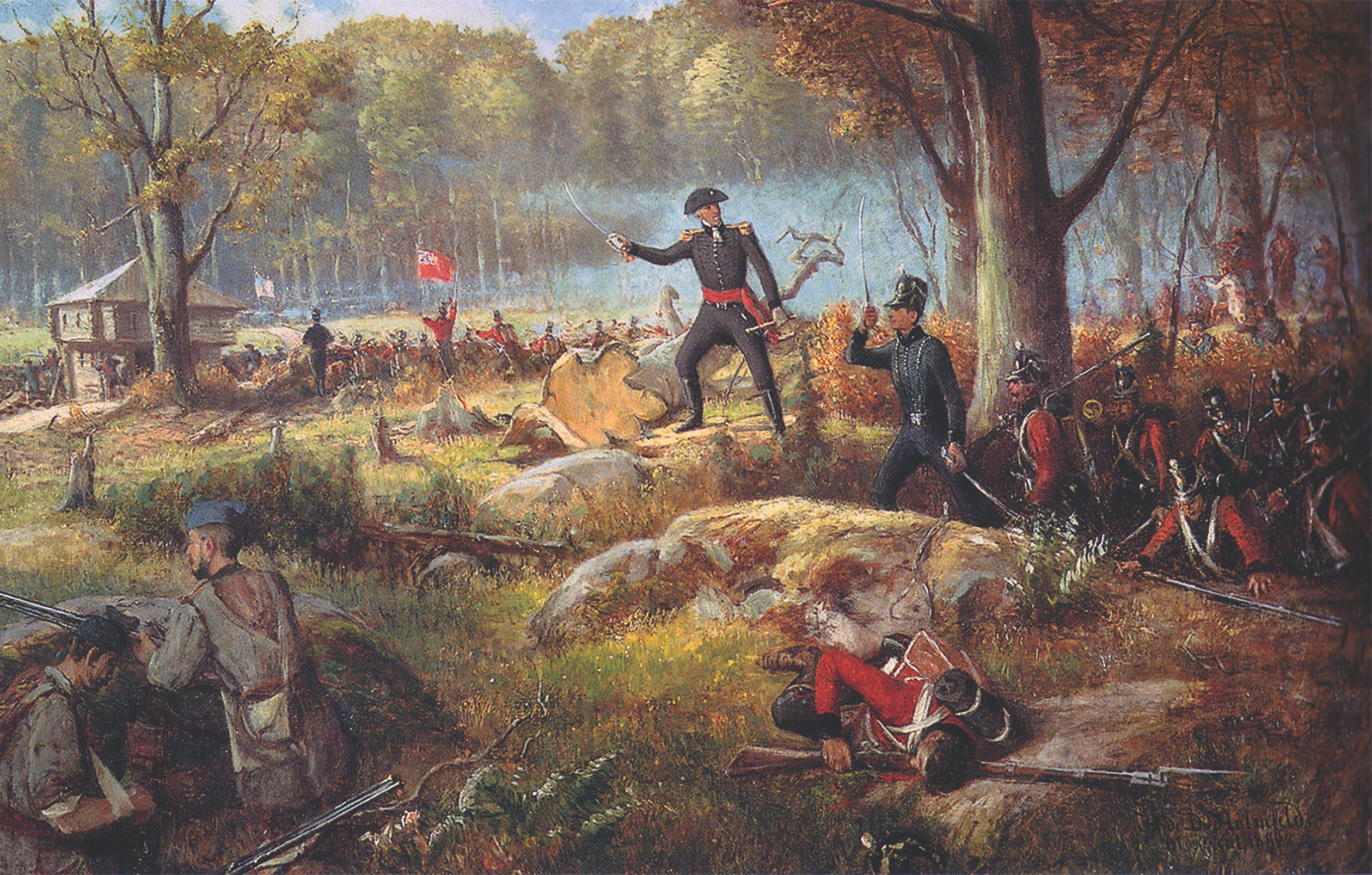
The Battle of the Chateauguay, which the regiment fought in

The regiment was originally raised in Scotland in 1803, drawing its ranks from Scottish Highlanders intending on emigrating to Canada. The unit was to see service only in British North America, however, misunderstandings regarding the terms of enlistment and rumours that the regiment would be sent to India caused the recruits to mutiny in Glasgow. In response, the men were all discharged in the fall of 1804. Subsequently, the commissioned officers and a skeleton crew of other ranks were sent to re-raise the regiment in the Canadas.

Initially, the commissioned and non-commissioned officers were Scottish while the core of the regiment would be French and English-speaking Canadians. Of the English-speaking Canadians who enlisted, many were the sons of Loyalists from the Thirteen Colonies, or were themselves 'late Loyalists' who had come more recently from the young United States. The regiment also had significant numbers of English-, Irish-, and German-born troops, most of whom had likely emigrated permanently in the years leading up to the outbreak of the war. Intriguingly, the regiment also had a Baltic German drummer-boy born in Riga in its ranks, and evidence from an honourable regimental discharge paper has suggested that there was also one soldier among them who had been born in Finland. The Scottish roots of the regiment are evident in the regiment's coat of arms with a thistle. The regiment was reestablished in Montreal in 1803, but did not begin recruitment until 1805.

By the start of the War of 1812, the regiment's strength was at 600 men. The regiment was involved in several battles, including the Battle of Châteauguay, Battle of Crysler's Farm, Battle of Lacolle Mills. The Canadian Regiment was disbanded in July and August 1816 at Kingston and Montreal.

The Canadian Fencibles first received significant modern attention when historian John Prebble featured the regiment's 1804 mutiny in his 1975 book Mutiny: Highland Regiments in Revolt. Canadian historian Robert Henderson also explored the history of the unit in a series of articles, several of which appeared in Military Illustrated in 1991. More recently, Eamonn O'Keeffe has written about the regiment's fife and drum corps and band. In an article for Canadian Military History, O'Keeffe also shed light on the inner workings of the regiment through analysis of the court martial of Canadian Fencibles Lieutenant John de Hertel, who was tried for assaulting a fellow officer in Fort York's Blue Barracks in 1815.

== Perpetuations ==
The lineage of the unit is perpetuated by the Canadian Army's Royal 22^{e} Régiment, which carries the battle honours awarded to the Canadian Regiment of Fencible Infantry in commemoration of the unit.

== Reenactment ==
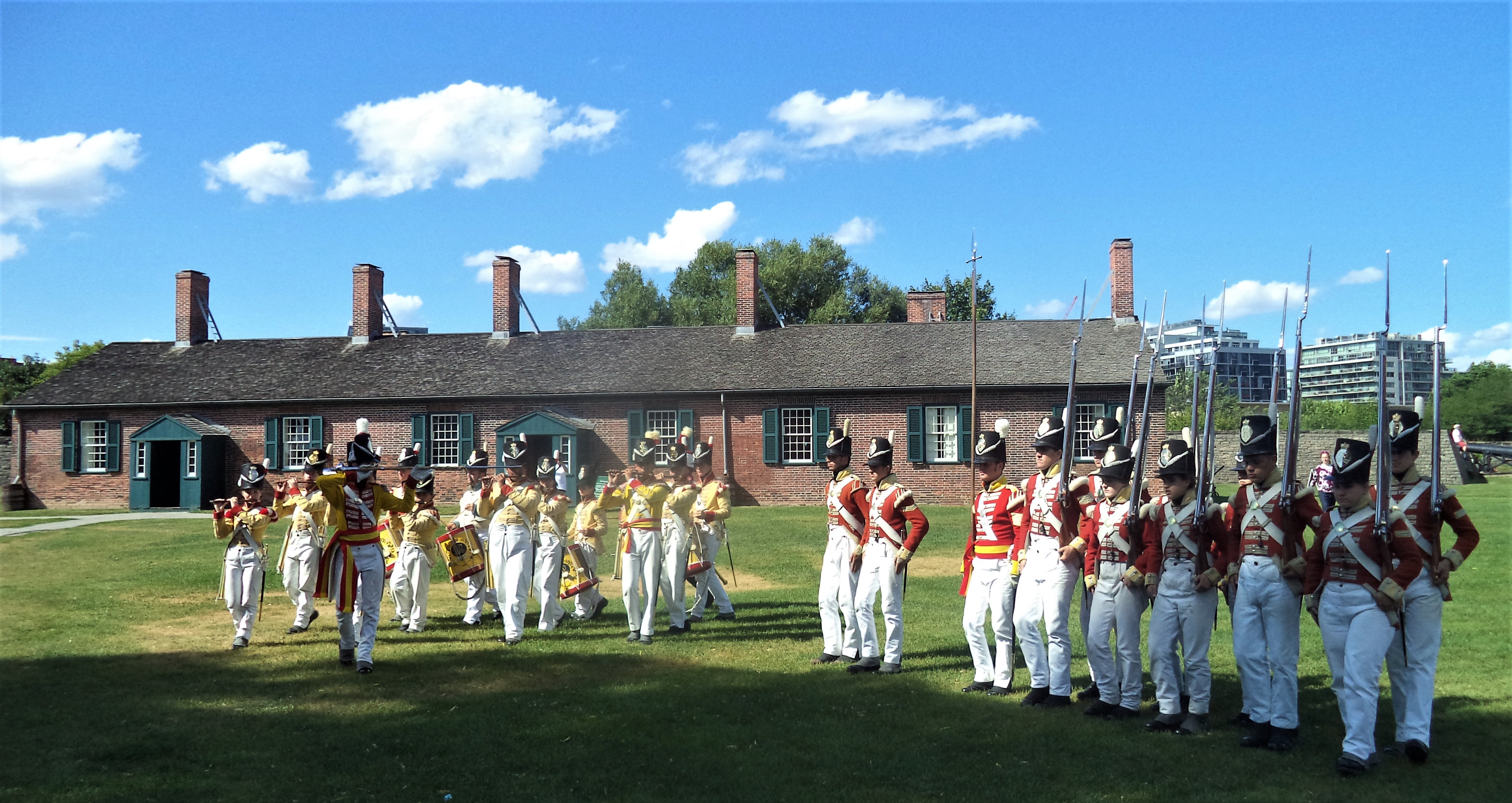
Members of the Fort York Guard in 2015

Reenactments of the unit began in 1984, with both military and civilian displays, across Canada and the United States. Participating in recreated battles, youth events and festivals across the country, the group's membership continues to grow with new elements, such as civilian portrayals, artillery and naval elements, being added and expanded.

The Friends of Fort York hired students to recreate the regiment at Fort York in Toronto, Ontario during the summer months until 2022. This group was known as the Fort York Guard. At the Scout Brigade of Fort George each September, the sub-camp for youth of the Cub Scout program also recreate the regiment.

== Notable Members ==
- Captain Francis Cockburn
- Ensign Benjamin Holmes
- Ensign Alexander McDonell
- Quartermaster Alexander Fraser

== Sources ==
- O'Keeffe, Eamonn (2020). "The Anatomy of a Drum Corps: Drummers and Musicians in the Canadian Regiment of Fencible Infantry, 1803-1816". Journal of the Society for Army Historical Research. 98: 41–57.
- O'Keeffe, Eamonn (Autumn 2016). "Such Want of Gentlemanly Conduct: The General Court Martial of Lieutenant John de Hertel". Journal of Canadian Military History.
- Henderson, Robert (1991). "His Majesty's Canadian Regiment of Fencible Infantry". Military Illustrated Past and Present. #37.
- Prebble, John (1975). Mutiny: Highland Regiments in Revolt, 1743-1804. Secker & Warburg.

== See also ==
- Canadian units of the War of 1812
