= Robert Colley =

Robert Colley may refer to:

- Robert Colley (boxer) (born 1954), New Zealand boxer
- Robert Colley (pirate) (died 1698), English pirate and privateer active near Newfoundland and the Indian Ocean
- Robert Cowley (judge) (c. 1470–1546), or Colley, English-born judge in Ireland
