= Colley, Virginia =

Unincorporated community in Virginia, United States

Coordinates: 37°09′14″N 82°14′44″W

Colley is an unincorporated community in Dickenson County, Virginia, United States.

== History ==
Colley was named for the Colley family of pioneer settlers.
