= Henry Colley =

Henry Colley may refer to:

- Henry Colley (MP for Monaghan)
- Henry Colley (died 1584), Irish soldier and landowner
- Henry Colley (died 1719) (1648–1719), MP for County Kildare
- Henry Colley (died 1723) (c. 1685–1723/24), MP for Strabane
- Harry Colley (1891–1972), Irish Fianna Fáil politician
