= William Cookesley =

English classical scholar and cleric

Personal information
- Full name: William Gifford Cookesley
- Born: 1 December 1802; Brasted, Kent, England
- Died: 16 August 1880 (aged 77)

Domestic team information
- Years: Team
- 1822–1827: Cambridge University
- Source: CricketArchive, 31 March 2013

William Gifford Cookesley (1 December 1802 – 16 August 1880) was an English classical scholar and cleric.

== Life ==
He was born at Brasted in Kent, and was educated at Eton College and at King's College, Cambridge, where he graduated B.A. in 1825, M.A. in 1827. He was one of the assistant masters at Eton for many years.

In 1857, Cookesley was appointed vicar of Hayton, East Riding of Yorkshire, and became incumbent of St. Peter's, Hammersmith, in 1860, and rector of Tempsford, Bedfordshire, in 1868. He died on 16 August 1880.

== Works ==
Cookesley's publications on classical subjects were:

- Selections from Pindar. With English Notes, 1838.
- Pindari Carmina. Notas quasdam Anglice scriptas adjecit G.G.C., 1844, (another edition, pars prima, 1850, and an edition in 2 vols., 1851).
- Selecta e Catullo (with notes), 1845.
- Account and Map of the Ancient City of Rome, 1850; and a similar Account and Map of Ancient Athens, 1851 (also 1852).
- Selecta e Propertio (with notes), 1851.
- Eton Selections from Ovid and Tibullus (with notes), 1859 (another edition, 1860).
- Cæsar's Gallic War (with English notes), 1861.

Cookesley also published:

- Sermons, London, 1843; and Old Windsor Sermons, London, 1844.
- A revised translation of the New Testament, 1859.
- A few Remarks on some of the more prominent errors contained in Bishop Colenso's Book on the Pentateuch, London, 1863.
- Memorial Sketch of F. J. Cookesley, edited by W. G. C., 1867.
- Various pamphlets published between 1845 and 1867.

== Cricket career ==
Cookesley was a cricketer associated with Cambridge University, active from 1822 to 1827. He is recorded in 4 matches, totalling 34 runs with a highest score of 30, holding no catches and taking 2 wickets.

== Bibliography ==
- Haygarth, Arthur (1996) [1862]. Scores & Biographies, Volume 1 (1744–1826). Kennington: Frederick Lillywhite. ISBN 978-19-00592-23-9.
- Haygarth, Arthur (1997) [1862]. Scores & Biographies, Volume 2 (1827–1840). Kennington: Frederick Lillywhite. ISBN 978-19-00592-23-9.

Attribution

This article incorporates text from a publication now in the public domain: Stephen, Leslie, ed. (1887). "Cookesley, William Gifford". Dictionary of National Biography. Vol. 12. London: Smith, Elder & Co.
