= La Colle Falls Hydroelectric Dam =

Abandoned hydroelectric dam in Saskatchewan, Canada

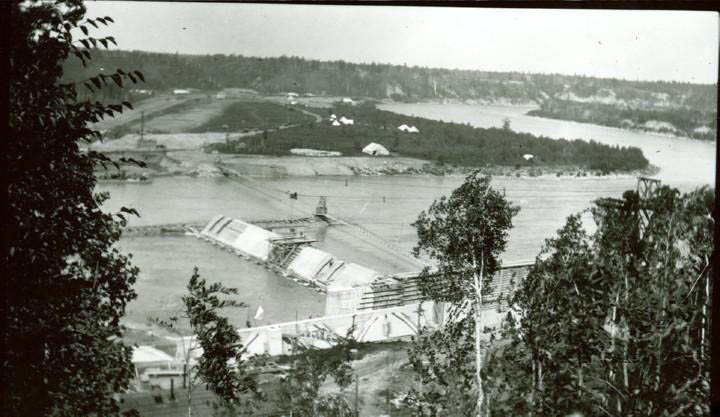
- La Colle Falls Hydroelectric Dam in 1916
- Country: Canada
- Location: Garden River No. 490 / Prince Albert No. 461, east of Prince Albert, Saskatchewan
- Coordinates: 53°15′27″N 105°12′25″W
- Status: Abandoned
- Owner: City of Prince Albert

Thermal power station
- Primary fuel: Hydroelectric

Power generation
- Nameplate capacity: 0 MW

La Colle Falls Hydroelectric Dam is a partially complete hydroelectric dam built on the North Saskatchewan River near the city of Prince Albert, Saskatchewan. The dam is approximately 45 kilometres (28 mi) east of the city in an area that is quite accessible. Construction started in 1909 and the partially completed project was abandoned in 1913 due to high costs and technical difficulties. The motivation of building the dam was to provide cheap power and attract business to the area. The partially complete project had cost nearly $3 million and nearly bankrupted the city in the process.

The site is named after fur trader John Cole, who established a trading post near the rapids in 1776.

In 2009, a proposal was made to conduct an archeological assessment of the site and propose the site be made a historic site. Prince Albert Tourism was also considering developing a tour to the site using water access. In 2007, an engineering thesis was written outlining how the site could be converted into a spa.

== See also ==
- List of dams and reservoirs in Canada
