= Colley (given name) =

Colley is a masculine given name. Notable people with the name include:

- Colley Cibber (1671–1757), English actor-manager
- Colley Harman Scotland (1818–1903), first Chief Justice of the Madras High Court in India

== See also ==
- Collie (name)
