= Coley Building =

- U.S. National Register of Historic Places
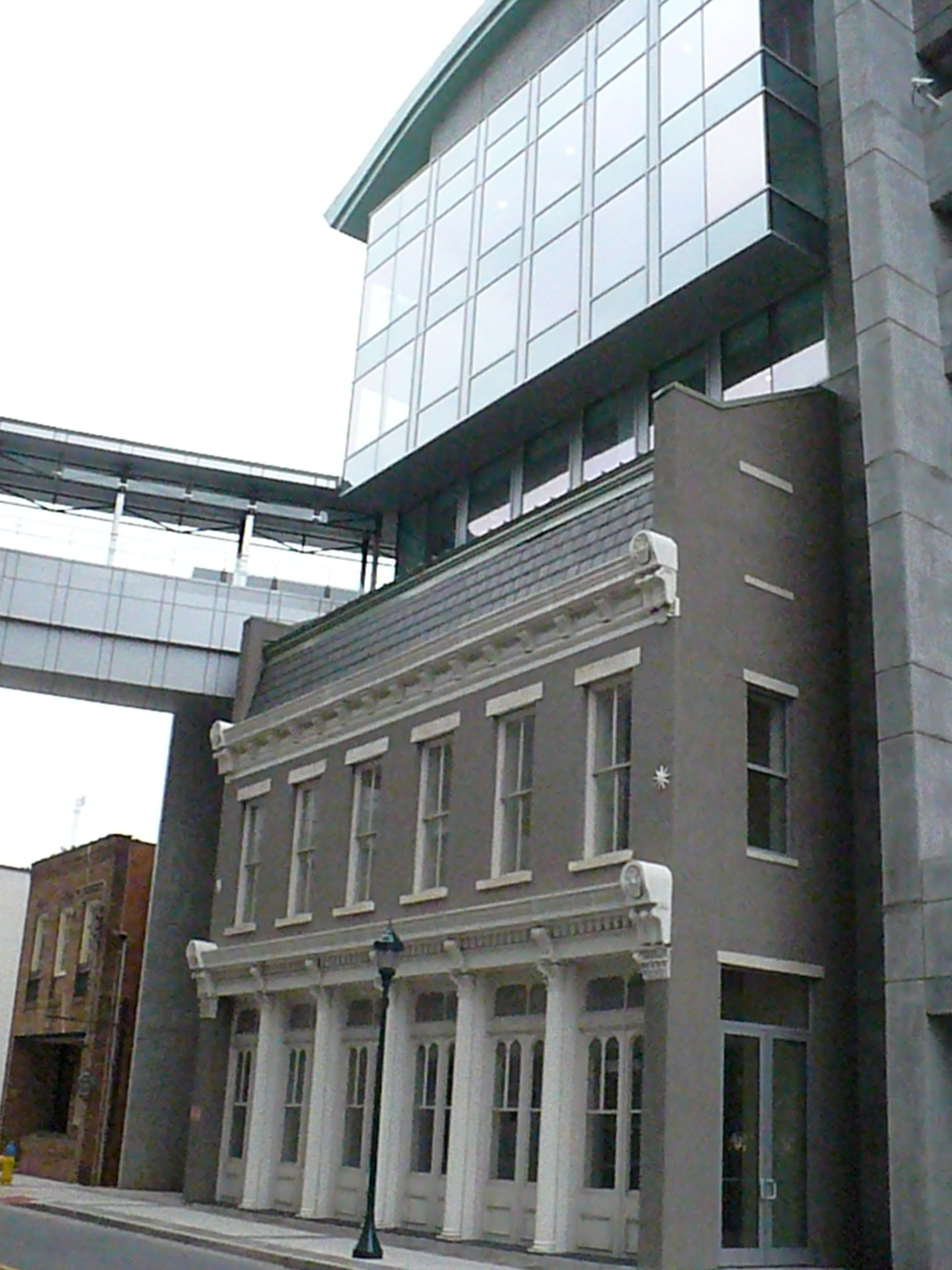
- The Coley Building facade in 2009

- Location within Mobile, Alabama Location within Alabama Location within the United States
- Location: 56 St. Francis Street; Mobile, Alabama, United States
- Coordinates: 30°41′37″N 88°2′25″W
- Built: 1836
- Architectural style: Federal, Beaux-Arts
- NRHP reference No.: 82001611
- Added to NRHP: October 22, 1982

The Coley Building was a historic two-story commercial building in Mobile, Alabama, United States. It began as a one-story Federal style masonry structure in 1836. It was the last 19th century building to survive on its city block. The block, situated between the streets of St. Francis, Royal, Water, and St. Michael, was a center for many of Mobile's brokerage firms prior to the American Civil War. The building was seized by the Confederate government during the war from a suspected Union collaborator. It was enlarged and remodeled in the 1870s, with the addition of a second floor and the application of a Beaux-Arts-influenced cast iron facade.

The building was placed on the National Register of Historic Places on October 22, 1982. It was demolished in 2003 to make way for a parking deck to serve the RSA Battle House Tower, located across the street. The cast iron architectural details were saved by Retirement Systems of Alabama (RSA) and later restored by Robinson Iron of Alexander City, Alabama. The front facade of the building was then rebuilt and grafted onto the modern parking garage in 2006.
