= Lacolle River =

Location
- Country: Province of Quebec, Canada

Physical characteristics
- Mouth
  - location: Richelieu River at Lacolle
  - coordinates: 45.06667°N 73.33167°W

The Lacolle River flows in the municipality of Lacolle, Quebec, in Le Haut-Richelieu Regional County Municipality, Montérégie, on the south shore of St. Lawrence River in Quebec in Canada. The economy of the watershed is primarily agricultural (including orchards) and recreation and tourism including the popular Safari park of Hemmingford which began operating in 1972, the country club golf course and three ciders.

== Geography ==
This small river has its source from several streams on the eastern edge of the Hemmingford township. It flows from west to east in agricultural environments and watered streams including :

- the north shore : McLelland, "de la grande décharge" (the large landfill), Duquette, Savage and Richard Gervais;
- of the South Shore : O'Connor, Poirier and Beaver Meadow.

This small river runs through the Safari Park of Hemmingford township, in the row "9th Concession South Area", heading north, then east to cross the Quebec Autoroute 15. Then the river turns north-east. After cutting the Canadian National Railway track at 5.45 kilometres (3.39 mi) west of the Richelieu River, the Lacolle River runs directly east, in parallel (north side) to the Quebec Route 202 and the railway. It passes through the village of Lacolle by a large coil, then flows into the Richelieu River by its western shore, 4.8 kilometres (3.0 mi) north of the border Canada – United States. Its mouth is at the edge of the ranks "1e Concession du Le Domaine" (1st Concession of Le Domaine) and "Concession on the Richelieu River", in the former municipality of the parish of Notre-Dame-du-Mont-Carmel which merged into the municipality of Lacolle in 2001. Its mouth is in a flood zone, at the height of the Ash Island, which is attached to the municipality of Noyan, on opposite side (on the east bank of the Richelieu River)

== History ==
Its geographical position near the mouth north of Lake Champlain, and is a tributary of the Richelieu River, the watershed of the Lacolle River was a strategic area of military plans and river trade.

Sector Lacolle River served as the first line of defense of Montreal in 1812 as British, Canadian and Mokawks faced the American soldiers defending the border of Canada.

The origin of the New France, this area was within the Government of Montreal. Several dams were built on the Lacolle River to enable sawmills and flour and facilitate log drives floating logs on the water.

== Toponyms ==
The name " Lacolle River" probably originated at least the 18th century the old name of "mountain to Romeo". Located in the southwest of the mouth of the Lacolle River, 5.5 kilometres (3.4 mi) (direct line) from the Richelieu River, this hill is called "Colle" (glue) in the 18th century. This dialect is derived from the Latin "collis" hill. Moreover, as "Colle" (glue) is mostly used in Provence in France. With the popular practice in the Haut-Richelieu, the definite French article "La" (the) and the word "colle" were merged.

In 1733, a manor of two leagues front (9.6 miles) deep with three (14.4 km) on the Richelieu River, is granted to Louis Denys de La Ronde (1675 to 1741). In 1741, the concession is withdrawn and attached to the King's domain because its obligations Lord had not been met. March 22, 1743, the manor was granted to his son Daniel Lienard de Beaujeu. For the first time, the place name of the river is mentioned in the act of concession: "... an extended two leagues of land in front of three leagues deep .... in which land is the river called the Colle ... ". The course of the river "la colle" (the glue) appears on two cards from the late French Regime, the one compiled by Nicolas Bellin (1744) and the other by Franquet (1752).

The name "Lacolle River" was formalized on December 5, 1968, at the Bank of place names in Geographical Names Board of Canada.

== See also ==
- Le Haut-Richelieu Regional County Municipality
- Lacolle Mills Blockhouse
- Battle of Lacolle Mills (1812)
- Battle of Lacolle Mills (1814)
- List of rivers of Quebec
