= Colley =

Colley may refer to:

- Colley (given name), a masculine given name
- Colley (surname), a surname
- Colley, Virginia, United States
- Colley Township, Sullivan County, Pennsylvania, United States

== See also ==
- Colley Matrix, a computer-generated sports rating system
- Colley Report, an Irish Government paper on same-sex partnership
- McColley
- Kolley (disambiguation)
