= Lacolle, Quebec =

Lacolle
- Municipality
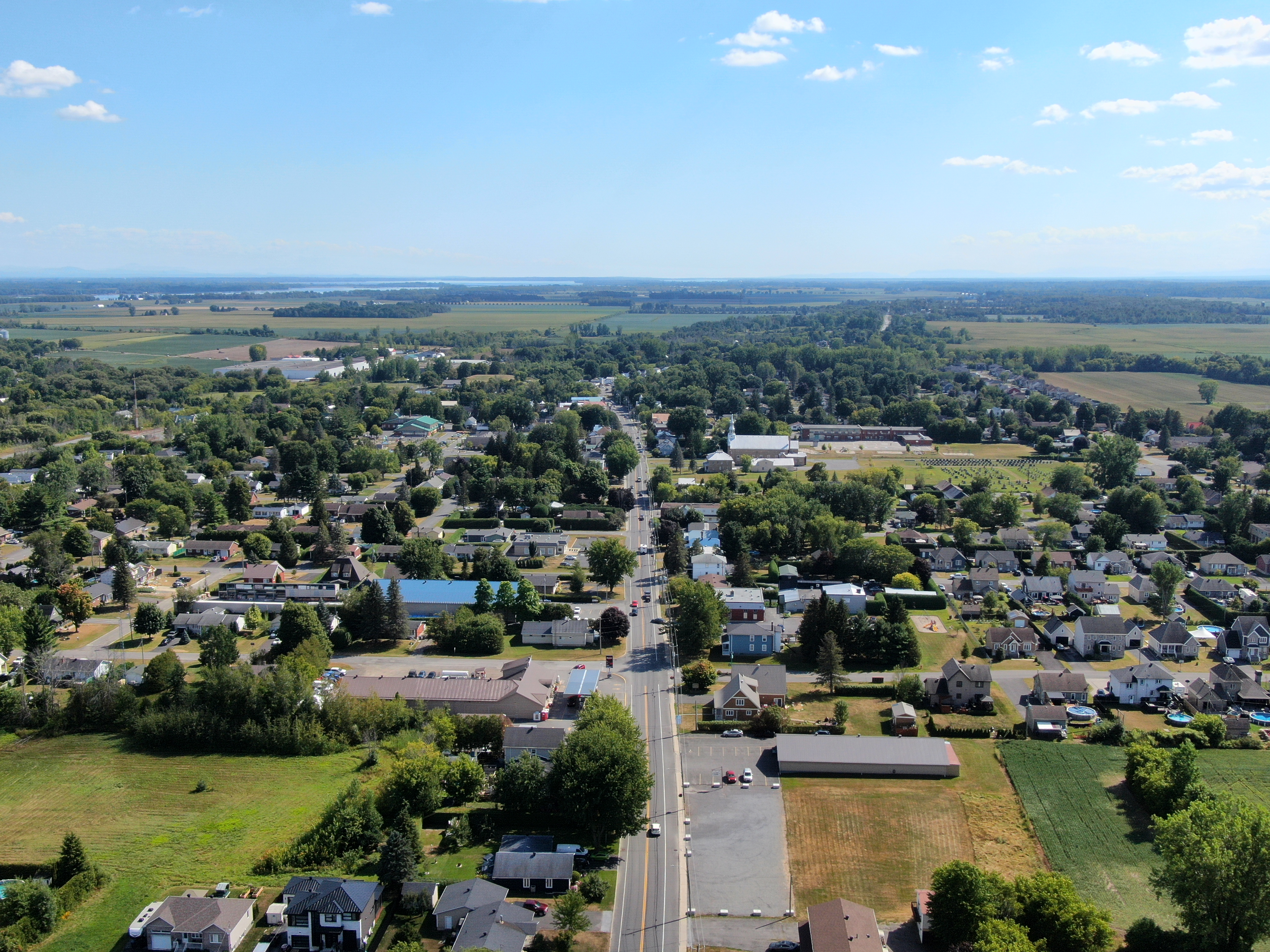
- Aerial view of Lacolle

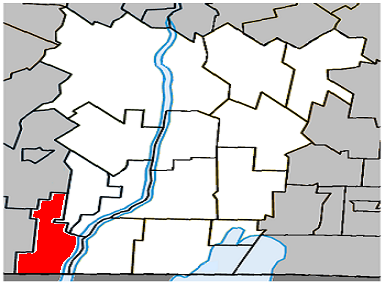
- Location within Le Haut-Richelieu RCM

- Location within southern Quebec
- Coordinates: 45°05′N 73°22′W
- Country: Canada
- Province: Quebec
- Region: Montérégie
- RCM: Le Haut-Richelieu
- Constituted: September 13, 2001

Government
  - Mayor: Jacques Lemaistre-Caron
  - Federal riding: Saint-Jean
  - Prov. riding: Huntingdon

Area
  - Total: 53.50 km^{2} (20.66 sq mi)
  - Land: 49.41 km^{2} (19.08 sq mi)

Population (2021)
  - Total: 2,708
  - Density: 54.8/km^{2} (142/sq mi)
  - Pop 2016-2021: ▲4.3%
  - Dwellings: 1,278
- Time zone: UTC−5 (EST)
  - Summer (DST): UTC−4 (EDT)
- Postal code(s): J0J 1J0
- Area codes: 450 and 579
- Highways: R-221; R-223; R-202
- Website: www.lacolle.com

Lacolle (French pronunciation: [lakɔl]) is a municipality in southern Quebec, Canada, located in the administrative area of the Montérégie, on the Canada–United States border. The population as of the Canada 2021 Census was 2,708. The Lacolle River runs eastward through the middle of the town and empties in Richelieu River. The nearest town across the border is Champlain, New York.

== History ==
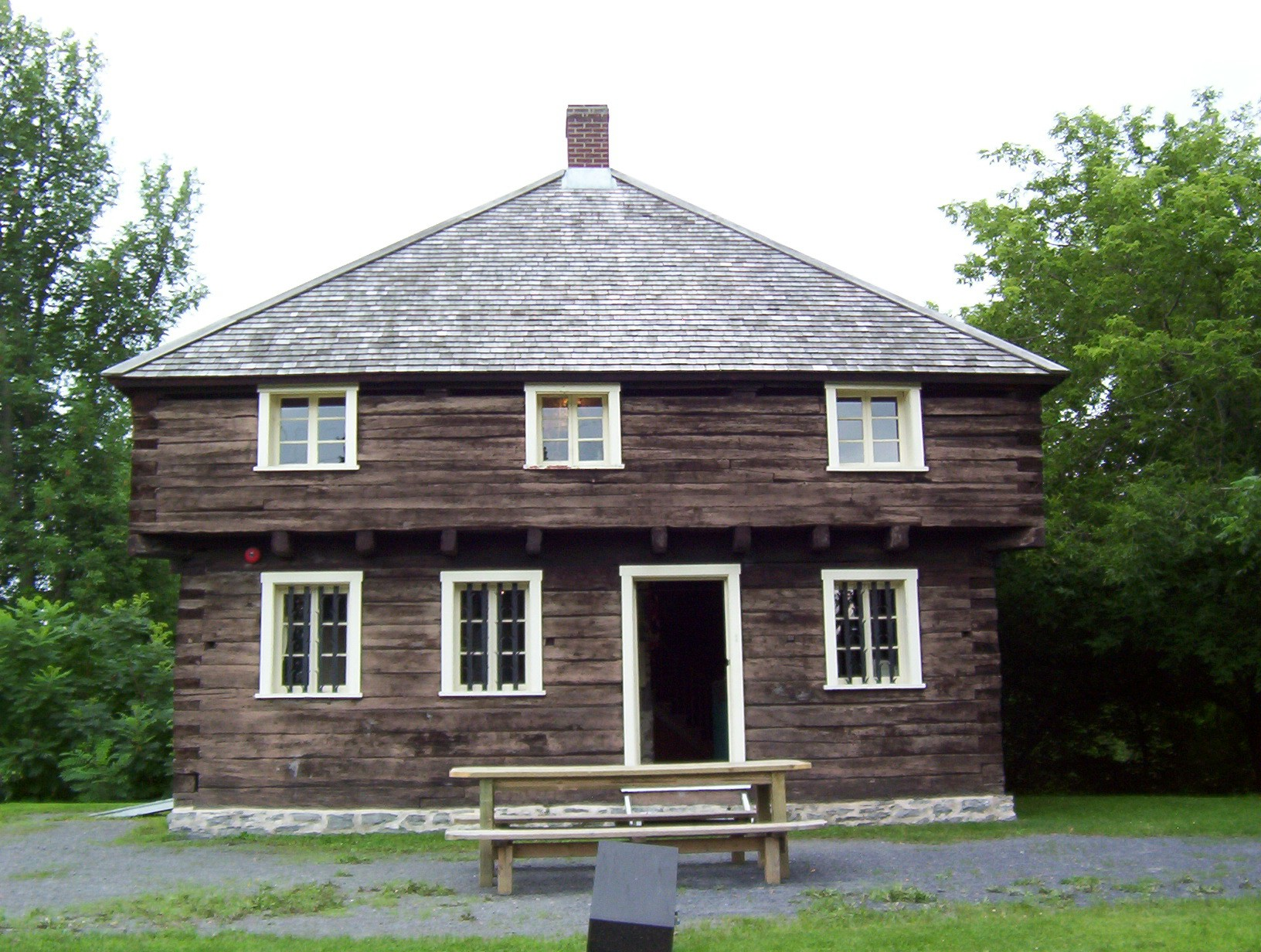
Lacolle Mills Blockhouse

The written history of Lacolle can be traced back to July 4, 1609, when Samuel de Champlain and his entourage stopped briefly at the mouth of a small stream for a meal before continuing southward up the Richelieu River into the lake which now bears his name. In his journal, Champlain referred to the location of the delta as "Lacole". When translated literally, the term means the neck of a bottle or that which is above the shoulders.

Lacolle was the site of three battles in the early 19th Century. Two of the battles took place during the War of 1812. The Battle of Lacolle Mills (1812) was a short engagement in which a small garrison of Canadien Militia, with the assistance of Kahnawake Mohawk warriors, defended a makeshift log blockhouse from an American invasion force led by Major General Henry Dearborn. In the Battle of Lacolle Mills (1814) a garrison of 80 men of the 13th Regiment of Foot and a Congreve rocket detachment of the Royal Marine Artillery, later reinforced by a company of the Canadian Voltigeurs and the Grenadier company of the Canadian Fencibles successfully defended a blockhouse and stone mill building from an attacking American force of 4,000 men led by Major General James Wilkinson.

The Battle of Lacolle was fought on November 7, 1838, between Loyal Lower Canada volunteer forces under Major John Scriver and Lower Canada rebels under Colonel Ferdinand-Alphonse Oklowski. The half hour battle ended in a rebel defeat.

Roxham Road is located in Lacolle. Between 2017 and 2023, said road would be the main entry point for asylum seekers in Canada seeking to avoid the application of the Safe Third Country Agreement.

== Demographics ==
=== Population ===
Canada census – Lacolle community profile

	2021	2016	2011
Population	2,708 (+4.3% from 2016)	2,596 (-3.1% from 2011)	2,680 (+6.7% from 2006)
Land area	49.41 km^{2} (19.08 sq mi)	49.42 km^{2} (19.08 sq mi)	49.64 km^{2} (19.17 sq mi)
Population density	54.8/km^{2} (142/sq mi)	52.5/km^{2} (136/sq mi)	54.0/km^{2} (140/sq mi)
Median age	45.6 (M: 46.4, F: 44.8)	45.8 (M: 44.9, F: 46.6)	43.2 (M: 42.2, F: 44.2)
Private dwellings	1,278 (total) 1,188 (occupied)	1,189 (total)	1,185 (total)
Median household income	$72,000	$56,704	$44,227

Notes: Amalgamated with Notre-Dame-du-Mont-Carmel on January 1, 2002.
References: 2021 2016 2011

Historical Census Data - Lacolle, Quebec

Year	Pop.	±%
2006	2,512	—
2011	2,680	+6.7%

Year	Pop.	±%
2016	2,596	−3.1%
2021	2,708	+4.3%

Year	Pop.	±%

=== Language ===
Canada Census Mother Tongue - Lacolle, Quebec
Census	Total	French			English			French & English			Other		
Year	Responses	Count	Trend	Pop %	Count	Trend	Pop %	Count	Trend	Pop %	Count	Trend	Pop %
2021	2,710	2,330	▲5.2%	86.0%	235	▼4.1%	8.7%	60	▲20.0%	2.2%	65	▼7.1%	2.4%
2016	2,595	2,215	▼2.6%	85.4%	245	▼21.0%	9.4%	50	▲25.0%	1.9%	70	▲27.3%	2.7%
2011	2,680	2,275	▲5.3%	84.9%	310	▲21.6%	11.6%	40	▲166.7%	1.5%	55	▼26.7%	2.1%
2006	2,505	2,160	n/a	86.2%	255	n/a	10.2%	15	n/a	0.6%	75	n/a	3.0%

== Economy ==
Lacolle as a small industrial park featuring Arneg Inc, Soudure HMC inc, and a Recycling complex operated by Compo Haut-Richelieu inc. (headquartered in St-Jean-sur-Richelieu).

== Education ==
The South Shore Protestant Regional School Board previously served the municipality.

== See also ==
- Battle of Lacolle Mills (1812)
- Battle of Lacolle Mills (1814)
- Battle of Lacolle (1838)
- Lacolle Mills Blockhouse
- Lacolle railway station
- List of anglophone communities in Quebec
- List of municipalities in Quebec
- Municipal reorganization in Quebec
- Richelieu River
