= Catherine Cooksey (chemist) =

American chemist

- Education: University of Kansas (BS); University of Washington (PhD)
- Scientific career
- Fields: Chemistry; Metrology
- Workplaces: National Institute of Standards and Technology
- Thesis: Femtosecond pump-probe studies of chlorine dioxide, dichlorine monoxide, and nitrosyl chloride in solution (2006)
- Doctoral advisor: Phil Reid

Catherine Cooksey is an American chemist at the National Institute of Standards and Technology (NIST) in the Sensor Science Division of the Physical Measurement Laboratory. She is responsible for realizing and maintaining NIST's national scale for spectral transmittance at ultraviolet, visible, and near-infrared wavelengths. Cooksey is a leading expert in spectrophotometry and low uncertainty methods of measuring spectral reflectance and transmittance.

== Education ==
Cooksey earned her B.S. degree in chemistry at University of Kansas, Lawrence. In 2006, she completed a Ph.D. in chemistry at University of Washington, Seattle. Her dissertation was titled Femtosecond pump-probe studies of chlorine dioxide, dichlorine monoxide, and nitrosyl chloride in solution.

== Career ==
Cooksey joined the National Institute of Standards and Technology in 2007. Cooksey is best known for her research on the spectral reflectance of human skin, which has been featured in numerous news outlets. The work earned her a NIST Bronze Medal Award in 2018. Cooksey also helped lead the Digital NIST Pilot Project in 2022.

== Awards ==
Cooksey is the recipient of several awards including the NIST Bronze Medal Award (2018) for her work in creating a database of human skin reflectance values and the Judson C. French Award (2018) for her contributions to the development of the United States national reference instrument for reflectance: Robotic Optical Scattering Instrument (ROSI).
