= Coley (surname) =

Coley is a surname. Notable people with the surname include:

- Alexia Coley, English singer-songwriter
- Andre Coley (born 1974), Jamaican cricketer
- Andy Coley (born 1978), British rugby league player
- Craig Coley (born 1947), American wrongfully convicted of murder
- Doris Coley (1941–2000), American singer with The Shirelles
- Henry Coley (1633–1704), English astrologer
- John Ford Coley (born 1948), American singer and musician
- Stacy Coley (born 1994), American football player
- Trevon Coley (born 1994), American football player
- William Coley (1862–1936), American surgeon and cancer researcher

== See also ==
- Coley (disambiguation)
- Colley (disambiguation)
