= Battle of Lacolle (1838) =

Battle of the Lower Canada Rebellion

Coordinates: 45°05′N 73°22′W

- Part of the Lower Canada Rebellion
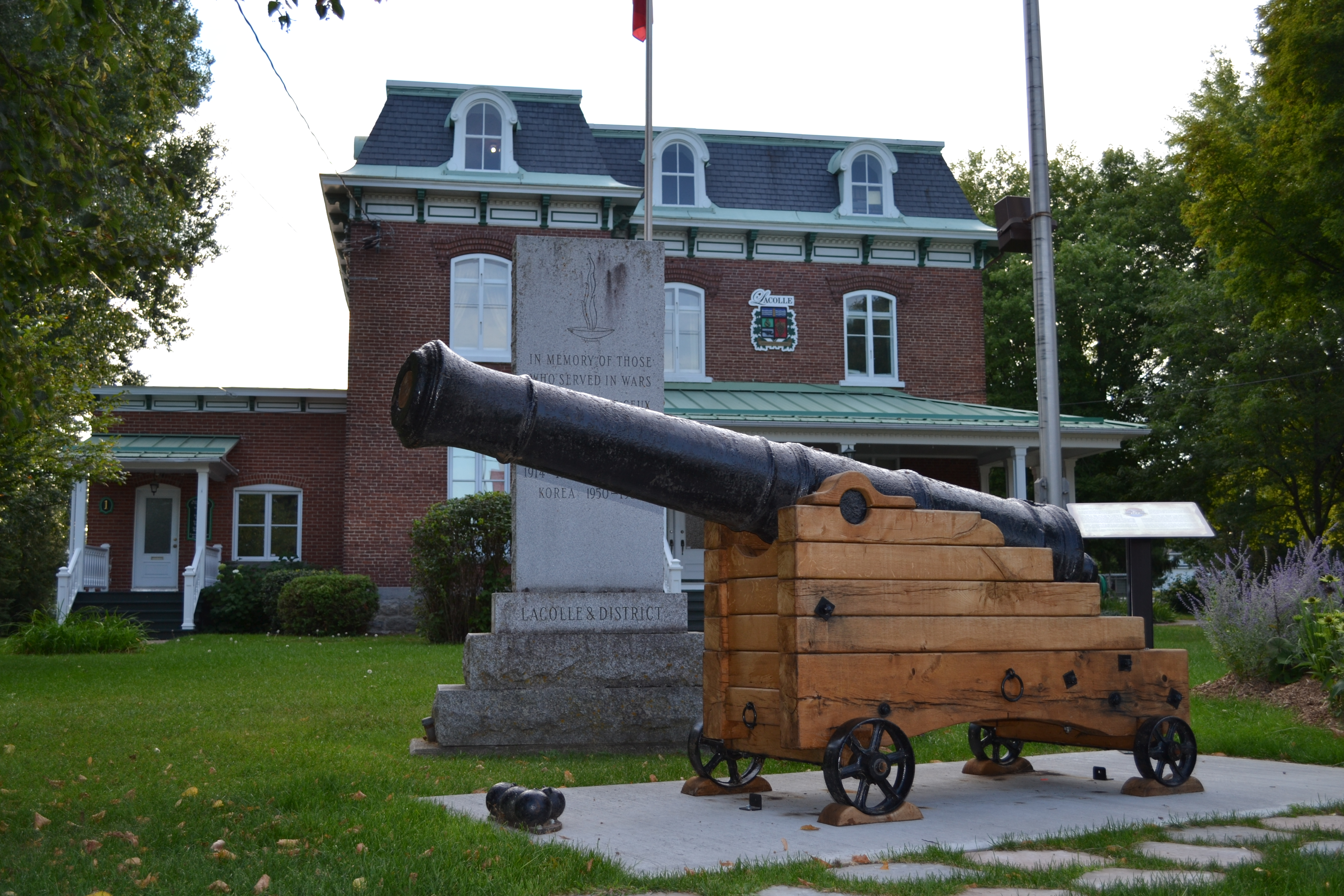
- Present day Lacolle
Date	November 7, 1838
Location	Lacolle, Quebec
Result	Loyalist victory

Belligerents
(United Kingdom) Lower Canada	Patriotes

Commanders and leaders
John Scriver	Ferdinand-Alphonse Oklowski

Strength
400 Loyalists	170 Patriotes

Casualties and losses
2 dead	8 dead

The Battle of Lacolle was fought on November 7, 1838, between Loyal Lower Canada volunteer forces under Major John Scriver and Patriote rebels under Colonel Ferdinand-Alphonse Oklowski. On November 6, on their way to Lacolle, the Patriote rebels had won a first skirmish, but they lost in the final confrontation the next day. The battle lasted half an hour.
