= Battle of Lacolle Mills (1814) =

Battle on 30 March 1814 during the War of 1812

Coordinates: 45.0676°N 73.3438°W

- Part of the War of 1812
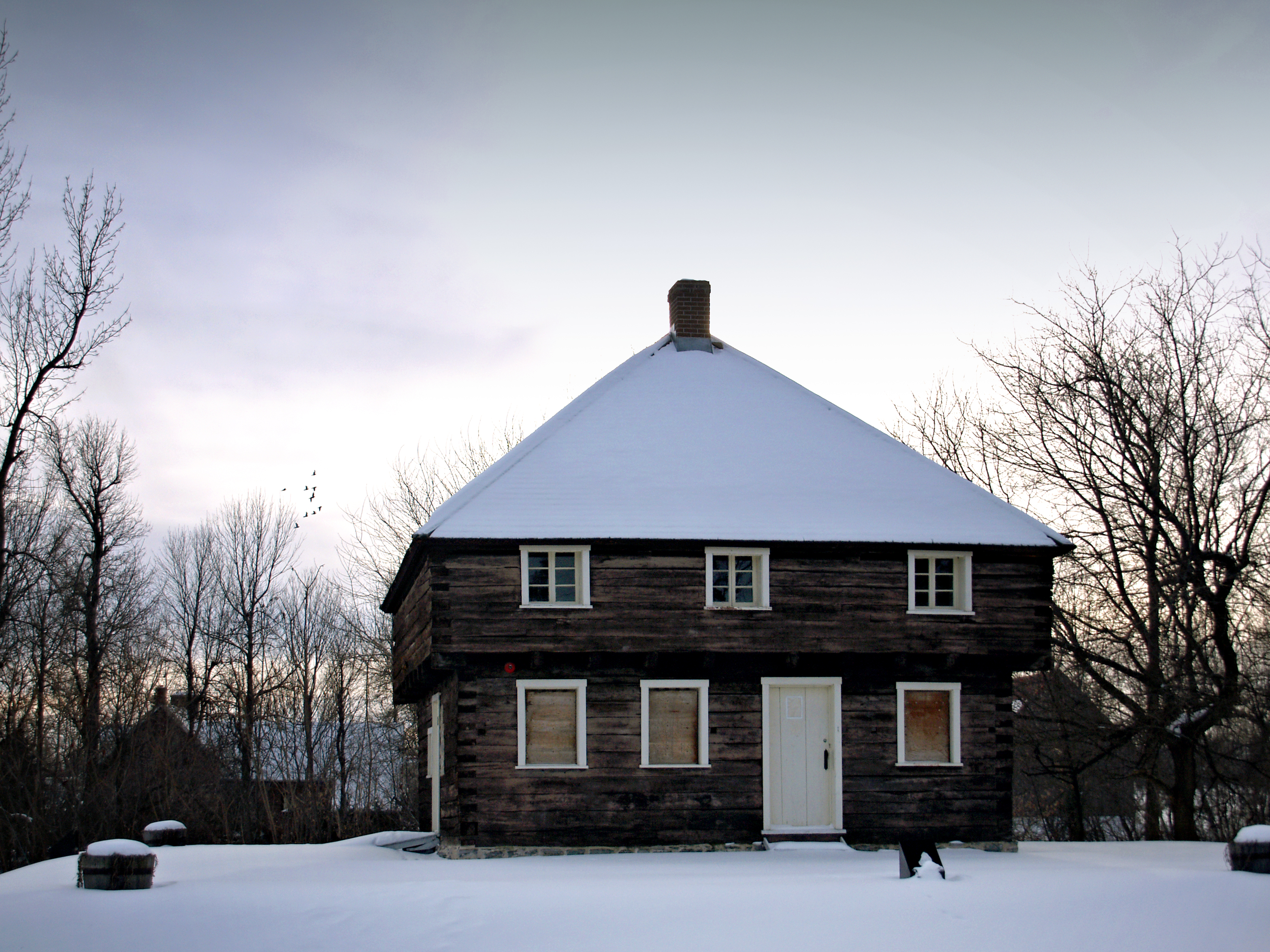
- Lacolle Mills Blockhouse
Date	March 30, 1814
Location	Lacolle, Quebec, Lower Canada
Result	British victory

Belligerents
United Kingdom; Lower Canada	United States

Commanders and leaders
Richard Handcock	James Wilkinson

Strength
Start of battle: 80; End of battle: over 500; Detachment of Congreve rockets	4,000

Casualties and losses
11 killed 46 wounded 4 missing Total: 61	13 killed 51–128 wounded 13 missing Total: 77–154

The Battle of Lacolle Mills was fought on 30 March 1814 during the War of 1812. The small garrison of a British outpost position, aided by Canadian reinforcements, fought off a large American attack.

Despite being outnumbered 12-1, the British pulled off the victory, due to their well-trained and high morale men defeating a non-experienced American group.

== Background ==
After the St. Lawrence campaign had ended late the previous year with the British victory at the Battle of Crysler's Farm, the defeated American Army under Major General James Wilkinson went into winter quarters at French Mills, New York, only just inside the United States. The British commanders feared that the Americans could threaten the British line of communication along the St. Lawrence River from this position, but Wilkinson made no attempt to do so. His army arrived at French Mills with few supplies, and because of poor roads, lack of transport and draught animals and inefficiency of the Quartermaster General's Department, it was almost impossible to supply the army in this advanced position. Sickness rapidly increased until there were no less than 450 sick in squalid conditions in a hospital in Malone, New York and many more in French Mills.

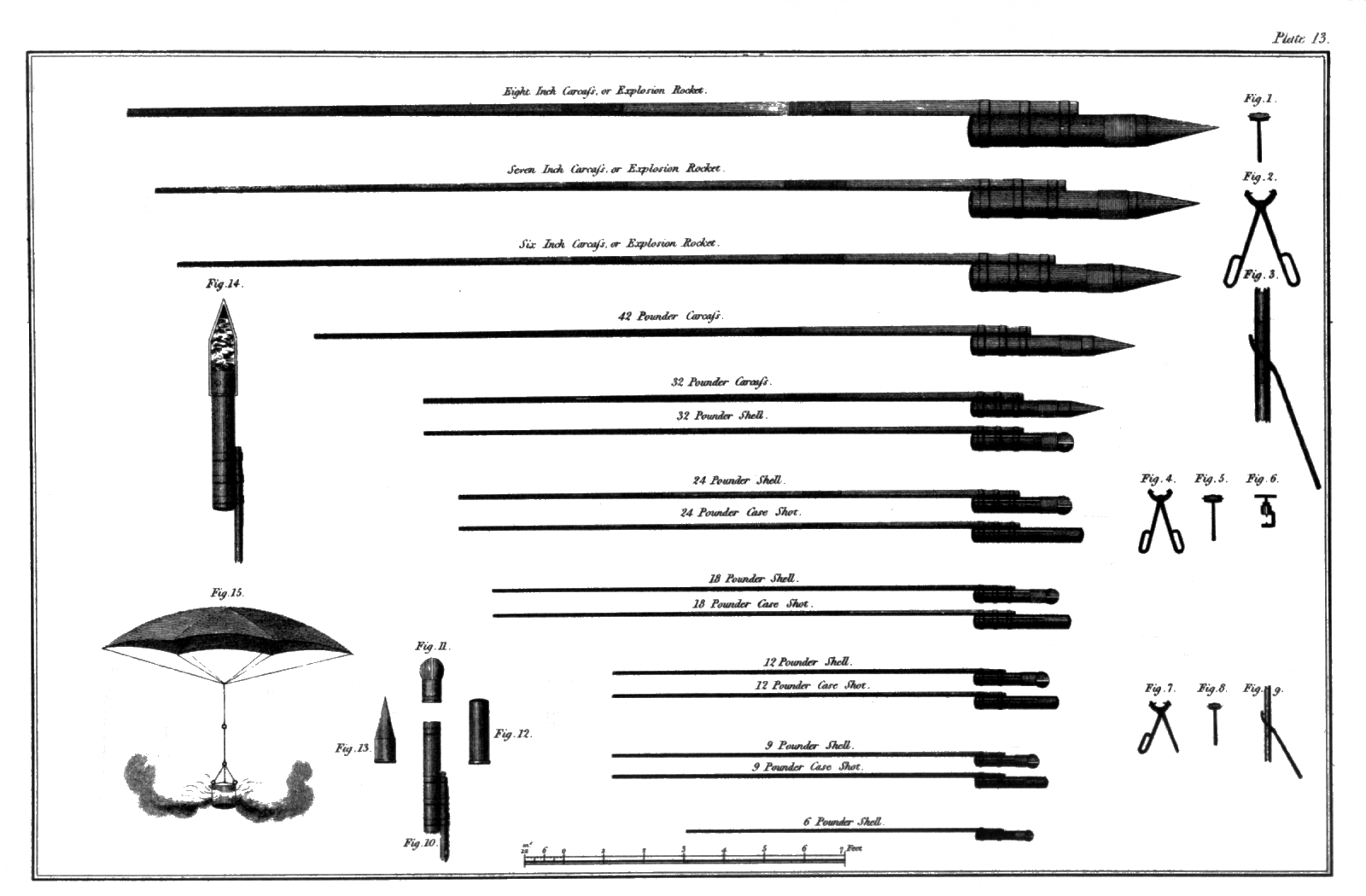
Schematics for Congreve rockets. The British defenders at Lacolle Mills included a Congreve rocket detachment from the Royal Marines.

Finally, in late January, Secretary of War John Armstrong ordered Wilkinson to detach a division numbering 2,000 men under Brigadier General Jacob Brown to Sackett's Harbor, New York, and fall back with the main body (about 4,000 fit men) to Plattsburgh, New York on Lake Champlain, while the sick and wounded were removed to Burlington, Vermont. British troops followed up almost to Plattsburgh, recovering large quantities of supplies from settlements in New York state such as Malone and Four Corners and paroling many sick American soldiers who fell into their hands, before withdrawing.

Wilkinson was aware that he would almost certainly be removed from command following the defeat of the St. Lawrence campaign, and planned several offensives to restore his reputation. Most of these were too ambitious with the means available, but one objective seemed feasible. A few miles north of the border between Canada and the United States, the main road running north crossed the small Lacolle River. Here, the British maintained an outpost of 80 men of the 13th Regiment of Foot in the Lacolle Mills Blockhouse and the stout stone-built watermill. The defenders also included a Congreve rocket detachment of the Royal Marine Artillery, and there were other outpost positions and blockhouses nearby. American forces, under Major-General Henry Dearborn, had tried to capture the same post back in the fall of 1812. However, that attack had floundered in the face of poor organization and inexperience.

== Battle ==
Wilkinson marched northwards from Plattsburgh to attack this outpost on 27 March 1814. His force consisted of 4,000 men organised into three brigades, with 11 pieces of artillery. The march was delayed by deep snow and mud, and he was not able to occupy Odelltown until 30 March, and begin the attack on Lacolle Mill until the early afternoon.

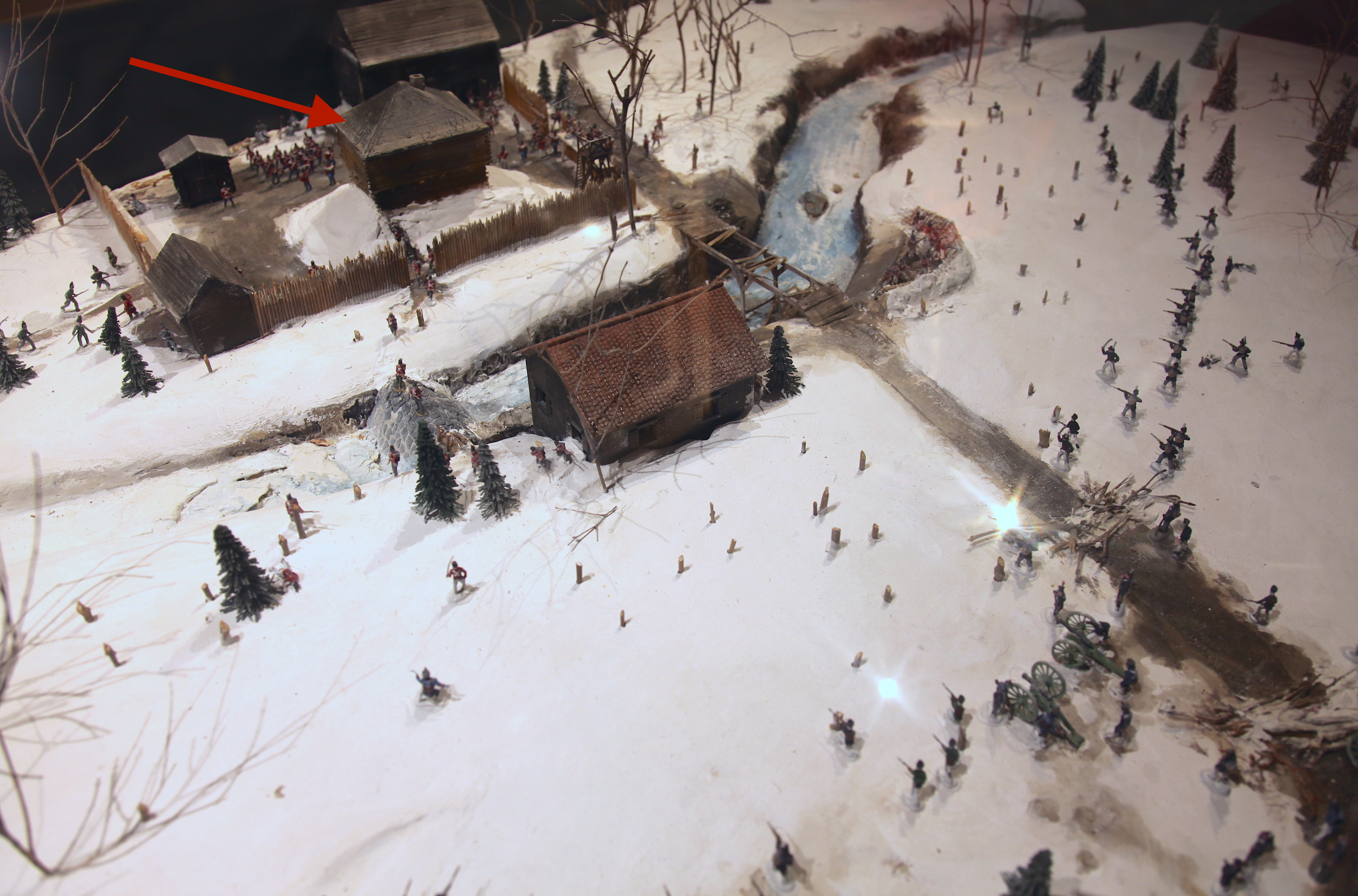
Diorama of the battle

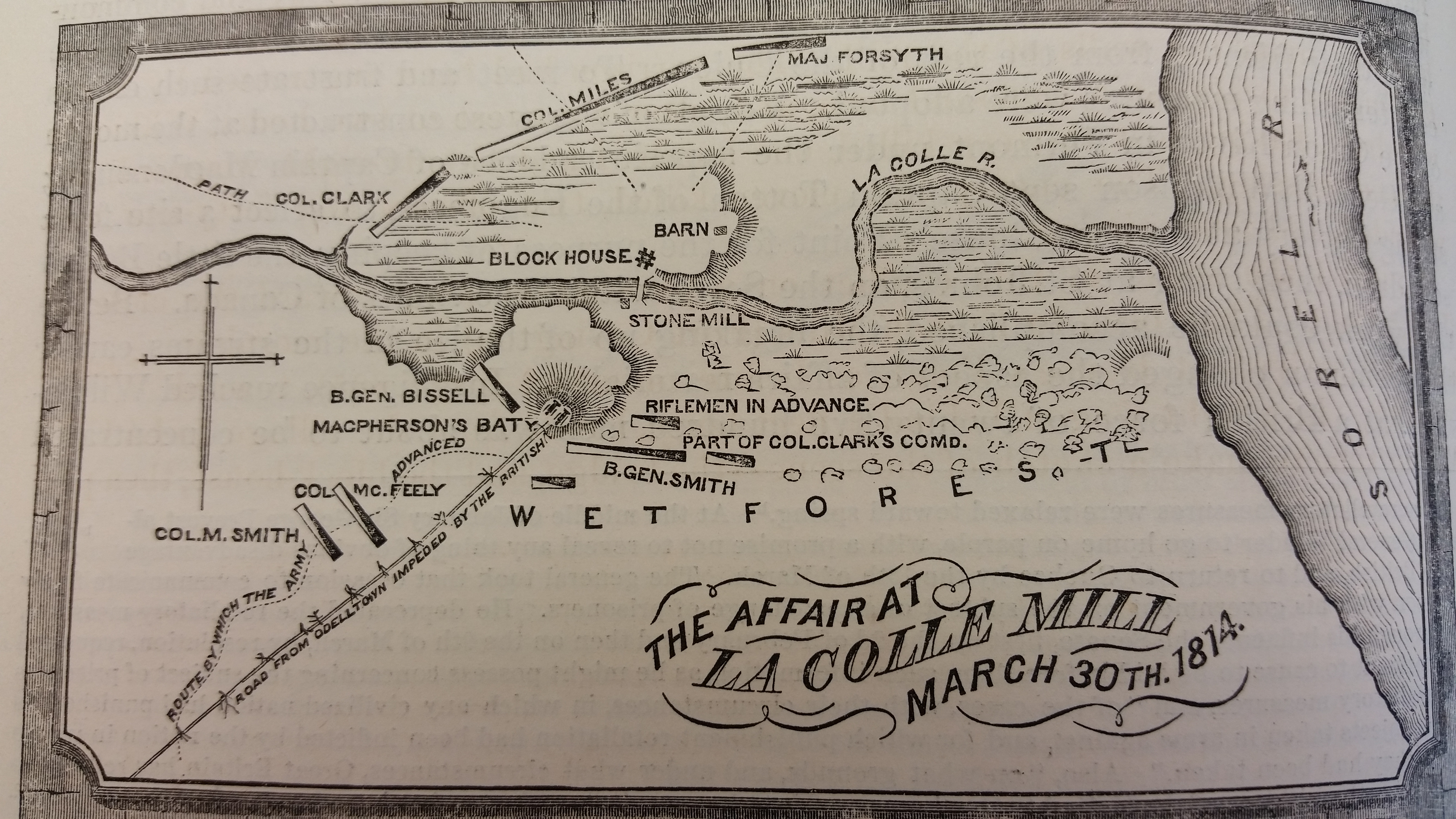
Map of the Battle of Lacolle Mill

The Americans opened fire with two 12-pounder cannon and a 5.5 inch mortar. They could not bring an 18-pounder gun into action because of soft ground around the area. The British garrison fired back with their Congreve rockets. Although the rockets were inaccurate, they caused several American casualties. The American troops had not encountered these weapons before in battle and were unnerved.

The flank (i.e. the Light and Grenadier) companies of the 13th had been stationed nearby. They launched a bayonet charge against the American artillery emplacements, but only 80 in number, they were far outnumbered and were repulsed. Hearing the firing from some 3 kilometres (1.9 mi) away, a company of 400 Canadian Voltigeurs and the Grenadier company of the Canadian Regiment of Fencible Infantry also marched to reinforce the defenders. They waded through icy water to slip through the American lines and opened fire on American artillery, wounding the American artillery commander, his replacement and many of the gun crews. The Americans were also under fire from British gunboats under Commander Daniel Pring of the Royal Navy, who had brought his vessels up the Richelieu River from Ile aux Noix to the mouth of the Lacolle River.

By evening, the Americans had made little impression on the British defences. Rather than launch an all-out assault, Wilkinson ordered a retreat. The Americans returned to Plattsburgh, considerably disheartened. Wilkinson had recklessly exposed himself to British fire throughout the action, though to little purpose.

== Aftermath ==
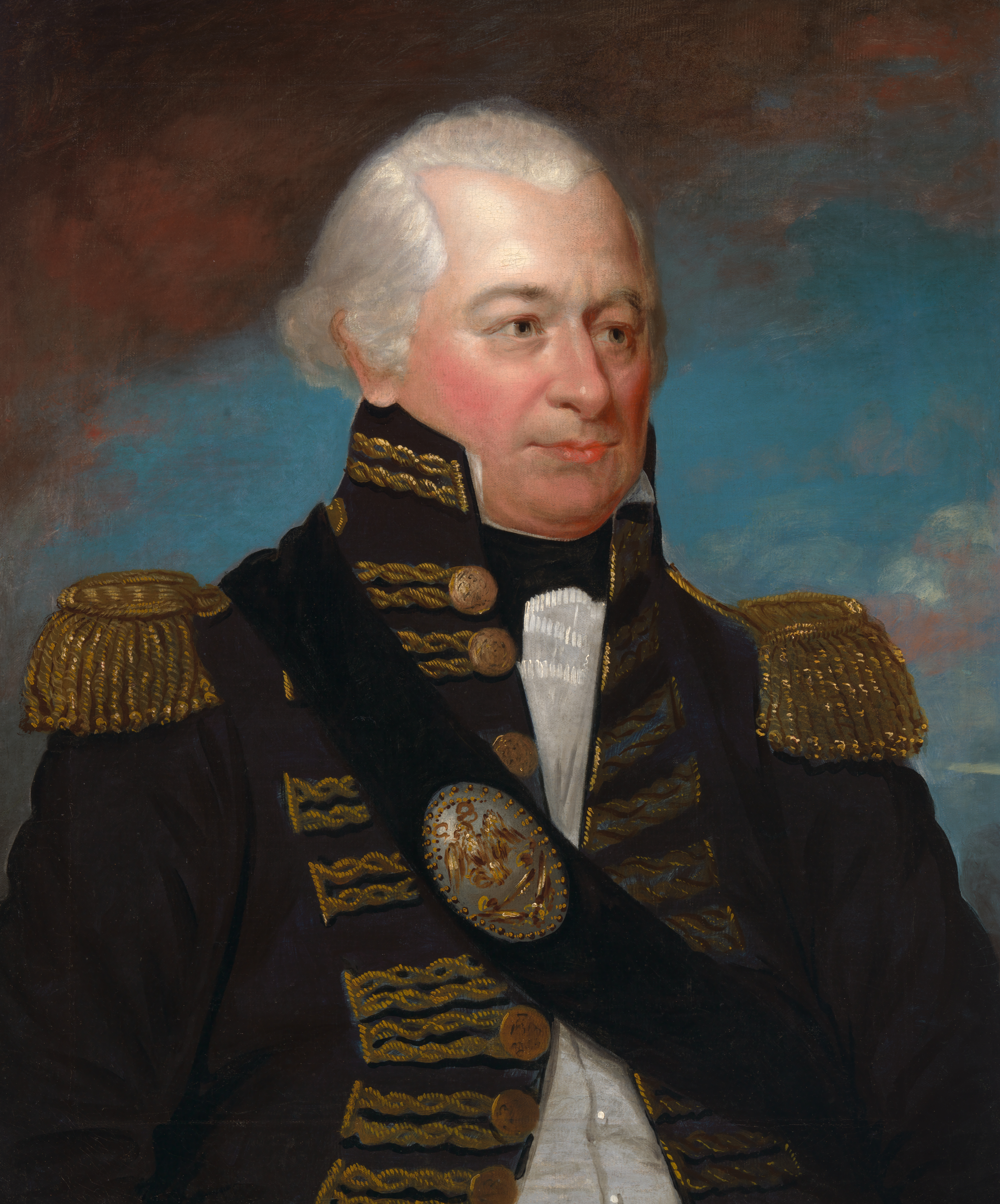
American Maj Gen James Wilkinson, was relieved of his command shortly after the battle. His conduct during the St. Lawrence campaign was later questioned in a U.S. Army Court of Enquiry.

On 11 April, Wilkinson received orders from Armstrong relieving him of command. This was probably not a direct result of the debacle at Lacolle Mills, but followed a request made by Wilkinson himself on 24 March for a Court of Enquiry to rule on his conduct of the St. Lawrence campaign the previous year. This eventually resulted in a court martial, but Wilkinson was acquitted of various charges of negligence and misconduct.

The failure nevertheless allowed Armstrong to promote a crop of comparatively junior officers to command divisions and brigades. Major General George Izard, who had been on leave when the Battle of Lacolle Mills was fought, eventually took command at Plattsburgh.

== Legacy ==
Thirteen active regular infantry battalions of the United States Army (1-2 Inf, 2-2 Inf, 1-3 Inf, 2-3 Inf, 4-3 Inf, 1-4 Inf, 2-4 Inf, 3-4 Inf, 1-5 Inf, 2-5 Inf, 1-6 Inf, 2-6 Inf and 4-6 Inf) perpetuate the lineages of a number of American units (the old 5th, 6th, 11th, 13th, 14th and 20th Infantry Regiments) that were present at the battle.

The 13th Regiment of Foot is perpetuated in the British Army by the Rifles Regiment. Within the Canadian Army, the Canadian Regiment of Fencible Infantry is commemorated by the Royal 22e Regiment. while the Canadian Voltigeurs are perpetuated by Les Voltigeurs de Quebec. While a specific battle honour was not awarded for the Battle of Lacolle Mills, both of the Canadian Regiments carry the theater honour "Defence of Canada, 1812-1815", awarded to Canadian Fencible and militia units for participation in successful engagements during the War of 1812, including this battle.

The site of the battle was designated a National Historic Site of Canada in 1923.

== See also ==
- Battle of Lacolle Mills (1812)
- John L. Gardner (brigadier general) Present at Battle of Lacolle Mills (not as Brig.General)
