= List of historic places in Montérégie =

This article is a list of historic places in Montérégie, entered on the Canadian Register of Historic Places, whether they are federal, provincial, or municipal. All addresses are the administrative Region 16. For all other listings in the province of Quebec, see List of historic places in Quebec.

Name	Address	Coordinates	Government recognition (CRHP №)	Wikidata ID	Image
Battle of the Chateauguay National Historic Site of Canada	2371 Riviere-Chateauguay-Nord; Allans Corners QC	45°09′30″N 73°55′44″W	Federal (3271)		More images
Bus Terminal and Office Building	Saint-Bernard-de-Lacolle QC	45°00′38″N 73°27′09″W	Federal (4787)		Upload Photo
Customs Immigration Building	Godmanchester QC	44°59′38″N 74°18′42″W	Federal (4789)		More images
Couvent des Soeurs de la Présentation de Marie	1395, Rue Notre-Dame; Saint-Césaire QC	45°24′31″N 73°00′06″W	Quebec (16212)		
Noyau institutionnel de Knowlton	Chemin Lakeside; Lac-Brome QC	45°13′11″N 72°30′31″W	Quebec (15062)		
Pont Turcot	Route 203; Très-Saint-Sacrament QC	45°11′54″N 73°51′49″W	Quebec (14081)		
Pont Turcot	Montée Turcot, across the Chateauguay River; Tres-Saint-Sacrament QC	45°11′54″N 73°51′49″W	Quebec (13058)		
Maison François-Xavier-Paquette-Dit-Lavallée	289, Chemin de la Beauce; Calixa-Lavallée QC	45°45′51″N 73°15′52″W	Quebec (5277)		More images
Maison Lenoblet-Du Plessis	4752, Boulevard Marie-Victorin; Contrecœur QC	45°51′17″N 73°14′32″W	Quebec (5593)		More images
Calvaire du Cordon	505, Rang Sainte-Therese; Saint-Rémi QC	45°16′50″N 73°38′23″W	Quebec (6928)		
Saint-Ours Canal National Historic Site of Canada	2930 Patriot Road; Saint-Ours QC	45°51′53″N 73°08′47″W	Federal (7841)		More images
Moulin à vent de Contrecoeur	6098, Route Marie-Victorin; Contrecœur QC	45°52′07″N 73°13′32″W	Quebec (8347)		More images
Ancien hôtel de ville de Rigaud	102, Rue Saint-Pierre; Rigaud QC	45°28′34″N 74°18′18″W	Quebec (8116)		More images
Coteau-du-Lac National Historic Site of Canada	308a River Road; Coteau-du-Lac QC	45°17′16″N 74°10′36″W	Federal (11675)		More images
Pont couvert de Powerscourt	Chemin de la 1re Concession; Hinchinbrooke QC	45°00′26″N 74°09′38″W	Federal (12723), Quebec (5285)		More images
Bureau d'enregistrement de Huntingdon	25, Rue King; Huntingdon QC	45°05′14″N 74°10′32″W	Quebec (6979)		More images
Maison Pierre-Rousselle	160, Rue Saint-Joseph; Sainte-Martine QC	45°14′49″N 73°48′12″W	Quebec (7027)		More images
Édifice de comté de Huntingdon	23, Rue King; Huntingdon QC	45°05′15″N 74°10′31″W	Quebec (7038)		More images
Site archéologique Droulers-Tsiionhiakwatha	1800, Chemin Leahy; Saint-Anicet QC	45°04′59″N 74°18′54″W	Quebec (7115)		More images
Site historique de l'Entrée-Inférieure-de-l'Ancien-Canal-de-Beauharnois	Rue Bourcier; Beauharnois QC	45°19′08″N 73°55′38″W	Quebec (9119)		
Site archéologique de la Pointe-du-Buisson	333, Rue Emond; Beauharnois QC	45°18′55″N 73°58′00″W	Quebec (11296)		
Droulers-Tsiionhiakwatha National Historic Site of Canada	1800 Leahy Road; Saint-Anicet QC	45°04′55″N 74°18′50″W	Federal (12106)		
Havelock Township Hall National Historic Site of Canada	481 Highway 203; Havelock QC	45°02′45″N 73°45′28″W	Federal (12998)		More images
Pointe-du-Buisson National Historic Site of Canada	333 Emond Street; Melocheville QC	45°18′55″N 73°57′55″W	Federal (13056)		More images
Maison Sauvageau-Sweeny	422, Boulevard Salaberry; Mercier QC	45°20′12″N 73°45′28″W	Quebec (5152)		More images
Église Saint-Luke	Rue de la Cour; Waterloo QC	45°20′42″N 72°30′53″W	Quebec (8745)		More images
Ensemble religieux de Saint-Paul-d'Abbotsford	Rang de la Montagne; Saint-Paul-d'Abbotsford QC	45°26′33″N 72°53′26″W	Quebec (8891)		More images
Église universaliste de Waterloo	441, Rue de la Cour; Waterloo QC	45°20′44″N 72°30′56″W	Quebec (10174)		More images
Maison natale Honoré-Mercier	927, Rue 133; Sainte-Anne-de-Sabrevois QC	45°13′07″N 73°13′45″W	Quebec (4839)		More images
Noyau institutionnel de Saint-Pierre-de-Véronne	Route 202; Saint-Pierre-de-Veronne-a-Pike-River QC	45°07′21″N 73°04′07″W	Quebec (6540)		More images
Maison du Domaine-Lakefield	501, Petit Rang; Saint-Valentin QC	45°10′40″N 73°20′09″W	Quebec (6911)		More images
Fort Lennox National Historic Site of Canada	1 61st Avenue; Saint-Paul-de-l'Île-aux-Noix QC	45°07′26″N 73°15′59″W	Federal (12608)		More images
Fort Richelieu National Historic Site of Canada	Place Charles-de-Montmagny; Sorel QC	46°02′49″N 73°06′56″W	Federal (20105)		
North Front Casemate	Île aux Noix QC	45°07′26″N 73°15′54″W	Federal (3657)		Upload Photo
Officers' Quarters	Saint-Paul-de-l'Île-aux-Noix QC	45°07′17″N 73°16′04″W	Federal (3659)		More images
Guardhouse	Ile-aux-Noix QC	45°07′17″N 73°16′03″W	Federal (11259)		
Fort Lennox, West Front casemates	Île aux Noix QC	45°07′26″N 73°15′54″W	Federal (3660)		Upload Photo
South Magazine	Saint-Paul-de-l'Ile-aux-Noix QC	45°07′26″N 73°15′54″W	Federal (11007)		Upload Photo
North Magazine	Saint-Paul-de-l'Ile-aux-Noix QC	45°07′12″N 73°16′01″W	Federal (11012)		
Barracks	Ile-aux-Noix QC	45°07′16″N 73°16′07″W	Federal (11258)		
Powder Magazine	Fort Lennox; Saint-Paul-de-l'Île-aux-Noix QC	45°07′19″N 73°16′05″W	Federal (15820)		
Woodworking Shop	Chambly QC	45°26′45″N 73°16′43″W	Federal (10657)		Upload Photo
Lockstation Cabin 8	Chambly QC	45°26′17″N 73°15′25″W	Federal (11077)		
Lockstation Cabin 7	Chambly QC	45°26′24″N 73°15′47″W	Federal (11087)		
Cabin 1	Chambly QC	45°26′52″N 73°16′59″W	Federal (11271)		Upload Photo
Cabin 3	Chambly QC	45°26′52″N 73°16′59″W	Federal (11298)		
Cabin at Bridge 5	Chambly QC	45°25′20″N 73°14′57″W	Federal (11350)		Upload Photo
Cabin at Bridge 2	Chambly QC	45°26′25″N 73°15′47″W	Federal (11351)		
Superintendent's Residence	1745 Bourgogne Avenue; Chambly QC	45°26′52″N 73°17′01″W	Federal (11393)		
Aqueduc de la Rivière-Saint-Pierre	Salaberry-de-Valleyfield QC	45°17′43″N 73°59′14″W	Quebec (9114)		
Site historique de l'Entrée-Supérieure-de-l'Ancien-Canal-de-Beauharnois	Rue Victoria; Salaberry-de-Valleyfield QC	45°15′23″N 74°08′12″W	Quebec (9125)		More images
Arrondissement institutionnel de la paroisse de Sainte-Cécile	Salaberry-de-Valleyfield QC	45°15′19″N 74°08′08″W	Quebec (11459)		
Moulin à vent Dansereau	1025, Route Marie-Victorin; Verchères QC	45°47′32″N 73°19′52″W	Quebec (9113)		More images
Moulin à vent de Verchères	Rue Madeleine; Verchères QC	45°46′41″N 73°21′24″W	Quebec (10529)		
Madeleine de Verchères National Historic Site of Canada	Verchères QC	45°46′40″N 73°21′25″W	Federal (17402)		More images
Fort Laprairie National Historic Site of Canada	La Prairie QC	45°25′16″N 73°29′48″W	Federal (17681)		Upload Photo
Arrondissement historique de La Prairie	La Prairie QC	45°25′15″N 73°29′42″W	Quebec (8109)		More images
Battle of Eccles Hill National Historic Site of Canada	Frelighsburg QC	45°01′10″N 72°54′17″W	Federal (15783)		More images
Site archéologique Mandeville	13500, Chemin Saint-Roch; Sorel-Tracy QC	45°59′15″N 73°08′51″W	Quebec (15231)		
Fort St-Louis National Historic Site of Canada	Kahnawake QC	45°24′56″N 73°40′38″W	Federal (13717)		
Caughnawaga Mission / Mission of St. Francis Xavier National Historic Site of Canada	River Front Road; Kahnawake QC	45°14′33″N 73°24′39″W	Federal (15069)		
Caughnawaga Presbytery National Historic Site of Canada	Chateauguay Highway; Kahnawake QC	45°24′34″N 73°40′53″W	Federal (15228)		
Battle of the Cedars National Historic Site of Canada	River Road; Les Cèdres QC	45°18′36″N 74°02′08″W	Federal (19640)		Upload Photo
Maison Pierre-Charray	1037, Chemin du Fleuve; Les Cèdres QC	45°18′16″N 74°03′14″W	Quebec (7026)		
Ancienne centrale hydroélectrique des Cèdres	2100, Chemin du Fleuve; Les Cèdres QC	45°18′33″N 74°08′00″W	Quebec (7155)		
Maison Félix-Leclerc	186, Chemin de l'Anse; Vaudreuil-Dorion QC	45°25′15″N 74°03′17″W	Quebec (14264), Vaudreuil-Dorion municipality (5049)		
Site du patrimoine de la Maison-Félix-Leclerc	186, Chemin de l'Anse; Vaudreuil-Dorion QC	45°25′15″N 74°03′17″W	Quebec (7108)		
Site du patrimoine de la Maison-du-Chanoine-Lionel-Groulx	150, Chemin des Chenaux; Vaudreuil-Dorion QC	45°24′25″N 74°01′10″W	Quebec (7896)		
Maison Trestler	85, Chemin de la Commune; Vaudreuil-Dorion QC	45°23′18″N 74°00′27″W	Federal (12772), Quebec (8452)		More images
Collège Saint-Michel	431, Avenue Saint-Charles; Vaudreuil-Dorion QC	45°24′00″N 74°01′37″W	Quebec (9363)		More images
Maison du Meunier-de-Pointe-du-Moulin	2500, Boulevard Don-Quichotte; Notre-Dame-de-l'Île-Perrot QC	45°21′58″N 73°51′12″W	Quebec (6862)		More images
Moulin à vent de Pointe-du-Moulin	2500, Boulevard Don-Quichotte; Notre-Dame-de-l'Île-Perrot QC	45°21′58″N 73°51′08″W	Quebec (6872)		More images
Église de Sainte-Jeanne-de-Chantal	Rue de l'Eglise; Notre-Dame-de-l'Île-Perrot QC	45°20′58″N 73°54′06″W	Quebec (10277)		
Église de Saint-Michel	Avenue Saint-Charles; Vaudreuil-Dorion QC	45°23′56″N 74°01′36″W	Quebec (10761)		More images
Ancien palais de justice de Vaudreuil	420, Avenue Saint-Charles; Vaudreuil-Dorion QC	45°23′57″N 74°01′38″W	Quebec (11152)		More images
Maison Joachim-Génus	331, Avenue Saint-Charles; Vaudreuil-Dorion QC	45°23′29″N 74°01′02″W	Quebec (12953)		
Round Stone Windmill and House National Historic Site of Canada	2500 Don-Quichotte Boulevard; Notre-Dame-de-l'Île-Perrot QC	45°21′57″N 73°51′08″W	Federal (14506)		
Palais de justice de Napierville	361, Rue Saint-Jacques; Napierville QC	45°11′17″N 73°24′21″W	Quebec (5289)		More images
Ancienne gare de Napierville Junction	21, Rue Sainte-Marie; Lacolle QC	45°04′54″N 73°22′08″W	Federal (4530), Quebec (8953)		
Site historique de l'Église-d'Odelltown	Route 221; Lacolle QC	45°02′33″N 73°23′13″W	Quebec (9115)		More images
1, rue de l'Église Sud	1, Rue de l'Eglise Sud; Lacolle QC	45°04′51″N 73°22′23″W	Quebec (9796)		More images
48, rue Van Vliet	48, Rue Van Vliet; Lacolle QC	45°04′52″N 73°22′11″W	Quebec (9798)		More images
Cimetière Douglass	Montee Douglass; Saint-Cyprien-de-Napierville QC	45°11′43″N 73°26′46″W	Quebec (10257)		More images
Maison Nathaniel-Douglass	750, Montee Douglass; Saint-Cyprien-de-Napierville QC	45°11′44″N 73°26′54″W	Quebec (10303)		
Ancienne église anglicane Saint-Saviour	7, Rue de l'Eglise Nord; Lacolle QC	45°04′55″N 73°22′24″W	Quebec (10337)		More images
Chapelle-reposoir de Saint-Jacques-le-Mineur	Rue Principale; Saint-Jacques-le-Mineur QC	45°16′44″N 73°24′56″W	Quebec (7174)		More images
Grange Alexander-Solomon-Walbridge	189, Chemin de Mystic; Saint-Ignace-de-Stanbridge QC	45°09′10″N 72°59′15″W	Quebec (8212)		More images
Église Saint-George	Rue Front Nord; Clarenceville QC	45°03′51″N 73°14′49″W	Quebec (11983)		More images
Blockhaus de la Rivière-Lacolle	Route 223; Saint-Paul-de-l'Île-aux-Noix QC	45°04′09″N 73°20′31″W	Quebec (6386)		
Moulin Freligh	12, Route 237 Nord; Frelighsburg QC	45°03′19″N 72°50′23″W	Quebec (6610)		More images
Maison Joseph-Courchesne	200, Rang Grande-Terre; Saint-François-du-Lac QC	46°04′41″N 72°51′43″W	Quebec (5489)		
Domaine seigneurial de Saint-Ours	2500, Rue de l'Immaculee-Conception; Saint-Ours QC	45°53′25″N 73°09′01″W	Quebec (6929)		
Presbytère de Saint-François-du-Lac	440, Rue Notre-Dame; Saint-François-du-Lac QC	46°03′58″N 72°49′33″W	Quebec (8153)		
Église de Saint-François-du-Lac	Rue Notre-Dame; Saint-François-du-Lac QC	46°03′59″N 72°49′36″W	Quebec (10296)		More images
Édifice de la MRC-de-Nicolet-Yamaska	400, Rue Notre-Dame; Saint-François-du-Lac QC	46°04′03″N 72°49′43″W	Quebec (10809)		More images
Maison Jean-Baptiste-Mâsse	610, Chemin des Patriotes; Saint-Denis-sur-Richelieu QC	45°47′07″N 73°09′36″W	Quebec (5280)		More images
Maison Amable-Hébert	255, Chemin des Patriotes; Saint-Charles-sur-Richelieu QC	45°39′45″N 73°11′34″W	Quebec (5291)		
Maison François-Cherrier	639, Chemin des Patriotes; Saint-Denis-sur-Richelieu QC	45°47′01″N 73°09′39″W	Quebec (5292)		More images
Acton Vale Railway Station (Grand Trunk) National Historic Site of Canada	960 Boulay Street; Acton Vale QC	45°38′54″N 72°33′50″W	Federal (10708)		More images
Site historique de La Présentation-de-la-Sainte-Vierge	Rue de l'Eglise; La Présentation QC	45°39′55″N 73°03′06″W	Quebec (10805)		
Presbytère de Saint-Valérien-de-Milton	1373, Rue Principale; Saint-Valérien-de-Milton QC	45°33′55″N 72°42′36″W	Quebec (10998)		
Église de La Présentation-de-la-Sainte-Vierge	Rue de l'Eglise; La Présentation QC	45°39′55″N 73°03′06″W	Quebec (12435)		
Cloche Marguerite-Michel	636, Chemin des Patriotes; Saint-Denis-sur-Richelieu QC	45°47′00″N 73°09′36″W	Quebec (13483)		Upload Photo
Troisième École de Côte-Plaisance	268, Chemin des Patriotes; Saint-Denis-sur-Richelieu QC	45°48′40″N 73°08′49″W	Quebec (14643)		
Royal Military College Saint-Jean, Officer Cadet Dormitory	Jacques Cartier Street; Saint-Jean-sur-Richelieu QC	45°17′59″N 73°17′01″W	Federal (4498)		
Administration Building No. 24	Saint-Jean-sur-Richelieu QC	45°17′59″N 73°17′01″W	Federal (4768)		More images
Former Museum, Former Guard House, Building 26 (1885)	Saint-Jean-sur-Richelieu QC	45°17′59″N 73°17′01″W	Federal (4769)		More images
Royal Military College Saint-Jean, Officer's Mess	Saint-Jean-sur-Richelieu QC	45°17′59″N 73°15′04″W	Federal (10154)		More images
de Salaberry House National Historic Site of Canada	18 Richelieu Street; Chambly QC	45°26′46″N 73°15′50″W	Federal (15708)		
Ensemble institutionnel de Saint-Romuald	Rue Yamaska Est; Farnham QC	45°17′12″N 72°58′25″W	Quebec (15123)		More images
Résidence George-Knight-Nesbitt	215, Rue du Sud; Cowansville QC	45°12′21″N 72°44′45″W	Quebec (9475)		More images
Saint-Hyacinthe Post Office National Historic Site of Canada	1905 Girouard Street West; Saint-Hyacinthe QC	45°37′26″N 72°56′55″W	Federal (12603)		More images
Four à pain Dupuis	265, Rue Jean-Talon; Saint-Jean-sur-Richelieu QC	45°21′42″N 73°16′03″W	Quebec (6602)		More images
Site archéologique des Casernes-de-Blairfindie	Saint-Jean-sur-Richelieu QC	45°23′00″N 73°22′09″W	Quebec (13274)		
Manoir William-Plenderleath-Christie	375, 1iere Rue; Saint-Jean-sur-Richelieu QC	45°18′41″N 73°14′45″W	Quebec (5486)		Upload Photo
Site du patrimoine de Saint-Jean-sur-Richelieu	Saint-Jean-sur-Richelieu QC	45°18′45″N 73°14′35″W	Quebec (7973)		More images
Maison Roy	2554, Rue Principale; Saint-Blaise-sur-Richelieu QC	45°15′09″N 73°20′53″W	Quebec (6383)		
École de fabrique de Sainte-Marguerite-de-Blairfindie	1464, Chemin du Clocher; Saint-Jean-sur-Richelieu QC	45°18′54″N 73°20′58″W	Quebec (6871)		More images
Ferme Joseph-Roy	777, Chemin des Vieux-Moulins; Saint-Jean-sur-Richelieu QC	45°17′58″N 73°21′26″W	Quebec (7029)		
Presbytère de Sainte-Marguerite-de-Blairfindie	1450, Chemin du Clocher; Saint-Jean-sur-Richelieu QC	45°18′54″N 73°20′57″W	Quebec (9361)		More images
Église de Sainte-Marguerite-de-Blairfindie	Chemin du Clocher; Saint-Jean-sur-Richelieu QC	45°18′54″N 73°20′55″W	Quebec (10551)		
Maison McGinnis	166, Rue Jacques-Cartier Nord; Saint-Jean-sur-Richelieu QC	45°18′18″N 73°15′13″W	Quebec (5491)		More images
Maison Pierre-Roy	850, Chemin Petit-Bernier; Saint-Jean-sur-Richelieu QC	45°15′30″N 73°18′28″W	Quebec (6669)		
Saint-Jean-d'Iberville Railway Station (Grand Trunk) National Historic Site of Canada	31 Frontenac Street; Saint-Jean-sur-Richelieu QC	45°18′10″N 73°15′13″W	Federal (7483)		More images
Fort Saint-Jean National Historic Site of Canada (1748 & 1775–1776)	Saint-Jean-sur-Richelieu QC	45°17′53″N 73°15′07″W	Federal (13294)		
Maison Étienne-Guertin	2100, Rue Richelieu; Beloeil QC	45°35′56″N 73°11′23″W	Quebec (5123)		More images
Maison Jean-Baptiste-Lamothe	96, Boulevard Richelieu; Beloeil QC	45°32′52″N 73°12′46″W	Quebec (5644)		
Manoir Rouville-Campbell	125, Chemin des Patriotes Sud; Mont-Saint-Hilaire QC	45°33′36″N 73°12′01″W	Quebec (5488)		More images
Maison natale Ozias-Leduc	284, Chemin Ozias-Leduc; Mont-Saint-Hilaire QC	45°32′43″N 73°11′06″W	Quebec (8314)		More images
Maison natale de Paul-Émile-Borduas	39, Rue Saint-Henri; Mont-Saint-Hilaire QC	45°34′13″N 73°11′39″W	Quebec (9460)		More images
École Sacré-Coeur	265, Rue Saint-Hippolyte; Mont-Saint-Hilaire QC	45°34′09″N 73°11′41″W	Quebec (11272)		
Maison Paul-Émile-Borduas	621, Chemin des Patriotes Sud; Mont-Saint-Hilaire QC	45°34′47″N 73°11′25″W	Quebec (12004)		
Église de Saint-Hilaire	Chemin des Patriotes Nord; Mont-Saint-Hilaire QC	45°34′12″N 73°11′41″W	Quebec (12388)		More images
Maison Sénécal	5425, Boulevard des Prairies; Longueuil QC	45°26′01″N 73°26′27″W	Quebec (4927)		More images
Manoir Rolland	625, Chemin de la Riviere-des-Hurons Ouest; Saint-Mathias-sur-Richelieu QC	45°29′30″N 73°11′18″W	Quebec (5033)		
Maison John-Yule	27, Rue Richelieu; Chambly QC	45°26′53″N 73°16′02″W	Quebec (5128)		
Maison Thomas-Whitehead	2592, Rue Bourgogne; Chambly QC	45°26′32″N 73°15′37″W	Quebec (5151)		More images
Maison Franchère	254, Chemin des Patriotes; Saint-Mathias-sur-Richelieu QC	45°28′21″N 73°16′05″W	Quebec (5469)		
Maison Banlier	5505, Boulevard des Prairies; Longueuil QC	45°26′01″N 73°26′21″W	Quebec (5636)		More images
Monument de Charles-Michel D'Irumberry de Salaberry	Chambly QC	45°26′56″N 73°17′30″W	Quebec (8373)		
Centre administratif et communautaire	56, Rue Martel; Chambly QC	45°27′00″N 73°17′28″W	Quebec (8374)		More images
Mairie de Chambly	1, Place de la Mairie; Chambly QC	45°26′56″N 73°17′30″W	Quebec (8375)		More images
Ancienne caserne de pompiers	1500, Avenue Bourgogne; Chambly QC	45°26′57″N 73°17′33″W	Quebec (9406)		
Fort Chambly National Historic Site of Canada	2 Richelieu Street; Chambly QC	45°26′56″N 73°16′34″W	Federal (10175)		
Église et mur du cimetière de Saint-Mathias	Chemin des Patriotes; Saint-Mathias-sur-Richelieu QC	45°28′26″N 73°16′07″W	Quebec (11171)		More images
St. Stephen's Anglican Church National Historic Site of Canada	2004 Bourgogne Street; Chambly QC	45°26′52″N 73°16′25″W	Federal (12086)		
Église Saint-Stephen	Avenue Bourgogne; Chambly QC	45°26′52″N 73°16′26″W	Quebec (12955)		More images
Maison de Saint-Hubert	1541, Chemin de Chambly; Carignan QC	45°27′50″N 73°20′31″W	Quebec (13882)		
Chambly Canal National Historic Site of Canada	Chambly QC	45°22′47″N 73°15′39″W	Federal (17521)		More images
Maison des Gouverneurs	90, Chemin Saint-Ours; Sorel-Tracy QC	46°01′58″N 73°06′59″W	Quebec (6210)		
Carré Royal	Sorel-Tracy QC	46°02′38″N 73°06′54″W	Quebec (9362)		More images
Îlette-au-Pé	21, Chemin de l'Ile-aux-Fantomes; Sainte-Anne-de-Sorel QC	46°04′31″N 72°58′34″W	Quebec (10411)		
Presbytère Christ Church	79, Rue du Prince; Sorel-Tracy QC	46°02′38″N 73°06′51″W	Quebec (12999)		More images
Governors' Cottage National Historic Site of Canada	90, Chemin des Patriotes; Sorel-Tracy QC	46°02′00″N 73°06′58″W	Federal (13453)		More images
Église de Saint-Pierre	Rue George; Sorel-Tracy QC	46°02′45″N 73°06′28″W	Quebec (14344)		More images
Séminaire de Nicolet	350, Rue d'Youville; Nicolet QC	46°13′43″N 72°37′02″W	Quebec (5041)		More images
Atelier et maison Rodolphe-Duguay	195, Rang Saint-Alexis; Nicolet QC	46°13′17″N 72°37′06″W	Quebec (6384)		More images
Vieux presbytère de Saint-Bruno	15, Rue des Peupliers; Saint-Bruno-de-Montarville QC	45°31′26″N 73°20′08″W	Quebec (5155)		More images
Hangar à grain Jodoin	4681, Rang de la Baronnie; Varennes QC	45°43′12″N 73°22′34″W	Quebec (6864)		Upload Photo
Calvaire de Varennes	2511, Rue Sainte-Anne; Varennes QC	45°41′26″N 73°26′10″W	Quebec (9345)		Upload Photo
Chapelle de procession Sainte-Anne	Rue Sainte-Anne; Varennes QC	45°41′15″N 73°26′27″W	Quebec (12441)		
Maison Joseph-Petit-Dit-Beauchemin	Montee de Picardie; Varennes QC	45°41′25″N 73°25′30″W	Quebec (11043)		Upload Photo
Chapelle de procession Saint-Joachim	Rue Sainte-Anne; Varennes QC	45°40′48″N 73°26′23″W	Quebec (13081)		
Manoir François-Pierre-Boucher	468, Boulevard Marie-Victorin; Longueuil QC	45°36′28″N 73°27′23″W	Quebec (5024)		More images
Maison Bachand-Larivière	554, Boulevard de Mortagne; Longueuil QC	45°35′33″N 73°26′04″W	Quebec (5042)		More images
Maison Chaput	601, Boulevard de Mortagne; Longueuil QC	45°35′43″N 73°25′52″W	Quebec (5044)		More images
Maison d'Alençon	300, Chemin d'Alencon; Longueuil QC	45°33′26″N 73°24′33″W	Quebec (5047)		More images
Louis-Hippolyte Lafontaine House (Boucherville)	314, Boulevard Marie-Victorin; Longueuil QC	45°35′57″N 73°27′27″W	Quebec (5223)		More images
Maison Jean-Baptiste-Gauthier-Dit-Saint-Germain	601, Boulevard Marie-Victorin; Longueuil QC	45°36′54″N 73°27′23″W	Quebec (5250)		More images
Maison Quintal	386, Boulevard Marie-Victorin; Longueuil QC	45°36′12″N 73°27′26″W	Quebec (5276)		More images
Maison La Chaumière	466, Boulevard Marie-Victorin; Longueuil QC	45°36′26″N 73°27′22″W	Quebec (6912)		More images
Vieux-Boucherville	Longueuil QC	45°36′43″N 73°27′22″W	Quebec (6953)		More images
Villa De La Broquerie	414, Boulevard Marie-Victorin; Boucherville QC	45°35′57″N 73°27′30″W	Quebec (12396)		More images
Église de Sainte-Famille	Boulevard Marie-Victorin; Boucherville QC	45°36′44″N 73°27′20″W	Quebec (12405)		
Maison Michel-Dubuc	1540, Boulevard Marie-Victorin; Longueuil QC	45°33′56″N 73°29′20″W	Quebec (5038)		More images
Maison Marie-Rose-Durocher	90, Rue Saint-Charles Est; Longueuil QC	45°32′33″N 73°30′24″W	Quebec (4935)		More images
Vieux-Longueuil	Longueuil QC	45°32′15″N 73°30′40″W	Quebec (5043)		
Maison Lamarre	255, Rue Saint-Charles Est; Longueuil QC	45°32′38″N 73°30′22″W	Quebec (5490)		More images
Co-cathédrale Saint-Antoine-de-Padoue	Rue Saint-Charles Ouest; Longueuil QC	45°32′27″N 73°30′29″W	Quebec (9843)		More images
Fort Longueuil National Historic Site of Canada	Longueuil QC	45°32′26″N 73°30′29″W	Federal (14401)		
Maison Patenaude	214, Rue Bourget; Longueuil QC	45°31′02″N 73°31′07″W	Quebec (5487)		More images
Maison Antoine-Ste-Marie	789, Riverside Drive; Longueuil QC	45°30′47″N 73°31′02″W	Quebec (5127)		More images
Maison Marsil	349, Riverside Drive; Longueuil QC	45°30′16″N 73°31′03″W	Quebec (5158)		More images
Maison André-Mercille	405, Riverside Drive; Longueuil QC	45°30′21″N 73°31′02″W	Quebec (5221)		More images
Boutique Garèle	590, Rue Victoria; Longueuil QC	45°30′02″N 73°30′35″W	Quebec (5954)		More images
Ancienne église anglicane	263, Rue Elm; Longueuil QC	45°30′03″N 73°30′03″W	Quebec (5957)		
Maison Beauvais	1, Rue Simard; Longueuil QC	45°28′43″N 73°30′12″W	Quebec (5955)		More images
Maison Louis-Degneau	1525 Chemin de Chambly; Carignan QC	45°27′52″N 73°20′31″W	Quebec (13881)		
Saint-Joachim Church National Historic Site of Canada	1 Boulevard D'Youville; Chateauguay QC	45°21′38″N 73°44′57″W	Federal (19548), Quebec (14210)		
Canadian Pacific Railway Station	191 Victoria Road; Farnham QC	45°16′54″N 72°58′45″W	Federal (7101)		
Salle anglicane du complexe St. James	410 Rue Principale Est; Farnham QC	45°17′00″N 72°58′31″W	Farnham municipality (13275)		
Federal Building	9 Rue de l'Eglise; Lacolle QC	45°04′56″N 73°22′22″W	Federal (15808)		Upload Photo
Battle of Lacolle National Historic Site of Canada	corner of highway 202 east and 223 north Notre-Dame-du-Mont-Carmel Invalid	45°04′03″N 73°20′37″W	Federal (19509)		
Canadian Pacific Railway Station	15 Charlebois Road; Rigaud QC	45°28′52″N 74°18′02″W	Federal (7099)		
Armoury	2155 Laframboise Boulevard; Saint-Hyacinthe QC	45°37′48″N 72°57′06″W	Federal (13076)		Upload Photo
Federal Building	2020 Girouard Street West; Saint-Hyacinthe QC	45°37′24″N 72°56′58″W	Federal (9519)		Upload Photo
Église de Saint-Jean-Baptiste	Rue Principale; Saint-Jean-Baptiste QC	45°31′11″N 73°07′30″W	Quebec (14761)		
Canadian Pacific Railway Station	75 Foch Road; Saint-Jean-sur-Richelieu QC	45°18′33″N 73°15′17″W	Federal (7103)		
Battle of September 6th, 1775 National Historic Site of Canada	Jacques-Cartier Street South; Saint-Jean-sur-Richelieu QC	45°16′53″N 73°15′24″W	Federal (19608)		Upload Photo
Royal Military College Saint-Jean, Gallisonnière Block / Supply	15 Rue Jacques-Cartier Nord; Saint-Jean-sur-Richelieu QC	45°17′56″N 73°15′05″W	Federal (4682)		
Royal Military College Saint-Jean, Sergeants' Mess	15 Rue Jacques-Cartier Nord; Saint-Jean-sur-Richelieu QC	45°17′58″N 73°15′05″W	Federal (10212)		
Église anglicane All Saints Church	8e Rang; Sainte-Christine QC	45°34′48″N 72°22′40″W	Sainte-Christine municipality (15805)		
Canadian National Railways Station	1450 Sicotte Street; Sainte-Hyacinthe QC	45°37′39″N 72°56′56″W	Federal (4544)		
Église Christ Church	Rue du Prince; Sorel-Tracy QC	46°02′39″N 73°06′51″W	Quebec (11121)		
