= Louis-Hippolyte Lafontaine House (Boucherville) =

Coordinates: 45.59480°N 73.44350°W

Louis-Hippolyte La Fontaine House
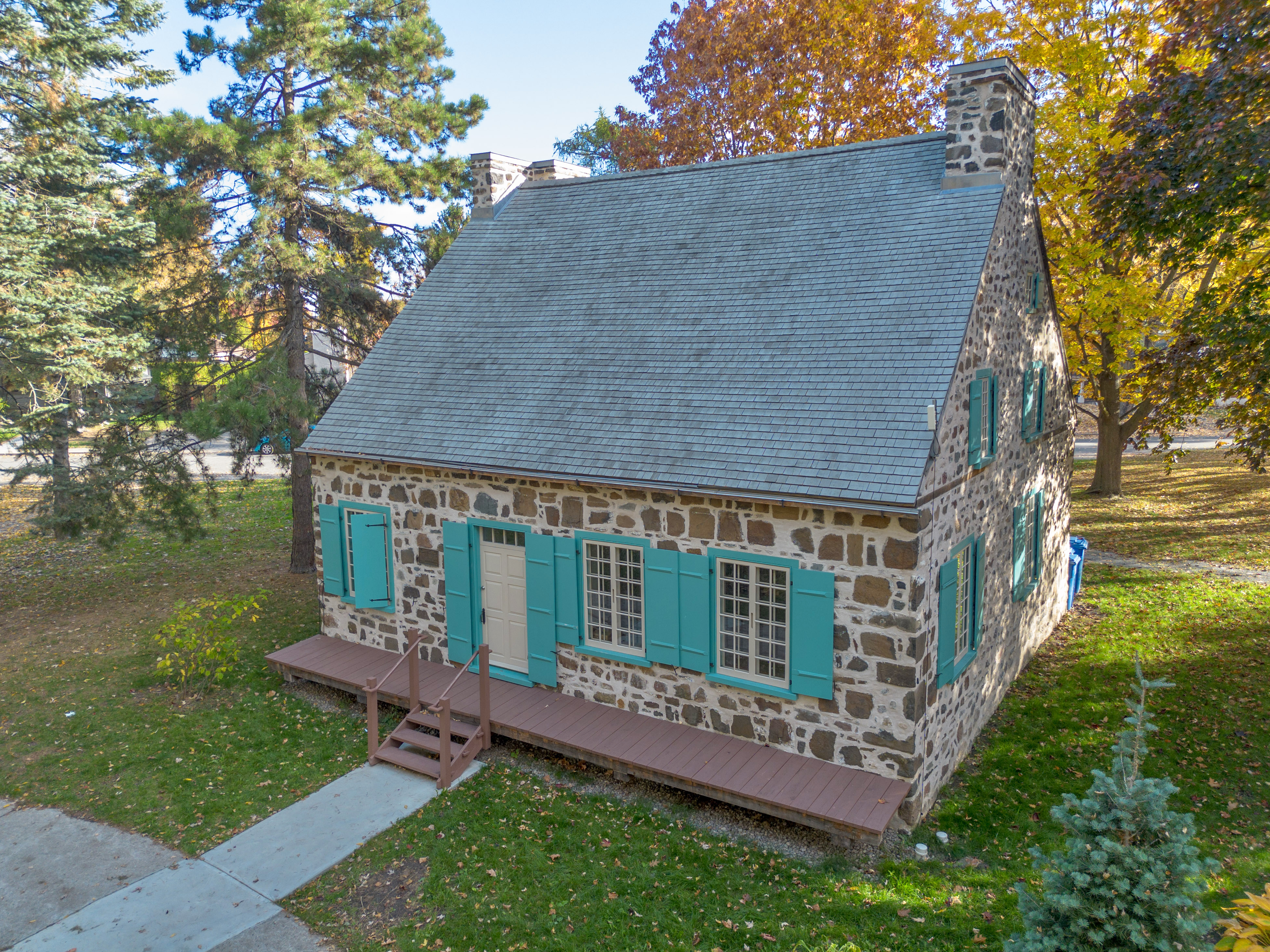
- The house in 2025
- Interactive map of the Louis-Hippolyte La Fontaine House area

General information
- Architectural style: French-Canadian
- Location: 314 Marie-Victorin Boulevard, Boucherville, Quebec
- Year built: 1766
- Relocated: 1964
- Owner: City of Boucherville

The Louis-Hippolyte La Fontaine House is an 18th-century French-Canadian style residence built in 1766, now preserved as a municipal heritage museum in Boucherville, Quebec.

== History ==
Originally constructed in 1766 in the old village of Boucherville at the corner of Notre-Dame and Louis-Hippolyte-La Fontaine streets, the house was moved in one piece to De la Broquerie Historic Park in 1964. It is located today at 314 Marie-Victorin Boulevard.

The building served as the childhood home of Louis-Hippolyte La Fontaine from 1813 to 1820. It was designated a Québec cultural property on 16 March 1965, and a protected area surrounding the house was established in 1976.

Today, the site is operated by the City of Boucherville and features a permanent exhibition on the ground floor.

== See also ==
- List of historic places in Montérégie
