= Île aux Noix =

Island on the Richelieu River in Quebec

Coordinates: 45°07′23″N 73°15′52″W

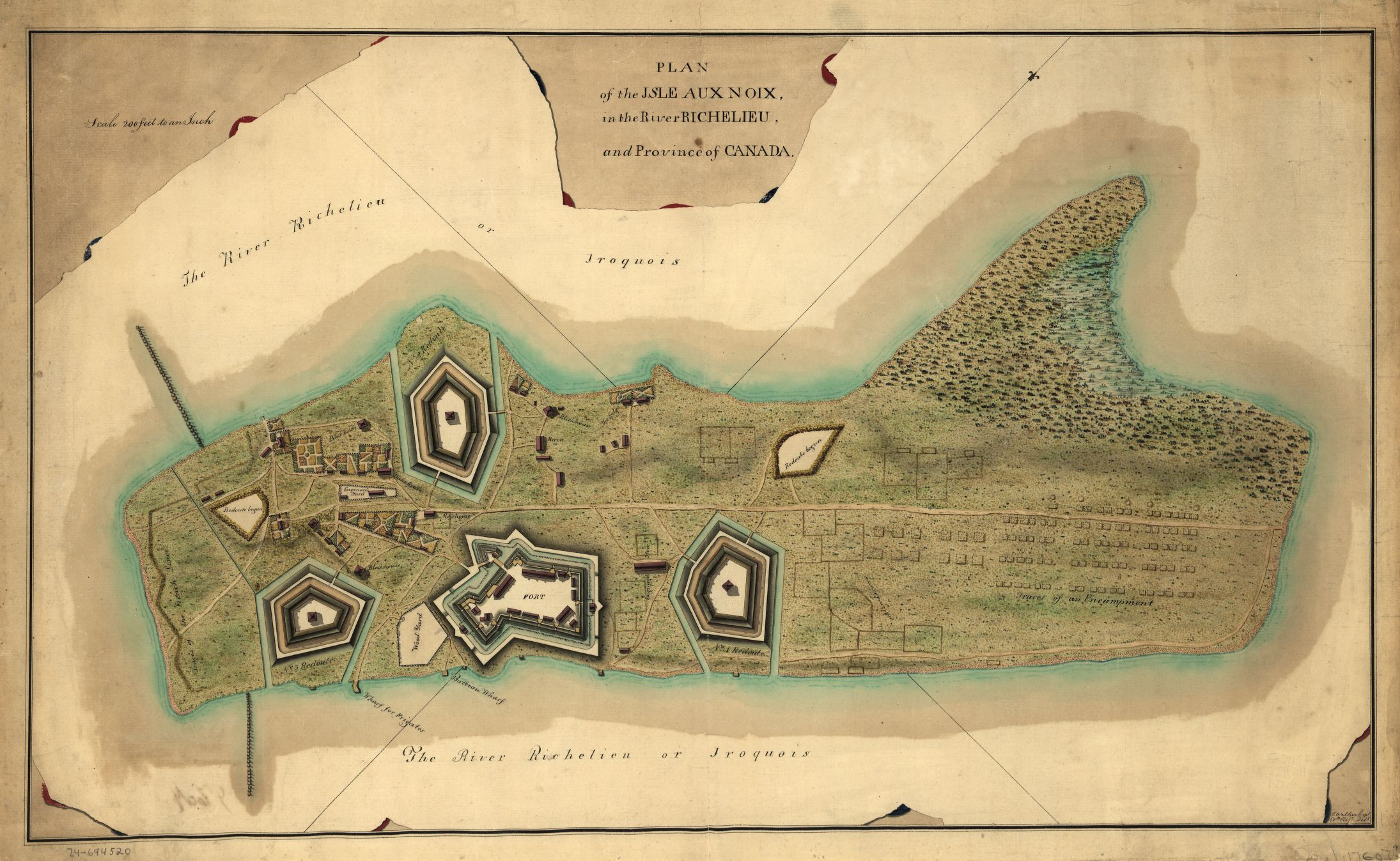
A 1760 map depicting fortifications on the Île aux Noix

Île aux Noix (French pronunciation: [il o nwa]) is an island on the Richelieu River in Quebec, close to Lake Champlain. The island is the site of Fort Lennox National Historic Site of Canada. Politically, it is part of Saint-Paul-de-l'Île-aux-Noix.

== Background ==
Île aux Noix is a 85-hectare (210-acre) island in the Richelieu River. The French and Indian War caused the French to build a fort in 1759, named fort de l'Isle aux Noix, to slow the British advance on Montreal, but were forced to surrender it in 1760. In 1775, the island was taken by American forces, and used as a base by the American generals Philip Schuyler and Richard Montgomery for attacks on Montreal and Quebec. The Americans used the island again in 1776 during their retreat from Canada. Their army spent 10 days on the island: more than 900 American soldiers died from small pox and were buried in two mass graves on Isle aux Noix. The British then built a new fort in 1778 and named it the fort of Isle aux Noix. During the War of 1812, the British used the island to supply their operations against the American fleet on Lake Champlain. The present Fort Lennox was built from 1819 to 1829, when the old fortifications were completely demolished. It remained a military post until 1870 and is now a popular tourist location .

The Île aux Noix Naval Shipyard was a Royal Navy yard from 1812 to 1834 in Quebec and served the RN's Lake Champlain fleet during the War of 1812. HMS Confiance was one of several warships built here.

== French fortifications ==
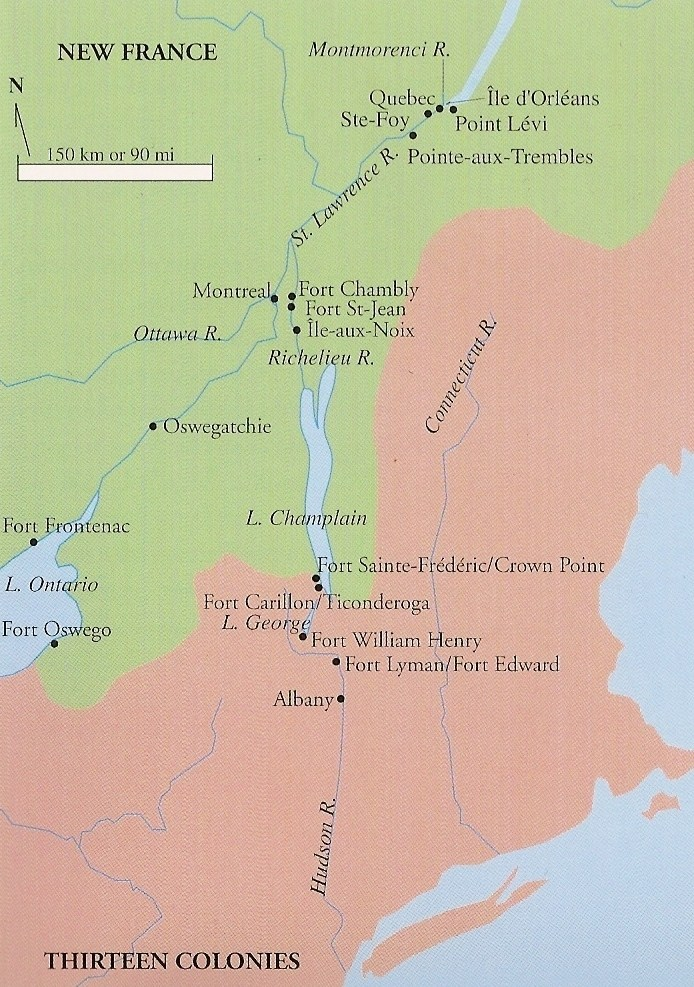
Location of Fort Île aux Noix

The population of New France during the last years of the Seven Years' War lived through difficult times. It faced an appreciable reduction in support from the home country, at a time when France's resources were being stripped by the situation on the European continent. In the colony from year to year, civilians and soldiers saw their hopes crushed as they worked out strategies, which were constantly deprived of the necessary royal support. The campaigns of 1759 and 1760 provide strong evidence of this situation and it is in this context that the strategists decided to build a fort on Île aux Noix.

From August 16 to 28, 1760, French soldiers commanded by Colonel Bougainville, were besieged by William Haviland during the British advance on Montreal. Bougainville realised that the fort of Île aux Noix could not resist a longer siege. On August 27, Bougainville had his troops silently leave the island in the middle of the night and headed to Montreal where he hoped his soldiers could help. The siege of Isle aux Noix ended on August 28, when a group of about forty French soldiers surrendered to the British forces.

The last French governor-general of New France, Pierre François de Rigaud, Marquis de Vaudreuil-Cavagnal, surrendered to British Major General Jeffrey Amherst on September 8, 1760. France finally ceded Canada to the British in the Treaty of Paris, signed on February 10, 1763.

The strategic importance of Île aux Noix decreased as soon as the conquest of Canada was complete in 1760. Amherst had not thought it wise to preserve the French fortifications on Île aux Noix and therefore he ordered the razing of the entrenchments to salvage the construction materials, which might be reused at Crown Point.

== First British fortifications ==
After New France became a British colony, there was not much use for Île aux Noix as a military post. The French fort was destroyed.

Yet after the American invasion of the province of Quebec in 1775-1776 by means of the Richelieu River, the British authorities decided to build a new fort on the island in 1778. It was used during the War of 1812. That fort was demolished to make place for Fort Lennox.

== American occupation ==
In 1775, the island was taken by American forces and used as a base by the American generals Philip Schuyler and Richard Montgomery for attacks on Montreal and Quebec. After being defeated at Quebec and abandoning Montreal, the Continental Army regrouped at the island in 1776 in its retreat from the province of Quebec. The site returned to British hands as an important frontier fort, now its southernmost on the Richelieu. Blockhouses were constructed in 1779 to resist further attack. A much more impressive fortification was built from 1779 to 1782.

== Images ==
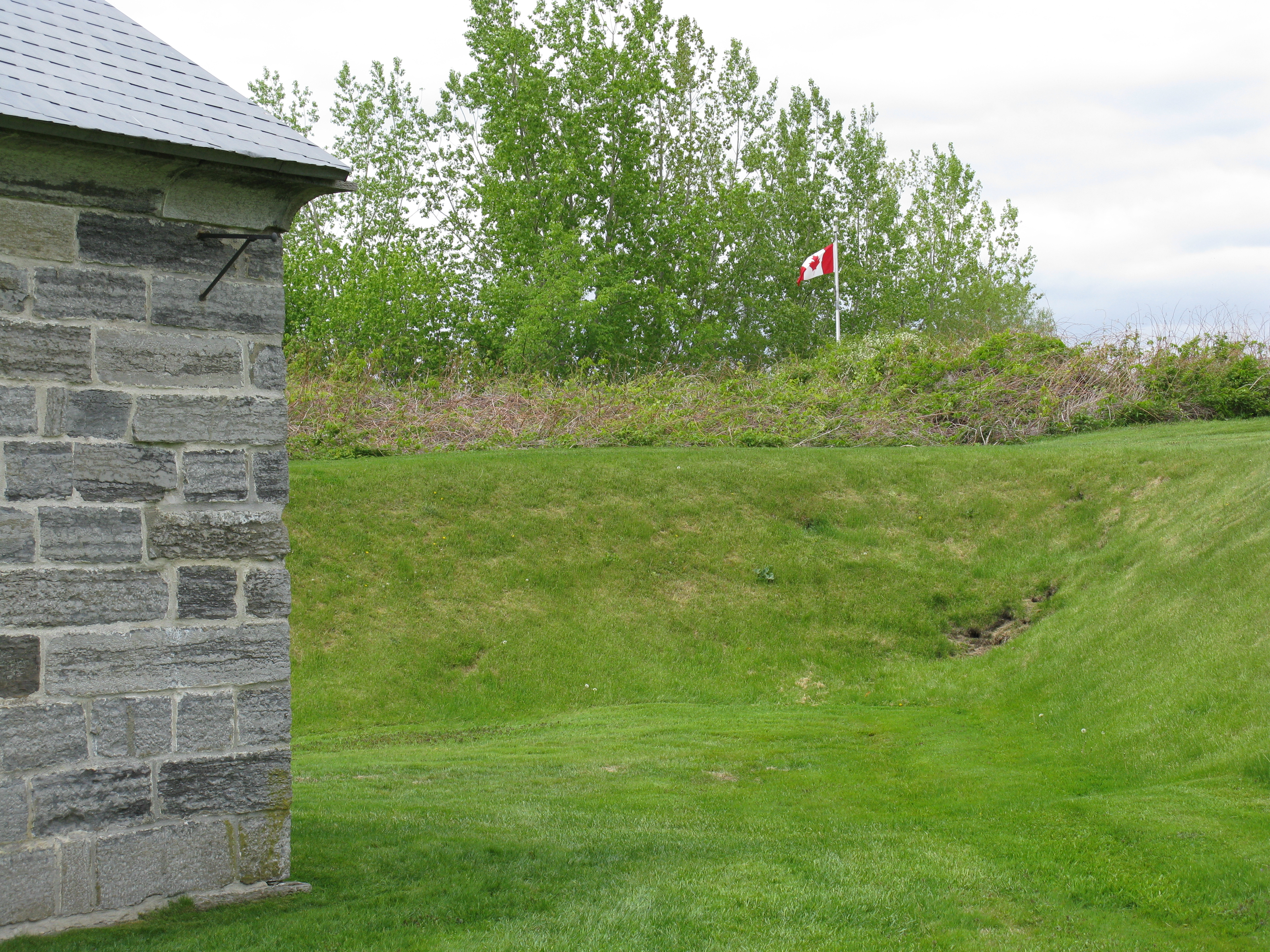
Fort Lennox

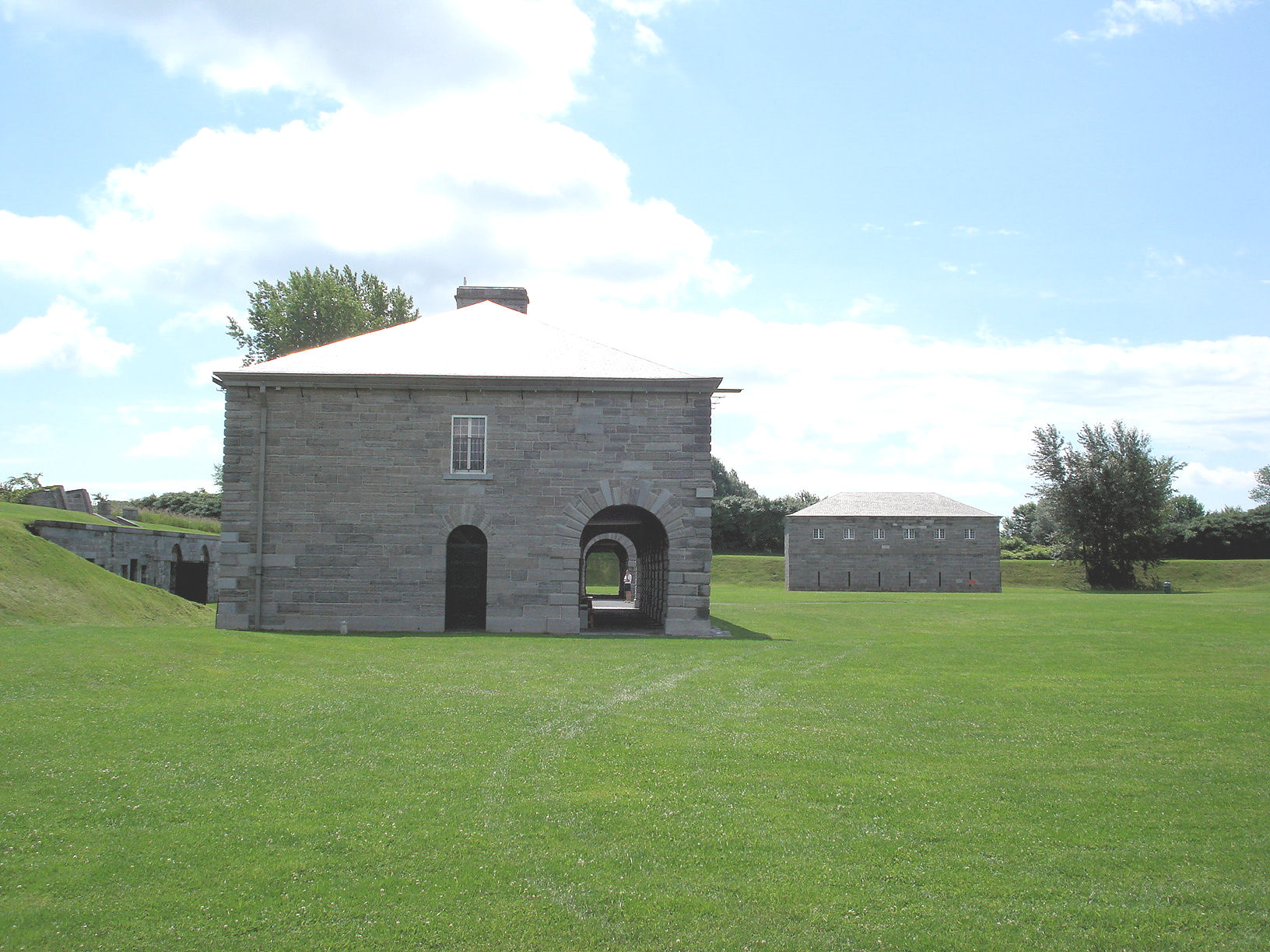
Fort Lennox on île-aux-Noix

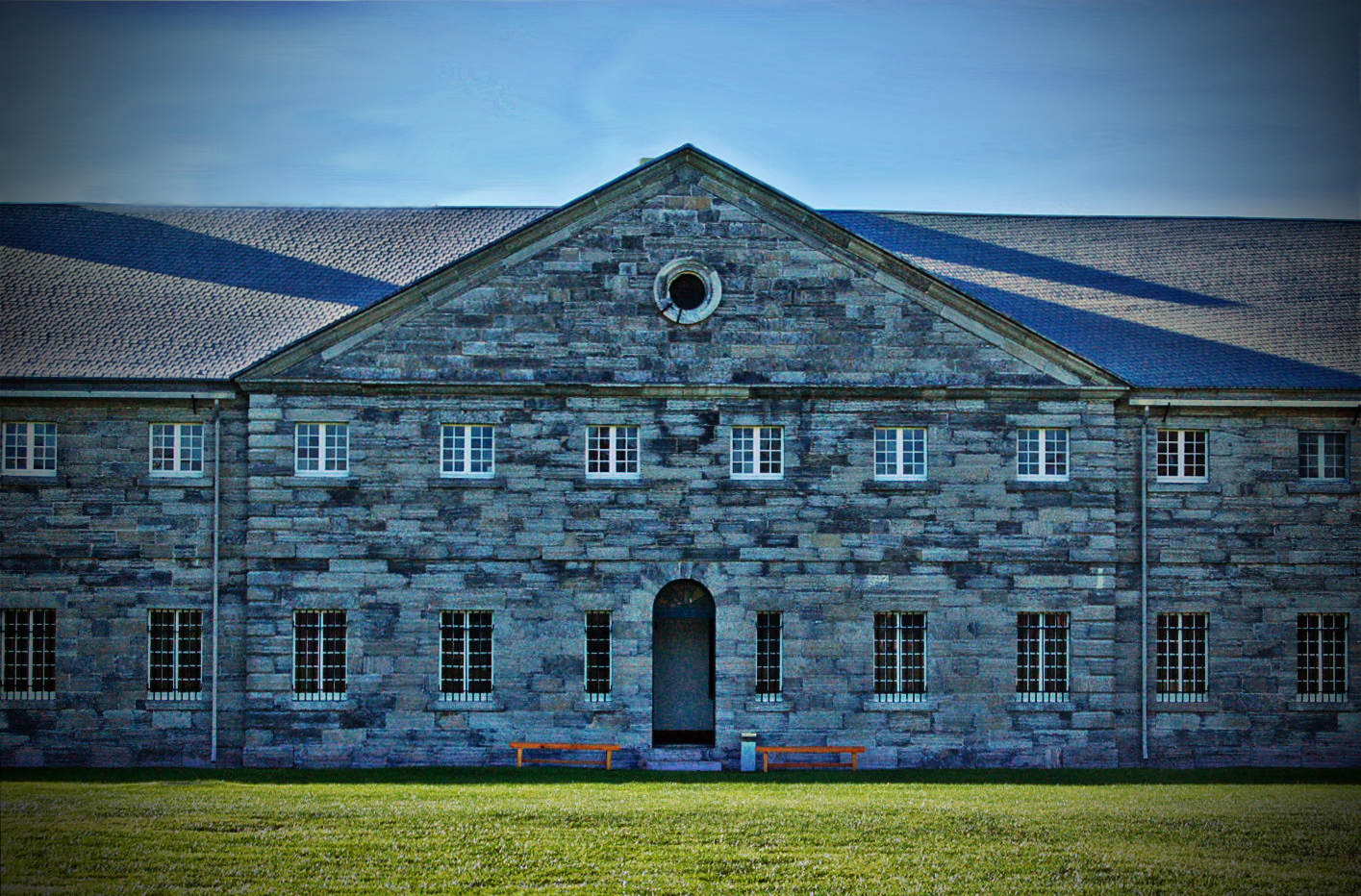
Fort Lennox

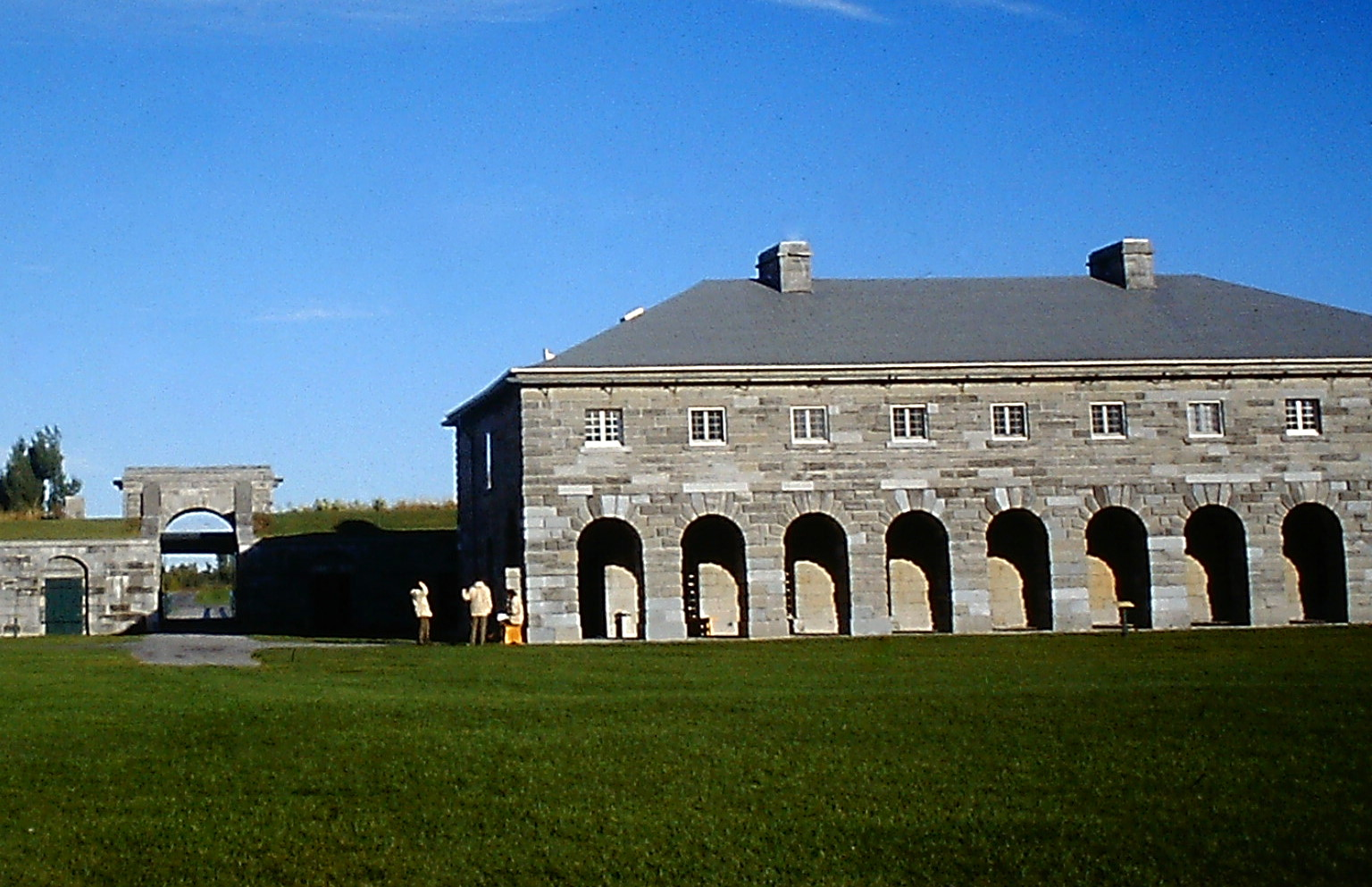
Fort Lennox

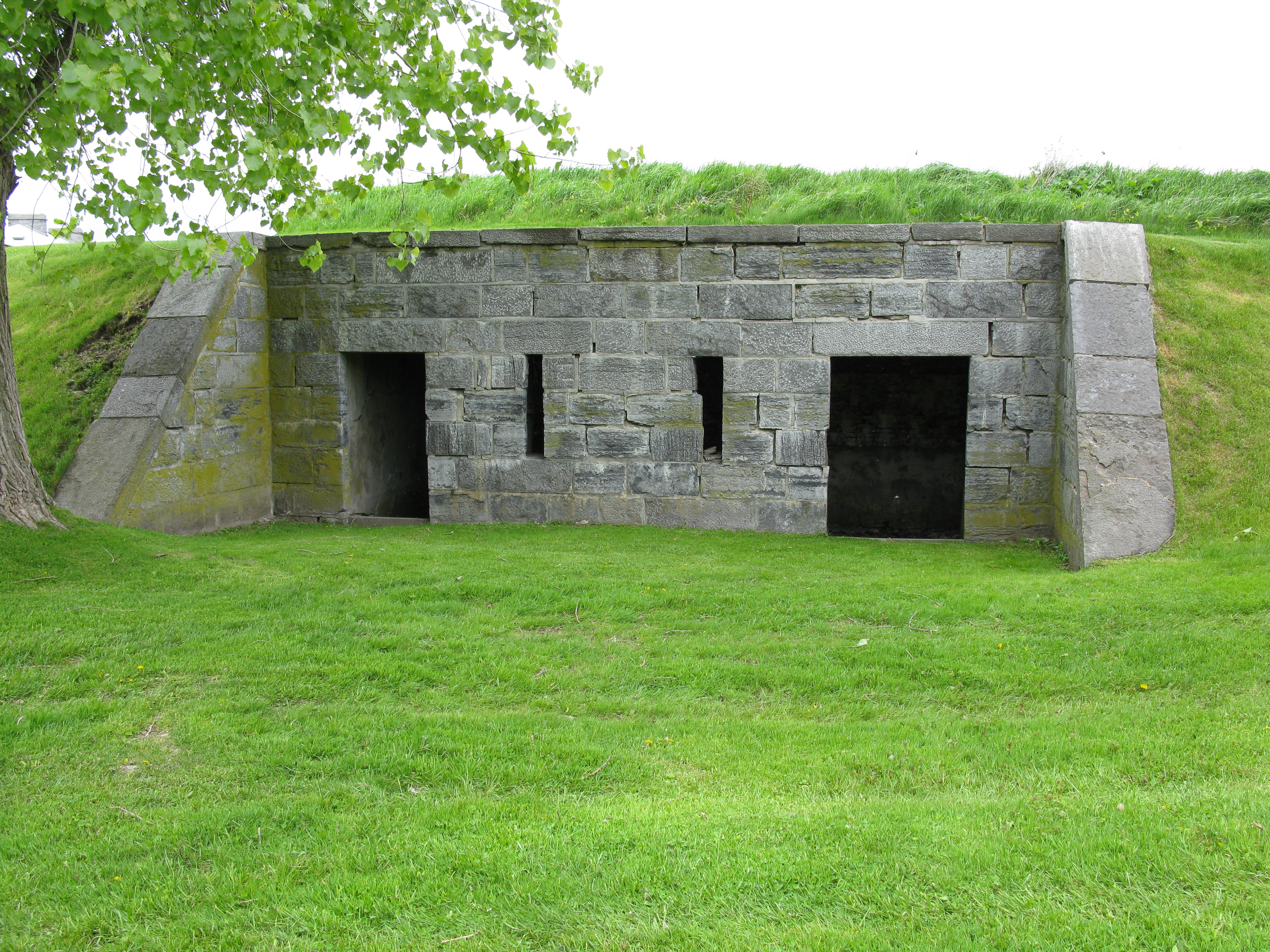
The soldiers' latrines in Fort Lennox.

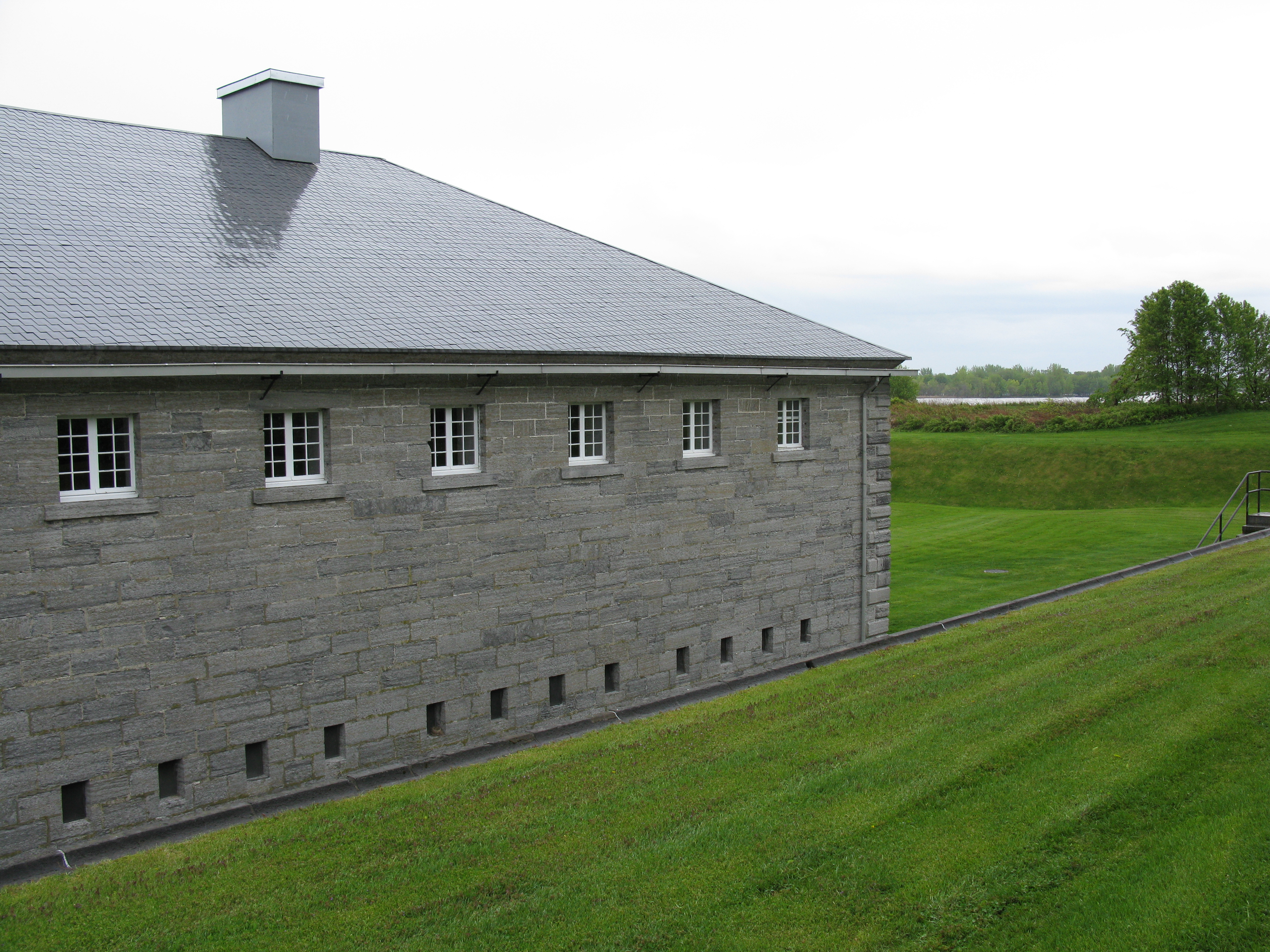
Behind the barracks of Fort Lennox.

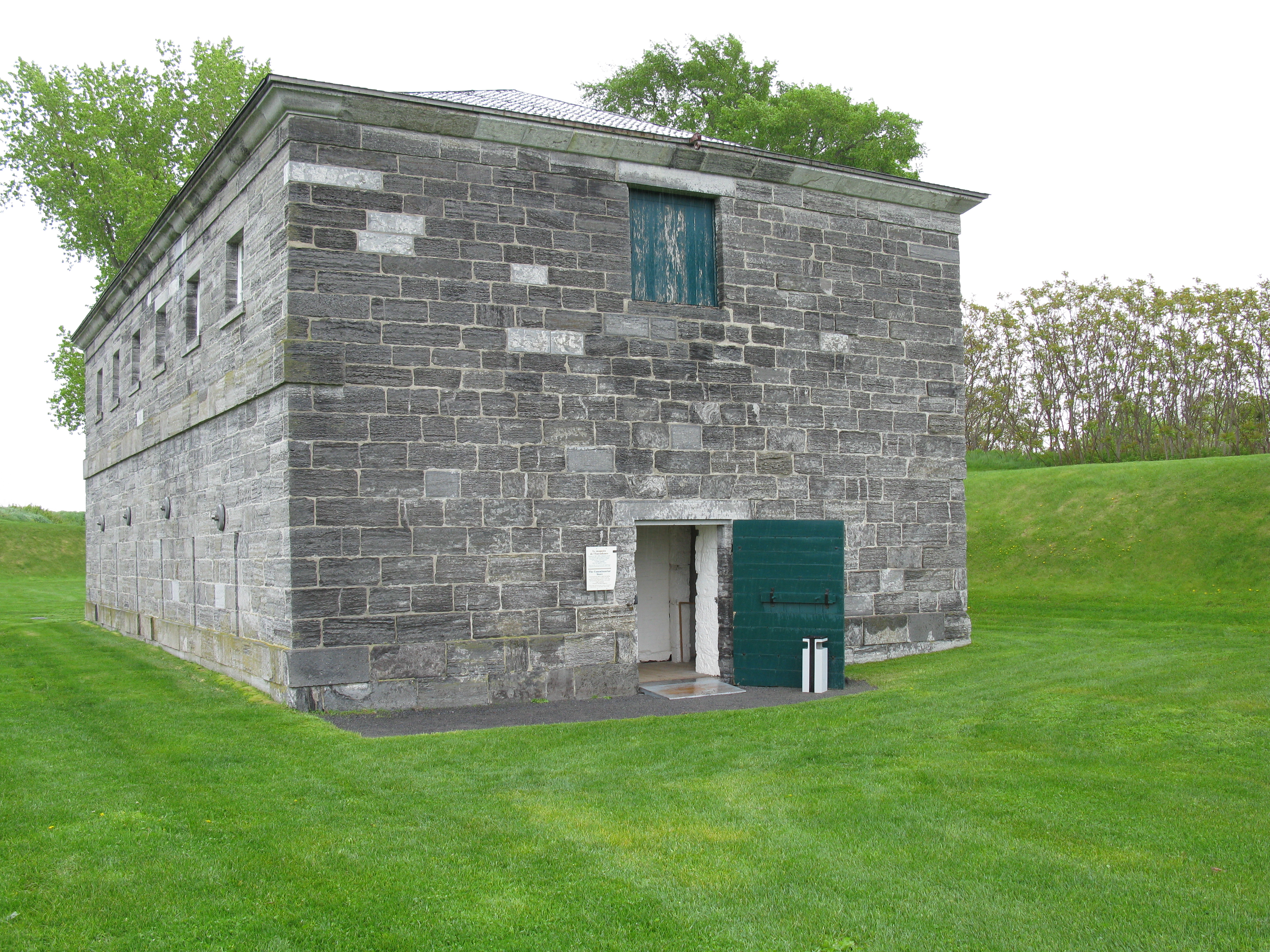
The Commissariat Store of Fort Lennox.

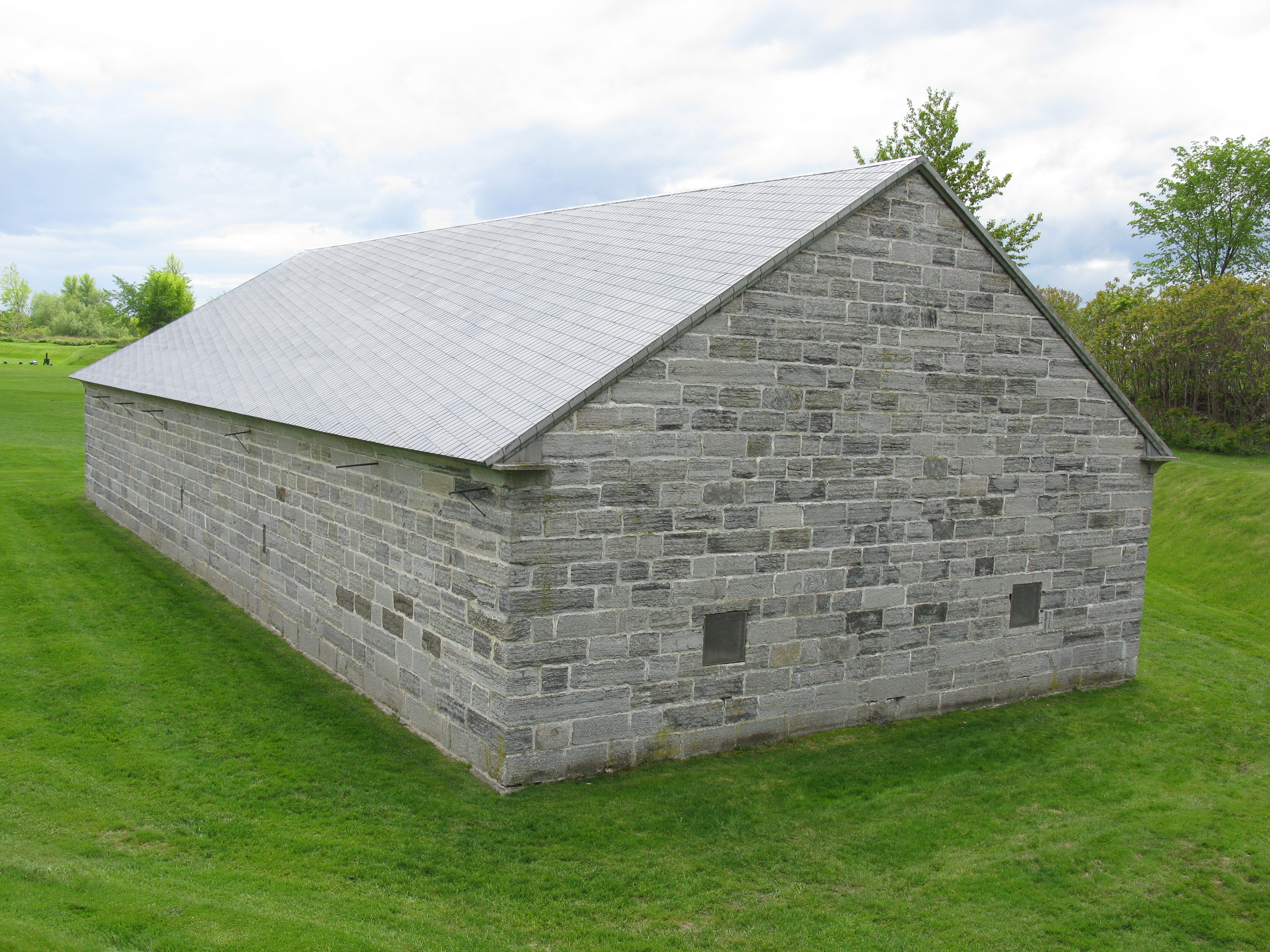
Behind the Powder Magazine at Fort Lennox.

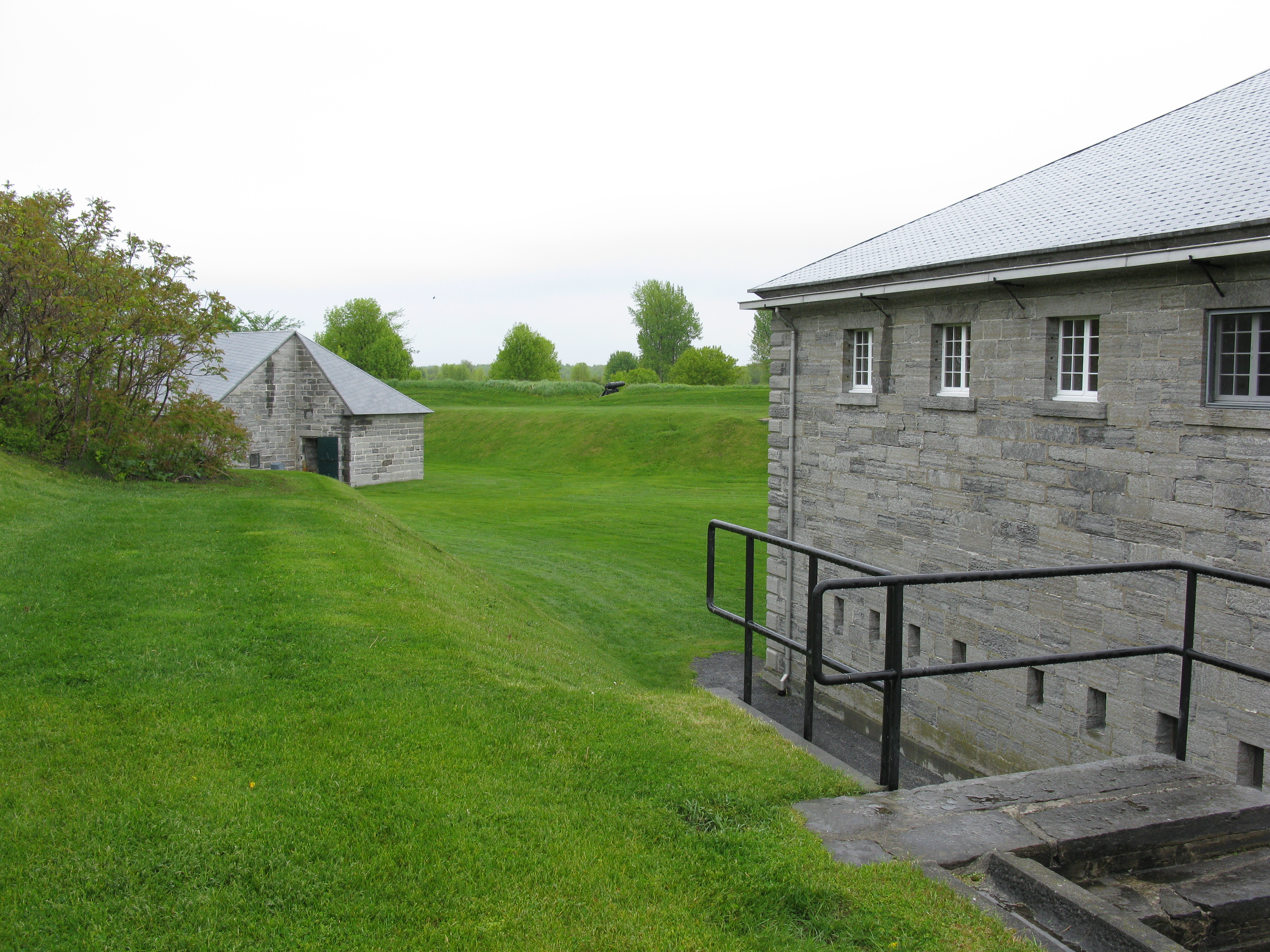
The powder magazine and barracks

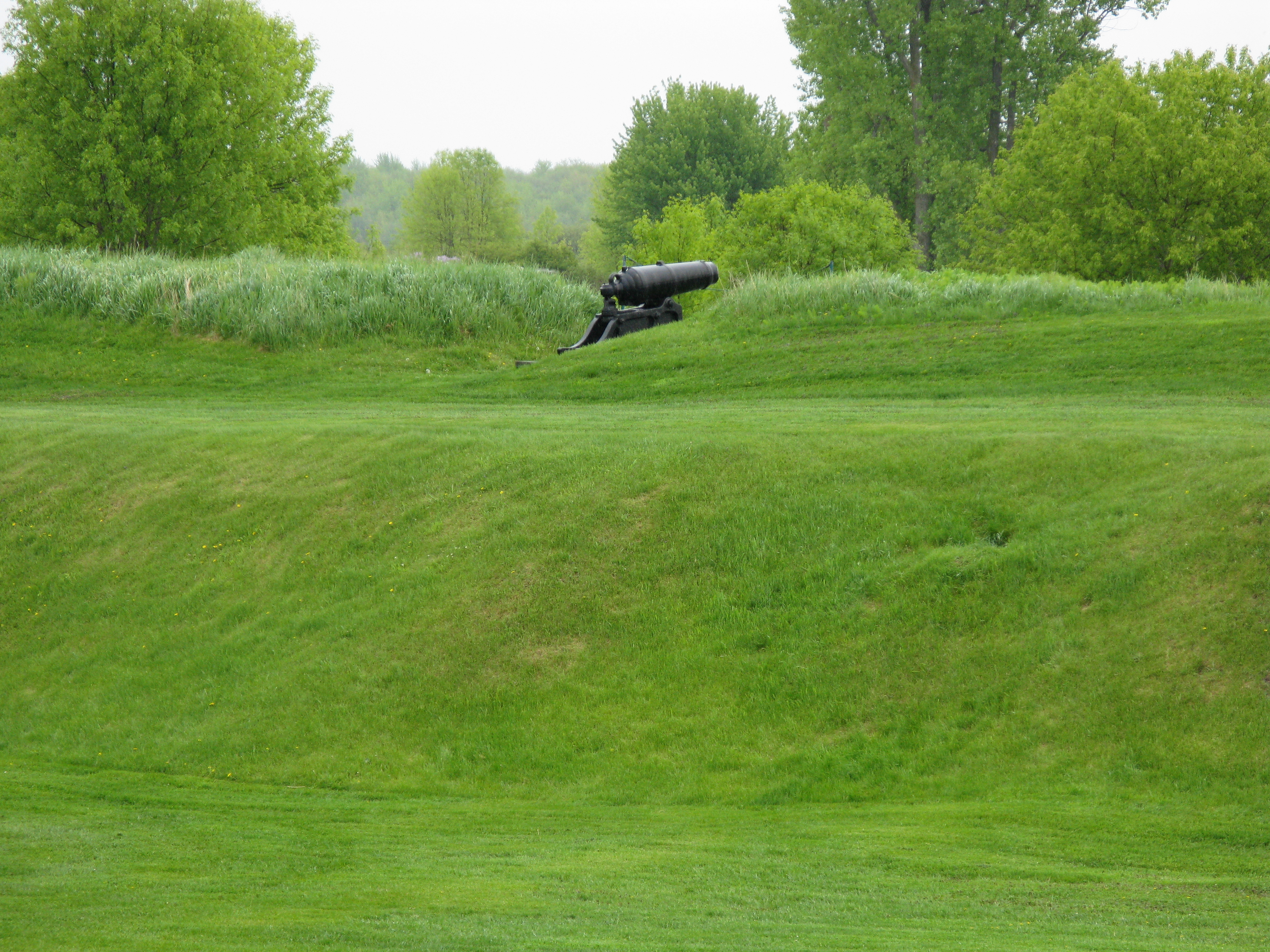
Cannon inside Fort Lennox.

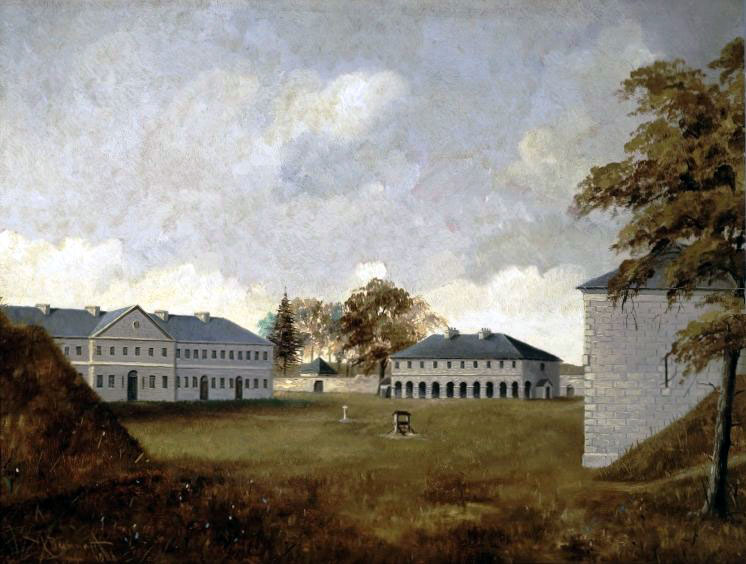
Fort Lennox, Isle-aux-Noix, QC, 1886, Henry Richard S. Bunnett, Oil on canvas.

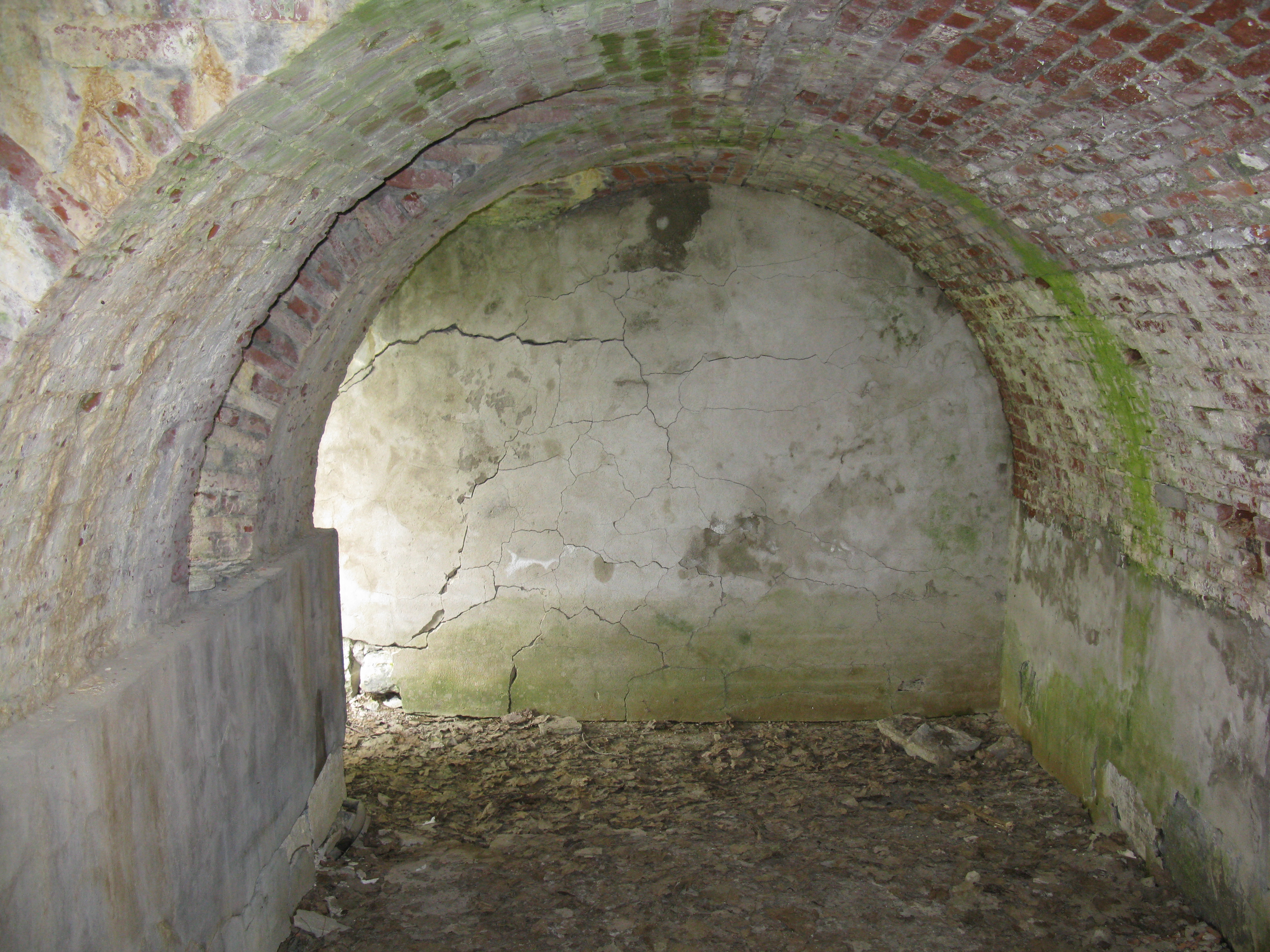
Inside the soldiers' latrines in Fort Lennox.

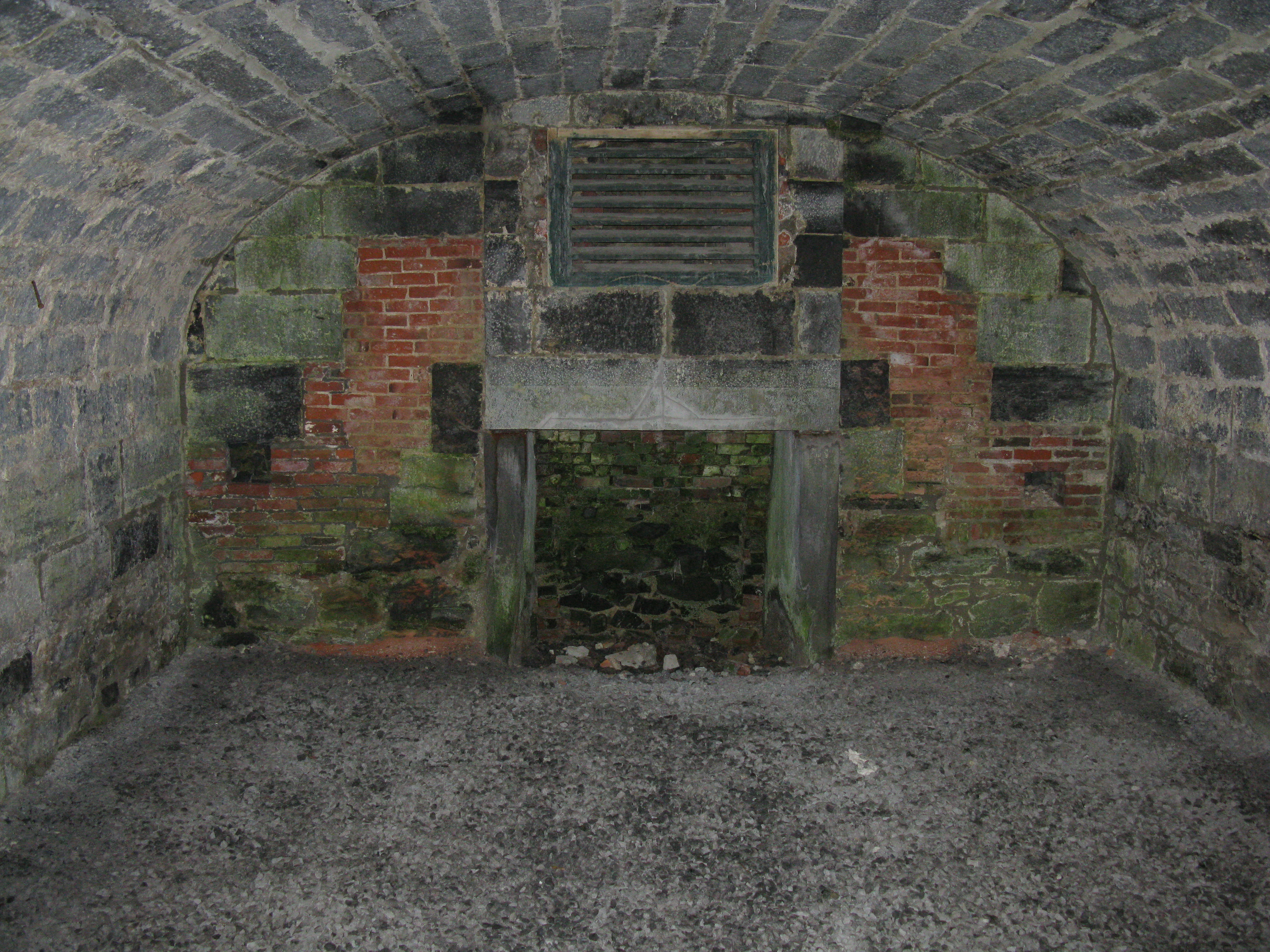
A soldiers' kitchen in Fort Lennox. Located in the casemate behind the barracks.

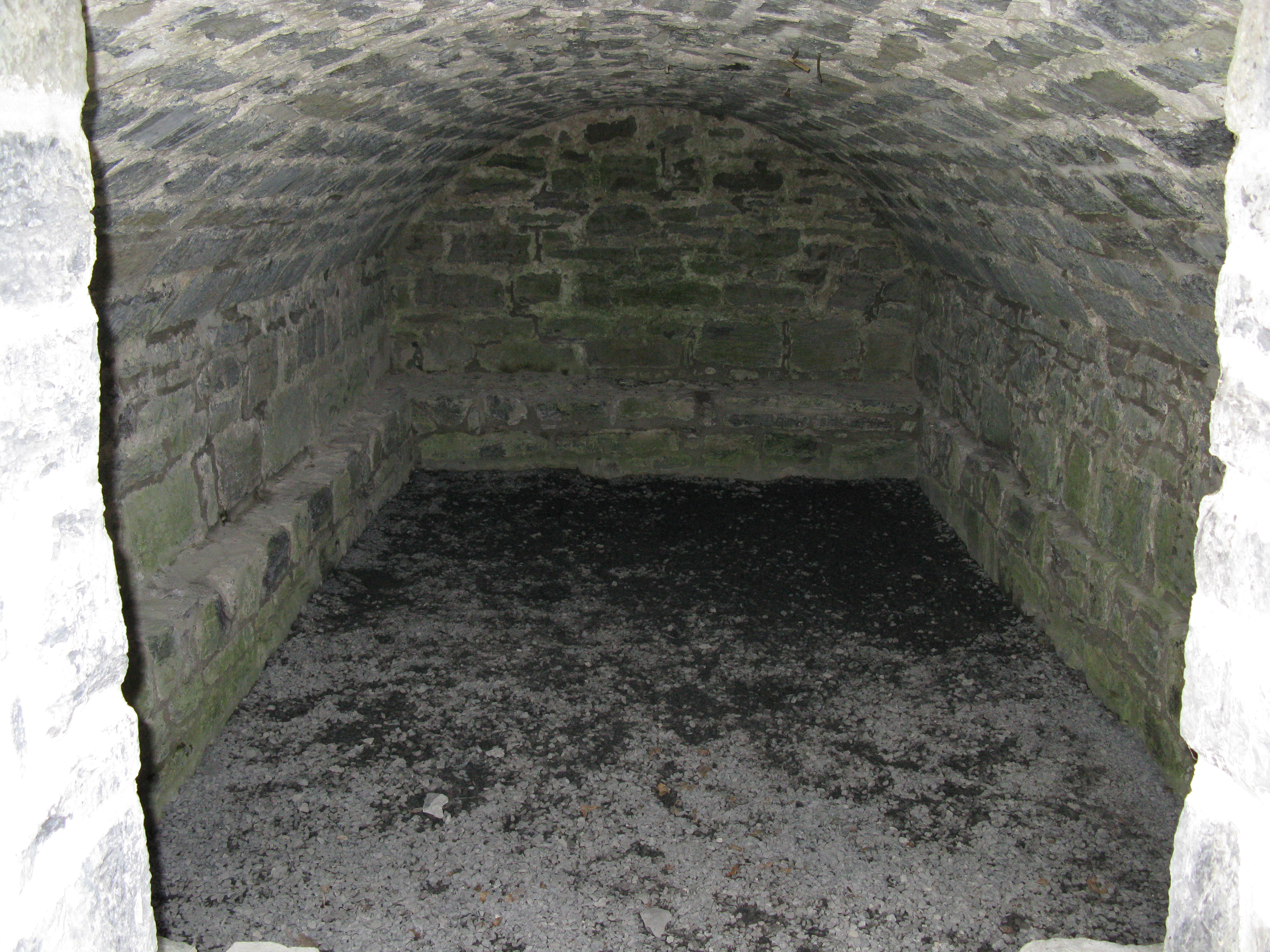
A warehouse located in the casemate behind the barracks of Fort Lennox.

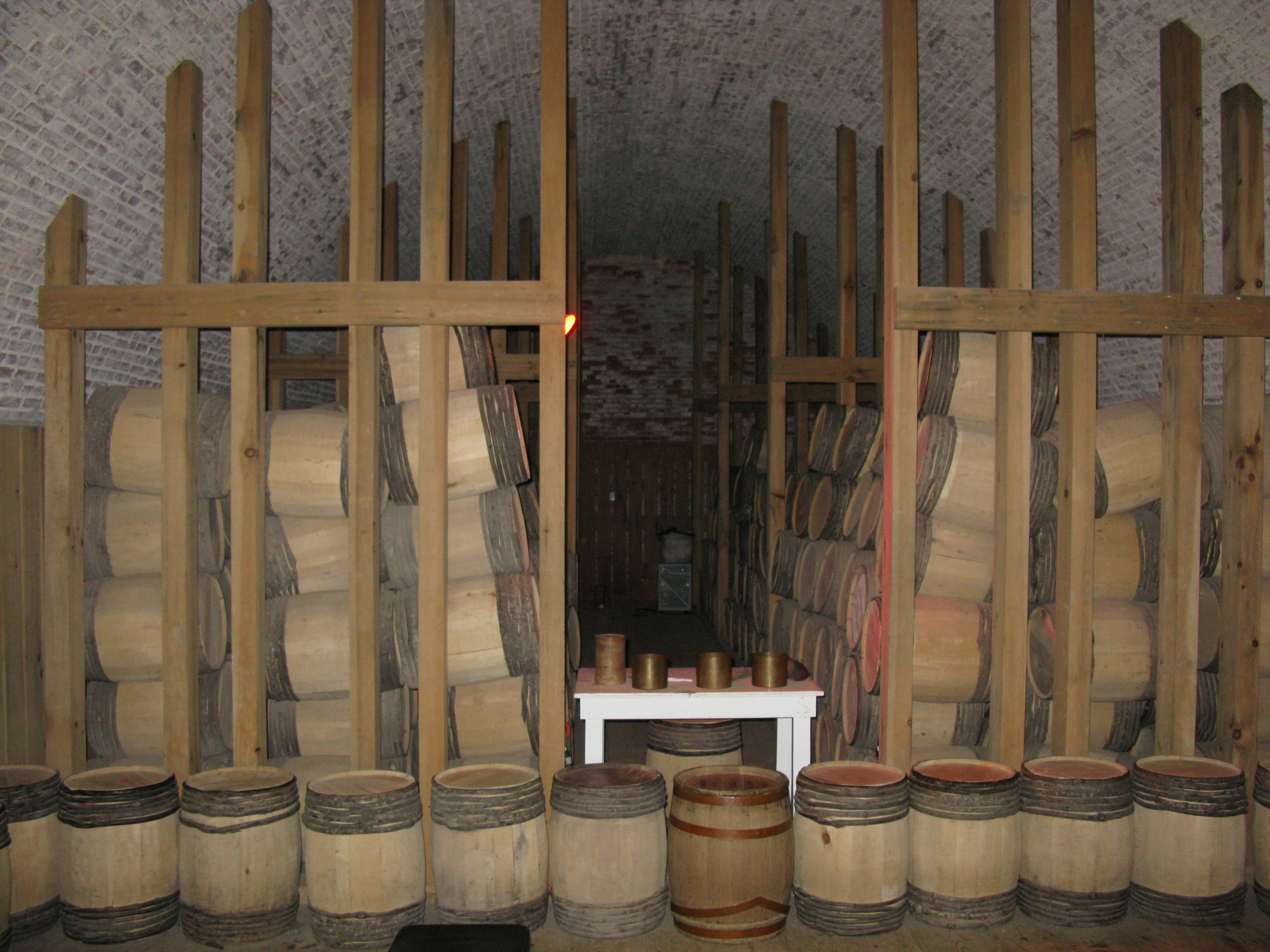
Inside the powder magazine at Fort Lennox.

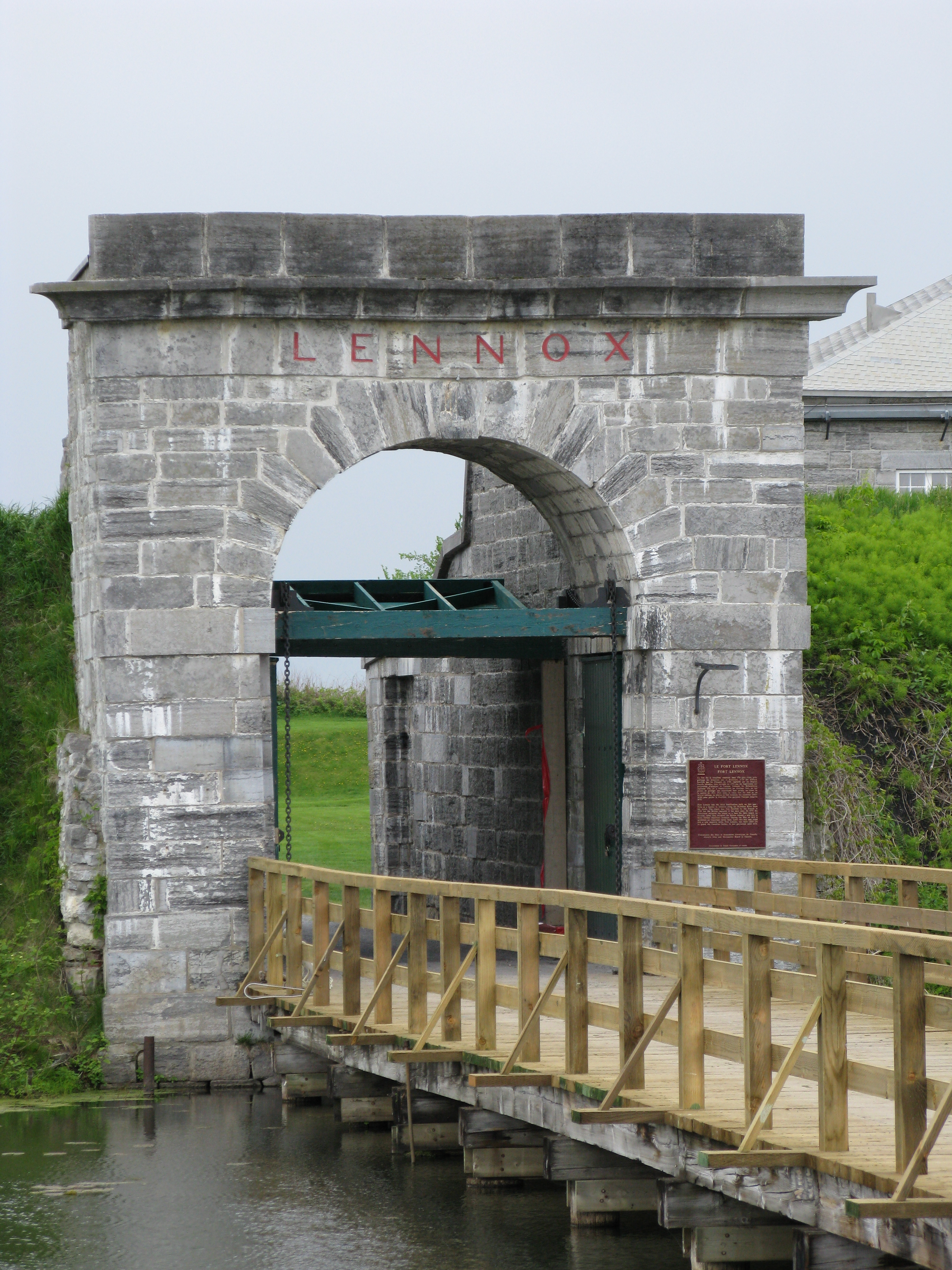
Entrance of Fort Lennox built on Isle-aux-Noix on the Richelieu river.

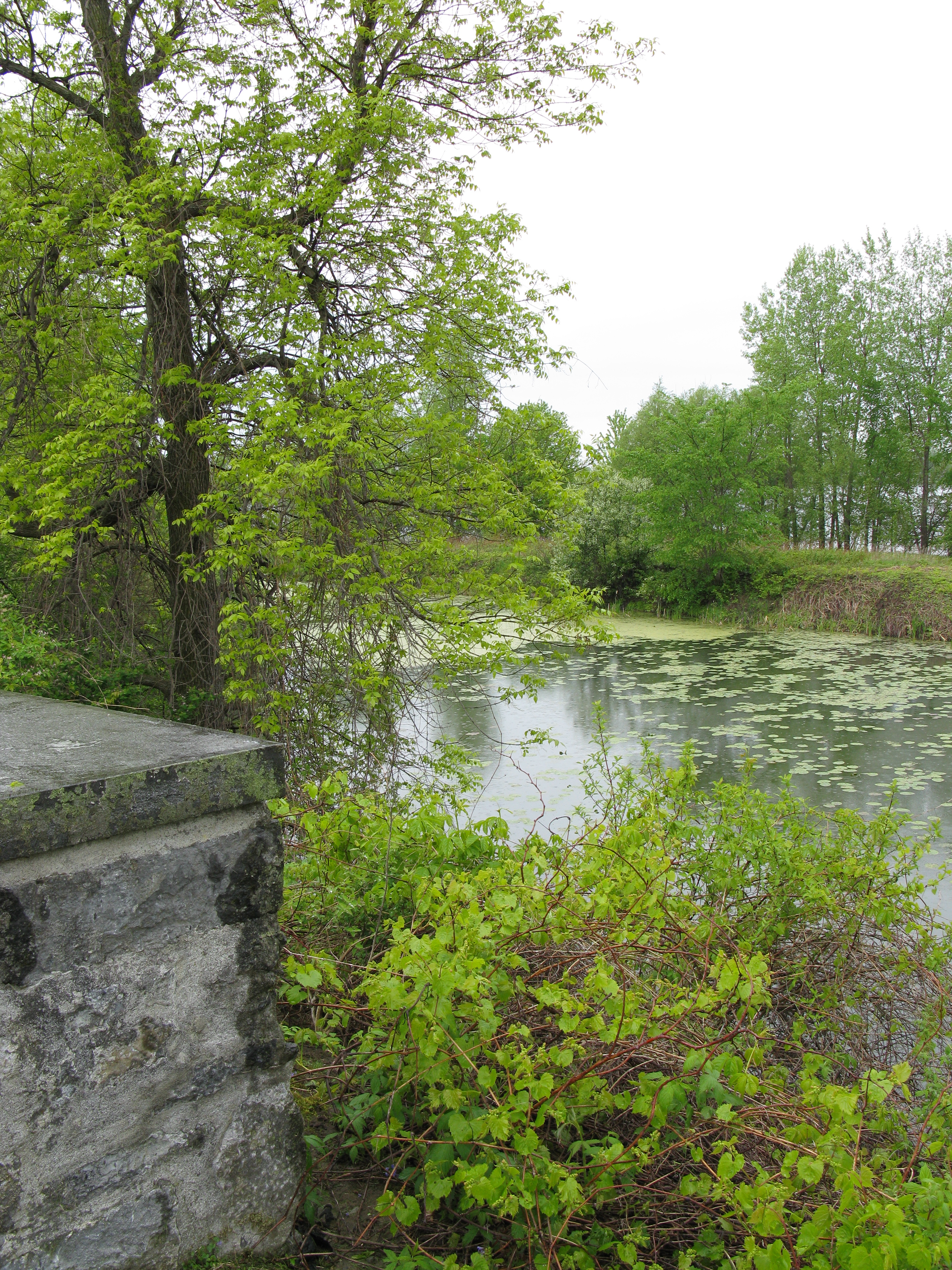
Moat around Fort Lennox. On the left is the top of a chimney above a kitchen located in Fort Lennox.

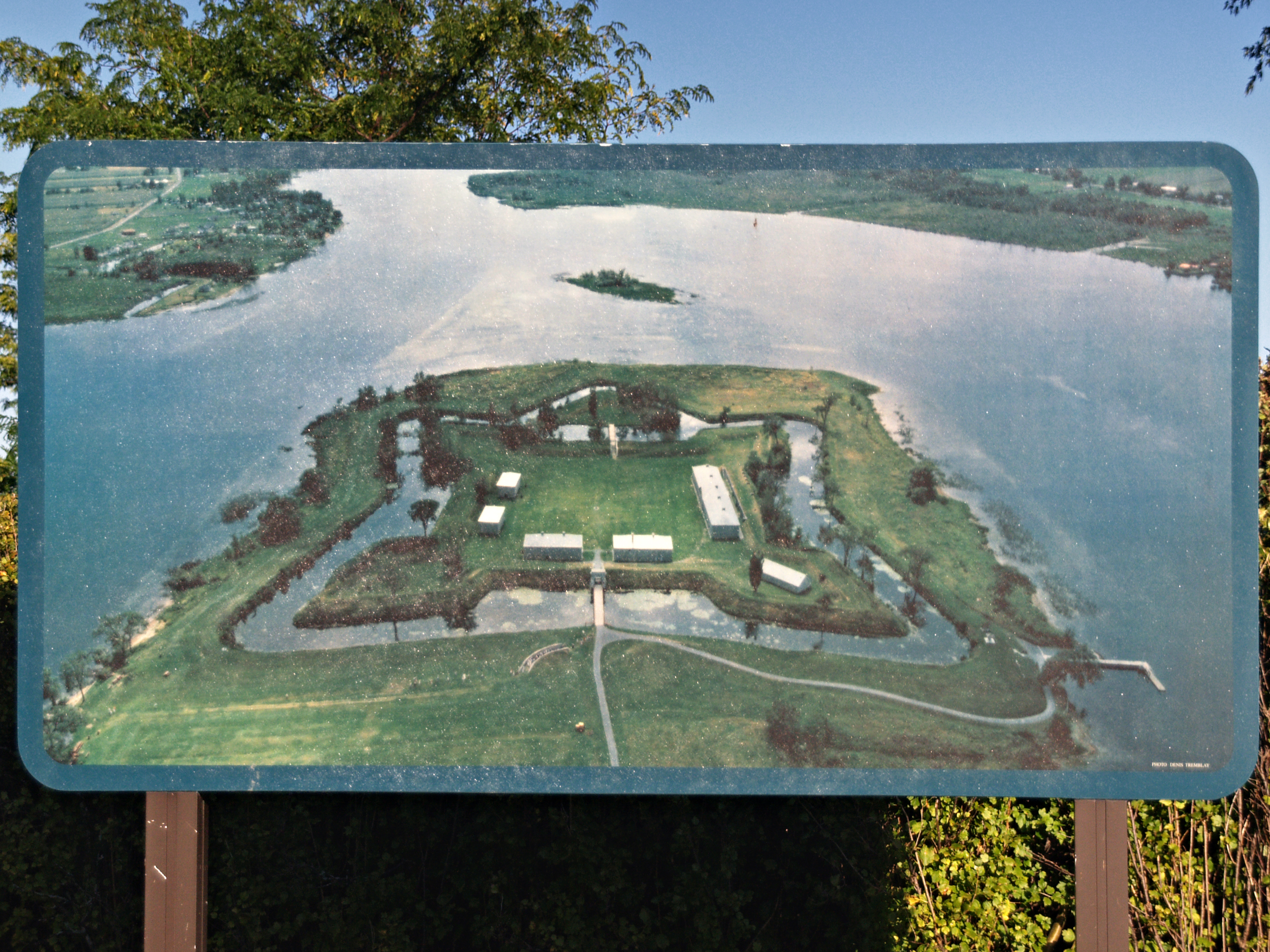
Saint-Paul-de-l'Île-aux-Noix (Québec)

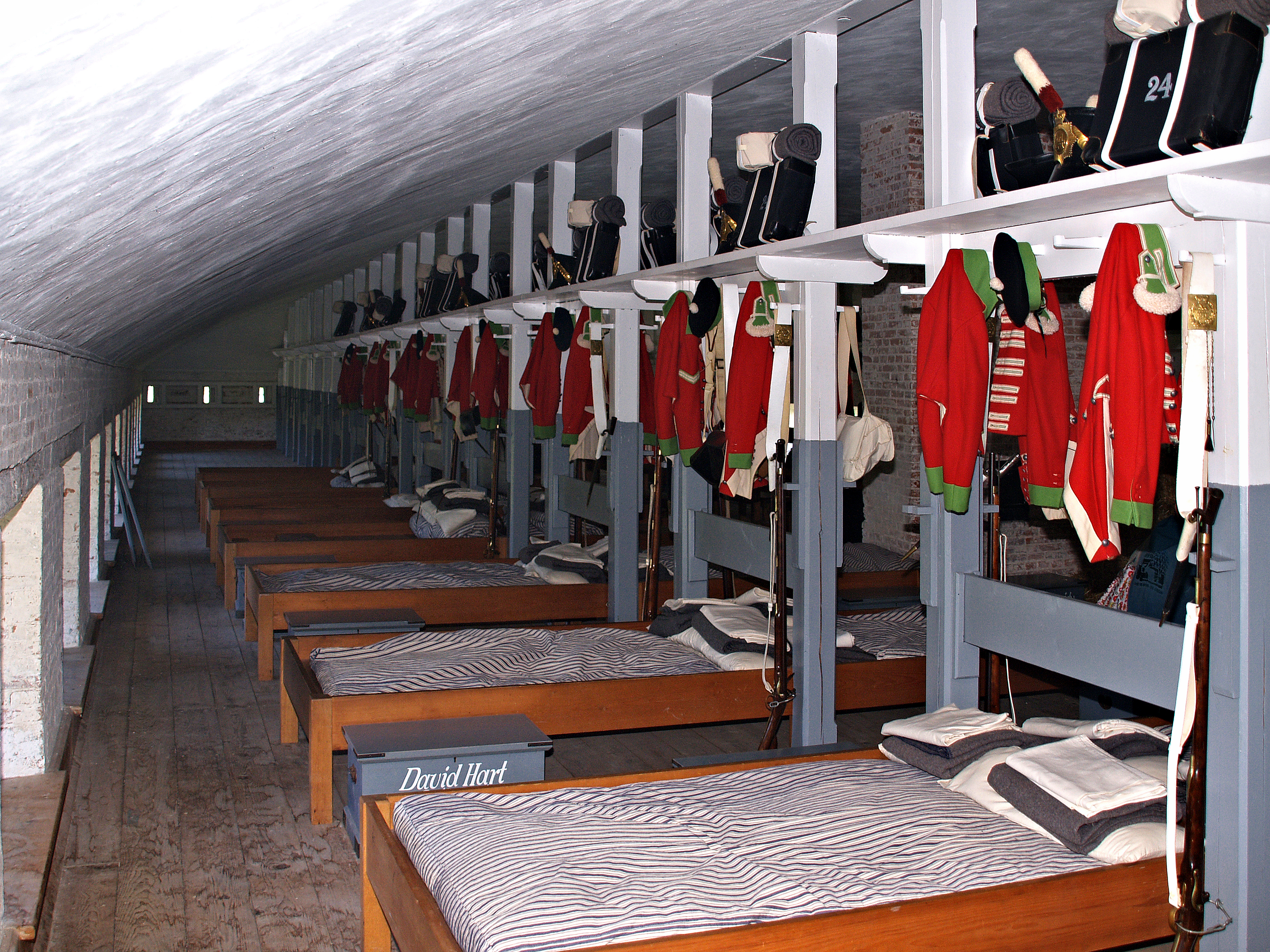
One of the soldiers' barracks of the 24th Regiment at Fort Lennox

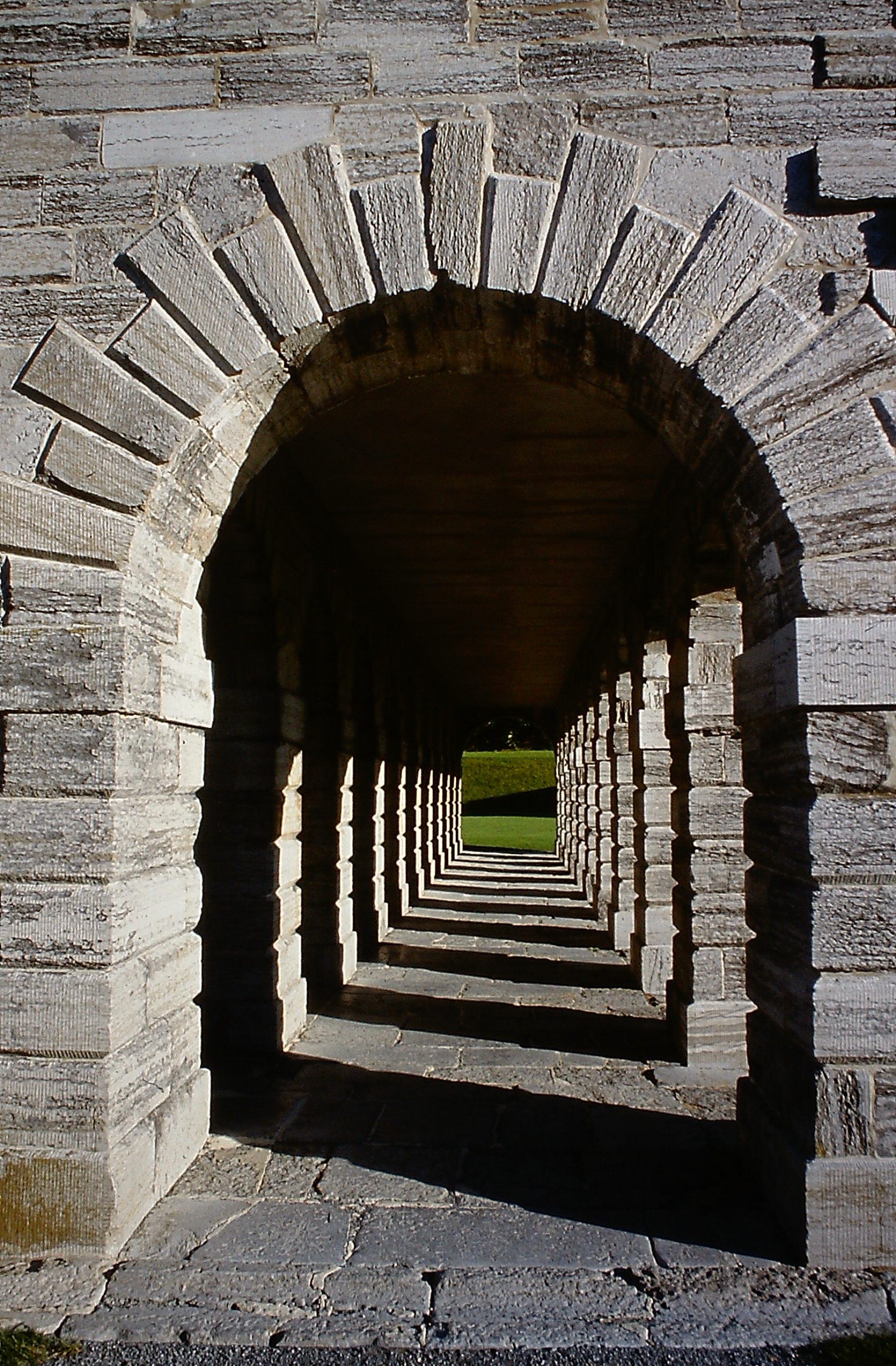
Arcade at Fort Lennox, Province of Quebec

== Second British fortifications ==
During the War of 1812, the race for naval superiority in the area re-established the military importance of the island, which became the main support point for the British navy on this border. The flagship of the British squadron on Lake Champlain, HMS Confiance, a 36 gun 5th rate frigate, became the largest vessel ever constructed at Île aux Noix.

See Battle of Lake Champlain

== Postwar ==
The postwar period provided another opportunity to rethink the defensive system on the Upper Richelieu in the light of the experience acquired in the War of 1812. This time the endless debate between Saint-Jean-sur-Richelieu, Quebec and Île aux Noix brought the engineer officers into direct opposition to the naval officers. The engineers favoured Saint-Jean because of the many possibilities of bypassing Île aux Noix, while the naval officers, convinced by the experiences of the recent war, preferred Île aux Noix because of its advantages against an operation over water. The latter were further favoured by the activities of the Americans a short distance from the border, since the construction of Fort Montgomery provided the competent British authorities with an argument for supporting Île aux Noix.

== Troops ==
- French regulars
- British 1st Regiment of Foot (Royal Scots)

== Internment camp ==
From 1940 the island was the home of an internment camp which held European Jewish refugees who had been forcibly removed from Britain. The camp was initially called Camp I, later Camp No. 41. Internees were treated as enemy aliens, and only after a year did the Canadian authorities begin to treat them as refugees. They were still not free to leave the camp, however, in some cases until 1944.
